= Francesco Antonio Depace =

1xth-century Roman Catholic bishop

Most Reverend Francesco Antonio Depace
- Bishop of Aquino
- Church: Catholic Church
- Diocese: Diocese of Aquino
- In office: 1646–1655
- Predecessor: Angelo Maldachini
- Successor: Marcello Filonardi

Orders
- Consecration: 8 Dec 1646 by Pier Luigi Carafa (seniore)

Personal details
- Born: 1586 Polignano, Italy
- Died: 1655 (aged 68–69)

Francesco Antonio Depace (1586–1655) was a Roman Catholic prelate who served as Bishop of Aquino (1646–1655).

== Biography ==
Francesco Antonio Depace was born in 1586 in Polignano, Italy. On 3 Dec 1646, he was appointed during the papacy of Pope Innocent X as Bishop of Aquino. On 8 Dec 1646, he was consecrated bishop by Pier Luigi Carafa (seniore), Cardinal-Priest of Santi Silvestro e Martino ai Monti, with Ranuccio Scotti Douglas, Bishop of Borgo San Donnino, and Alessandro Vittrici, Bishop of Alatri, serving as co-consecrators. He served as Bishop of Aquino until his death in 1655.

== External links and additional sources ==
- Cheney, David M. "Diocese of Aquino e Pontecorvo". Catholic-Hierarchy.org. (for Chronology of Bishops) ^{[self-published]}
- Chow, Gabriel. "Diocese of Aquino (Italy)". GCatholic.org. (for Chronology of Bishops) ^{[self-published]}

Catholic Church titles
Preceded by Angelo Maldachini	Bishop of Aquino; 1646–1655	Succeeded by Marcello Filonardi
