= Instrument of the Primum Mobile =

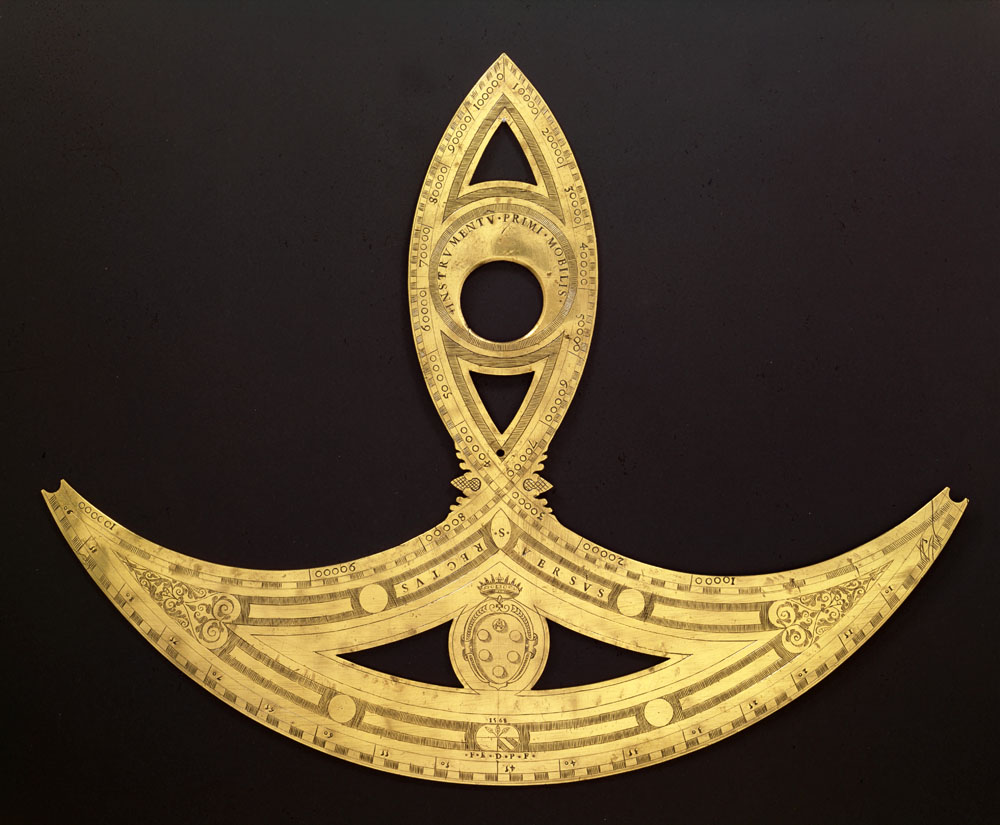
Instrument of the Primum Mobile. Medici collections, Museo Galileo

The Instrument of the Primum Mobile is also called the quadrant of Petrus Apianus, because he invented it and described it in the treatise Instrumentum primi mobilis (Nuremberg, 1524). The instrument is used to find sines and cosines. It bears the initials "F.E.D.P.F." [Frater Egnatius Dantis Predicatorum Fecit]. Ignazio Danti dedicated it to Cosimo I de' Medici, as attested by the Medici coat of arms engraved on the front. The instrument was depicted on the ceiling of the Stanzino delle Matematiche in the Uffizi Gallery.

== Bibliography ==
- Mara Miniati, ed. (1991). Museo di storia della scienza: catalogo. Firenze: Giunti. p. 44, board n. 28. ISBN 88-09-20036-5.
