= Giacomo Simonetta =

Italian bishop and cardinal

Giacomo Simonetta (1475 – 2 November 1539) was an Italian Roman Catholic bishop and cardinal.

== Biography ==
Giacomo was born in Milan, the son of Giovanni and his second wife Catarina Barbavara, daughter of Marcolino Barbavara.

He studied law in Milan. In 1494, he became a member of the Collegio degli Avvocat in Milan. He became a consistorial advocate in 1505. He became an auditor of the Roman Rota in 1511 and served as the dean of the Roman Rota from 1522 to 1528. He also participated in the Fifth Council of the Lateran from 1512 to 1517.

On 17 July 1528, he was elected bishop of Pesaro. He was consecrated as a bishop on 14 September 1529 in the chapel of San Lorenzo in Piscibus by Cardinal Agostino Spinola. While Paolo Capizucchi was absent from Rome, Pope Clement VII name Bishop Simonetta to replace him in the matter of the divorce of Henry VIII of England.

Pope Paul III created him a cardinal priest in the consistory of 21 May 1535. He received the red hat and the titular church of San Ciriaco alle Terme Diocleziane on 31 May 1535.

On 20 December 1535, he was named bishop of Perugia. He and six other cardinals were named on 8 April 1536 to a congregation for celebrating an ecumenical council. He was named bishop of Lodi on 4 August 1536, though he later resigned the government of the diocese in favor of his nephew Giovanni Simonetta on 20 June 1537. He opted for the titular church of Sant'Apollinare alle Terme Neroniane-Alessandrine on 28 November 1537.

On 10 December 1537, he resigned the administration of Pesaro in favor of his nephew Ludovico Simonetta, who later became a cardinal himself.

A short time later, he became prefect of the Apostolic Signatura. On 7 January 1538, he and eight other cardinals were named to a second congregation charged with preparing for an ecumenical council. On 6 February 1538, he was appointed to the diocese of Nepi-Sutri. He resigned the government of Perugia on 20 July 1538.

He mediated a dispute between the Republic of Florence and the Republic of Siena for control over Montepulciano and was able to broker a mutually agreeable solution. In 1539, he was the papal legate to the Council of Vincenza, along with Cardinals Girolamo Aleandro land Bonifacio Ferrero. On 10 January 1539, he became Camerlengo of the Sacred College of Cardinals.

He died in Rome on 1 November 1539. He is buried in Trinità dei Monti.
