= San Ciriaco alle Terme Diocleziane =

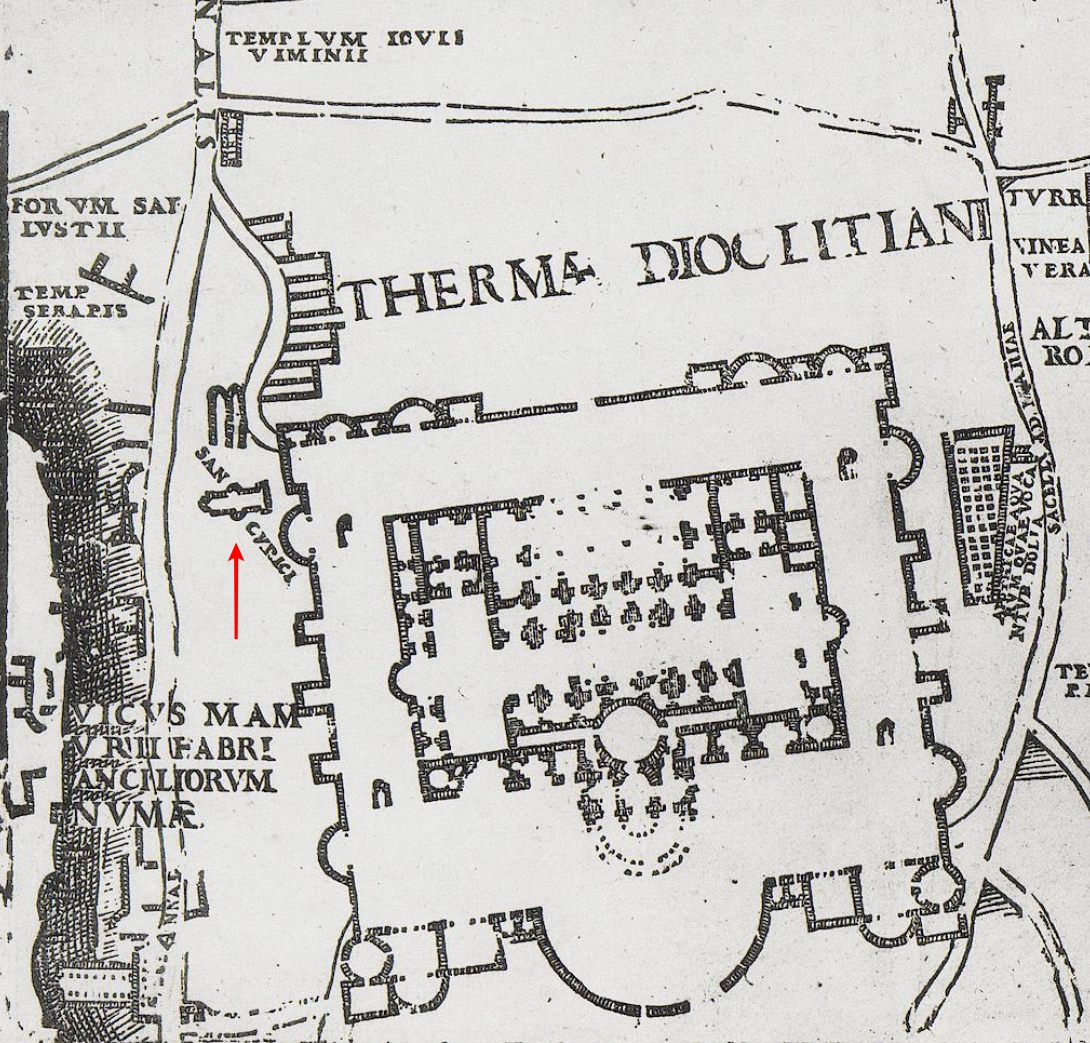
San Ciriaco alle Terme Diocleziane’s blueprint

San Ciriaco alle Terme Diocleziane was a church in the Baths of Diocletian in Rome. It was made a titulus by the Roman synod of 1 March 499.

According to a list written by Pietro Mallio during the pontificate of pope Alexander III, it was linked to the basilica church of Santa Maria Maggiore and its priests celebrated mass alternately at the two churches. In the 12th century it was known as San Ciriaco in thermis and, under pope John XXII, as San Ciriaco in Verminis. The titulus was suppressed by Pope Sixtus V, who replaced it with that of Santi Quirico e Giulitta. This may have been partly due to the reputation of the baths including rumours of murder there.

== List of holders ==
- Marcianus (494-?)
- Aventinus (590-?)
- Constantinus (731 – start of 745)
- Procopius (745- start of 765)
- Saxolus (761-?)
- Leo (?) (853?-?)
- Leo (867-?)
- Marinus (939 or 941–942)
- Giovanni (circa 1067-?)
- Crisostomo (1099- circa 1105)
- Domnizzone (or Domnizo) (1105 – start of 1117)
- Crisogono (circa 1117 – circa 1122)
- Oderisio, O.S.B. (1122–1126)
- Rustico (1128- start of 1142)
- Niccolò (1143–1152)
- Lombardo (1171-1179)
- Giovanni Domenico Trinci (1213?–1219?)
- Riccardo, O.S.B. (1252–1262)
- Etienne de Suisy (1305–1311)
- Guillaume Teste (1312–1326)
- Bernard d'Albi (1338–1349)
- Niccolò Caracciolo Moschino, O.P. (1378–1389)
- Giovanni Piacentini (1385–1404), pseudocardinal of Antipope Clement VII
- Cristoforo Maroni (1389–1404)
- Matthew of Kraków (or Ciaconiani) (1408–1410)
- Johann von Bucka (1426–1430)
- Vacante (1430–1439)
- Dénes Szécsi (1440–1465)
- Thomas Bourchier (1467–1486)
- Bernardino Lunati (or da Lunate) (1493–1497)
- Pietro Isvalies (or Isuales, or Isuali, or Isuagles, or Suaglio) (1500–1511)
- Vacant (1511–1517)
- Scaramuccia Trivulzio (1517–1527)
- Agostino Spinola (1527–1534)
- Francesco Cornaro (1534–1535)
- Giacomo Simonetta (1535–1537)
- Girolamo Aleander (or Aleandro) della Mota (1538)
- Pietro Bembo, O.S.Io.Hier. (1539–1542)
- Pomponio Cecci (1542)
- Gregorio Cortese, O.S.B. (1542–1548)
- Bernardino Maffei (1549–1553)
- Giovanni Andrea Mercurio (1553–1560)
- Ludovico Simonetta (1561–1566)
- Giovanni Francesco Commendone (1566–1574)
- Vacant (1574–1580)
- Pedro de Deza (1580–1584)
- Alessandro Ottaviano de' Medici (1584–1587)
