= Luca Antonio Gigli =

Most Reverend Luca Antonio Gigli
- Bishop of Alatri
- Church: Catholic Church
- Diocese: Diocese of Alatri
- In office: 1597–1620
- Predecessor: Bonaventura Furlani
- Successor: Francesco Campanari
- Previous post: Titular Bishop of Paphus (1597)

Personal details
- Died: 1620 Alatri, Italy

Luca Antonio Gigli and Luca Antonio Lilius (died 1620) was a Roman Catholic prelate who served as Bishop of Alatri (1597–1620) and Titular Bishop of Paphus (1597).

== Biography ==
On 17 November 1597, Luca Antonio Gigli was appointed during the papacy of Pope Clement VIII as Coadjutor Bishop of Alatri and Titular Bishop of Paphus. He succeeded to the bishopric on December 1597. He served as Bishop of Alatri until his death in 1620.

== External links and additional sources ==
- Cheney, David M. "Diocese of Alatri". Catholic-Hierarchy.org. (for Chronology of Bishops) ^{[self-published]}
- Chow, Gabriel. "Diocese of Alatri (Italy)". GCatholic.org. (for Chronology of Bishops) ^{[self-published]}

Catholic Church titles
Preceded by Aloysius Cornelio	Titular Bishop of Paphus; 1597	Succeeded by Tommaso Piolatto
Preceded by Bonaventura Furlani	Bishop of Alatri; 1597–1620	Succeeded by Francesco Campanari
