= Michelangelo Brancavalerio =

Most Reverend Michelangelo Brancavalerio
- Bishop of Alatri
- Church: Catholic Church
- Diocese: Diocese of Alatri
- In office: 1648–1683
- Predecessor: Alessandro Vittrici
- Successor: Stefano Ghirardelli

Orders
- Ordination: 16 March 1647
- Consecration: 17 May 1648 by Ciriaco Rocci

Personal details
- Born: October 1617 Rome, Papal States
- Died: 25 March 1683 (age 65) Alatri, Papal States

Michelangelo Brancavalerio (October 1617 – 25 March 1683) was a Roman Catholic prelate who served as Bishop of Alatri (1648–1683).

== Biography ==
Michelangelo Brancavalerio was born in Rome, Italy in October 1617 and ordained a priest on 16 March 1647. On 4 May 1648, he was appointed during the papacy of Pope Innocent X as Bishop of Alatri. On 17 May 1648, he was consecrated bishop by Ciriaco Rocci, Cardinal-Priest of San Salvatore in Lauro. He served as Bishop of Alatri until his death on 25 March 1683.

== External links and additional sources ==
- Cheney, David M. "Diocese of Alatri". Catholic-Hierarchy.org. (for Chronology of Bishops) ^{[self-published]}
- Chow, Gabriel. "Diocese of Alatri (Italy)". GCatholic.org. (for Chronology of Bishops) ^{[self-published]}

Catholic Church titles
Preceded by Alessandro Vittrici	Bishop of Alatri; 1648–1683	Succeeded by Stefano Ghirardelli
