= Francesco Campanari =

Italian Roman Catholic prelate

Most Reverend Francesco Campanari
- Bishop of Alatri
- Church: Catholic Church
- Diocese: Diocese of Alatri
- In office: 1620–1632
- Predecessor: Luca Antonio Gigli
- Successor: Alessandro Vittrici

Orders
- Consecration: 30 November 1620 by Giambattista Leni

Personal details
- Born: 1555 Veroli, Italy
- Died: 1632 (age 77) Alatri, Italy

Francesco Campanari (1555–1632) was a Roman Catholic prelate who served as Bishop of Alatri (1620–1632).

== Biography ==
Francesco Campanari was born in Veroli, Italy in 1555. On 16 November 1620, he was appointed during the papacy of Pope Paul V as Bishop of Alatri. On 30 November 1620, he was consecrated bishop by Giambattista Leni, Bishop of Ferrara, with Raffaele Inviziati, Bishop Emeritus of Cefalonia e Zante, and Francesco Mottini, Bishop of Brugnato, serving as co-consecrators. He served as Bishop of Alatri until his death in 1632.

== External links and additional sources ==
- Cheney, David M. "Diocese of Alatri". Catholic-Hierarchy.org. (for Chronology of Bishops) ^{[self-published]}
- Chow, Gabriel. "Diocese of Alatri (Italy)". GCatholic.org. (for Chronology of Bishops) ^{[self-published]}

Catholic Church titles
Preceded by Luca Antonio Gigli	Bishop of Alatri; 1620–1632	Succeeded by Alessandro Vittrici
