= Jacobelli Silvestri =

1xth-century Roman Catholic bishop

Most Reverend Jacobelli Silvestri
- Bishop of Alatri
- Church: Catholic Church
- Diocese: Diocese of Alatri
- In office: 1493–1516
- Predecessor: Giovanni de Rosso
- Successor: Graziano Santucci

Personal details
- Died: 1516

Jacobelli Silvestri (died 1516) was a Roman Catholic prelate who served as Bishop of Alatri (1493–1516).

== Biography ==
On 15 Apr 1493, Jacobelli Silvestri was appointed during the papacy of Pope Alexander VI as Bishop of Alatri. He served as Bishop of Alatri until his death in 1516.

== External links and additional sources ==
- Cheney, David M. "Diocese of Alatri". Catholic-Hierarchy.org. (for Chronology of Bishops) ^{[self-published]}
- Chow, Gabriel. "Diocese of Alatri (Italy)". GCatholic.org. (for Chronology of Bishops) ^{[self-published]}

Catholic Church titles
Preceded by Giovanni de Rosso	Bishop of Alatri; 1493–1516	Succeeded by Graziano Santucci
