= Filippo Ercolani =

Italian Roman Catholic prelate

Most Reverend Filippo Ercolani
- Bishop of Alatri
- Church: Catholic Church
- Diocese: Diocese of Alatri
- In office: 1530–1535
- Predecessor: Antonio Maria Ciocchi del Monte
- Successor: Agostino Spínola
- Previous post: Administrator of Alatri (1528–1530)

Orders
- Consecration: 10 Jul 1530 by Andrea della Valle

Filippo Ercolani (died 1535) was a Roman Catholic prelate who served as Bishop of Alatri (1530–1535) and Administrator of Alatri (1528–1530).

== Biography ==
On 20 Apr 1528, Filippo Ercolani was appointed during the papacy of Pope Clement VII as Administrator of Alatri until the appointment of Antonio Maria Ciocchi del Monte on 4 Feb 1530. Ciocchi del Monte resigned soon after and on 1 Jul 1530, Ercolani was appointed by Pope Clement VII as Bishop of Alatri. On 10 Jul 1530, he was consecrated bishop by Andrea della Valle, Cardinal-Priest of Santa Prisca. He served as Bishop of Alatri until his resignation in 1535.

== External links and additional sources ==
- Cheney, David M. "Diocese of Alatri". Catholic-Hierarchy.org. (for Chronology of Bishops) ^{[self-published]}
- Chow, Gabriel. "Diocese of Alatri (Italy)". GCatholic.org. (for Chronology of Bishops) ^{[self-published]}

Catholic Church titles
Preceded by Christopher Numar of Forlì	Administrator of Alatri; 1528–1530	Succeeded by Antonio Maria Ciocchi del Monte
Preceded by Antonio Maria Ciocchi del Monte	Bishop of Alatri; 1530–1535	Succeeded by Agostino Spínola
