= Antonio Maria Ciocchi del Monte =

Italian bishop and cardinal

His Eminence Antonio Maria Ciocchi del Monte
- Cardinal-Bishop of Porto–Santa Rufina
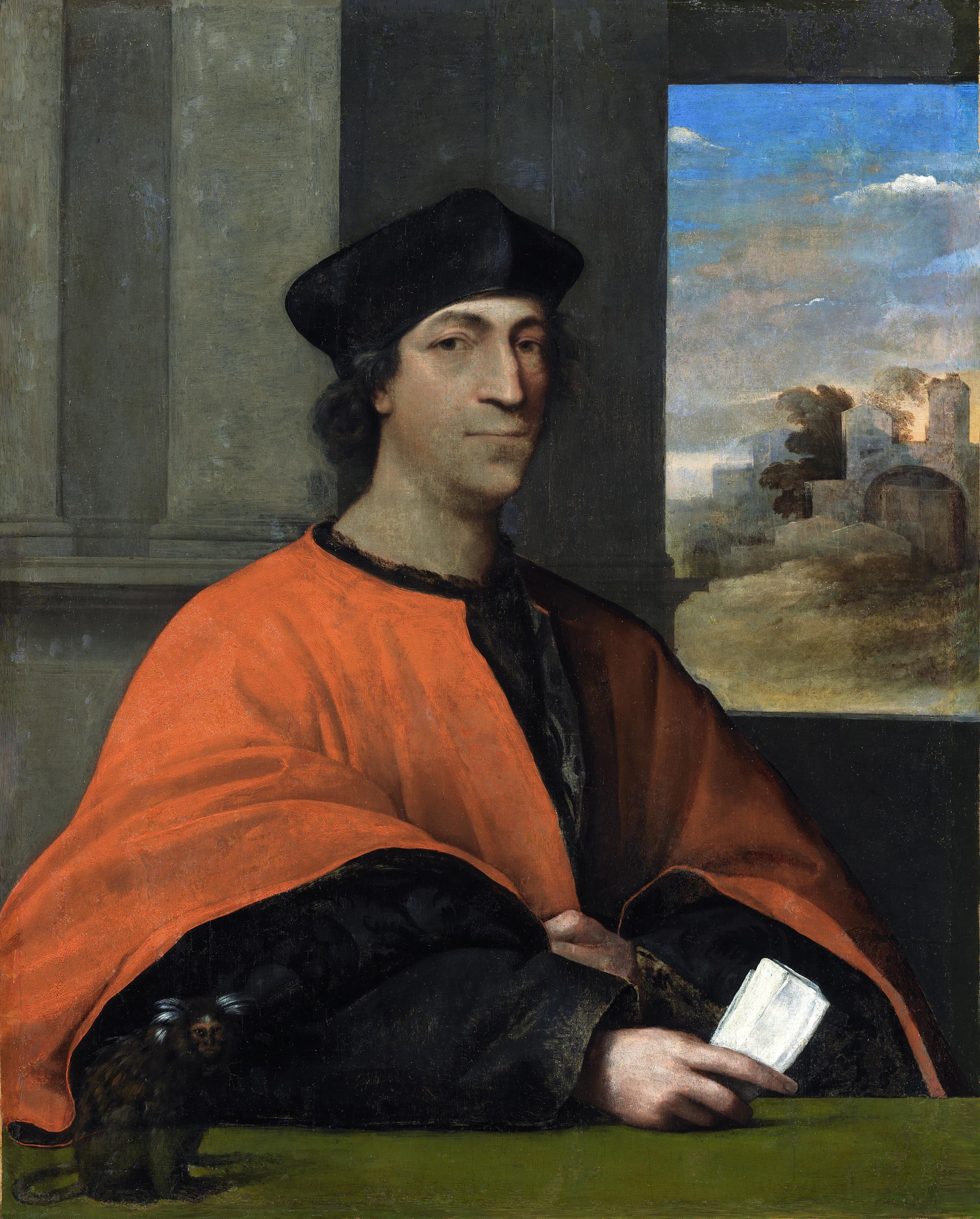
- Portrait by Sebastiano del Piombo, c. 1512-15
- Church: Catholic Church
- Diocese: Diocese of Porto–Santa Rufina
- Installed: June 1524
- Term ended: 20 September 1533
- Predecessor: Alessandro Farnese
- Successor: Giovanni Piccolomini
- Other posts: Administrator of Alatri (1529-1533)
- Previous posts: See list: Bishop of Città di Castello (1503–1506); Archbishop of Manfredonia (1506–1511); Cardinal-Priest of San Vitale (1511–1514); Administrator of Pavia (1511–1521); Cardinal-Priest of Santa Prassede (1514–1521); Administrator of Novara (1516–1525); Camerlengo of the Sacred College of Cardinals (1516-1517); Cardinal-Bishop of Albano (1521–1523); Cardinal-Bishop of Frascati (1523); Cardinal-Bishop of Palestrina (1523–1524); Administrator of Rimini (1529); Administrator of Caiazzo (1529)

Orders
- Consecration: 4 January 1506 by Tito Veltri di Viterbo
- Created cardinal: 10 March 1511 by Pope Julius II
- Rank: Cardinal-Bishop

Personal details
- Born: Antonio Maria Ciocchi del Monte San Savino; September 1466 Monte San Savino, Tuscany
- Died: 20 September 1533 (aged 66–67) Rome, Papal States
- Buried: San Pietro in Montorio
- Coat of arms

Antonio Maria Ciocchi del Monte San Savino (September 1461 - 20 September 1533) was an Italian Roman Catholic bishop and cardinal.

== Early years, ca. 1462–1503 ==
Antonio Maria Ciocchi del Monte San Savino was born in Monte San Savino sometime between late September 1461 and early September 1462. He was the son of Fabiano Ciocchi del Monte (Monte San Savino, 1421 - 1498) and wife Jacopa, daughter of Gaspare, whose family name is not known. His father dropped the surname "Ciocchi", taking "del Monte San Savino" as his surname (soon shortened to "del Monte"). Antonio Maria Ciocchi del Monte was the uncle of Pope Julius III.

As a young man, Ciocchi del Monte became a doctor of both laws. He then joined his older brother in Rome. He was soon appointed a consistorial advocate by the Roman Curia. His legal talents brought him to the attention of Pope Innocent VIII, who considered him a valuable advisor. Innocent VIII made him archpriest of Sant'Angelo in Vado, and, in 1492, archpriest of Arezzo.

Ciocchi del Monte also found favor with Pope Alexander VI. On 27 March 1493 Alexander VI made him an auditor of the Roman Rota. In 1495, he was made rector of Sant'Agnese in Arezzo, and in 1496, provost of San Luciano near Monte San Savino. After spending time attending to his pastoral duties, he was recalled to Rome in 1498 and placed in charge of the daily operations of the Roman Rota. In July 1502, the pope put him in charge of all operations of the Roman Rota in the areas under the control of the pope's son, Cesare Borgia. He set up a judicial seat in Cesena. He was also made a protonotary apostolic at this time. In early 1503, Cesare Borgia elevated Ciocchi del Monte to the post of governor of Romagna.

== Bishop, 1503–11 ==
On 4 August 1503 he was elected Bishop of Città di Castello. He was unable to take possession of this see, however, because it was claimed by Giulio Vitelli, backed by the force of arms of the powerful Vitelli family, even though Giulio Vitelli had been deprived of the office by Pope Alexander VI. Pope Julius II made Ciocchi del Monte governor of Cesena, and, on 26 July 1504, named him an auditor of the Apostolic Camera. The pope also confirmed that the diocese of Città di Castello belonged to Ciocchi del Monte and in June 1505, threatened to place Città di Castello under interdict. The city finally relented, and Ciocchi del Monte took possession of the diocese in July 1505. He was consecrated as a bishop in San Pietro in Vincoli in Rome on 4 January 1506 by Tito Veltri di Viterbo, Bishop of Castro. On 6 February 1506 he was promoted to the metropolitan see of Manfredonia, occupying that office until 30 May 1511.

== Cardinal, 1511–33 ==
Styles of Antonio Maria Ciocchi del Monte
- Reference style: His Eminence
- Spoken style: Your Eminence
- Religious style: Cardinal
- Informal style: Cardinal
- See: Diocese of Porto–Santa Rufina (suburbicarain)

Pope Julius II made him a cardinal priest in the consistory of 10 March 1511. He received the red hat on 13 March 1511, and the titular church of San Vitale on 17 March 1511.

A short time later, he became the cardinal protector of the Servite Order. From 30 May 1511 to 13 March 1521, he was the administrator of the see of Pavia.

In 1511, the pope placed Cardinal Ciocchi del Monte in charge of dealing with the four cardinals who had joined in the proposal of Louis XII of France to hold a schismatic council at Pisa. In this capacity, he was crucial in convincing Pope Julius II to call the Fifth Council of the Lateran and played a large role in organizing that council. He was made a member of the council's commission for the reform of the Roman Curia and its officials on 3 June 1513.

He participated in the papal conclave of 1513 that elected Pope Leo X. The new pope sent him to Umbria to restore order following the chaos brought about by Louis XII's invasion of that province. The cardinal opted for the titular church of Santa Prassede on 14 July 1514. He served as Camerlengo of the Sacred College of Cardinals from 1516 to 1517. He was also administrator of the see of Novara from 19 April 1516 until 20 December 1525.

In spring 1517, several cardinals participated in a conspiracy to assassinate Pope Leo X. The pope placed Cardinal Ciocchi del Monte in charge of pursuing the case against the ringleaders of the conspiracy, Cardinals Alfonso Petrucci and Bandinello Sauli. He successfully secured their convictions and those two cardinals were executed.

Cardinal Ciocchi del Monte opted for the order of cardinal bishops on 24 July 1521, receiving the Suburbicarian Diocese of Albano.

He participated in the papal conclave of 1521–22 that elected Pope Adrian VI. In February 1523, the new pope placed him in charge of a commission in charge of reducing expenditures by reducing curial offices created by Leo X. In the consistory of 23 July 1523, Cardinal Ciocchi del Monte opposed the creation of a defensive league with Charles V, Holy Roman Emperor, fearing it would strain relations with Francis I of France.

He participated in the papal conclave of 1523 that elected Pope Clement VII. The new pope named him cardinal protector of the Oratory of Divine Love, the predecessor of the Theatines; he filled this role until 1529. On 9 December 1523 he opted for the Suburbicarian Diocese of Frascati, on 18 December 1523 for the Suburbicarian Diocese of Palestrina, on 20 May 1524 for the Suburbicarian Diocese of Sabina and on 14 June 1524 for the Suburbicarian Diocese of Porto-Santa Rufina. He also became Vice-Dean of the College of Cardinals at this time.

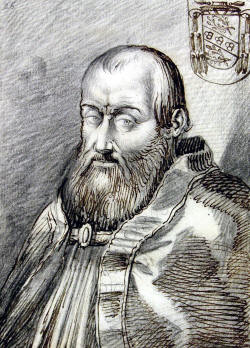
An older Cardinal Ciocchi del Monte

In 1526, Pope Clement VII concluded the treaty forming the League of Cognac, allying the Papal States with the Kingdom of France, the Republic of Venice, and the House of Sforza against Charles V, Holy Roman Emperor. On 22 May 1526 Cardinal Ciocchi del Monte was one of the leading commissioners responsible for preparing the Papal States for the War of the League of Cognac. His efforts, however, were totally inadequate to prevent the Sack of Rome (1527). He was one of the small number of cardinals who remained loyal to the pope, seeking refuge with him in the Castel Sant'Angelo. On 5 June 1527 he was one of the seven cardinals who signed the capitulation to the imperial forces and his nephew, Giovanni Maria Ciocchi del Monte (the future Pope Julius III) was taken hostage by imperial forces.

From 1528, he was one of the leading cardinals responsible for dealing with Henry VIII of England's attempts to secure a divorce from Catherine of Aragon. The cardinal supported King Henry's attempts to secure a divorce, and was friendly with the English embassy; he was, however, unable to convince the pope to grant the request for a divorce.

From February to July 1530 he was administrator of the see of Alatri. When Charles V wrote to the pope and the College of Cardinals in 1530 requesting a general council to resolve the question of the rise of Lutheranism in Germany, Cardinal Ciocchi del Monte rushed back to Rome and voiced his support for the proposal. No council was forthcoming, however.

When the pope travelled to Marseille in September 1533 to attend the marriage of Henry II, Duke of Orléans and Catherine de' Medici, he left Cardinal Ciocchi del Monte in charge of Rome as papal legate. The pope agreed to the cardinal's request to allow his nephew Giovanni Maria Ciocchi del Monte to assist in the discharge of these duties.

He died in Rome on 20 September 1533. He was buried in San Pietro in Montorio. When his nephew became pope, he commissioned Giorgio Vasari and Bartolomeo Ammannati to work on the cardinal's tomb.

Catholic Church titles
Preceded by Giulio Vitelli	Bishop of Città di Castello; 1503–1506	Succeeded by Achille Grassi
Preceded by Agapito Gerardini	Archbishop of Manfredonia; 1506–1511	Succeeded by Giovanni Maria Ciocchi del Monte
Preceded by René de Prie	Cardinal-Priest of San Vitale; 1511–1514	Succeeded by Francesco Conti
Preceded by Francesco Alidosi	Administrator of Pavia; 1511–1521	Succeeded by Giovanni Maria Ciocchi del Monte
Preceded by Christopher Bainbridge	Cardinal-Priest of Santa Prassede; 1514–1521	Succeeded by Ippolito de' Medici
Preceded by Matthäus Schiner	Administrator of Novara; 1516–1525	Succeeded by Ermete Stampa
Preceded by Niccolò Fieschi	Cardinal-Bishop of Albano; 1521–1523	Succeeded by Pietro de Accolti de Aretio
Preceded by Alessandro Farnese	Cardinal-Bishop of Frascati; 1523	Succeeded by François Guillaume de Castelnau de Clermont-Ludève
Preceded by Alessandro Farnese	Cardinal-Bishop of Palestrina; 1523–1524	Succeeded by Pietro de Accolti de Aretio
Preceded by Alessandro Farnese	Cardinal-Bishop of Sabina; 1524	Succeeded by Pietro de Accolti de Aretio
Preceded by Alessandro Farnese	Cardinal-Bishop of Porto e Santa Rufina; 1524–1533	Succeeded by Giovanni Piccolomini
Preceded by Franciotto Orsini	Administrator of Rimini; 1529	Succeeded by Ascanio Parisani
Preceded by Ascanio Parisani	Administrator of Caiazzo; 1529	Succeeded by Alexander Mirto Frangipani
Preceded by Filippo Ercolani	Administrator of Alatri; 1529–1533	Succeeded by Filippo Ercolani
