= Graziano Santucci =

1xth-century Roman Catholic bishop

Most Reverend Graziano Santucci
- Bishop of Alatri
- Church: Catholic Church
- Diocese: Diocese of Alatri
- In office: 1516–1516
- Predecessor: Jacobelli Silvestri
- Successor: Cristoforo Numai

Personal details
- Died: 1517

Graziano Santucci, O.S.A. (died 1517) was a Roman Catholic prelate who served as Bishop of Alatri (1516–1517).

== Biography ==
Graziano Santucci was ordained a priest in the Order of Saint Augustine. On 11 Nov 1516, he was appointed during the papacy of Pope Leo X as Bishop of Alatri. He served as Bishop of Alatri until his death in 1517.

== External links and additional sources ==
- Cheney, David M. "Diocese of Alatri". Catholic-Hierarchy.org. (for Chronology of Bishops) ^{[self-published]}
- Chow, Gabriel. "Diocese of Alatri (Italy)". GCatholic.org. (for Chronology of Bishops) ^{[self-published]}

Catholic Church titles
| Preceded by Jacobelli Silvestri | Bishop of Alatri; 1516–1517 | Succeeded by Cristoforo Numai |
