= Agostino Spinola (bishop of Perugia) =

Italian bishop and cardinal

His Eminence Agostino Spínola
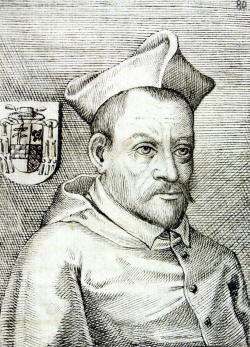
- Agostino Spinola
- Church: Catholic Church

Personal details
- Born: 1482 Savona, Republic of Genoa
- Died: 18 October 1537 (age 55)

Coat of arms of Cardinal Agostino Spinola

Agostino Spinola (c. 1482–1537) was an Italian Roman Catholic bishop and cardinal.

== Biography ==
A member of the Spinola family, Agostino Spinola was born in Savona, Italy ca. 1482, the son of Giovanni Spinola, consignore of Garessio, and Petruccia Riario. He was a grand-nephew of Pope Sixtus IV. He was a cousin of Cardinal Raffaele Riario.

Early in his life, he was a secretary of Pope Julius II.

On 19 December 1509 he was elected Bishop of Perugia. He participated in the ninth through the twelfth sessions of the Fifth Council of the Lateran (1512–17). He accompanied Pope Leo X on his trip to Bologna.

Pope Clement VII made him a cardinal priest in the consistory of 3 May 1527. He received the red hat and the titular church of San Ciriaco alle Terme Diocleziane on 3 August 1527. He was the administrator of the see of Savona from 17 July 1528 until his death. He resigned the administration of Perugia in favor of his brother Carlo Spinola on 15 February 1529. He was the Camerlengo of the Sacred College of Cardinals from 1 January 1532 to 8 January 1533. On 5 September 1534 he opted for the titular church of Sant'Apollinare alle Terme Neroniane-Alessandrine.

He participated in the papal conclave of 1534 that elected Pope Paul III. From 10 May 1535 until his death he was also the administrator of the see of Altari.

He died in Rome on 18 October 1537. He was buried in the convent of San Domenico in Savona. When that church was demolished in 1544, the marble bas-relief of his tomb was placed in the Palazzo Pozzobonello-Del Carretto.

== Episcopal succession ==
While bishop, he was the principal consecrator of:

- Giacomo Simonetta, Bishop of Pesaro (1529);
- Paolo Capizucchi, Bishop of Nicastro (1535); and
- Baldo Ferratini, Bishop of Lipari (1537).

Catholic Church titles
Preceded by Matteo Baldeschi degli Ubaldi	Bishop of Perugia; 1509–1529	Succeeded by Carlo Spinola
Preceded by Scaramuccia Trivulzio	Cardinal-Priest of San Ciriaco alle Terme Diocleziane; 1527–1534	Succeeded by Francesco Cornaro (seniore)
Preceded by Tommaso Giovanni Riario	Administrator of Savona; 1528–1537	Succeeded by Giacomo Fieschi
Preceded by Antonio Sanseverino	Cardinal-Priest of Sant'Apollinare; 1534–1537	Succeeded by Giacomo Simonetta
Preceded by Filippo Ercolani	Administrator of Alatri; 1535–1537	Succeeded by Bernardino Visconti
