= Bonaventura Furlani =

Most Reverend Bonaventura Furlani
- Bishop of Alatri
- Church: Catholic Church
- Diocese: Diocese of Alatri
- In office: 1586–1597
- Predecessor: Ignazio Danti (bishop)
- Successor: Luca Antonio Gigli

Orders
- Consecration: 18 November 1586 by Marco Antonio Marsilio

Personal details
- Died: December 1597 Alatri, Italy

Bonaventura Furlani, O.F.M. Conv. (died December 1597) was a Roman Catholic prelate who served as Bishop of Alatri (1586–1597).

== Biography ==
Bonaventura Furlani was ordained a priest in the Order of Friars Minor Conventual. On 5 November 1586, he was appointed during the papacy of Pope Sixtus V as Bishop of Alatri. On 18 November 1586, he was consecrated bishop by Marco Antonio Marsilio, Archbishop of Salerno, and Francesco Rusticucci, Bishop of Fano, and Matteo Colli, Bishop of Marsi, serving as co-consecrators. He served as Bishop of Alatri until his death in December 1597.

== External links and additional sources ==
- Cheney, David M. "Diocese of Alatri". Catholic-Hierarchy.org. (for Chronology of Bishops) ^{[self-published]}
- Chow, Gabriel. "Diocese of Alatri (Italy)". GCatholic.org. (for Chronology of Bishops) ^{[self-published]}

Catholic Church titles
Preceded by Ignazio Danti (bishop)	Bishop of Alatri; 1586–1597	Succeeded by Luca Antonio Gigli
