= Stefano Ghirardelli =

Roman Catholic prelate

Most Reverend Stefano Ghirardelli
- Bishop of Alatri
- Church: Catholic Church
- Diocese: Diocese of Alatri
- In office: 1683–1708
- Predecessor: Michelangelo Brancavalerio
- Successor: Giuseppe Guerra

Orders
- Consecration: 20 June 1683 by Alessandro Crescenzi (cardinal)

Personal details
- Born: 1633 Rome, Italy
- Died: February 1708 (aged 74–75) Alatri, Italy

Stefano Ghirardelli (1633 – February, 1708) was a Roman Catholic prelate who served as Bishop of Alatri (1683–1708).

== Biography ==
Stefano Ghirardelli was born in Rome, Italy in 1633. On 14 June 1683, he was appointed during the papacy of Pope Innocent XI as Bishop of Alatri. On 20 June 1683, he was consecrated bishop by Alessandro Crescenzi (cardinal), Cardinal-Priest of Santa Prisca, with Pier Antonio Capobianco, Bishop Emeritus of Lacedonia, and Francesco Maria Giannotti, Bishop of Segni, serving as co-consecrators. He served as Bishop of Alatri until his death in February 1708.

== External links and additional sources ==
- Cheney, David M. "Diocese of Alatri". Catholic-Hierarchy.org. (for Chronology of Bishops) ^{[self-published]}
- Chow, Gabriel. "Diocese of Alatri (Italy)". GCatholic.org. (for Chronology of Bishops) ^{[self-published]}

Catholic Church titles
Preceded by Michelangelo Brancavalerio	Bishop of Alatri; 1683–1708	Succeeded by Giuseppe Guerra
