= Bernardino Visconti =

16th-century Roman Catholic bishop

Most Reverend Bernardino Visconti
- Bishop of Alatri
- Church: Catholic Church
- Diocese: Diocese of Alatri
- In office: 1537–1540
- Predecessor: Agostino Spínola
- Successor: Valerio Tartarini

Orders
- Consecration: 30 Dec 1537 by Alfonso Oliva

Personal details
- Died: 1540 Rome, Italy

Bernardino Visconti or Bernardino Conti (died 1540) was a Roman Catholic prelate who served as Bishop of Alatri (1537–1540).

On 29 October 1537, Bernardino Visconti was appointed during the papacy of Pope Paul III as Bishop of Alatri. On 30 December 1537, he was consecrated bishop by Alfonso Oliva, Bishop of Bovino. He served as Bishop of Alatri until his death in 1540 in Rome, Italy.

== External links and additional sources ==
- Cheney, David M. "Diocese of Alatri". Catholic-Hierarchy.org. (for Chronology of Bishops) ^{[self-published]}
- Chow, Gabriel. "Diocese of Alatri (Italy)". GCatholic.org. (for Chronology of Bishops) ^{[self-published]}

Catholic Church titles
Preceded by Agostino Spínola	Bishop of Alatri; 1537–1540	Succeeded by Valerio Tartarini
