= 1534 conclave =

Election of Catholic Pope Paul III

Papal conclave October 1534

Dates and location
- 11–13 October 1534; Cappella Parva, Apostolic Palace, Papal States

Key officials
- Dean: Alessandro Farnese
- Sub-dean: Giovanni Piccolomini
- Camerlengo: Agostino Spinola
- Protopriest: Francesco Cornaro
- Protodeacon: Innocenzo Cybo

Election
- Ballots: 1

Elected pope
- Alessandro Farnese; Name taken: Paul III
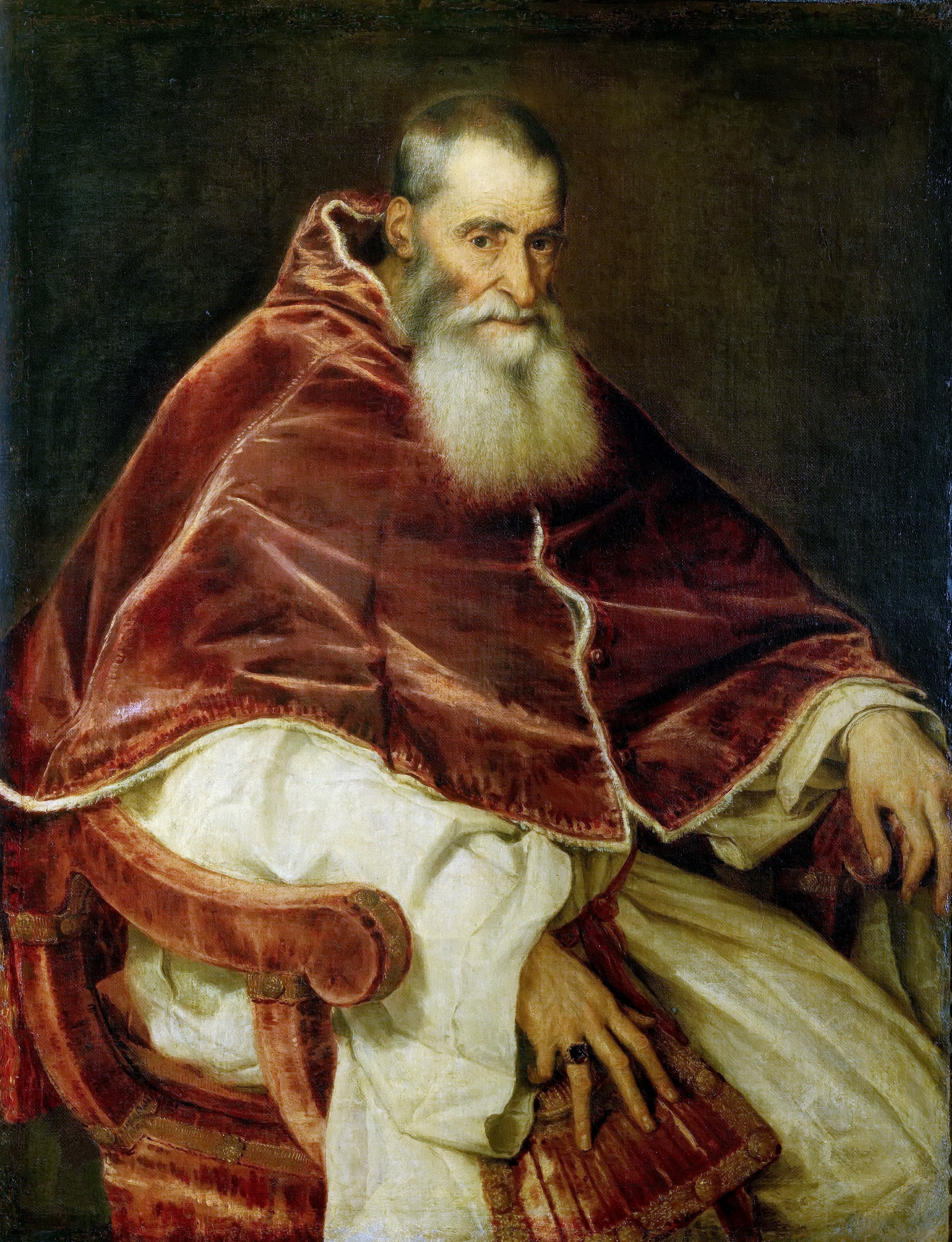

The 1534 papal conclave (11 October – 13 October) was convened after the death of Pope Clement VII, and elected as his successor Cardinal Alessandro Farnese, who became Pope Paul III.

== Candidates to the papacy ==
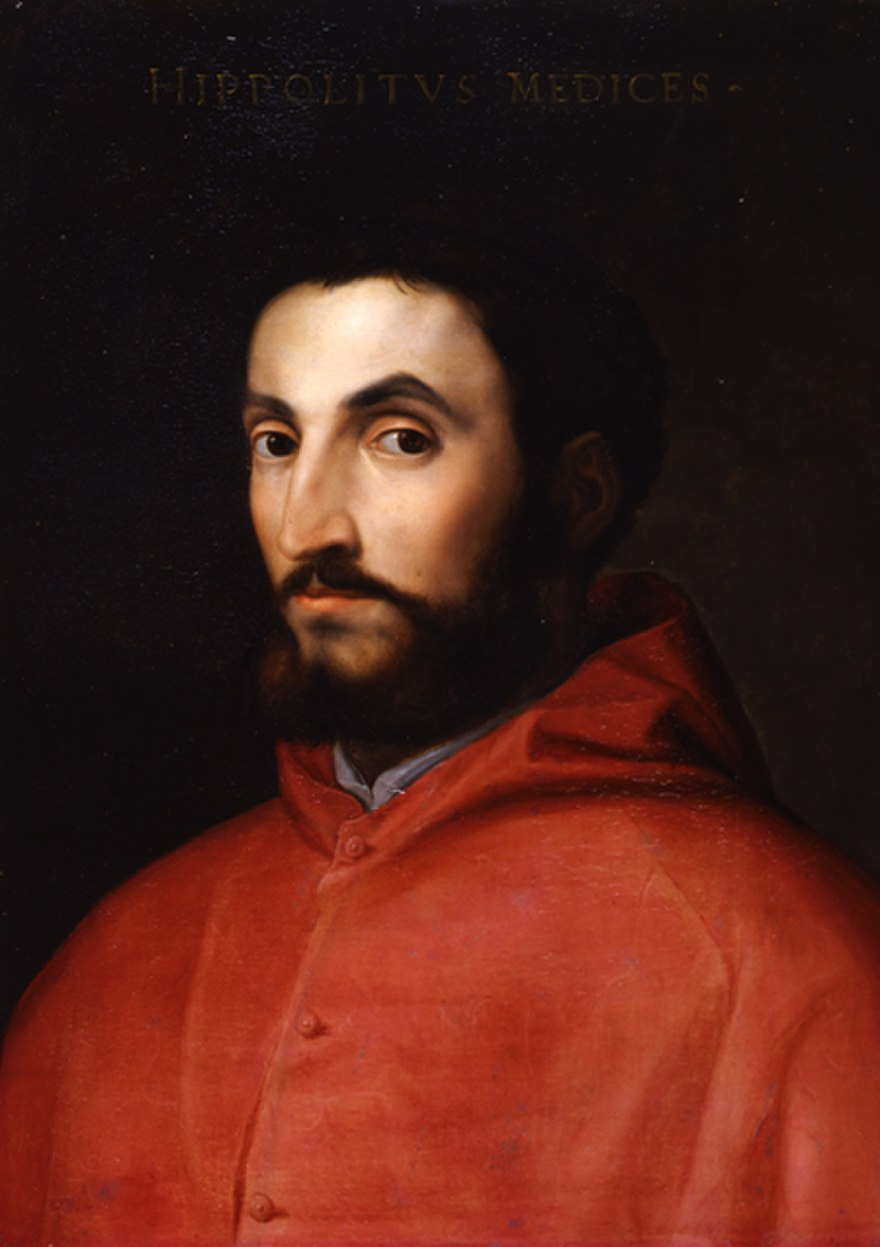
Cardinal Ippolito de' Medici

Although several Cardinals were considered papabili, it was generally thought that Cardinal Alessandro Farnese, dean of the Sacred College, had the best prospects for the election. He had already official support of the king Francis I of France and of Cardinal Medici, leader of Italian party, who realized this way the will of his uncle Clement VII, but, as neutral, he was also acceptable for the Imperial faction. Emperor Charles V declared this time a total disinterest in the result of the papal election, because the last two Popes, Clement VII and Adrian VI, whom he had helped to obtain the tiara, failed his hopes. The great advantage of the Cardinal Dean was his relatively advanced age (66) and poor health. It indicated that his pontificate would be very short, so even those cardinals, who themselves had papal ambitions (f.e. Trivulzio), inclined to vote for him, hoping for the next conclave in the near future.

== The election of Pope Paul III ==
Conclave began on October 11, but the first electoral assembly took place on the next day. Cardinal de Lorraine in the name of king of France officially proposed the candidature of Farnese, and this initiative immediately obtained the support of Trivulzio, leader of pro-French Italians, and of Medici, leader of the Italian party. The consent of Imperialists was also quickly achieved, and in the evening it was clear that Alessandro Farnese would be elected unanimously. On October 13 in the morning a formal scrutiny took place, but it was a mere formality: Farnese received all votes except of his own. He accepted his election and took the name of Paul III. On November 3 he was solemnly crowned by Protodeacon Innocenzo Cibo.

== List of participants ==
Pope Clement VII died on September 25, 1534. At the time of his death, there were forty six Cardinals, but only thirty five of them participated in the election of his successor:

- Alessandro Farnese (created Cardinal on September 20, 1493) – Cardinal-Bishop of Ostia e Velletri; commendatario of S. Eustachio; Dean of the Sacred College of Cardinals; Bishop of Parma and Bishop of Saint-Pons-de-Thomières; Archpriest of the patriarchal Lateran Basilica
- Giovanni Piccolomini (July 1, 1517) – Cardinal-Bishop of Porto e Santa Rufina; Sub-dean of the Sacred College of Cardinals
- Giovanni Domenico de Cupis (July 1, 1517) – Cardinal-Bishop of Sabina; commendatario of S. Lorenzo in Lucina; Bishop of Nardò; Administrator of Trani, Macerata e Recanati, Adria and Montepeloso
- Bonifacio Ferrero (July 1, 1517) – Cardinal-Bishop of Palestrina
- Lorenzo Campeggio (July 1, 1517) – Cardinal-Bishop of Albano; Administrator of Salisbury, Porenza and Crete; Cardinal-protector of England
- Francesco Cornaro (December 20, 1527) – Cardinal-Priest of S. Ciriaco alla Terme; Archpriest of the Sacred College of Cardinals; Archpriest of the patriarchal Vatican Basilica
- Matthew Lang von Wellenberg (March 10, 1511) – Cardinal-Priest of S. Angelo in Pescheria; Archbishop of Salzburg; Bishop of Cartagena
- Louis de Bourbon de Vendôme (July 1, 1517) – Cardinal-Priest of S. Sabina; Bishop of Laon; Administrator of Le Mans
- Benedetto Accolti the Younger (May 3, 1527) – Cardinal-Priest of S. Eusebio; Archbishop of Ravenna; Administrator of Cremona, Policastro and Bovino; Cardinal-protector of Spain
- Agostino Spinola (May 3, 1527) – Cardinal-Priest of S. Apollinare; Camerlengo of the Holy Roman Church; Administrator of Savona
- Marino Grimani (May 3, 1527) – Cardinal-Priest of S. Marcello; Administrator of Ceneda, Concordia and Città di Castello
- Antonio Sanseverino, O.S.Io.Hieros. (November 21, 1527) – Cardinal-Priest of S. Maria in Trastevere; Archbishop of Taranto; Cardinal-protector of the Order of Capuchins
- Gianvincenzo Carafa (November 21, 1527) – Cardinal-Priest of S. Pudenziana; Administrator of Anglona
- Andrea Matteo Palmieri (November 21, 1527) – Cardinal-Priest of S. Clemente; Administrator of Lucera; Camerlengo of the Sacred College of Cardinals
- Francisco de Quiñones (December 7, 1527) – Cardinal-Priest of S. Croce in Gerusalemme; Governor of Veroli and Campagna
- Ippolito de' Medici (January 10, 1529) – Cardinal-Priest of S. Lorenzo in Damaso; Vice-Chancellor of the Holy Roman Church; Archbishop of Avignon; Administrator of Monreale and Lecce; Legate in Marche
- François de Tournon (March 9, 1530) – Cardinal-Priest of SS. Marcellino e Pietro; Archbishop of Bourges
- Bernhard von Cles (March 9, 1530) – Cardinal-Priest of S. Stefano al Monte Celio; Bishop of Trent; president of the Imperial Secret Council
- Antonio Pucci (September 22, 1531) – Cardinal-Priest of SS. IV Coronati; Grand penitentiary; Bishop of Pistoia and Vannes; Cardinal-protector of Poland and Portugal
- Esteban Gabriel Merino (February 21, 1533) – Cardinal-Priest of SS. Giovanni e Paolo; Patriarch of the West Indies; Bishop of Jaén
- Jean Le Veneur (November 7, 1533) – Cardinal-Priest of S. Bartolomeo all'Isola; Bishop of Lisieux
- Philippe de la Chambre, O.S.B. (November 7, 1533) – Cardinal-Priest of SS. Martino ai Monti
- Innocenzo Cibo (September 23, 1513) – Cardinal-Deacon of S. Maria in Domnica; Protodeacon of Sacred College of Cardinals; Archbishop of Genoa; Administrator of Turin; Legate in Bologna
- Paolo Emilio Cesi (July 1, 1517) – Cardinal-Deacon of S. Eustachio; Administrator of Orte e Civita Castellana; Archpriest of the patriarchal Liberian Basilica; Prefect of the Apostolic Signature; Cardinal-protector of the Duchy of Savoy
- Alessandro Cesarini (July 1, 1517) – Cardinal-Deacon of S. Maria in Via Lata; Administrator of Pamplona, Gerace and Otranto
- Giovanni Salviati (July 1, 1517) – Cardinal-Deacon of S. Cosma e Damiano; Administrator of Santa Severina, Ferrara, Teano and Bitetto
- Nicolò Ridolfi (July 1, 1517) – Cardinal-Deacon of S. Maria in Cosmedin; Administrator of Vicenza, Imola and Salerno
- Agostino Trivulzio (July 1, 1517) – Cardinal-Deacon of S. Adriano; Administrator of Toulon and Bayeux; Legate in Marittima e Capmagna
- Francesco Pisani (July 1, 1517) – Cardinal-Deacon of S. Marco; commendatario of S. Maria in Portico and S. Agata in Suburba; Bishop of Padua; Administrator of Treviso and Cittànova
- Jean de Lorraine (May 28, 1518) – Cardinal-Deacon of S. Onofrio; Bishop of Metz; Administrator of Narbonne, Reims and Verdun
- Ercole Gonzaga (May 3, 1527) – Cardinal-Deacon of S. Maria Nuova; Bishop of Mantua; Governor of Tivoli; Cardinal-protector of Spain
- Girolamo Grimaldi (November 21, 1527) – Cardinal-Deacon of S. Giorgio in Velabro; Administrator of Bari, Brugnato and Venafro
- Girolamo Doria (January, 1529) – Cardinal-Deacon of S. Tommaso in Parione; Administrator of Noli and Tarragona
- Niccolò Gaddi (May 3, 1527) – Cardinal-Deacon of S. Teodoro; Bishop of Fermo; Administrator of Cosenza and Sarlat; Cardinal-protector of France
- Odet de Coligny de Châtillon (November 7, 1533) – Cardinal-Deacon of SS. Sergio e Bacco; Administrator of Toulouse

Twenty electors were created by Clement VII and thirteen of Leo X. Cardinal Dean Farnese was created by Alexander VI, while Cardinal Lang von Wellenberg by Julius II.

== Absentees ==
Eleven Cardinals did not participate in this conclave:

- François Guillaume de Castelnau-Clermont-Lodève (November 29, 1503) – Cardinal-Bishop of Frascati, Archbishop of Auch; Bishop of Agde; Legate in Avignon
- Albert of Mainz (March 24, 1518) – Cardinal-Priest of S. Pietro in Vincoli; Archbishop of Mainz; Archbishop of Magdeburg; Administrator of Halberstadt
- Érard de La Marck (August 9, 1520) – Cardinal-Priest of S. Crisogono; Bishop of Liège; Administrator of Valencia
- Antoine du Prat (November 21, 1527) – Cardinal-Priest of S. Anastasia; Archbishop of Sens; Administrator of Albi and Meaux; Chancellor of the Kingdom of France
- Louis de Gorrevod (March 9, 1530) – Cardinal-Priest of S. Cesareo in Palatio; Bishop of Bourg-en-Bresse; Papal Legate in the Duchy of Savoy
- García de Loaysa, O.P. (March 9, 1530) – Cardinal-Priest of S. Anastasia; Bishop of Sigüenza; president of Consejo Real y Supremo de las Indias
- Íñigo López de Mendoza y Zúñiga (March 9, 1530) – Cardinal-Priest of S. Nicola in Carcere Tulliano; Bishop of Burgos
- Alonso Manrique de Lara (February 22, 1531) – Cardinal-Priest of SS. XII Apostoli; Archbishop of Seville; Grand Inquisitor of Spain
- Juan Pardo de Tavera (February 22, 1531) – Cardinal-Priest of S. Giovanni a Porta Latina; Archbishop of Toledo; president of the Royal Council of Spain
- Claude de Longwy de Givry (November 7, 1533) – Cardinal-Priest of S. Agnese in Agone; Administrator of Poitiers and Langres
- Alfonso de Portugal (July 1, 1517) – Cardinal-Deacon of Santa Lucia in Septisolio; Archbishop of Lisbon and Évora

Seven absentees were creatures of Clement VII, three of Leo X and one of Julius II.

== Divisions among Cardinals ==
College of Cardinals was divided into three factions:

- Italian party – it grouped ten Italian Cardinals (Pucci, Salviati, Ridolfi, Medici, Cibo, Spinola, Grimaldi, Cupis, Cesi and Doria). Their leader was Vice-Chancellor Ippolito de' Medici, Cardinal-nephew of Clement VII.
- French party – it included six French Cardinals and five Italians (Trivulzio, Sanseverino, Pisani, Gaddi and Palmieri). The leaders of this party were de Lorraine and Tournon.
- Imperial faction – included seven Italians (Piccolomini, Cesarini, Vincenzo Carafa, Ercole Gonzaga, Campeggio, Grimani and Accolti) as well as two Spanish and two German Cardinals.

Cardinals Farnese, Ferreri and Cornaro were considered neutral.

== See also ==
- List of popes

== Sources ==
- List of participants of papal conclave of 1534 (by Salvador Miranda)
- Valérie Pirie: The Triple Crown: An Account of the Papal Conclaves. Paul III (Farnese).
- Vatican History
- L. Pastor "History of the Popes vol. XI", London 1912 (available here)
