= Vatican Gallery of Maps =

Art gallery near the Belvedere Courtyard

Coordinates: 41°54′15″N 012°27′17″E

Gallery of Maps
- Galleria delle carte geografiche
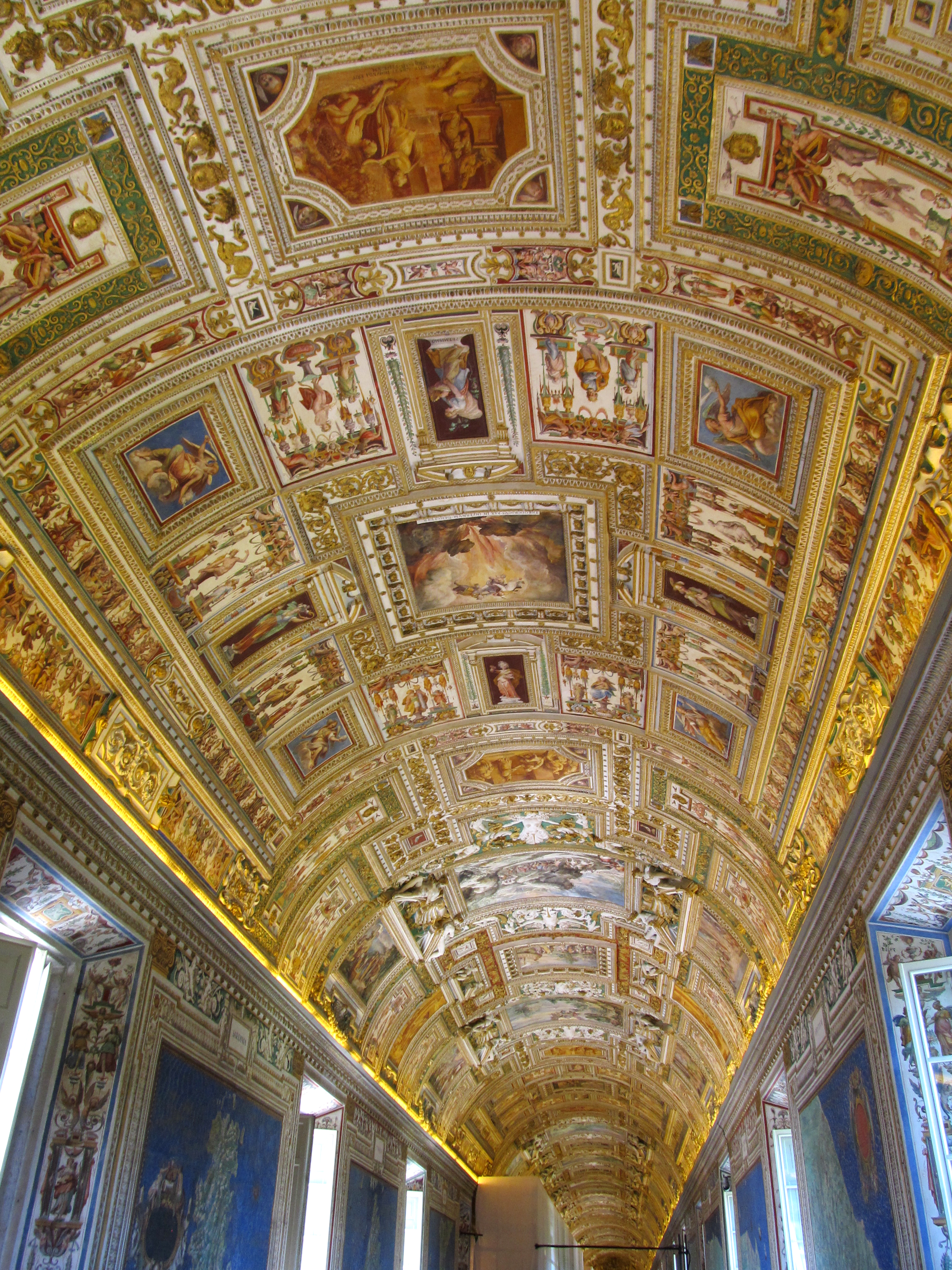
- Ceiling of the Gallery

- Location within Vatican City
- Established: 1580; 446 years ago
- Location: Vatican City
- Founder: Pope Gregory XIII
- Owner: Holy See
- Website: museivaticani.va

The Gallery of Maps (Italian: Galleria delle carte geografiche) is a gallery located on the west side of the Belvedere Courtyard in the Vatican containing a series of painted topographical maps of Italy based on drawings by friar and geographer Ignazio Danti.

The gallery was commissioned in 1580 by Pope Gregory XIII as part of other artistic works commissioned by the Pope to decorate the Vatican. It took Danti three years (1580–1583) to complete the 40 panels of the 120 m long gallery. The painter was Antonio Danti, brother of Ignazio.

== Design ==
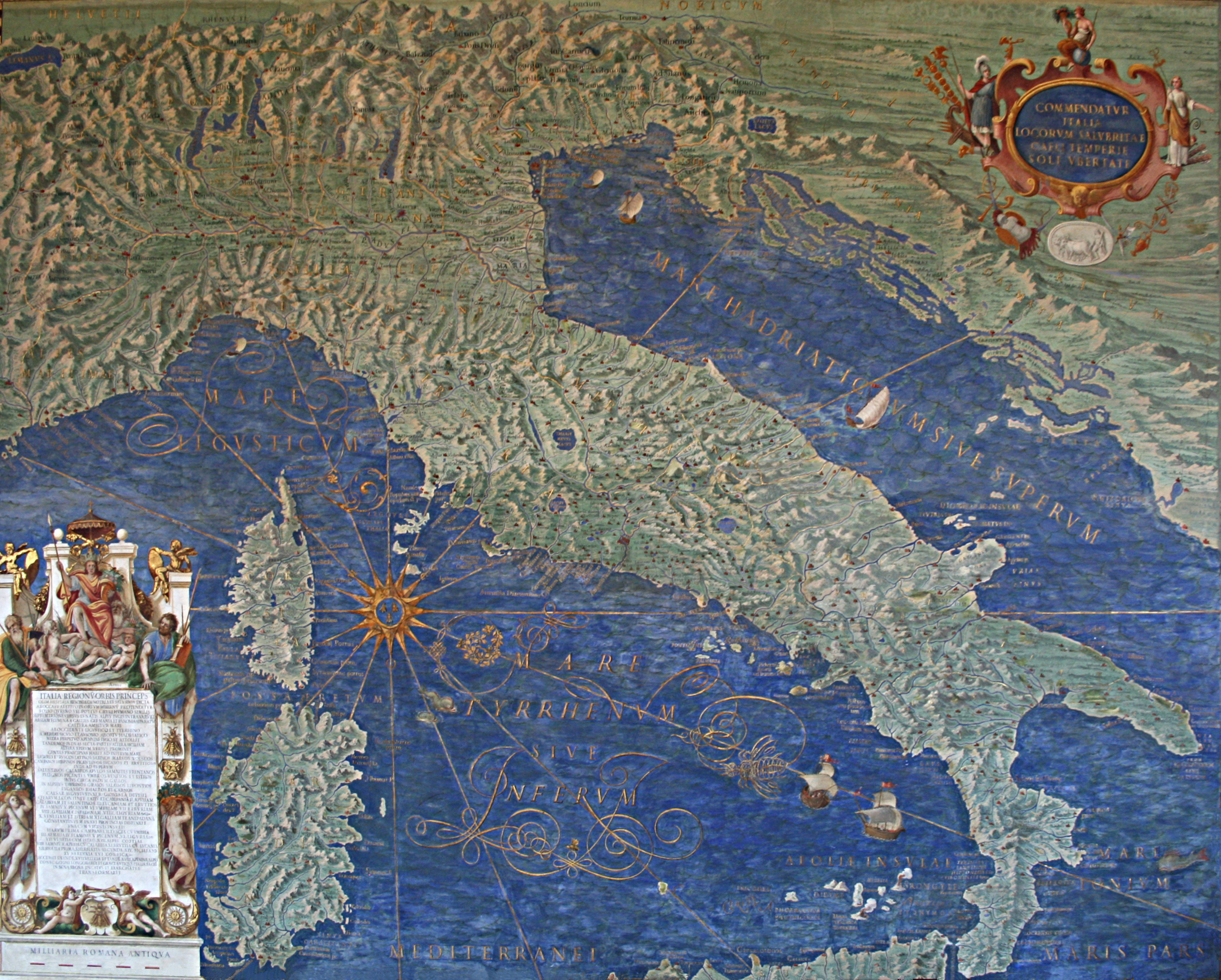
Map of Italy

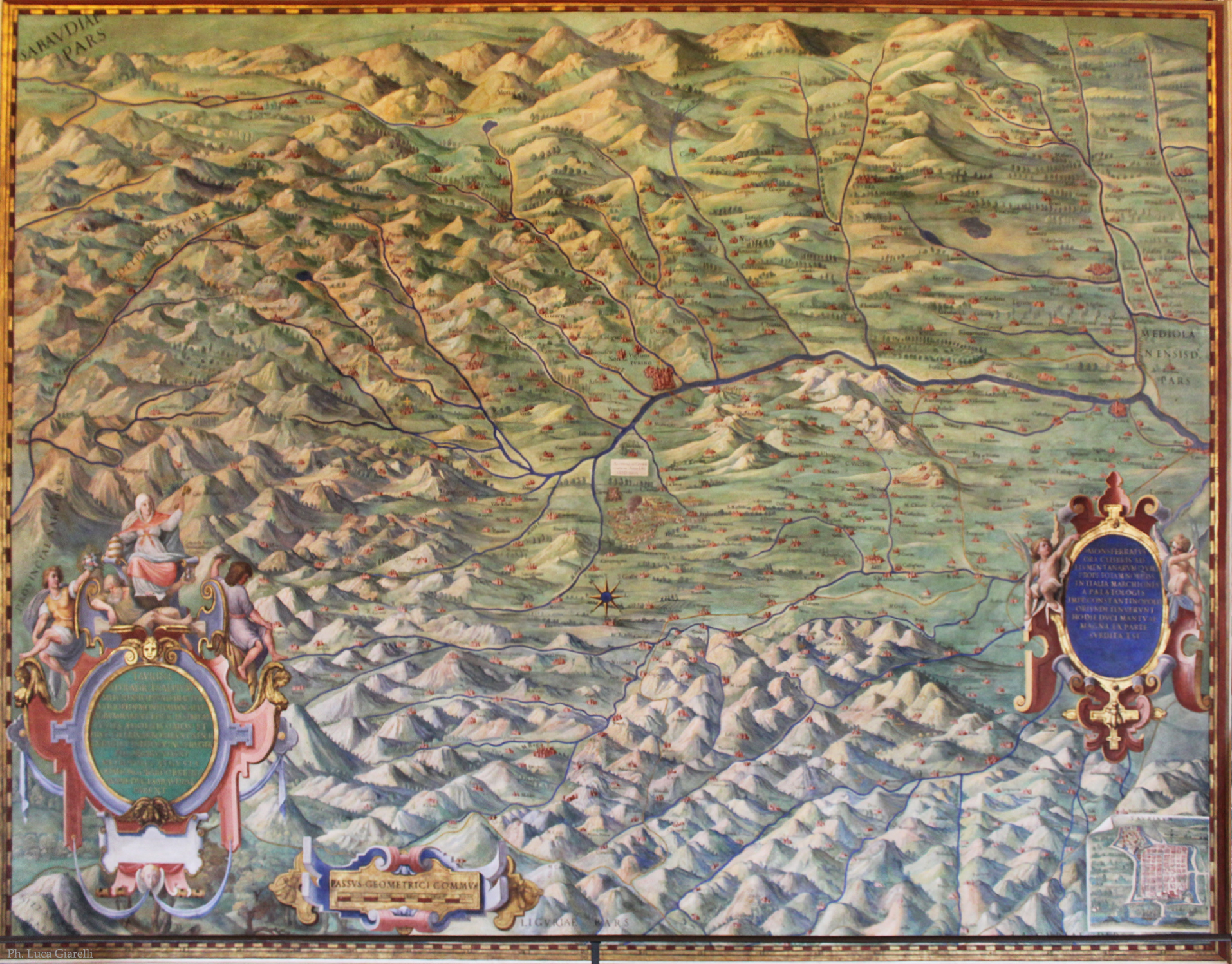
Map of Montferrat

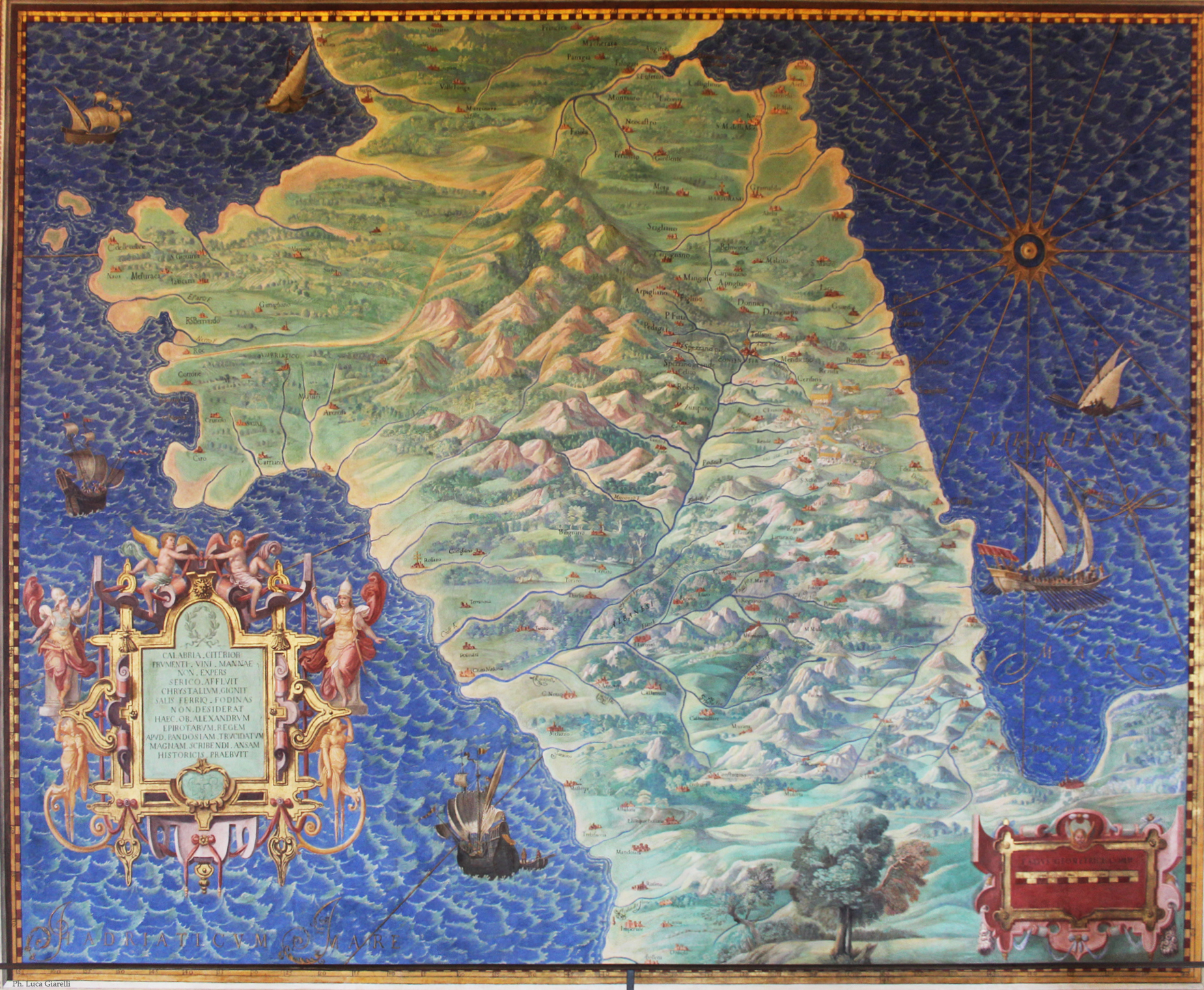
Map of Calabria

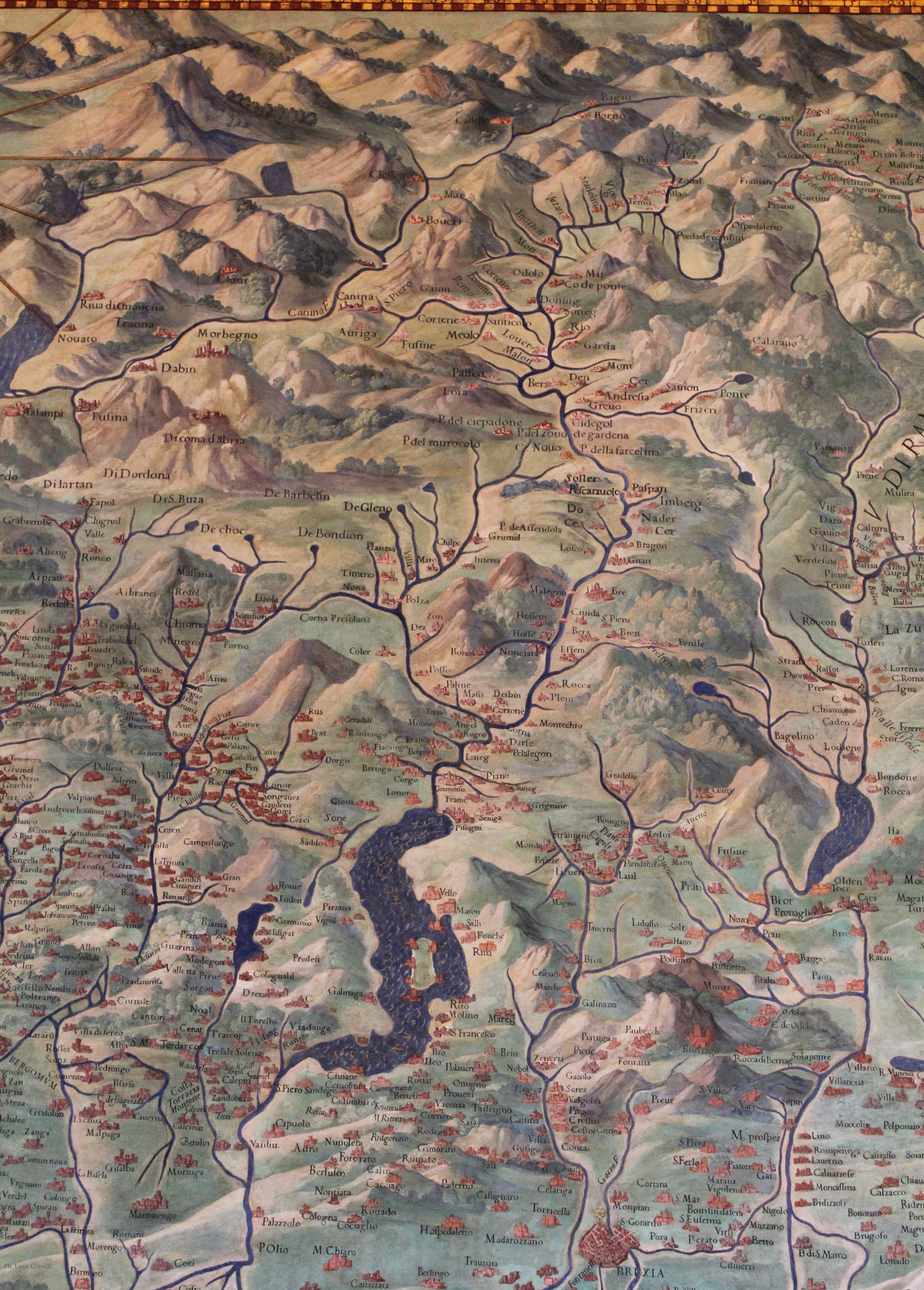
Map of Val Camonica

The panels map the entirety of the Italian peninsula in large-scale frescoes, each depicting a region as well as a perspective view of its most prominent city. It is said that these maps are approximately 80% accurate.

With the Apennines as a partition, one side depicts the regions surrounded by the Ligurian and Tyrrhenian Seas and the other depicts the regions surrounded by the Adriatic Sea.

== Regional maps ==
If noted the map shows the Italian geographic region and not the current Italian state. Below is a list of the maps in the gallery.

Right wall (eastern regions)

- Two maps of Apulia:
  - Salentina Hydrunti terra, that is, southern Apulia, including the Salento peninsula,
  - Apulia, that is, the Tavoliere and Gargano regions;
- one map of Abruzzo:
  - Aprutium, with a representation of the city of L'Aquila;
- three maps of Marche:
  - Ager anconitanus, that is, the territory of Ancona, with the map of Loreto (the representation of Ancona appears among the views of the main port cities of the 16th century),
  - Picenum, that is, the Marches south of Fano, with a representation of the city of Macerata,
  - Urbini ducatus, that is, the Duchy of Urbino, with maps of Urbino and Pesaro.
- four maps of Emilia-Romagna:
  - Flaminia, i.e., Romagna, with the map of Rimini;
  - Bononiensis ditio, i.e., the territory of Bologna, with the map of Bologna;
  - Ferrariae ducatus, i.e., the Duchy of Ferrara, with the map of Ferrara;
  - Placentiae et Parmae ducatus, i.e., the Duchy of Parma and Piacenza, with the maps of Parma and Piacenza;
- two maps of Veneto, Trentino-Alto Adige, and Friuli-Venezia Giulia:
  - Forum Iulii, that is, the Venetian coast, Friuli, Venezia Giulia, and part of Trentino-Alto Adige (the representation of Venice is among the views of the main port cities of the 16th century);
  - Transpadana Venetorum ditio, that is, western Veneto, with maps of Vicenza and Padua;
- two maps of Lombardy:
  - Mantuae ducatus, that is, the Duchy of Mantua, with a map of Mantua;
  - Mediolanensis ducatus, that is, the Duchy of Milan, with a map of Milan;
- a map of Piedmont and the Aosta Valley:
  - Pedemontium et Monsferratus, with a plan of Turin.

Left wall (western regions)

- A map of Liguria:
  - Liguria (the representation of Genoa is among the views of the main port cities of the 16th century);
- a map of Tuscany:
  - Etruria, with maps of Florence, Livorno, and Siena;
- two maps of Umbria:
  - Perusinus ac Tifernas, i.e., the territory of Perugia and Città di Castello, with a map of Perugia,
  - Umbria, i.e., southern Umbria, with a map of Spoleto;
- two maps of Latium:
  - Latium et Sabina, i.e., the Roman Campagna and the Sabina, with a map of Rome,
  - Patrimonium Sancti Petri, i.e., northern Latium, with maps of Viterbo and Orvieto;
- two maps of Campania:
  - Campania, meaning Northern Campania, with a plan of Naples,
  - Principatus Salerni, meaning the Principality of Salerno;
- one map of Basilicata:
  - Lucania;
- two maps of Calabria:
  - Calabria citerior, meaning northern Calabria,
  - Calabria ulterior, meaning southern Calabria;
- one map of Sicily:
  - Sicilia, with plans of Palermo, Syracuse and Messina;
- one map of Sardinia:
  - Sardinia;
- one map of Corsica:
  - Corsica;

one map of the territory of Avignon and the Comtat Venaissin:

  - Avenionensis ditio et Venaisinus comitatus.

After the series of regional maps, there are two general geographical maps:

- Ancient Italy (with the inscription Italia antiqua - Commendatur Italia locorum salubritate, coeli temperie, soli ubertate)
- Modern Italy (with the inscription Italia nova - Italia artium studiorumque plena semper est habita).

== View of the main Italian ports ==
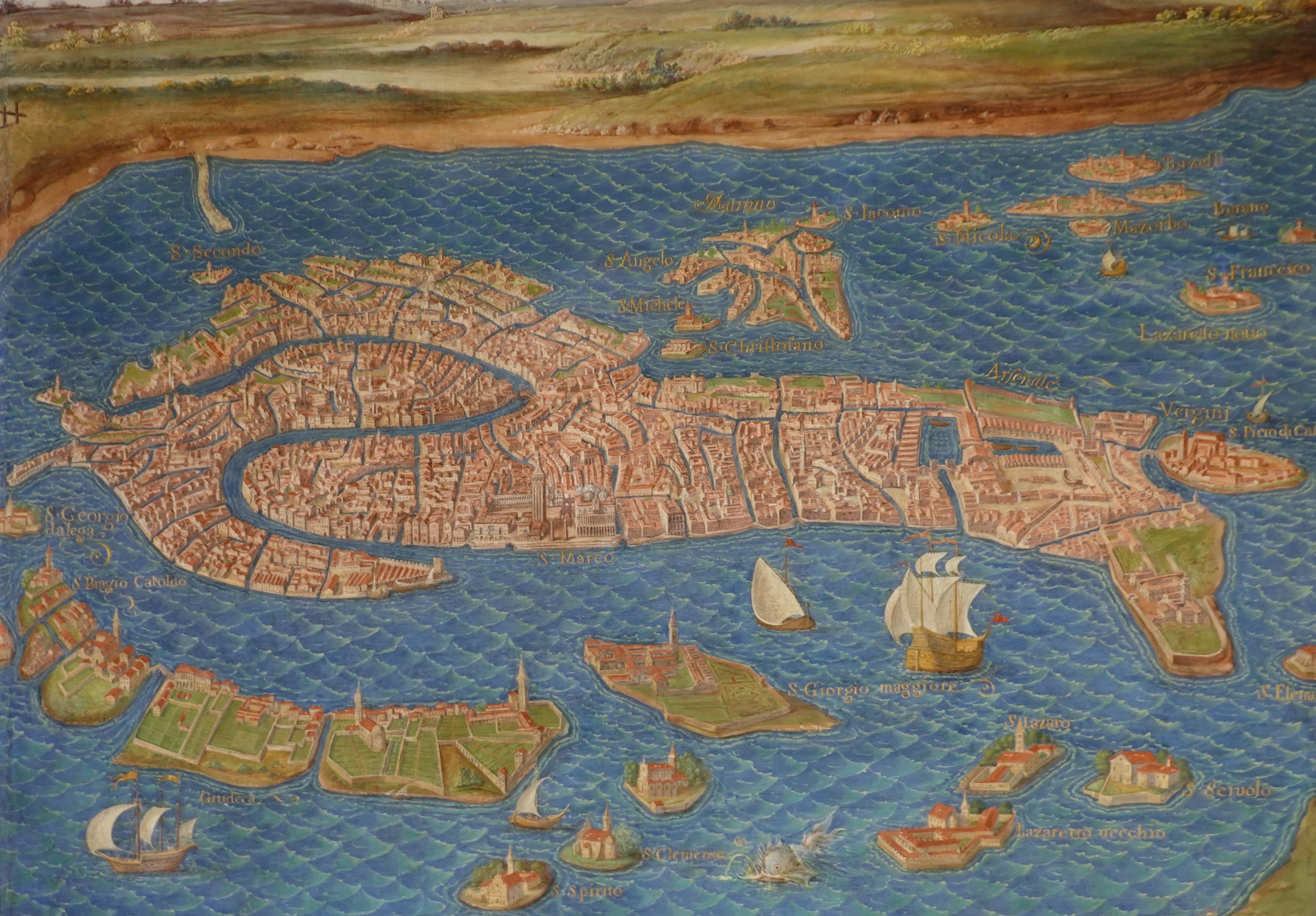
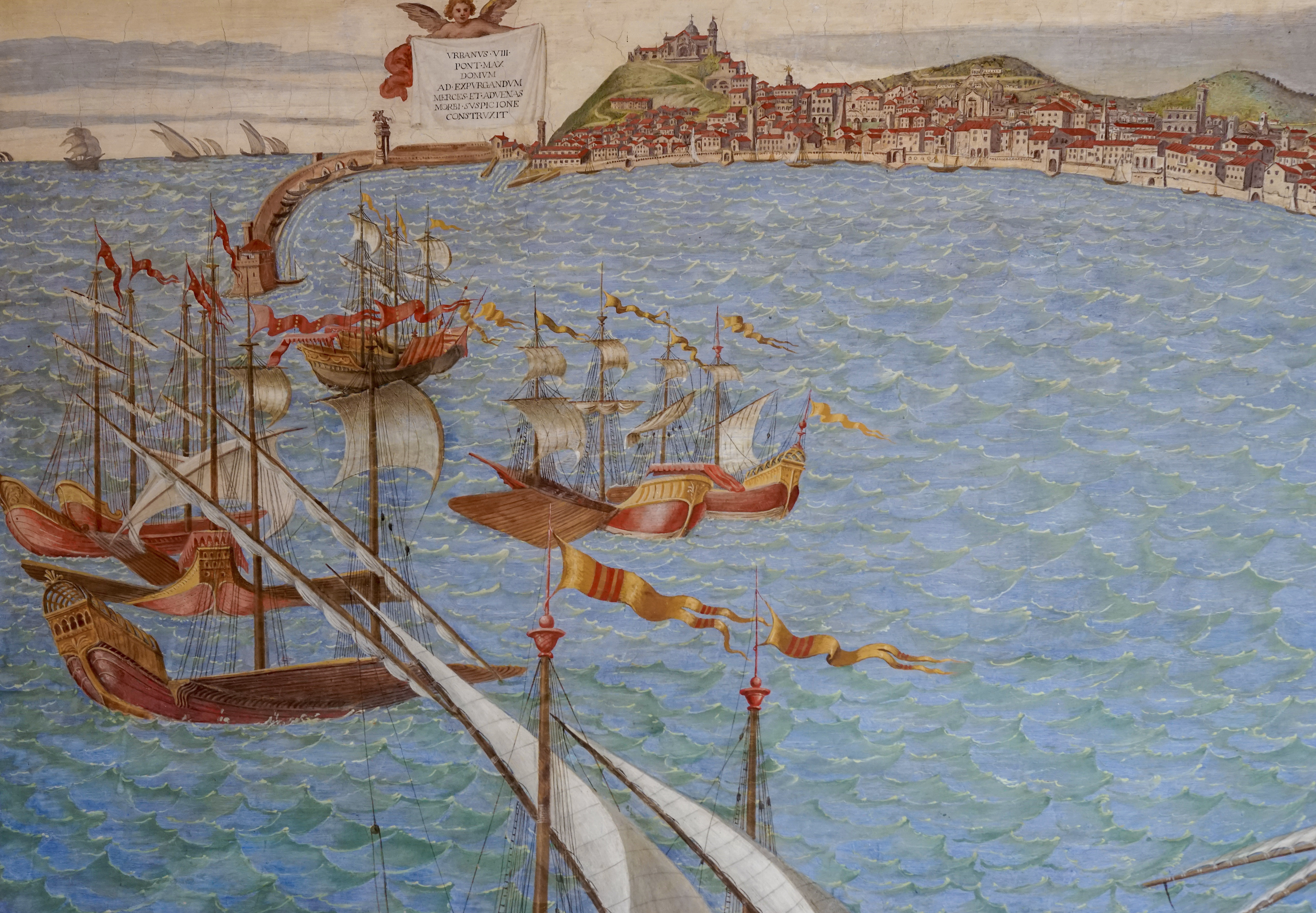
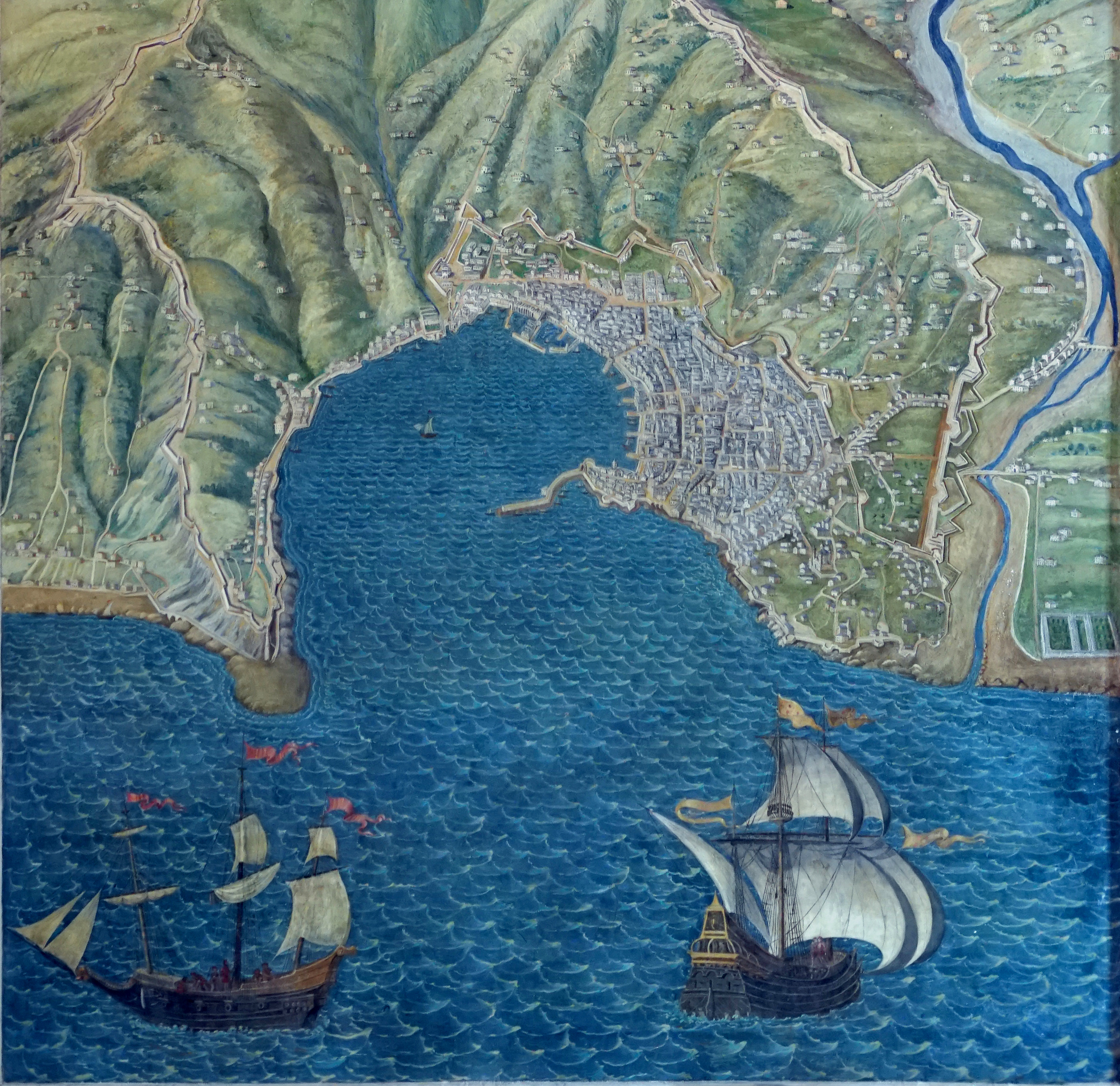
Main Italian ports of the 16th century: Venice, Ancona, and Genoa (Civitavecchia is not shown)

Perspective views of major 16th-century Italian ports are grouped at one end of the gallery. They possess significant artistic value and even offer glimpses into the lives of these cities during the Renaissance.

- Venice, Adriatic port city and capital of the maritime republic of the same name (Republic of Venice);
- Ancona, principal Adriatic port of the Papal States and former maritime republic (Republic of Ancona);
- Genoa, Tyrrhenian port city and capital of the maritime republic of the same name (Republic of Genoa);
- Civitavecchia, principal Tyrrhenian port of the Papal States.

== Smaller islands ==
At the other end, you will find maps of the Tremiti Islands, the island of Elba (with the map of Portoferraio), Corfu and Malta (with the map of Valletta).

== Other decorations ==
The decorations on the vaulted ceiling are the work of a group of Mannerist artists including Cesare Nebbia and Girolamo Muziano.

The gallery once displayed the so-called Azuchi Screens, who were gifted by the Japanese shogun Oda Nobunaga to Pope Gregory XIII in 1585.

== Gallery ==
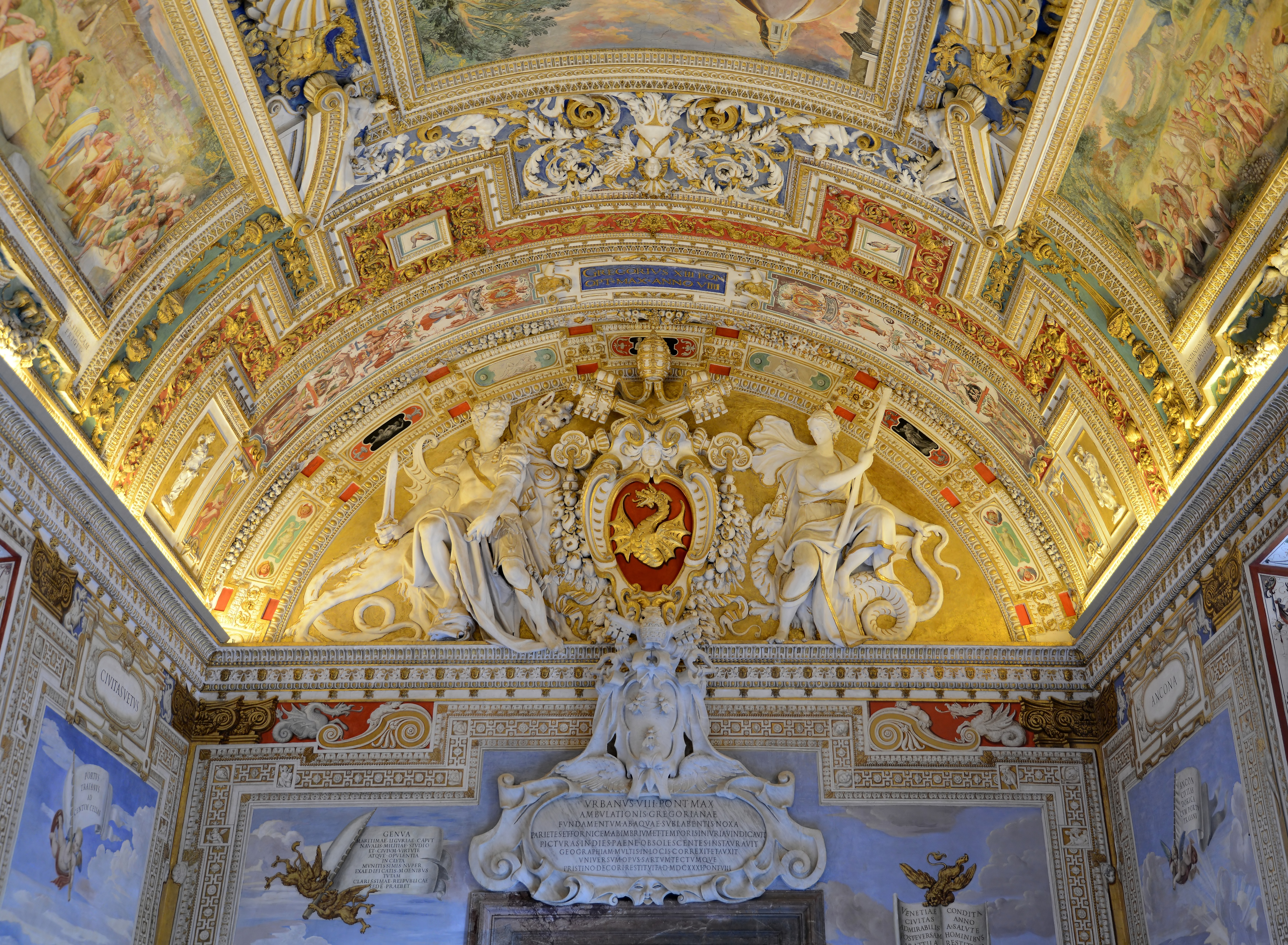
Coat of arms of Pope Gregory XIII and Pope Urban VIII

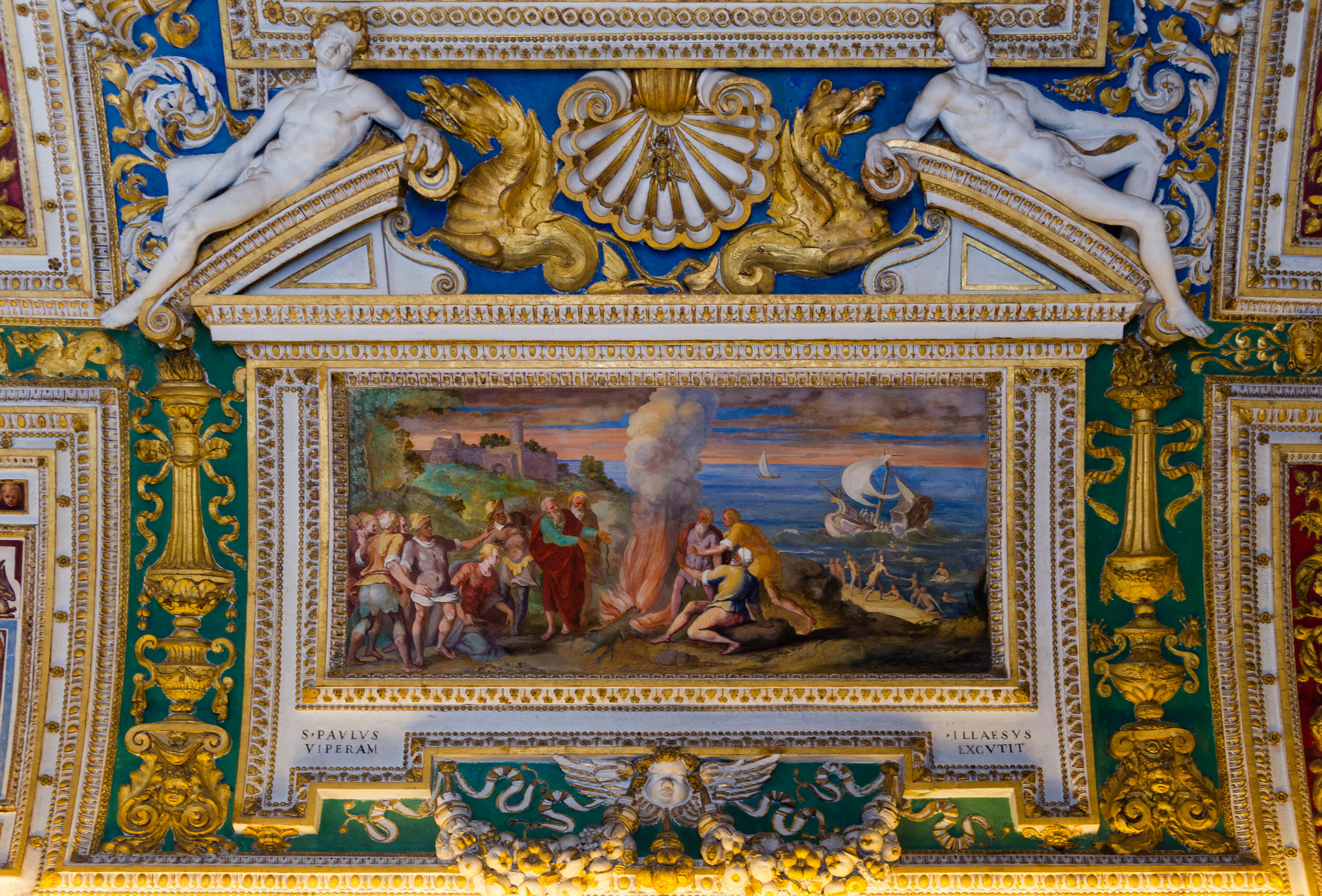
Saint Paul being bitten by a viper

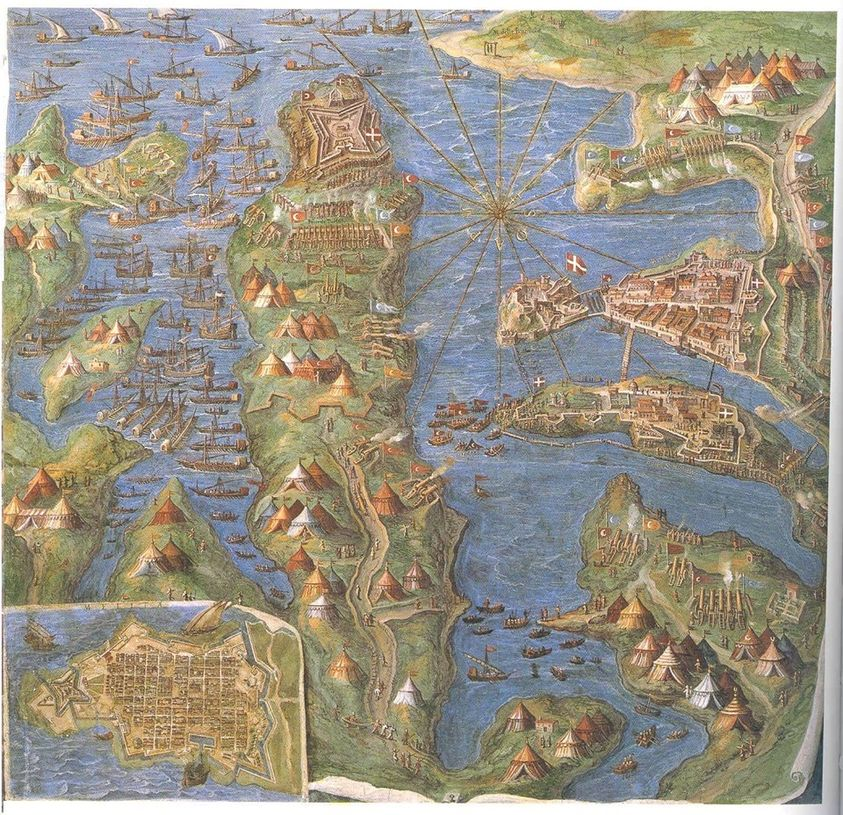
Siege of Malta

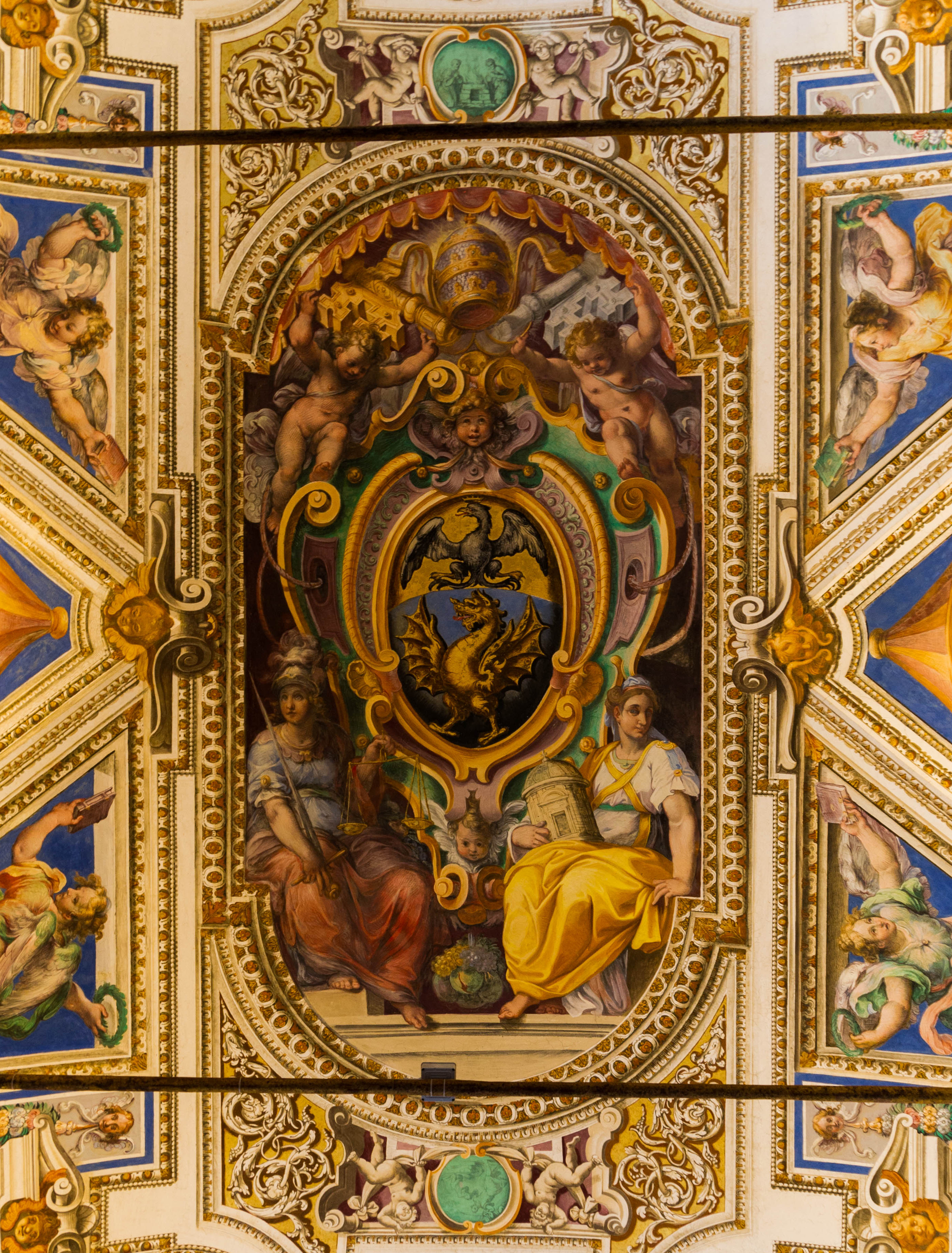
Coat of Arms of Pope Paul V

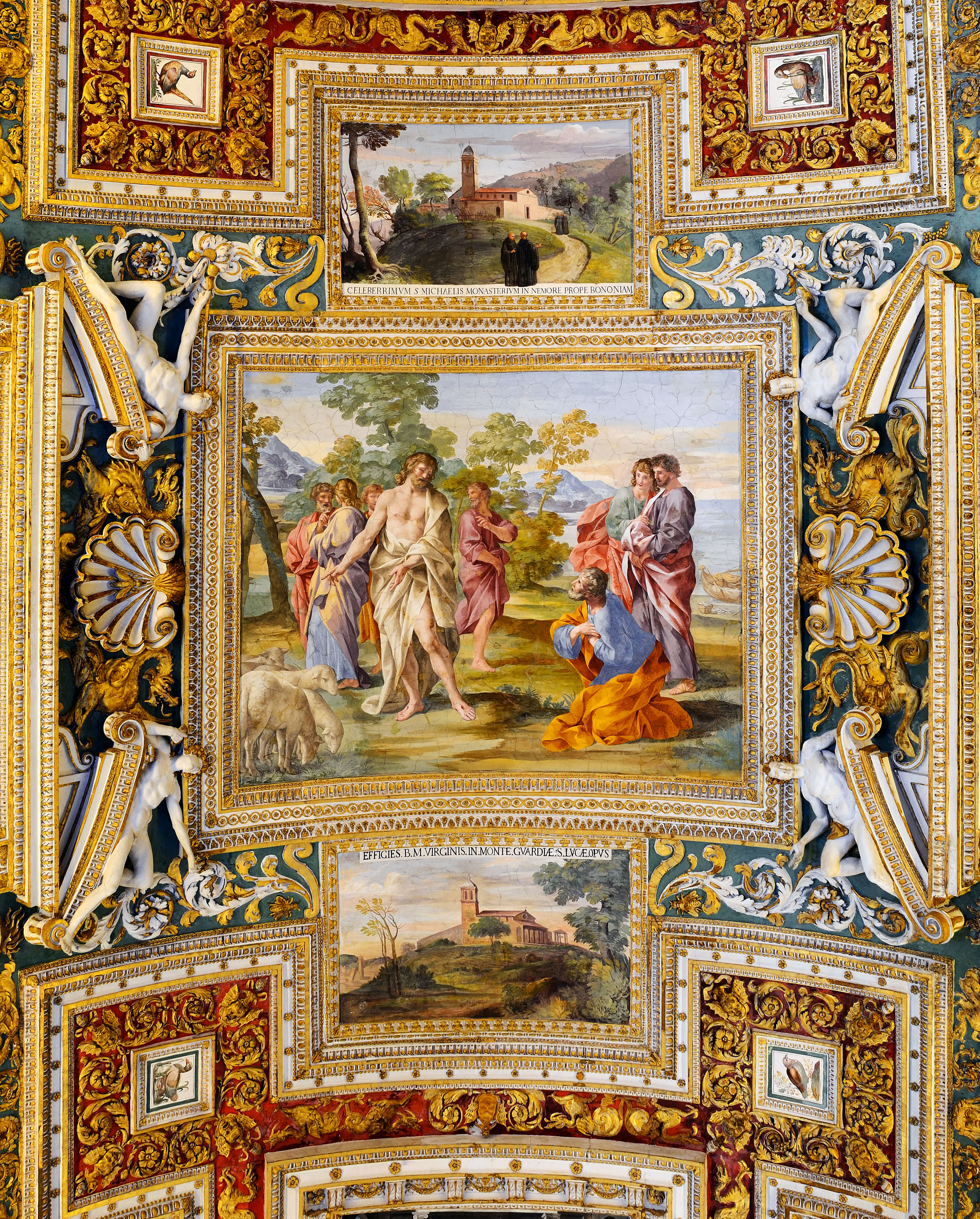
Painting of Jesus and Lazarus

== See also ==
- Vatican Museums
- Vatican City
- Index of Vatican City-related articles
