= Alessandro Vittrici =

Italian art collector

Most Reverend Alessandro Vittrici
- Bishop Emeritus of Alatri
- Church: Catholic Church
- Diocese: Diocese of Alatri
- In office: 1632–1648
- Predecessor: Francesco Campanari
- Successor: Michelangelo Brancavalerio

Orders
- Consecration: 24 October 1632 by Laudivio Zacchia

Personal details
- Died: 5 October 1650 Alatri, Italy

Alessandro Vittrici (or Vittrice; died 5 October 1650) was a Roman art collector and Catholic prelate who served as Bishop of Alatri (1632–1648) and as governor of Rome from 1647.

== Biography ==
Alessandro was the son of Gerolamo Vittrici (died March 1612), sottoguardaroba to every pope since Gregory XIII. Gerolamo commissioned the Deposition of Christ from Caravaggio for his uncle's chapel (the Capella della Pietà) in Santa Maria in Vallicella (the Chiesa Nuova), a church built for the Oratory of Saint Philip Neri.

Vittrice is also known to have been, in 1620, the owner of Caravaggio's The Fortune Teller, which he gifted to Pope Innocent X.

On 20 September 1632, Alessandro Vittrici was appointed during the papacy of Pope Urban VIII as Bishop of Alatri. On 24 October 1632, he was consecrated bishop by Laudivio Zacchia, Cardinal-Priest of San Pietro in Vincoli. He served as Bishop of Alatri until his resignation in 1648. He died on 5 October 1650.

== Episcopal succession ==
While bishop, he was the principal co-consecrator:

- Alessandro Tassi, Bishop of Terracina, Priverno e Sezze (1646);
- Marco Romano (bishop), Bishop of Ruvo (1646);
- Francesco Antonio Depace, Bishop of Aquino (1646);
- Taddeo Altini, Titular Bishop of Porphyreon (1646);
- Federico Sforza, Bishop of Rimini (1646);
- Ignazio Ciantes, Bishop of Sant'Angelo dei Lombardi e Bisaccia (1647);
- César Argelli (de Paltronibus), Archbishop of Avignon (1647);
- Raphael Levacovich, Archbishop of Achrida (1647);
- Simeone de Summis, Bishop of Sapë (1647);
- Tommaso Imperato, Bishop of Vico Equense (1647);
- Giovanni Ambrogio Bicuti, Bishop of Acqui (1647); and
- Pompeo Mignucci, Archbishop of Dubrovnik (1647).

== External links and additional sources ==
- Cheney, David M. "Diocese of Alatri". Catholic-Hierarchy.org. (for Chronology of Bishops) ^{[self-published]}
- Chow, Gabriel. "Diocese of Alatri (Italy)". GCatholic.org. (for Chronology of Bishops) ^{[self-published]}

Catholic Church titles
Preceded by Francesco Campanari	Bishop of Alatri; 1632–1648	Succeeded by Michelangelo Brancavalerio
