= Ludovico Simonetta =

17th-century Italian bishop and cardinal

- Bishop of Pesaro
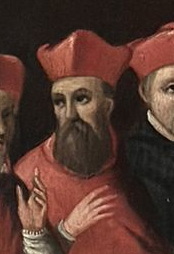
- Church: Catholic Church
- Diocese: Diocese of Pesaro
- In office: 1537–1561
- Predecessor: Cardinal Giacomo Simonetta
- Successor: Giulio Simonetta

Orders
- Ordination: 22 September 1538

Personal details
- Born: c. 1500 Milan, Duchy of Milan
- Died: 30 April 1568 (aged 68) Roma, Papal States
- Buried: Santa Maria degli Angeli

Ludovico Simonetta (or Simoneta, c.1500–1568) was an Italian Roman Catholic bishop and cardinal.

== Biography ==
Ludovico Simonetta was born in Milan ca. 1500, the son of Palatine Count Alessandro Simonetta and Antonia Castiglioni. He was the nephew of Cardinal Giacomo Simonetta.

He studied at Milan, becoming a doctor of both laws. He was admitted to the Collegio degli Avvocati of Milan in 1533, and practiced law in Milan and Pavia.

On 19 December 1537, following the resignation of his uncle Giacomo, Ludovico Simonetta was elected Bishop of Pesaro. He subsequently participated in the Council of Trent 1545-47.

In 1549, he moved to Rome, becoming a lawyer of the Apostolic Signatura. On 17 May 1560 he was appointed a datary.

Pope Pius IV made him a cardinal priest in the consistory of 26 February 1561. He received the red hat and the titular church of San Ciriaco alle Terme Diocleziane on 10 March 1561. He resigned the government of the Diocese of Pesaro sometime before 9 May 1561. On 10 November 1561 the pope named him papal legate to the Council of Trent. He became prefect of the Apostolic Signatura on 8 June 1563.

He was a participant in the papal conclave of 1565-66 that elected Pope Pius V. He opted for the titular church of Sant'Anastasia on 15 November 1566.

He died in Rome on 30 April 1568. He was buried in Santa Maria degli Angeli e dei Martiri.
