= Giovanni de Rosso =

Most Reverend Giovanni de Rosso
- Bishop of Alatri
- Church: Catholic Church
- Diocese: Diocese of Alatri
- In office: 1478–1493
- Successor: Jacobelli Silvestri

Personal details
- Died: 1493 Alatri, Italy

Giovanni de Rosso (died 1493) was a Roman Catholic prelate who served as Bishop of Alatri (1478–1493).

== Biography ==
On 14 Jan 1478, Giovanni de Rosso was appointed during the papacy of Pope Sixtus IV as Bishop of Alatri. He served as Bishop of Alatri until his death in 1493. While bishop, he was the principal consecrator of Martin Johann Lintfari, Bishop of Žemaičiai (1492) .

== External links and additional sources ==
- Cheney, David M. "Diocese of Alatri". Catholic-Hierarchy.org. (for Chronology of Bishops) ^{[self-published]}
- Chow, Gabriel. "Diocese of Alatri (Italy)". GCatholic.org. (for Chronology of Bishops) ^{[self-published]}

Catholic Church titles
Preceded by	Bishop of Alatri; 1478–1493	Succeeded by Jacobelli Silvestri
