= Ignazio Danti =

Italian Roman Catholic prelate, mathematician and astronomer (1536–1586)

Most Reverend Ignazio Danti
- Bishop of Alatri
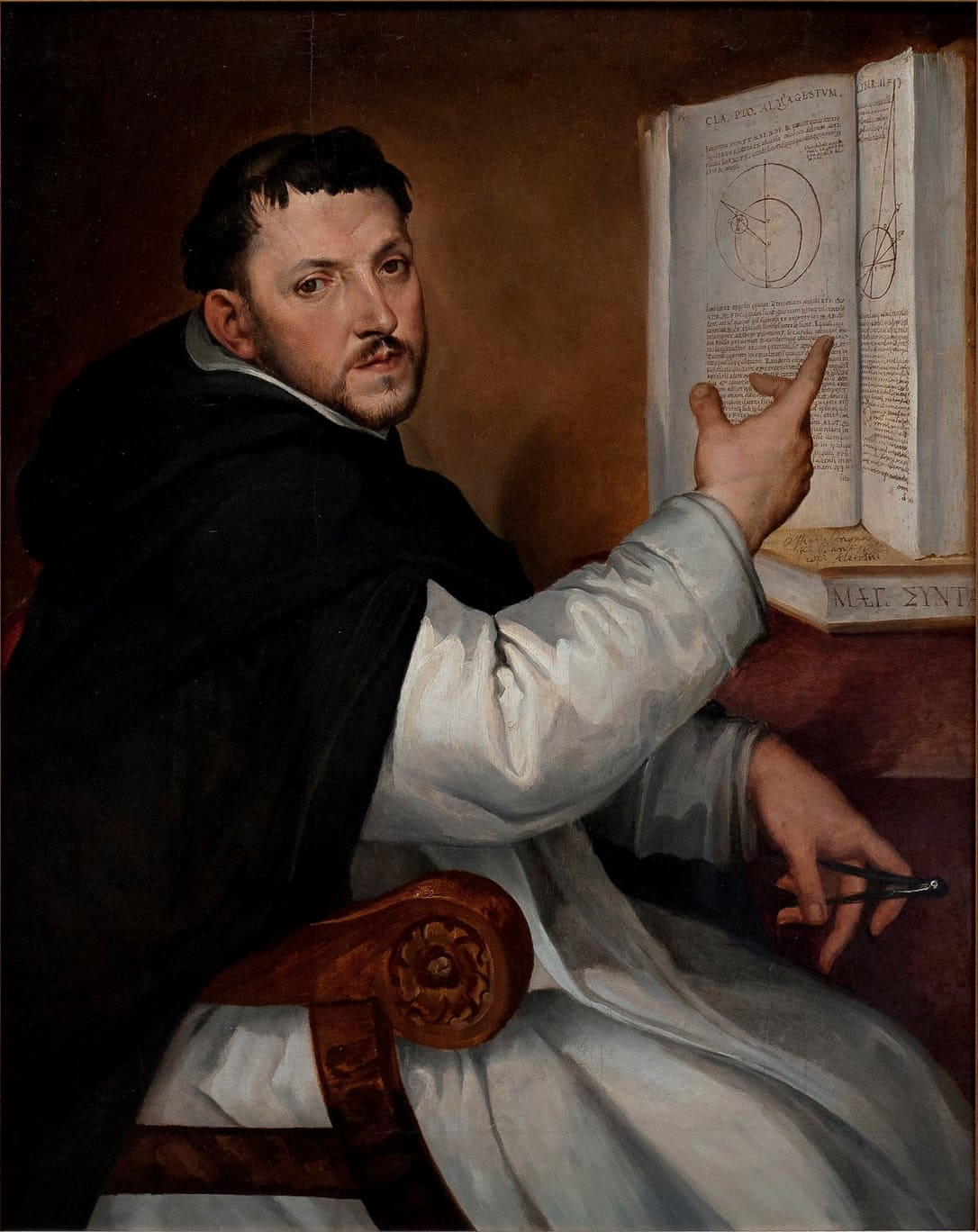
- Ignazio Danti
- Church: Catholic Church
- Diocese: Diocese of Alatri
- In office: 1583–1586
- Predecessor: Stefano Bonucci
- Successor: Bonaventura Furlani

Orders
- Consecration: 30 November 1583 by Giovanni Antonio Facchinetti de Nuce

Personal details
- Born: April 1536 Perugia, Papal States
- Died: 10 October 1586 (age 50) Alatri, Papal States

Ignazio (or Egnazio) Danti, O.P. (April 1536 – 10 October 1586), born Pellegrino Rainaldi Danti, was an Italian Roman Catholic prelate, mathematician, astronomer, and cosmographer, who served as Bishop of Alatri (1583–1586).

== Early life ==
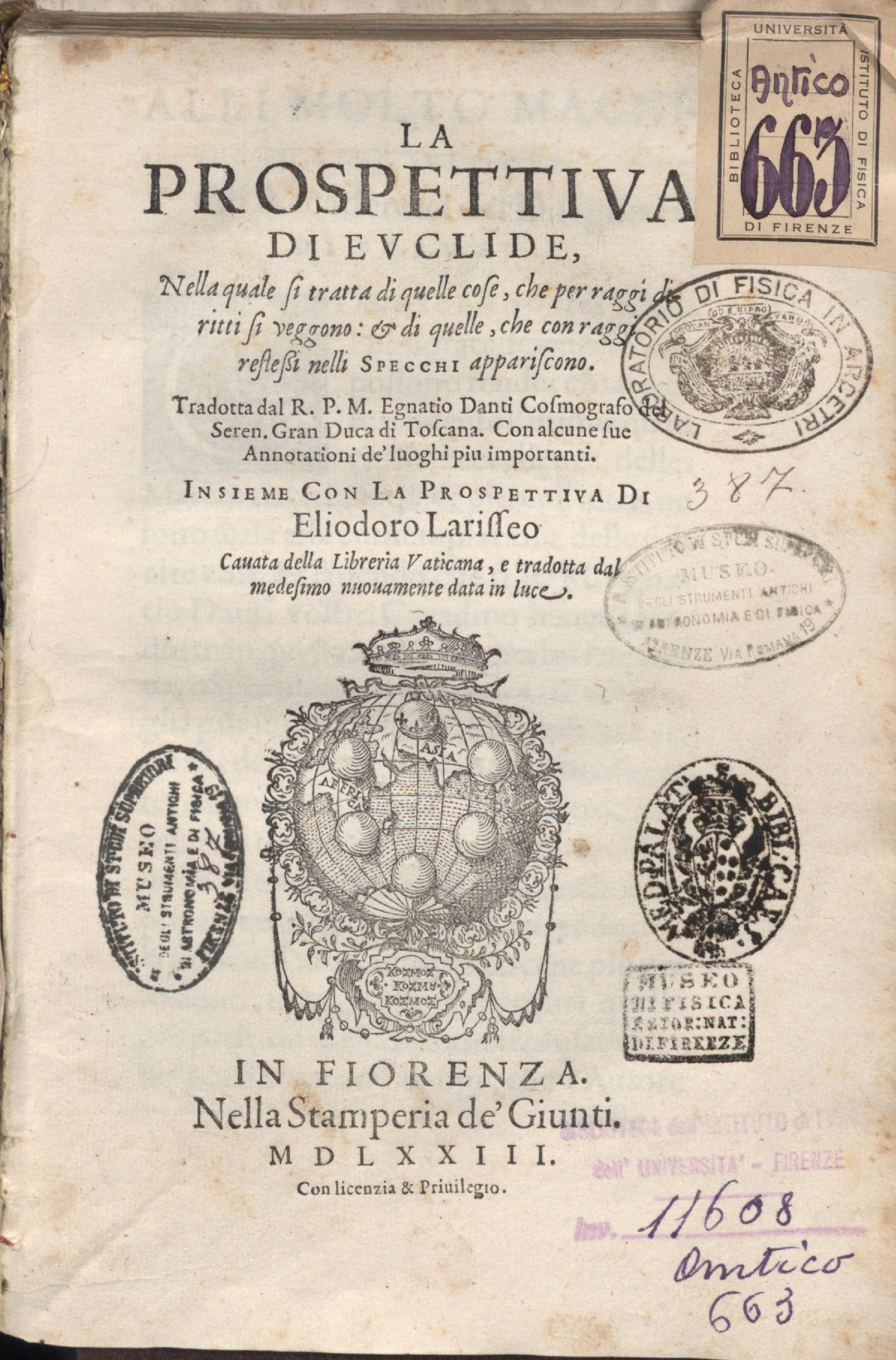
Euclid's Optica, translated by Danti

Danti was born in Perugia in 1536 to a family of artists and scientists. As a boy he learned the rudiments of painting and architecture from his father Giulio, an architect and engineer who studied under Antonio da Sangallo, and his aunt Teodora, who was said to have studied under the painter Perugino and also wrote a commentary on Euclid. His older brother Vincenzo Danti became one of the leading court sculptors of late-sixteenth-century Florence, while his younger brother Girolamo Danti (1547–1580) became a local painter.

Danti entered the Dominican Order on 7 March 1555, changing his baptismal name from Pellegrino to Ignazio. After completing his studies in philosophy and theology he spent some time preaching but soon devoted himself zealously to mathematics, astronomy, and geography.

== In Florence ==
In 1562, he requested a transfer from the Dominican compound in Perugia to the monastery of San Marco in Florence. Soon after, he found work on the side tutoring the children of wealthy Florentines in mathematics and science. In September 1563, he was invited by Cosimo I, Duke of Tuscany to participate in his cosmographical project, the Guardaroba in the Palazzo Vecchio. Over the next dozen years, Danti painted 30 maps of regions of the world (based largely upon published prints by Giacomo Gastaldi, Abraham Ortelius, Gerardus Mercator, and others) upon the cabinet doors of the Guardaroba. He also worked on many other significant scientific and cosmographic projects in Florence, including the large terrestrial globe of the Guardaroba (1564–1568), and a number of brass scientific instruments (such as an astrolabe) today in the Museo Galileo in Florence. Between 1567 and 1569, Pius V, who belonged to the Dominicans, is said to have commissioned Danti to furnish plans for the construction of a Dominican church and convent at Bosco Marengo in Piedmont; Danti acted mainly as an adviser. During his stay in Florence, Danti taught mathematics and published a number of scientific treatises, mostly commentaries on ancient and medieval astronomy and mathematics or explanations of how to use scientific instruments.

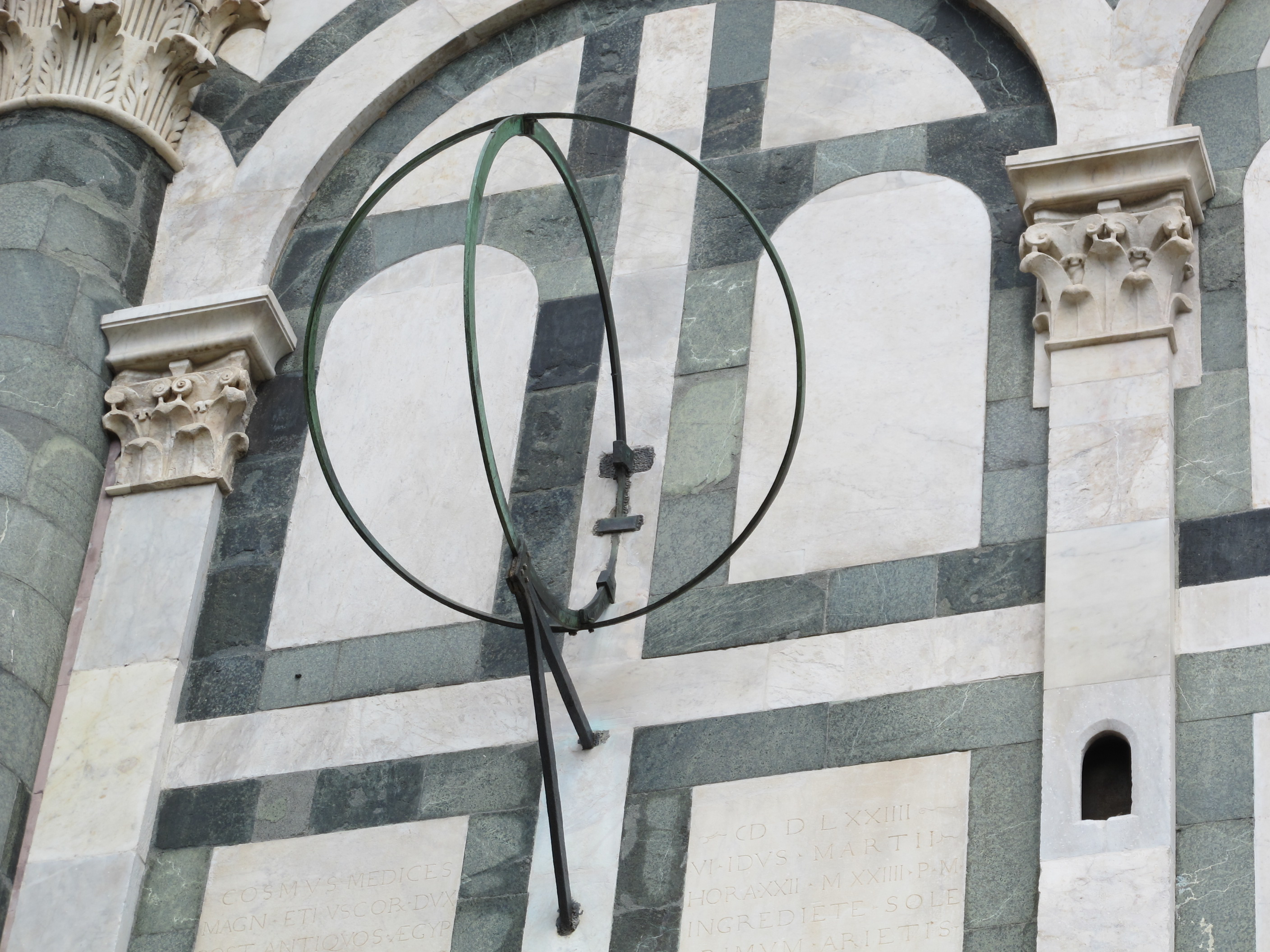
armillary sphere, Santa Maria Novella

For much of his time in Florence, Danti resided at the convent of Santa Maria Novella, and designed the quadrant and the armillary sphere that appear on the end blind arches of the lower facade of the church in 1572 and 1574, on the right and left respectively. He also designed a large-scale gnomon for the church which allowed a thin beam of light to enter the church at noon each day through a hole just beneath the facade's rose window, although it probably was not completed by the time Danti left Florence.

In 1574, Danti used his instruments to calculate the time of the March equinox, an important date for calculating the date of Easter. He discovered that it was 11 days out, falling on the 11 March rather than the 22 March, and he became a leading figure in proposing the reforms that lead to the adoption of the Gregorian calendar in 1582.

There were also discussions between the Duke and Danti about building a canal to place Florence in communication with both the Mediterranean and the Adriatic. However, this ambitious plan was not started before Cosimo's death in 1574. In late September the following year, Cosimo's son, Grand Duke Francesco de' Medici, compelled Danti to leave Florence. It is not known precisely why Francesco exiled Danti, but the Dominican had no trouble finding work or patrons anywhere else in Italy, although he never returned to Florence.

== Later life and bishopric ==
After leaving Florence, Danti became a professor of mathematics at the University of Bologna. He also spent some time in Perugia, at the invitation of the governor, where he prepared maps of the Perugian republic.

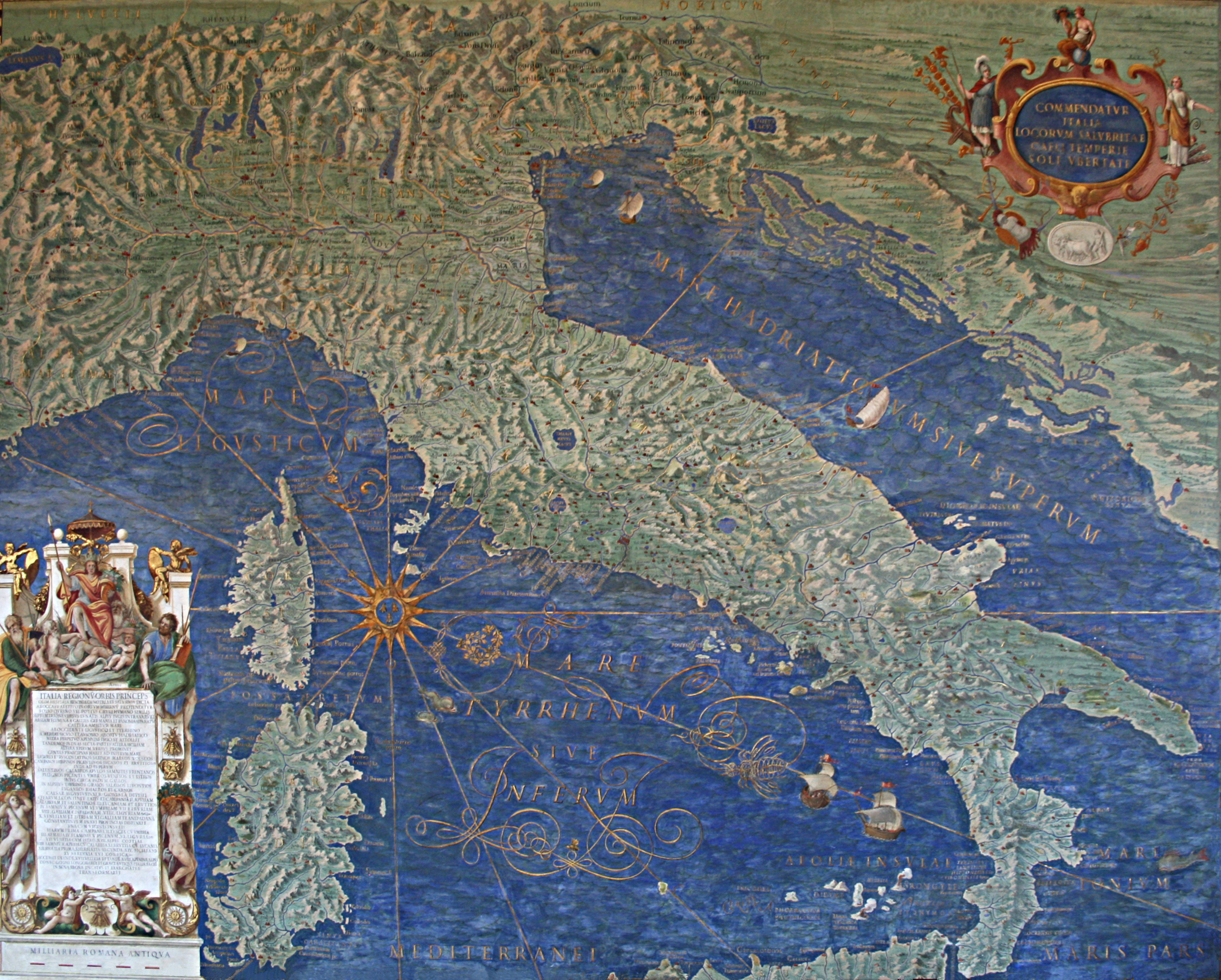
Map of Italy, Corsica and Sardinia - Gallery of Maps - Vatican Museums

On account of his mathematical skills, Pope Gregory XIII invited him to Rome, appointed him pontifical mathematician and made him a member of the commission for the reform of the calendar. He also placed him in charge of the painters whom the Pope had summoned to the Vatican to continue the decoration of the palace, most notably to make a number of maps of the regions of modern Italy in the newly constructed Gallery of Maps along the Cortile del Belvedere. This project, begun in early 1580 and completed about 18 months later, mapped the entirety of the Italian peninsula in 40 large-scale frescoes, each depicting a region as well as a perspective view of its most prominent city.

When the pontiff commissioned the architect Domenico Fontana to repair the Claudian harbour at Portus, it was Danti who furnished the necessary plans. While at Rome Danti published a translation of a portion of Euclid with annotations and wrote a life of the architect Jacopo Barozzi da Vignola, preparing also notes for the latter's work on perspective. In 1583, in recognition of his work, Gregory made him Bishop of Alatri in the Campagna. He was appointed on 14 November 1583, and consecrated as bishop on 30 November 1583 by Giovanni Antonio Facchinetti de Nuce, Patriarch of Jerusalem. with Giovanni Battista Santorio, Bishop of Alife, and Gerolamo Mazzarelli, Bishop of Nona, serving as co-consecrators.

Danti showed himself a zealous pastor in his new office. As Bishop of Alatri, Danti convoked a diocesan synod, corrected many abuses, and showed great solicitude for the poor. While bishop, he was the principal co-consecrator of Marco Pedacca, Bishop of Lacedonia (1584); and Basilio Gradi, Bishop of Stagno (1584). Shortly before his death Pope Sixtus V summoned him to Rome to assist in the erection of the grand Vatican obelisk in the piazza of the Vatican.

Besides the works already mentioned, Danti was the author of Trattato del'uso e della fabbrica dell'astrolabo con la giunta del planifero del Raja; Le Scienze matematiche ridotte in tavole, also a revised and annotated edition of La Sfera di Messer G. Sacrobosco tradotta da Pier Vincenzio Danti. The first mentioned work deals with the use and construction of the astrolabe and is one of the oldest instructions for scientific instruments. Danti wrote the first Italian treatise on this topic to accompany the book.

Danti died at Alatri on 10 October 1586, three years into his service.

== Works ==
- Dell'uso et della fabbrica dell'astrolabio (in Italian). Firenze: Giunta. 1578.
- Anemographia (in Latin). Bologna: Giovanni Rossi. 1578.

== See also ==
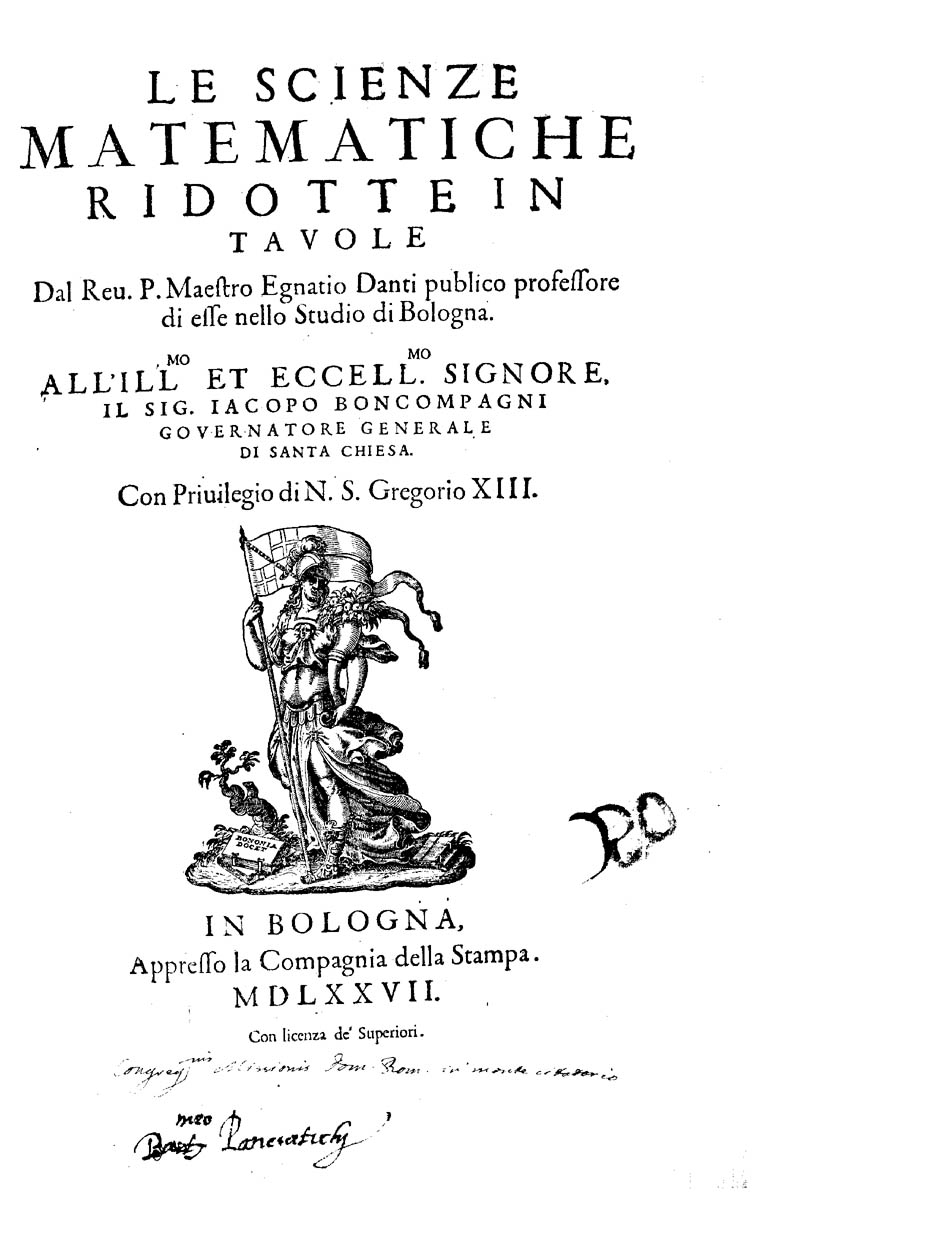
Scienze matematiche ridotte in tavole, 1577

- List of Roman Catholic scientist-clerics

== External links and additional sources ==
- Chow, Gabriel. "Diocese of Alatri (Italy)". GCatholic.org. (for Chronology of Bishops) ^{[self-published]}
- Egnatio Danti, Les deux règles de la perspective pratique de Vignole, 1583, Pascal Dubourg Glatigny, Paris, 2003, ISBN 2-271-06105-9.
- O'Connor, John J.; Robertson, Edmund F., "Ignazio Danti", MacTutor History of Mathematics Archive, University of St Andrews
- Mark Rosen, The Mapping of Power in Renaissance Italy (Cambridge: Cambridge University Press, 2015).
- Online Galleries, History of Science Collections, University of Oklahoma Libraries High resolution images of works by and/or portraits of Ignazio Danti in .jpg and .tiff format.

Catholic Church titles
Preceded by Stefano Bonucci	Bishop of Alatri; 1583–1586	Succeeded by Bonaventura Furlani
