= Diocese of Alatri =

The former Italian Catholic diocese of Alatri existed until 1986, when it was united into the diocese of Anagni-Alatri. Comprising historically seven towns close to Rome, it was under the immediate jurisdiction of the Holy See.

== History ==
Local legends place the conversion of Ferentino, Alatri, and neighboring towns in the apostolic age. A named bishop of Alatri is Paschasius (551), who accompanied Pope Vigilius to Constantinople on the occasion of the controversy of the Three Chapters.

In the church of St. Mary Major in Alatri was preserved a wooden statue of the Madonna, an example of Roman art of the twelfth century.

== Ordinaries ==
=== Diocese of Alatri ===
Erected: 6th Century
Latin Name: Alatrinus
Immediately Subject to the Holy See

- Giovanni de Rosso (14 Jan 1478 - 1493 Died)
- Jacobelli Silvestri (15 Apr 1493 - 1516 Died)
- Graziano Santucci (11 Nov 1516 - 1517 Died)
- Cristoforo Numai (1517 - 23 Mar 1528 Died)

Administrator Filippo Ercolani (20 Apr 1528 - 1530 Resigned)

- Antonio Maria Ciocchi del Monte (4 Feb 1530 - 1 Jul 1530 Resigned)
- Filippo Ercolani (1 Jul 1530 - 1535 Resigned)
- Agostino Spínola (10 May 1535 - 18 Oct 1537 Died)
- Bernardino Visconti (Conti) (29 Oct 1537 - 1540 Died)
- Valerio Tartarini (Valeriano Tartarini) (20 Feb 1540 - 1545 Died)
- Zaccaria Rondani (Zaccaria Rondariis) (3 Jul 1545 - 1547 Died)
- Camillo Perusco (Camillo Peruschi) (22 Apr 1547 - 1572 Died)
- Stefano Bonucci (23 Jan 1573 - 1 Oct 1574 Appointed, Bishop of Arezzo)
- Ignazio Danti (14 Nov 1583 - 10 Oct 1586 Died)
- Bonaventura Furlani (5 Nov 1586 - Dec 1597 Died)
- Luca Antonio Gigli (Lilius) (Dec 1597 Succeeded - 1620 Died)
- Francesco Campanari (16 Nov 1620 - 1632 Died)
- Alessandro Vittrici (20 Sep 1632 - 1648 Resigned)
- Michelangelo Brancavalerio (4 May 1648 - 25 Mar 1683 Died)
- Stefano Ghirardelli (14 Jun 1683 - Feb 1708 Died)
- Ludovico Savageri (30 Mar 1729 Succeeded - 13 Jan 1744 Resigned)
- Giovanni Francesco Cavallini (16 Mar 1744 - 6 Feb 1764 Died)
- Nicola Gagliardi (11 May 1764 - 30 Jun 1777 Died)
- Pietro Stefano Speranza (28 Jul 1777 - 26 Jun 1802 Died)
- Giuseppe Della Casa (20 Sep 1802 - 31 Mar 1818 Died)
- Francesco-Saverio Domeniconi (25 May 1818 - 16 Feb 1835 Died)
- Valentino Armellini (6 Apr 1835 - 17 Dec 1841 Died)
- Adriano Giampedi (24 Jan 1842 - 11 Oct 1850 Died)
- Raffaele Bocci (17 Feb 1851 - 27 Jan 1855 Died)
- Gaetano Rodilossi (23 Mar 1855 - 16 Dec 1878 Died)
- Pietro Saulini (28 Feb 1879 - 26 May 1887 Died)
- Francesco Giordani (25 Nov 1887 - 13 Dec 1902 Died)
- Benedetto Spila (24 Apr 1903 - 29 Apr 1909 Resigned)
- Americo Bevilacqua (29 Apr 1909 - 22 Jan 1915 Resigned)
- Michele Izzi (1 Jul 1915 - 31 Dec 1917 Died)
- Antonio Torrini (23 Dec 1918 - 15 Jun 1928 Appointed, Archbishop of Lucca)
- Mario Toccabelli (16 Sep 1930 - 1 Apr 1935 Appointed, Archbishop of Siena)
- Edoardo Facchini (5 May 1935 - 21 Oct 1962 Died)
- Vittorio Ottaviani (19 Dec 1962 - 10 Nov 1973 Appointed, Bishop of Marsi)
- Umberto Florenzani (21 Dec 1973 - 30 Sep 1986 Appointed, Bishop of Anagni-Alatri)

30 September 1986 United with and suppressed to the Diocese of Anagni to form the Diocese of Anagni-Alatri
