= Bardhi =

Bardhi is a surname. Notable persons with that name include:

== Catholic clergy ==
- Tosol Bardhi (1490–1582), Albanian prelate of the Roman Catholic Church
- Nikollë Bardhi (1551–1617), Albanian prelate of the Roman Catholic Church
- Gjergj Bardhi (1575–1646), Albanian prelate of the Roman Catholic Church
- Frang Bardhi (1606–1643), Albanian bishop and author of the early eras of Albanian literature

== Others ==
- Mehdi Bardhi (1927–1994), Yugoslav linguist, author, and teacher of Kosovar-Albanian descent
- Reshat Bardhi (1935–2011), Albanian religious leader of an Islamic order
- Gazment Bardhi (1986), Albania's Minister of Justice in 2017
- Mikelanxhelo Bardhi (1995), Albanian football player
- Enis Bardhi (1995), Macedonian professional footballer
- Kejvi Bardhi (1996), Albanian former football player
- Jurgen Bardhi (1997), Albanian professional footballer
- Bardhi (1997), born as Bardhyl Idrizi, Macedonian-Albanian rapper
- Patrik Bardhi (1998), Albanian professional footballer
