= Sapa =

Sapa or Sapë may refer to:

== Places ==
- Sapa, Mississippi, a community in the United States
- Sa Pa, a district-level town in Lào Cai province, Northern Vietnam
  - Sa Pa (ward)
  - Sapa (Prague), a Vietnamese market in Prague named after the town
- Sapë, a town in Albania
- Roman Catholic Diocese of Sapë, one of six such diocese of Albania
- Namayan or Sapa, a former barangay state in the Philippines
- Sapa, Çorum

== Acronyms ==
- South African Press Association
- Synthetic Aperture Personality Assessment

== Other uses ==
- Sapa (sweetener), a reduction of must
- SAPA (football club), Helsinki, Finland
- Sapa Arena, Vetlanda, Sweden
- Sapa Group, a Norwegian-based aluminium company
- Sapa Inca, the title of the hereditary ruler of the Inca
- Sapa language, a Southwestern Tai language of Sa Pa, Lào Cai Province, northern Vietnam
- Sapa (slang), Nigerian slang term denoting poverty or a relative lack of wealth. A feeling of financial incapacity due to overspending

== See also ==
- Paha Sapa, the Black Hills, U.S.
- Sapa-Sapa, Tawi-Tawi, Philippines
- Sape (disambiguation)
- Sappa (disambiguation)
