= Simeone de Summis =

17th-century Albanian Roman Catholic Prelate

Most Reverend Simeone de Summis
- Bishop of Sapë
- Church: Catholic Church
- Diocese: Diocese of Sapë
- In office: 1647–1672
- Predecessor: Gjergj Bardhi (Giorgio Bianchi)
- Successor: Stefano de Gaspare

Orders
- Consecration: 2 June 1647 by Pier Luigi Carafa

Personal details
- Died: December 1672 Sapë, Albania

Simeone de Summis, O.F.M. or Simon Suma (died 1672) was an Albanian Roman Catholic prelate who served as Bishop of Sapë (1647–1672).

== Biography ==
Born in Krujë, Suma was ordained a priest in the Order of Friars Minor. On 27 May 1647, he was appointed during the papacy of Pope Innocent X as Bishop of Sapë. On 2 June 1647, he was consecrated bishop by Pier Luigi Carafa, Cardinal-Priest of Santi Silvestro e Martino ai Monti, with Ranuccio Scotti Douglas, Bishop of Borgo San Donnino, and Alessandro Vittrici, Bishop of Alatri, serving as co-consecrators. He served as Bishop of Sapë until his death in December 1672.

While bishop, he was the principal co-consecrator of Ivan Antun Zboronac, Bishop of Kotor (1656).

Catholic Church titles
Preceded by Gjergj Bardhi (Giorgio Bianchi)	Bishop of Sapë; 1647–1672	Succeeded by Stefano de Gaspare
