= Sappa =

Sappa may refer to:

- Manilkara excisa, also known as Sappa, a local name for a species of tree of Northern Jamaica
- Sapë, a town in Albania (sometimes transliterated as 'Sappa')
- Roman Catholic Diocese of Sapë, one of six such diocese of Albania (sometimes transliterated as 'Sappa')
- Sappa, Ethiopia, early capital city (1800–1825) of the former Ethiopian Kingdom of Limmu-Ennarea
- Sappa Township, Decatur County, Kansas
- Sappa Township, Harlan County, Nebraska
- Ṣ́appa, a letter, from the ancient Semitic language Ge'ez

== See also ==
- Sapa (disambiguation)
