= Dominic Thopia =

Albanian nobleman and bishop (died 1382)

Most Reverend Dominic Thopia Dominik Topia OP
- Bishop of Korčula & Ston; Archbishop of Zadar; Bishop of Bosnia
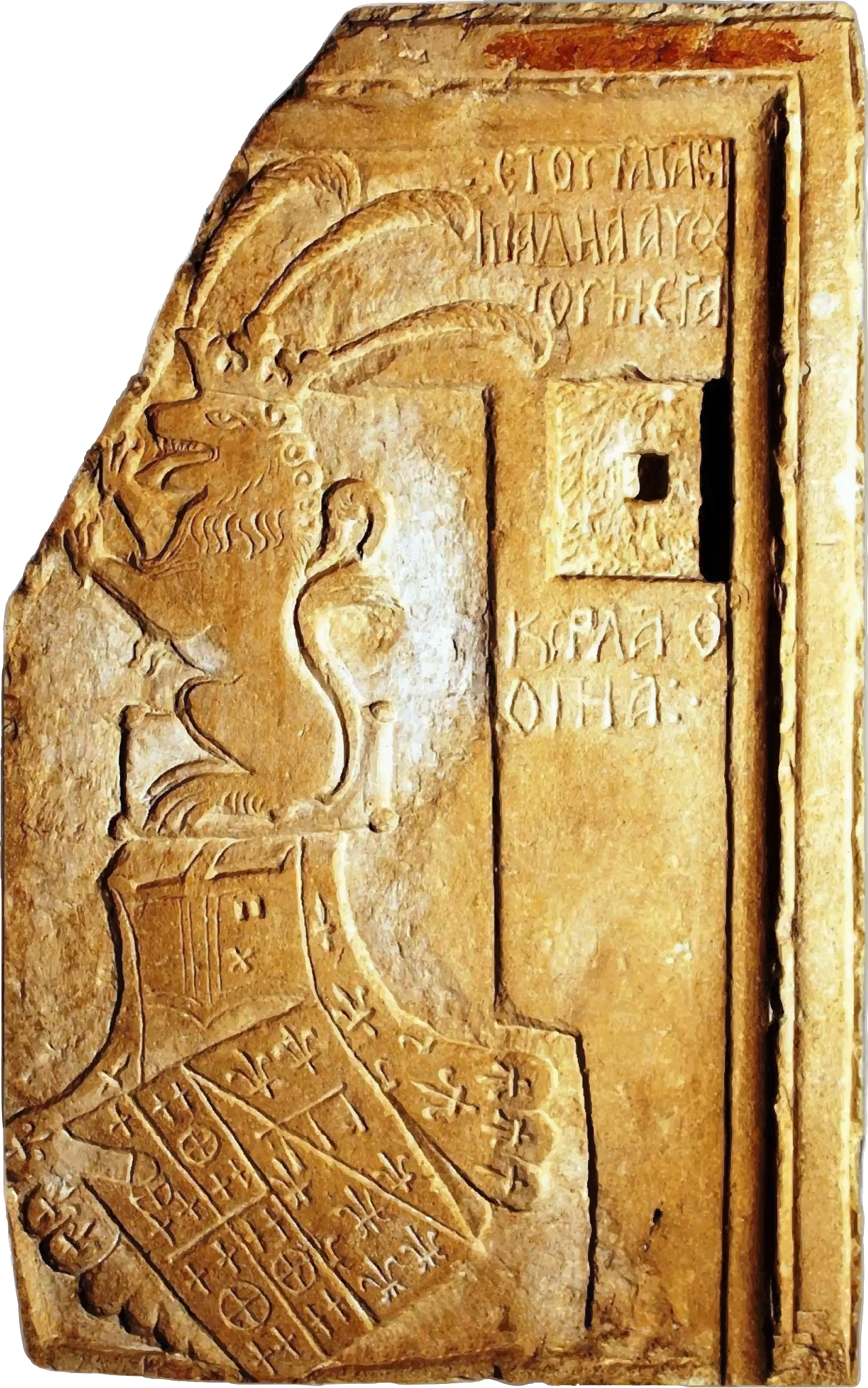
- Coat of Arms of the Thopia Family
- Native name: Dominik Topia
- Church: Catholic Church
- Archdiocese: Archdiocese of Zadar
- In office: Archbishop of Zadar (1368-1376)
- Predecessor: Giacomo de Candia
- Successor: Pietro Matafari
- Other posts: Bishop of Korčula & Ston (1350–1368); Bishop of Bosnia (1376-1382)

Personal details
- Born: c. 1300s Durrës, Kingdom of Albania
- Died: 1382 Đakovo, Kingdom of Hungary
- Denomination: Roman Catholic (Dominican Order)
- Parents: Tanusio Thopia (?); Unknown

Dominic Thopia OP (Albanian: Dominik Topia; c. 1300s – 1382), also known as Domenico or Domenic, was an Albanian nobleman and member of the Thopia family. He served as the court Chaplain and advisor of the King of Naples (1336) and became a Roman Catholic prelate, serving as the Bishop of Korčula and Bishop of Ston (1350–1368) and Archbishop of Zadar (1368–1376). He was then Bishop of Bosnia (1376–1382) until his death.

== Early life and education ==
Dominic was born into the Thopia family, an Albanian noble family, in the early 1300s in the Kingdom of Albania, in Durrës. The family had converted from Eastern Orthodoxy to Roman Catholicism. His father may have been Tanusio Thopia, while his mother is unknown. He was the uncle of Karl Thopia through his brother.

Dominic was educated in Italy where he dedicated himself to religious life, joining the Dominican Order, which had been active in Durrës since 1278. He enrolled in the order at a young age. The historian Carlo Bianchi wrote that Dominic's "learning" and "virtuous deeds" led to his initial elevation to the Bishopric of Korčula. His commitment to the order led him to become court chaplain and advisor to King Robert of Naples on June 12, 1336.

== Ecclesiastical career ==
From 1345 to 1351, Dominic served as the general vicar of the Dominican Order for Dalmatia and Durrës. During this time, he resided in Dubrovnik and focused on founding monasteries in Shkodër, Kotor, and Šibenik. The Order of Preachers (Dominican Order) established a significant presence in Shkodër, with a house founded by Dominic in 1345.

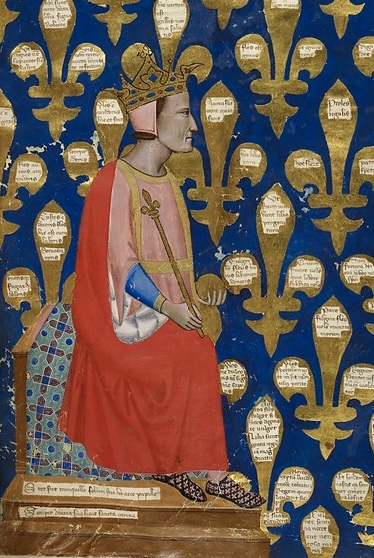
Robert, King of Naples

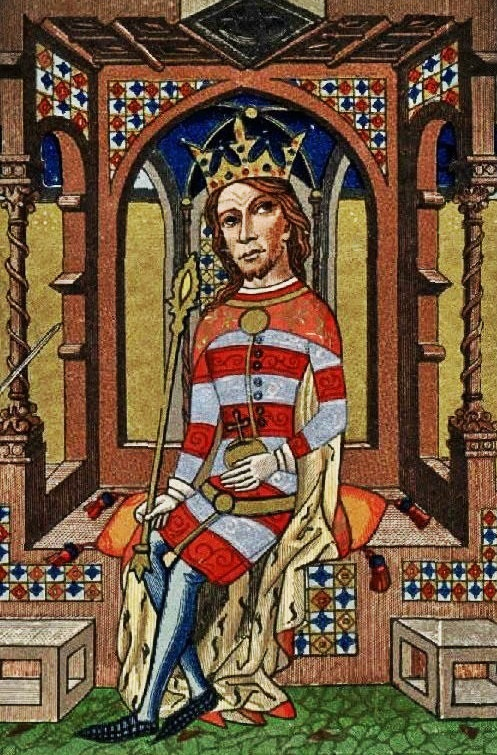
Louis I of Hungary

Dominic’s rise in the church was strongly supported by King Louis the Great of Hungary, who aimed to strengthen his influence in the Balkans and uphold Roman Catholic authority. As argued by Lala, Dominic, who was a member of the powerful Thopia family, played a crucial role in bridging the gap between the Hungarian crown and local Albanian rulers. With the king’s backing, he was appointed bishop of Ston and Korčula in 1350, a position he held for 17 years, during which he navigated both ecclesiastical and political affairs.

In 1359, Dominic was present in Albania, where he had spent considerable time. A Greek-language legal document pertaining to a vineyard lease by the Dominican monastery in Durrës names him as the responsible party. This period overlapped with the rise of Karl Thopia, following the death of Dominic's brother. According to Šufflay, it is likely that, during this time, Dominic worked closely with his nephew to establish a strong base of power in Dubrovnik.

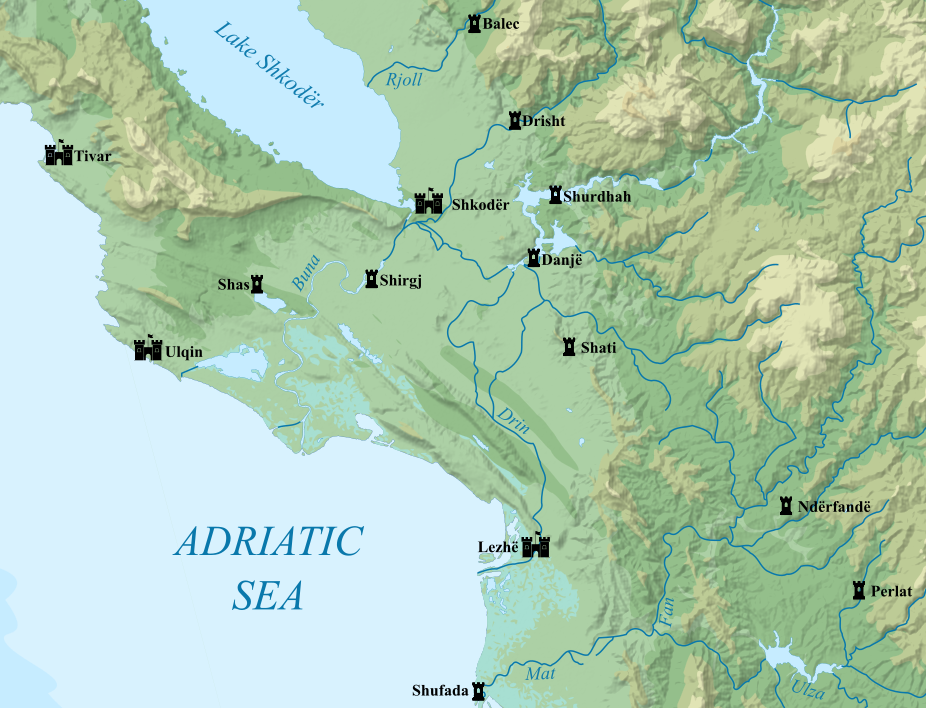
Map of Northern Albanian cities

In northern Albania at the same time, cities such as Drisht, Shas, Balec, and possibly Sapë were under the control of a bishop who held both religious and secular power. This example may have influenced Dominic's ambition to secure the vacant archbishopric in Dubrovnik in 1360. His primary ally in this effort was a man named Theodore from Drisht. However, the council of Dubrovnik was alert to this threat. They had been forewarned by the late Archbishop Elijah Saraka, who, on his deathbed, had cautioned them about potential dangers to the city's autonomy. Saraka mentioned that it would have been easy for him to seize power or hand it over to others. The Dubrovnik leaders, acting on this warning, intercepted letters written by Theodore, which referred to simony, causing a scandal. On May 4, 1360, the city sent a chancellor to the Pope to request a new archbishop, specifically opposing any attempt by a Dalmatian, Albanian, or Venetian or even someone from Dubrovnik to claim the position. By May 6, the council had decided to expel Bishop Dominic from the city, and Theodore was expelled on May 8.

After his expulsion from Dubrovnik, Dominic sought the support of King Louis I. He convinced the king to take action against the citizens of Dubrovnik, leading to a special deputation being sent to the king on December 16. The deputation included "false, forged, and fraudulent letters" that had been sent by the Bishop of Korčula in an attempt to secure the archbishopric of Dubrovnik.

In 1362, Dubrovnik appointed a new archbishop, the Genoese Hugo Cigala. As a result, Dominic's efforts to gain the archbishopric were completely undone.

== Later life and death ==
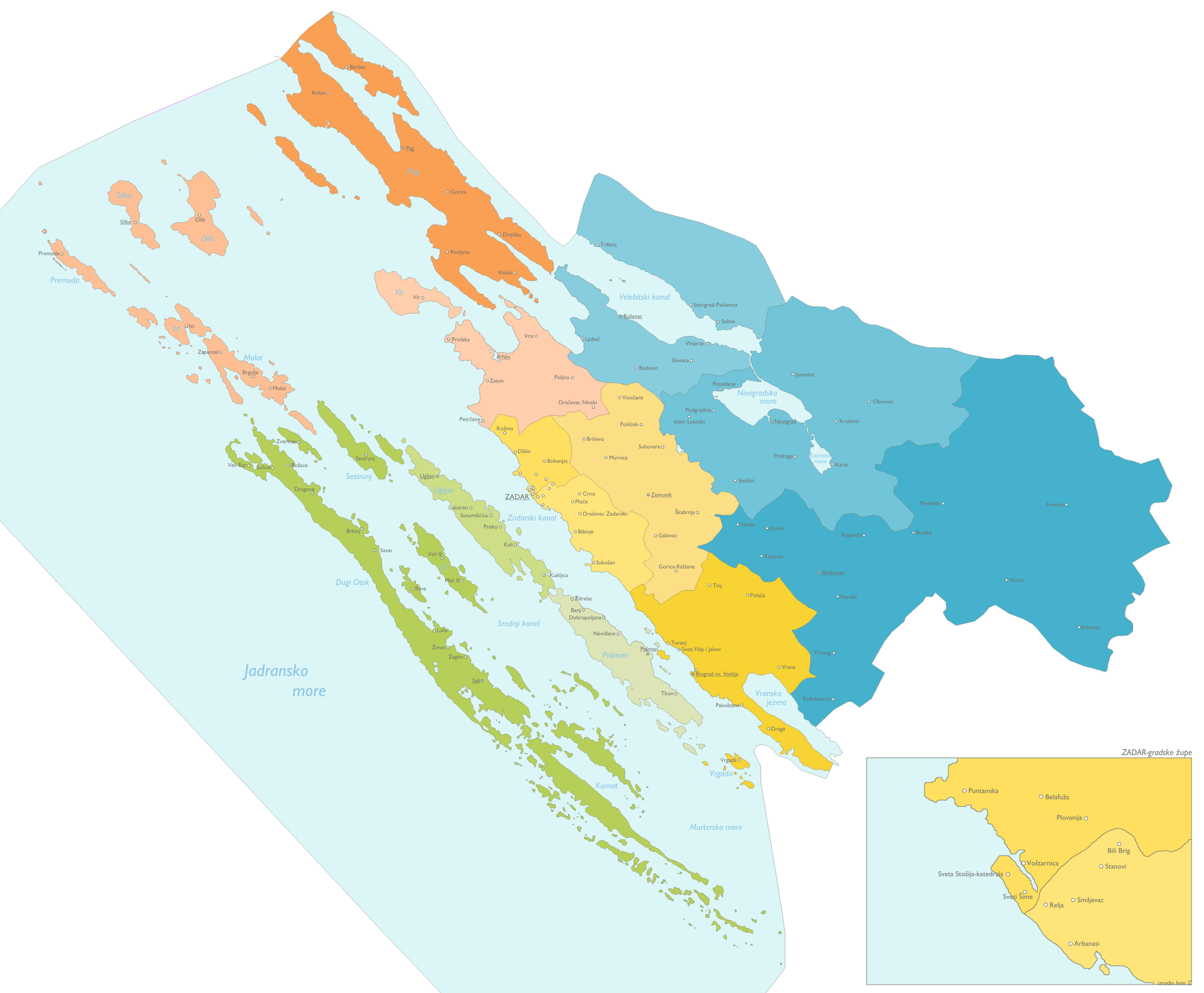
Archdiocese of Zadar

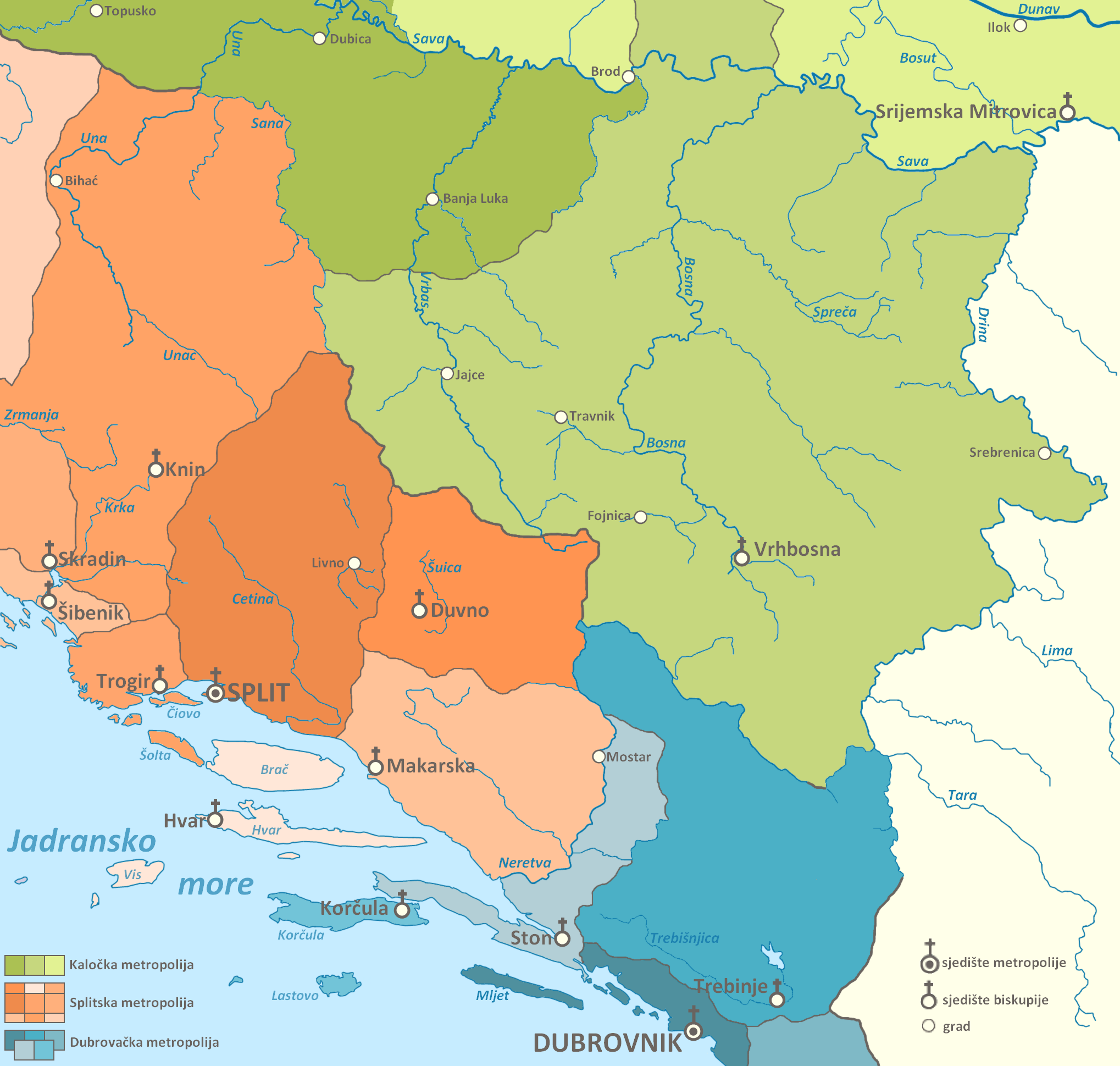
Diocese of Bosnia

Dominic Thopia was appointed as the Archbishop of Zadar by Pope Urban V, who issued a papal bull from Avignon to facilitate the transfer. Dominic's ambitions were ultimately fulfilled when he became the Archbishop of Zadar in 1367, a position he held until 1376. One source, however, suggests he may have assumed the position in 1368. During this time, Zadar was one of the most significant Adriatic cities within the Hungarian Kingdom. According to Bianchi, Dominic Thopia governed the church with great dedication, demonstrating notable charity towards the poor. He distributed all of his possessions to those in need, earning him the title Pater Pauperum (Father of the Poor).

Dominic played a role in supporting his nephew, Karl Thopia, during his takeover of Durrës in 1368.

Dominic Thopia obtained royal confirmation from King Louis, which allowed the church’s chapter to use the royal seal for validating public acts. This confirmation not only legitimized the chapter’s official documents but also provided a source of income for the chapter through associated privileges and fees.

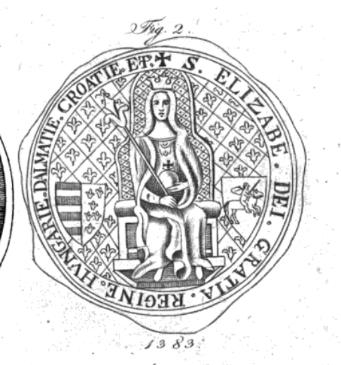
Elizabeth of Bosnia

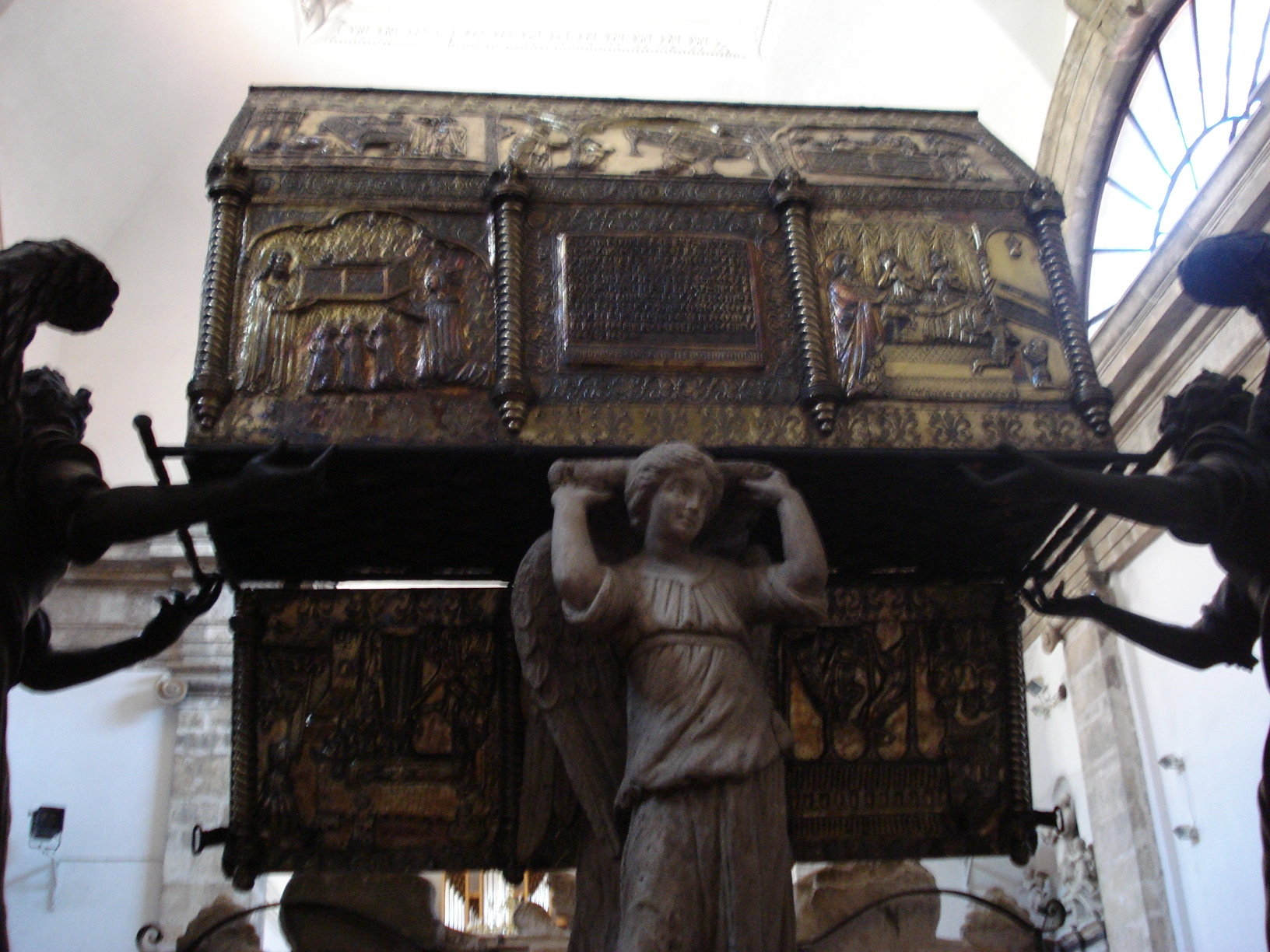
Chest of Saint Simeon, the silver ark dedicated to the relic of Saint Simeon, was a vow fulfilled by Queen Elisabeth during her visit to Zadar

In 1371, Dominic Thopia received King Louis and his wife, Elizabeth of Hungary, in Zadar. During this visit, both Thopia and the church were granted numerous privileges by the royal couple. Elizabeth, deeply moved by her devotion to the miraculous relic of Saint Simeon and grateful for the blessings she believed she had received through the saint, pledged to donate a silver ark. She honored this vow shortly thereafter. Dominic maintained strong relations with King Louis the Great and his wife.

Dominic Thopia did not stay in Zadar for the remainder of his life. Instead, on January 23, 1376, Pope Gregory XI, acting on the recommendation of King Louis, transferred him to the bishopric of Bosnia with a papal bull issued on the same day. He held the position of Bishop of Bosnia for six years.

Dominic Thopia died in 1382 in Đakovo.

== Legacy ==
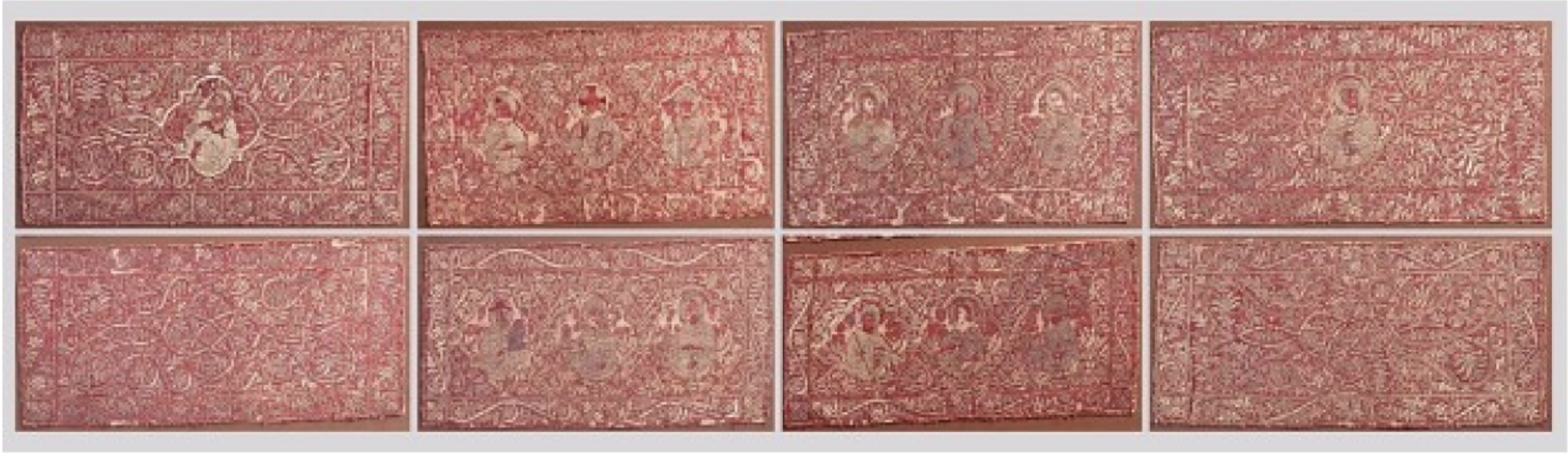
Silk embroidered fragments from 14th-century Zadar, believed to be created during the episcopate of Archbishop Dominic Thopia (1368–1376)

A collection of embroidered silk fragments from the time of Archbishop Dominic Thopia is displayed in the Permanent Exhibition of Sacred Art in Zadar. These eight fragments, once believed to be part of an altar frontal, feature depictions of saints. A new theory suggests that they may have originally been part of dalmatics, a type of liturgical garment, potentially adding significant typological value.

The eight fragments are designed to adorn two dalmatics, with four on each garment. The saints depicted in the Zadar fragments share stylistic similarities with pieces in the treasury of St. Mark’s Cathedral in Korčula, dating to the late 14th century. These saints were later sewn onto red velvet dalmatics in the 16th century, though their original function is believed to have remained unchanged.

The Zadar fragments also resemble an altar frontal from Budapest, which is believed to have been created in Zadar between 1358 and 1377. This suggests that the Zadar pieces were made in the second half of the 14th century, possibly during Archbishop Dominic Thopia’s tenure as archbishop of Zadar (1368–1376).

== See also ==
- Thopia family
- Principality of Albania (medieval)

== Notes ==
1. Sources conflict on the name of Dominic's brother, the father of Karl Thopia, with some identifying him as Andrea I Thopia and others as Tanush Thopia.

== Bibliography ==
- Bianchi, Carlo Federico (1877). Zara cristiana dell'arcidiacono capitolare [Christian Zadar of the Chapter Archdeacon] (in Italian). Tipografia Woditzka.
- Elsie, Robert (2003). Early Albania A Reader of Historical Texts, 11th-17th Centuries. Harrassowitz. ISBN 978-3-4470-4783-8.
- Fine, John V. A. (1994). The Late Medieval Balkans: A Critical Survey from the Late Twelfth Century to the Ottoman Conquest. University of Michigan Press. ISBN 978-0-4720-8260-5.
- Hopf, Karl (1873). Chroniques greco-romanes inedites ou peu connues [Unpublished or little-known Greco-Roman chronicles] (in French). Weidmann.
- Jacques, Edwin E. (2009). The Albanians: An Ethnic History from Prehistoric Times to the Present - Volume 1. McFarland & Company. ISBN 978-0-8995-0932-7.
- Lala, Etleva (2008). Regnum Albaniae, the Papal Curia, and the Western Visions of a Borderline Nobility. Central European University Department of Medieval Studies.
- Murzaku, Ines Angeli (2015). Monasticism in Eastern Europe and the Former Soviet Republics. Taylor & Francis. ISBN 978-1-3173-9105-0.
- Rossi, Maria Alessia; Sullivan, Alice Isabella (2024). The Routledge Handbook of Byzantine Visual Culture in the Danube Regions, 1300-1600. Taylor & Francis. ISBN 978-1-0038-4489-1.
- Sainty, Guy Stair (2018). The Constantinian Order of Saint George and the Angeli, Farnese and Bourbon families which governed it. Boletín Oficial del Estado. ISBN 978-8-4340-2506-6.
- Sufflay, Emil von; Jireček, Konstantin; Thallóczy, Lajos (1913). Acta et diplomata res Albaniae mediae aetatis illustrantia [Acts and documents illustrating the affairs of medieval Albania.] (in Latin). Typis A. Holzhausen.
- Sufflay, Emil von; Jireček, Konstantin; Thallóczy, Lajos (1918). Acta et diplomata res Albaniae mediae aetatis illustrantia - Volume 2 [Acts and documents illustrating the affairs of medieval Albania - Volume 2] (in Latin). typis A. Holzhausen.
- Šufflay, Milan (2012). Serbs and Albanians Their Symbiosis in the Middle Ages. GPX Alerion LLC. ISBN 978-0-9887-1292-8.
- Zavalani, Tajar (2015). History of Albania. Centre for Albanian Studies. ISBN 978-1-5075-9567-1.

Catholic Church titles
Preceded by Unknown	Bishop of Korčula & Ston; 1350-1368	Succeeded by Unknown
Preceded by Giacomo de Candia	Archbishop of Zadar; 1368-1376	Succeeded by Pietro Matafari
Preceded by Péter Siklósi	Bishop of Bosnia; 1376-1382	Succeeded by Đuro
