= Ciriaco Rocci =

Italian Catholic Cardinal

- Cardinal
- Church: Catholic Church
- See: Titular Bishop of Patras
- Appointed: 29 May 1628
- Term ended: 25 September 1651
- Other posts: Apostolic Nuncio to Switzerland, Nuncio to Holy Roman Empire

Orders
- Consecration: 2 July 1628 (Bishop) by Giulio Cesare Sacchetti
- Created cardinal: 18 May 1630 by Urban VIII

Personal details
- Born: 8 August 1582 Rome
- Died: 25 September 1651 (aged 69) Roma
- Buried: Santa Maria in Monserrato, Roma

Ciriaco Rocci (8 August 1582 – 25 September 1651) was an Italian Catholic Cardinal and papal Apostolic Nuncio to Switzerland and Holy Roman Empire.

== Life ==
Rocci was born on 8 August 1582 in Rome and studied law before entering the service of the church.

In 1628 he was appointed Latin Archbishop of Patras, consecrated bishop on 2 July 1628 by Cardinal Giulio Cesare Sacchetti and sent to Switzerland by Pope Urban VIII as an Apostolic Nuncio. In 1629 he returned to Rome and was elevated to cardinal in pectore. That same year, Rocci came into possession of one part of the Villa Muti which had been divided upon the death of his uncle (on his mother's side) Cardinal Pompeo Arrigoni.

His elevation to cardinal was not revealed until 1633, prior to which he was appointed as nuncio to Holy Roman Empire. After revelation of his cardinalate, he returned to Rome and was appointed Cardinal-Priest of San Salvatore in Lauro.

He served as Cardinal Legate (the governor of the province) of Ferrara between 1637 and 1640. He participated in the Papal conclave of 1644 which elected Pope Innocent X and between 1646 and 1647 he was appointed Camerlengo of the Sacred College of Cardinals.

Rocci died in Rome on 25 September 1651.

== Episcopal succession ==
Episcopal succession of Ciriaco Rocci

While bishop, he was the principal consecrator of:

- Matthias Geissler, Bishop of Wiener Neustadt (1631);
- Pietro Bellino, Bishop of Saluzzo (1636);
- Francesco Bianchi (bishop), Bishop of Sapë (1636);
- Orazio Muscettola, Bishop of Trevico (1636);
- Maurizio Ragano, Bishop of Fondi (1636);
- Sallustio Bartoli, Bishop of Strongoli (1636);
- Pietro Paolo de' Rustici, Bishop of Telese o Cerreto Sannita (1637);
- Franz Johann von Vogt von Altensumerau und Prasberg, Titular Bishop of Megara and Auxiliary Bishop of Konstanz (1641);
- Marco Antonio Tomati, Bishop of Bitetto (1641);
- Giulio Cesare Bergera, Archbishop of Turin (1643);
- Alessandro Salzilla, Bishop of Trevico (1643);
- Bartolomeo Vannini, Bishop of Nepi e Sutri (1643);
- Martin Bogdan, Bishop of Zagreb (1643);
- Giacomo Raimondi, Bishop of Melfi e Rapolla (1644);
- Francesco de' Notari, Bishop of Lavello (1644);
- Francesco Carducci, Bishop of Satriano e Campagna (1644);
- Mario Theodoli, Bishop of Imola (1644);
- Carlo Carafa della Spina, Bishop of Aversa (1645);
- Aniello Campagna, Bishop of Nusco (1645);
- Flavio Galletti, Bishop of Anglona-Tursi (1646);
- Michelangelo Brancavalerio, Bishop of Alatri (1648);
- Giovanni Tommaso Pinelli, Bishop of Molfetta (1648); and
- Leonardo Leria, Bishop of Minori (1649).
