= Ottavio Broglia =

Italian Roman Catholic prelate

Most Reverend Ottavio Broglia
- Bishop of Asti
- Church: Catholic Church
- Diocese: Diocese of Asti
- In office: 1624–1647
- Predecessor: Isidoro Pentorio
- Successor: Paolo Vincenzo Roveria

Orders
- Consecration: 12 March 1624 by Scipione Caffarelli-Borghese

Personal details
- Died: October 1647 Asti, Italy

Ottavio Broglia or Otavio Brolia (died October 1647) was a Roman Catholic prelate who served as Bishop of Asti (1624–1647).

== Biography ==
On 11 March 1624, Ottavio Broglia was appointed during the papacy of Pope Urban VIII as Bishop of Asti. On 12 March 1624, he was consecrated bishop by Scipione Caffarelli-Borghese, Archpriest of the Basilica di San Pietro in Vaticano with Raffaele Inviziati, Bishop Emeritus of Cefalonia e Zante, and Vincenzo Landinelli, Bishop Emeritus of Albenga, serving as co-consecrators. He served as Bishop of Asti until his death in October 1647.

== Episcopal succession ==
While bishop, he was the principal co-consecrator of:

- Giacinto Cordella, Bishop of Venafro (1635);
- Pietro Bellino, Bishop of Saluzzo (1636);
- Francesco Bianchi (bishop), Bishop of Sapë (1636); and
- Petras Parčevskis, Bishop of Smoleńsk (1636).

== External links and additional sources ==
- Cheney, David M. "Diocese of Asti". Catholic-Hierarchy.org. (for Chronology of Bishops) ^{[self-published]}
- Chow, Gabriel. "Diocese of Asti (Italy)". GCatholic.org. (for Chronology of Bishops) ^{[self-published]}

Catholic Church titles
Preceded by Isidoro Pentorio	Bishop of Asti; 1624–1647	Succeeded by Paolo Vincenzo Roveria
