= Porporato =

Porporato may refer to:

- Amilcare Porporato, an Italian-American engineer currently the Addy Professor of Civil and Environmental Engineering at Duke University
- Giuseppe Filippo Porporato, Bishop of Saluzzo from 1741 until his death in 1781
- Jean Porporato, French auto racer
