= Tosol Bardhi =

Prelate of the Roman Catholic Church

- Born: 1490; Lezhë area
- Died: 1582 (aged 91–92)

Tosol Bardhi (1490–1582) was an Albanian prelate of the Roman Catholic Church.

He was born in the area of Lezhë, modern northern Albania in 1490. His family was among the most important Albanian families of that time, and supported education throughout Albania. Other members of the family included several notable figures of Albanian history like Frang Bardhi, writer of the early eras of Albanian literature and Gjergj Bardhi, Archbishop of Antivari. Tosol Bardhi became bishop of the Roman Catholic Diocese of Sapë in Albania at the age of eighty. He died twelve years later in 1582.

== See also ==
- Frang Bardhi
- Gjergj Bardhi
- Nikollë Bardhi
