= Ponsa =

Hungarian-born Dominican friar and bishop

- Bishop of Bosnia
- Appointed: 1238
- Term ended: 1270/72
- Predecessor: John of Wildeshausen
- Successor: Roland

Orders
- Consecration: 26 April 1238 by Theodoric of Cumania

Personal details
- Died: 1270/72

Ponsa or Pousa (Hungarian: Pósa; Serbo-Croatian: Ponza, Понза or Povša, Повша) was a Hungarian-born Dominican friar who served as Bishop of Bosnia from 1238 to 1270 (or 1272). He was appointed by Pope Gregory IX in an effort to combat the autonomous Bosnian Church, but found no support in Bosnia. He fled the country in the 1240s, never to return.

== Appointment ==
Ponsa was born in the Kingdom of Hungary. Prior to his rise to the episcopate, Ponsa was a leading superior of the Dominican friars' missionary activities to the territory of the neighboring Cuman tribes. He was appointed Bishop of Bosnia in the midst of the Bosnian Crusade. The crusade's stated objective was to purge Bosnia from heresy, in other words to exterminate the autonomous Bosnian Church. His predecessor, the German-born Dominican John of Wildeshausen, repeatedly requested to be relieved of the bishopric, and in 1238 Pope Gregory IX wrote that the crusade was a success and that he had selected Ponsa as the new bishop. The pope called Ponsa as "virtous and thoughtful in spiritual and secular matters" in his letter to Theodoric, Bishop of Cumania. Ponsa was also to be assigned jurisdiction over Zachlumia, but probably only its western part, as the rest belonged to Serbia.

== Episcopate ==
Ponsa was consecrated by Bishop Theodoric on 26 April 1238. Pope Gregory believed Ponsa to be very capable, and named him apostolic legate to Bosnia for a term of three years. Matej Ninoslav, Ban of Bosnia, apparently refused to accept Ponsa as bishop, which the Pope regarded as an act of defiance. The crusaders penetrated into Central Bosnia, and a cathedral called Saint Peter's was built in Brdo (Burdo) above Vrhbosna (modern Sarajevo) in 1238. In order to solve the financial difficulties, Pope Gregory sent four different bulls on 22 December 1238 to Robert, Archbishop of Esztergom, and his suffragans, Hungarian prince Coloman, the Dominicans in Pécs, and the abbot of Pécsvárad to instruct them to support Ponsa and his activity in Bosnia.

Ponsa's episcopate lasted over three decades, but he functioned as a puppet of Hungary and had no support in Bosnia, where Bosnian Church still prevailed. Despite his determined efforts to settle Hungarian Dominican friars in Bosnia, Ponsa was expelled from Brdo by an heretic attack at the end of 1239. Thereafter, the bishop and his court established their temporary seat in Kreševo. By the first half of the 1240s, he was forced to leave the country and establish a residence in the Slavonian town of Đakovo, granted to him earlier by the Hungarian prince Coloman. The relocation was meant to be temporary, but from then on Ponsa and his successors up until Peregrin Saxon never set foot in Bosnia and had nothing to do with its affairs. Ponsa asked Pope Innocent IV to put his bishopric under the jurisdiction of the Archdiocese of Kalocsa instead of the Diocese of Ragusa (Dubrovnik). After a lengthy deliberation, the pope complied with the request on 26 August 1247. The official replacement did not happen until the beginning of the 14th century.

Ponsa is last mentioned as a living person in September 1270. He died by March 1272, when Roland first appears as his successor. There is a fringe theory, claimed by Benedictine librarian and archivist Géza Karsai, that Ponsa was identical with Anonymus (or Master P.), author of the Gesta Hungarorum.

== Sources ==
- Barun, Anđelko (2003). Svjedoci i učitelji: povijest franjevaca Bosne Srebrene (in Serbo-Croatian). Svjetlo riječi.
- Fine, John Van Antwerp Jr. (1994). The Late Medieval Balkans: A Critical Survey from the Late Twelfth Century to the Ottoman Conquest. Michigan: University of Michigan Press. ISBN 0-472-08260-4.
- Fine, John Van Antwerp Jr. (2007). The Bosnian Church: Its Place in State and Society from the Thirteenth to the Fifteenth Century. Saqi. ISBN 978-0-86356-503-8.
- Ternovácz, Bálint (2016). "A boszniai latin püspökség története 1344-ig [The History of the Latin Bishopric of Bosnia until 1344]". In Fábián, Laura; et al. (eds.). Micae Mediaevales V (in Hungarian). Eötvös Loránd University. pp. 215–228. ISBN 978-963-284-712-2.
- Ternovácz, Bálint (2017). "Domonkosok Boszniában a rend megtelepedésétől a 14. század közepéig [Dominicans in Bosnia from the Settlement of the Order to the Middle of the 14th Century]". In Csurgai Horváth, József (ed.). Az első 300 év Magyarországon és Európában. A Domonkos-rend a középkorban (in Hungarian). Alba Civitas Történeti Alapítvány. pp. 251–263. ISBN 978-963-88117-7-6.
- Vékony, Gábor (1991). "Anonymus kora és korhűsége IV. [The Age and Contemporariness of Anonymus, Part IV.]". Életünk (in Hungarian). 29 (4): 355–375. ISSN 0133-4751.
- Zsoldos, Attila (2011). Magyarország világi archontológiája, 1000–1301 [Secular Archontology of Hungary, 1000–1301] (in Hungarian). História, MTA Történettudományi Intézete. ISBN 978-963-9627-38-3.

Catholic Church titles
Preceded by John of Wildeshausen	Bishop of Bosnia; 1238–1270/72	Succeeded by Roland
