= Sape =

Sape, SAPE, Sapë, or Sapé may refer to:

== People ==
- Janet Sape (died 2017), businesswoman from Papua New Guinea
- Lauvale Sape, (born 1980), American football player

== Places ==
- Roman Catholic Diocese of Sapë, Albania
- Sapé, Paraíba, a municipality in Brazil
- Sape, a municipality in Albania officially known as Vau i Dejës
- Sape Strait, Indonesia

== Education and organizations ==
- La Sape (Société des Ambianceurs et des Personnes Élégantes), a social movement centered in Brazzaville, Republic of Congo
- Sociedade Angrense de Proteção Ecológica, an ecological organization
- Society of Avian Paleontology and Evolution, an international scientific society dedicated to the study of the evolution of birds; see Sapeornis

== Other uses ==
- French destroyer Sape
- Sapé language, a nearly extinct language spoken in Venezuela
- Sape, a synonym for the Sarangesa genus of butterfly
- Sape' or sapeh, a traditional lute in Borneo
- SAPE, the stock symbol for Sapient Corporation

== See also ==
- Sapa (disambiguation)
