= Egidio Quinto =

Egidio Quinto (Serbian: Egidio Kvinćo) (2 April 1653 – 1 June 1722) served as an archbishop of Antivari in the early 18th century.

Quinto was appointed Bishop of Sappa on 21 March 1707. He was later appointed as Archbishop of Antivari by Pope Clement XI on 8 February 1719.
