= The Apology of Scanderbeg =

1636 book by Frang Bardhi

The Apology of Scanderbeg is a work of Frang Bardhi, published at Venice in 1636, in Latin. Its complete title is Georgius Castriottus Epirensis vulgo Scanderbegh, Epirotarum Princeps fortissimus ac invictissimus suis et Patriae restitutus (George Castrioti of Epirus, commonly called Scanderbeg, the very mighty and invincible prince of Epirus restored to his people and his country).

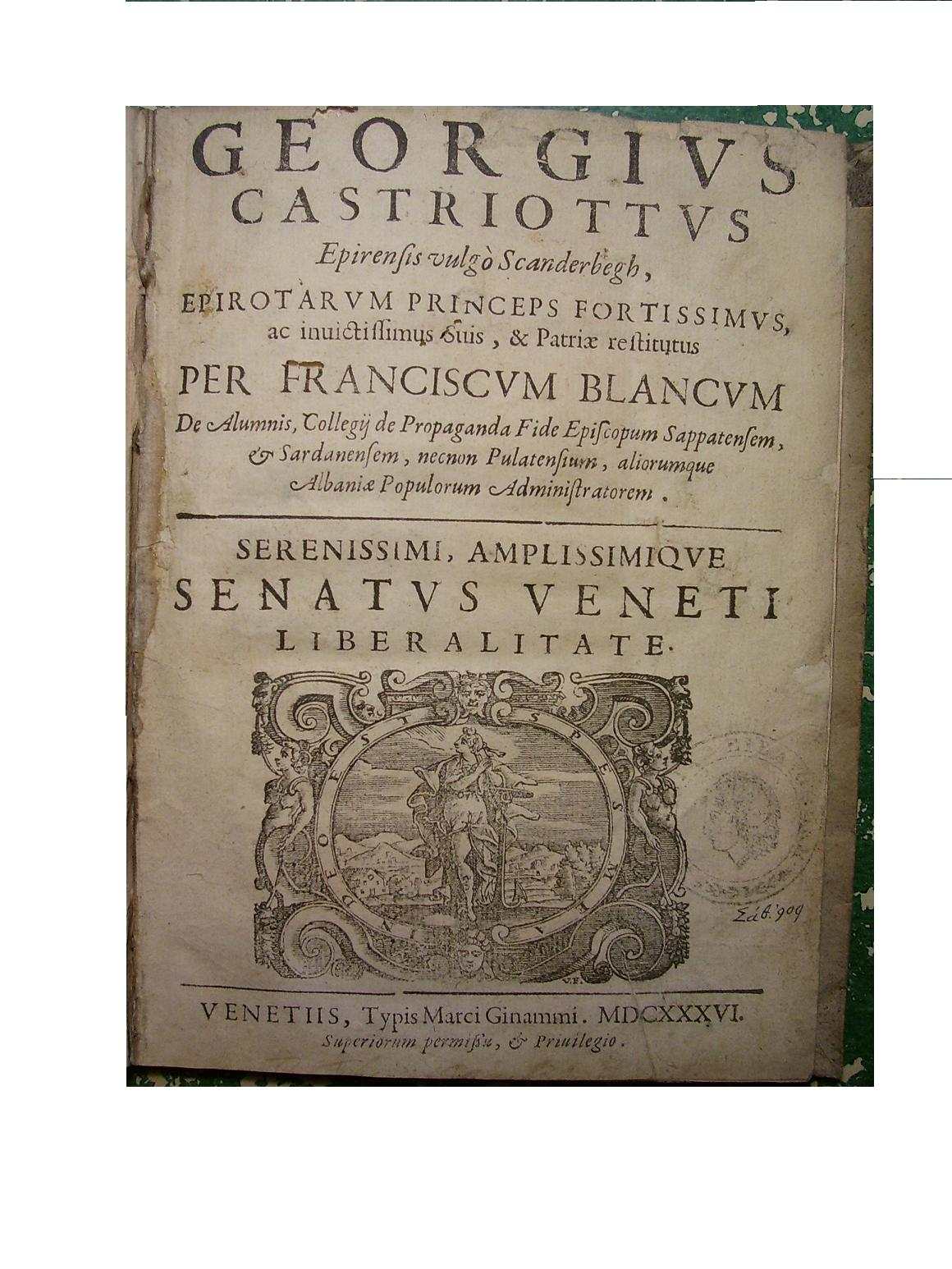
The Apology of Scanderbeg

== Description ==
The work is an apology dedicated to Scanderbeg, as son and hero of the Albanian people. The author wrote the work in 15 days, in the pique of anger, to refute the writings of a Bosnian bishop who claimed that Scanderbeg was not from Albania. In 1631, Giovanni Thomas Marnavich, Bishop of Bosnia, published a booklet, wherein he claimed that Scanderbeg, a national hero of Albania, was not from Albania but was instead a Bosnian Slav who belonged to the Marnavich family. Viewing the polemical work of Bishop Marnovich to be false, Bardhi immediately started work on a response. He set out to defend the Albanian claim to Skanderbeg as a matter of nationalistic pride and to restore what he considered to be the truth about the hero. He would say, "I took responsibility of this, not for any other reason except than show you, the reader, the naked truth, because there is no need to embellish it with beautiful but fake words". To bring proof that Scanderbeg is Albanian, the author makes certain historical arguments, along with giving weight to the myths and folk stories about Skanderbeg, highlighting that the memory of Skanderbeg vividly lived in the conscience of the country.
