= Lucjan Avgustini =

Former Albanian Roman Catholic Prelate

- Bishop of Sapë
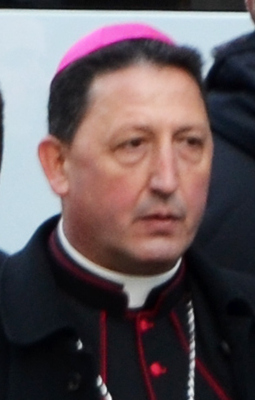
- Avgustini at the republican marches in Paris, 2015
- Church: Catholic Church
- Archdiocese: Shkodër–Pult
- Diocese: Sapë
- Appointed: 1 January 2007
- Installed: 12 December 2006
- Term ended: 29 November 2025
- Predecessor: Dodë Gjergji
- Successor: Simon Kulli

Personal details
- Born: 22 August 1963 Ferizaj, Kosovo, Socialist Federal Republic of Yugoslavia
- Died: 22 May 2016 (aged 52) Vau i Dejës, Shkodër, Albania

Styles of Lucjan Avgustini
- Reference style: His Excellency; The Most Reverend
- Spoken style: Your Excellency
- Religious style: Bishop

Lucjan Avgustini (28 August 1963 – 22 May 2016) was an Albanian prelate of the Catholic Church who served as the bishop of Sapë.

== Life ==
Avgustini was born in Ferizaj, SFR Yugoslavia. From 1989 to 2006 he was a priest of the Apostolic Administration of Prizren, while since 2006 he was the bishop of Sapë in Albania, until his death in 2016.
