= John Juvenal Ancina =

Italian Roman Catholic prelate

Blessed Bishop Giovanni Giovenale Ancina C.O.
- Bishop of Saluzzo
- Church: Roman Catholic Church
- Diocese: Saluzzo
- See: Saluzzo
- Appointed: 26 August 1602
- Installed: 6 March 1603
- Term ended: 30 August 1604
- Predecessor: Antonio Pichot
- Successor: Ottavio Viale

Orders
- Ordination: 9 June 1582
- Consecration: 1 September 1602 by Camillo Borghese
- Rank: Bishop

Personal details
- Born: Giovanni Giovenale Ancina; 19 October 1545 Fossano, Duchy of Savoy
- Died: 30 August 1604 (aged 58) Saluzzo, Duchy of Savoy
- Buried: 2 September 1604; Saluzzo Cathedral
- Education: University of Montpellier; University of Padua; University of Turin
- Motto: Pro ecclesia sua laborantem Episcopum decet mortem appetere ("It befits a bishop to draw near to death working on behalf of his church")

Sainthood
- Feast day: 30 August
- Venerated in: Roman Catholic Church
- Beatified: 9 February 1890; Saint Peter's Basilica, Kingdom of Italy by Pope Leo XIII
- Attributes: Episcopal attire
- Patronage: Fossano; Diocese of Saluzzo

Giovanni Giovenale Ancina (19 October 1545 – 30 August 1604) was an Italian Roman Catholic prelate who served as the Bishop of Saluzzo and was a professed member from the Oratorians. The bishop was also a scholar and music composer and was also known for being a noted orator. He served in the Oratorians as a simple priest for around two decades prior to his episcopal appointment which he attempted to elude for five months before submitting to Pope Clement VIII and accepting the papal appointment. He entered his diocese several months later where he became noted for his charitable work with the poor and his efforts to better implement the reforms of the Council of Trent.

His cause for sainthood commenced soon after his death though complications arose due to a lack of concrete evidence suggesting that he was killed in hatred of the faith due to his being poisoned so that framework for the cause was abandoned well into the cause's advanced stages. His beatification was celebrated under Pope Leo XIII in 1890 in Saint Peter's Basilica.

== Life ==
Giovanni Giovenale Ancina was born at dawn on 19 October 1545 in Fossano as the first of four children to the successful businessman Durando Ancina (of Spanish roots) and Lucia degli Araudini; he was in fear of death so his parents turned to Saint Juvenal to restore his health which happened so the saint's name became his middle name. His brother was the Oratorian priest Giovanni Matteo Ancina who followed him after birth and then two sisters.

The two brothers made a little chapel in their home and spent their spare time singing psalms and litanies before images of the Madonna and the saints since both were pious children. He studied at Montpellier in France (his father sent him there in 1559 though excellent results saw his admittance to a prestigious Turin institute) and then studied at Padua and Mondovì as well as in Turin; he graduated with degrees in both medicine and philosophical studies; he travelled to Montpellier alongside a friend Lazarus Marengo. In Mondovì he studied subjects such as mathematics and rhetoric and published the "Academia Subalpina" while there; he had not finished his course there when news reached him his father would soon die so he rushed to aid him in his final hours. After his father died he attended a Padua college where he wrote the Latin poem "The Naval Battle of the Christian Princes" in 1566 and dedicated this to the Doge of Venice Girolamo Priuli. The death of Pope Pius V in mid-1572 saw him recite an ode in public in the late pontiff's honor while making the accurate prediction that the next pope would title himself as "Gregory". His mother died while he was in Turin in 1569 and in 1572 the Order of Saint Augustine invited him to attend their provincial chapter at Savigliano.

He became an accomplished musician and man of letters. His talents and interests coupled with his various connections led him to a wide range of career options which included a stint as a professor of medicine at the Turin college. He first became a doctor and then in 1574 accompanied Count Federigo Madrucci to Rome as the count's personal doctor. It was there in Rome that Ancina attended the theological lectures that Cardinal Robert Bellarmine gave and the two became quick friends. Ancina had known he would not soon return to Turin so sent part of his works to the Order of Friars Minor Capuchin at Fossano and asked the remainder be given to a bookseller to sell on his behalf. But Ancina learnt the bookseller sold the books but used the profits for himself but wrote him a letter forgiving him while sending another to his relations asking that the bookseller be forgiven.

He also began to participate in the activities of the Oratorians of Saint Philip Neri and met Philip Neri himself around 1575. In the order he had been honored in sweeping the church or cleaning the candlesticks for he believed the menial jobs were better suited for him despite his learned prowess. He was content with three to four hours' worth of sleep and often slept on the bare floor; he wore a hair shirt and girdle and wore a coarse linen shirt over his cassock while choosing coarse food.

But Neri himself dissuaded Ancina from joining a religious order in favor of the Oratorians and so he entered that order on 1 October 1578 while he was made a deacon in 1579; Ancina himself made his solemn profession later on 7 October 1580. He was later ordained to the priesthood on 9 June 1582. He had been a deacon for an extended period until Neri bade him accept the priesthood. In 1586 he was sent to Naples to help in the establishment of a house for the Oratorians. He proved to be effective in reaching the population both through his preaching and his musical talents. It was there in Naples that Ancina published the "Tempio Armonico della Beatissima Vergine" which was a collection of spiritual songs set to a range of voices. Through his development of cultural activities he drew the participation of the aristocrats of the town. He also wrote the "Oratorio dei Principi" as a guide to the moral issues the people faced at the time. His fame increased over time and his lifelong friend Cardinal Cesare Baronio dubbed him "a new Saint Basil". He met Francesco Maria Tarugi - a fellow Oratorian - who was later named as a cardinal. His niece Lucilla Forti was a penniless orphan that he and his brother sent for to come to Rome and the brothers put her under the care of a matron and supported her education at the Dominican convent of Santa Maria Maddalena on Monte Cavallo. Forti was at first denied admittance into the order when she realized she wanted to become a nun herself but was soon granted permission. Just before her official reception she happened to meet the papal carriage where Pope Gregory XIV stopped and called her to him. The pope blessed her and expressed his delight at the fact that Ancina was her maternal uncle.

Around 1596 he became concerned when the episcopal sees of Nice and Vercelli became vacant for he heard a whisper that the Duke of Savoy wanted to nominate him to the pope for one of the positions. He was called to Rome in the autumn of 1596 where Pope Clement VIII's nephew Pietro Aldobrandini told him that the pope wanted to raise Ancina into the episcopate. The pope himself had referred to Ancina as the best prepared candidate for an episcopal role he had ever heard of. Ancina was reluctant to accept this nomination but in an ironic twist further enhanced his reputation through his notable preaching in the various places (in Loreto and Cingoli as well as Fermo amongst others) which he visited over the period of five months while perpetrating this evasion. In 1598 while hiding in San Severino he composed "The Wandering Pilgrim" which made the accurate prediction that the pope would die in 1605. But his hiding place was soon discovered and he was summoned to Rome where the pope asked him to preach before him despite the priest's surprise. The pope wanted him to become the Bishop of Mondovì but he begged that it be the see of Saluzzo so he could preach to heretics and convert their hearts; on 26 August 1602 the cardinal-nephew prevailed this plea on the pope and he was named as the Bishop of Saluzzo. Cardinal Alessandro de' Medici - the future Pope Leo XI - was delighted of his appointment and had hailed Ancina for his learnedness and his succinct responses to theological questions that were posed to him.

He received his episcopal consecration as a bishop on 1 September 1602 in the church of Santa Maria in Vallicella from Camillo Borghese - future Pope Paul V. Cardinal Francesco Maria Tarugi and Cardinal Cesare Baronio were also in attendance. Ancina left Rome on 2 October 1602 and arrived in Turin on 19 October before heading to Fossano where he left on 5 March 1603 to his new diocese. He took possession of his new episcopal see on 6 March 1603. He once sought leave from Clement VIII to renounce his see and go to Geneva to preach but the pope refused this plea.

Ancina made a major goal of his episcopate the implementation of the directives of the recent Council of Trent. In line with this he convened a gathering of the episcopate where he laid out the methods of reform for both those in the priesthood and for the faithful. He made arrangements to set up a religious educational institute to provide a higher level of knowledge and dedication in new priests. He gave a large emphasis to the instruction of the faithful in the teachings and beliefs of the faith for which he introduced the use of the new catechism that the Council of Trent had drawn up. He encouraged the adoration of the Blessed Sacrament.

The bishop Francis de Sales had a great admiration for Ancina who was later to establish and join an Oratorian house in his own diocese. The two often corresponded with each other and Ancina received a letter from his friend on 17 May 1599 who sent it from Turin at the time. On 3 May 1603 the Bishop de Sales had invited him to attend a sermon that he was to give.

The bishop died on 30 August 1604. It was his zeal which led to his death — a renegade monk poisoned him after the bishop disciplined him for visiting a convent with a sinful intent. Ancina knew quite well who his poisoner was but refused to provide a statement against him. On 20 August the monk gave him wine laced with poison under the guise of reconciliation; the bishop was surprised at the gesture but drank the contents. The monk then fled to Genoa under the false pretense of going to Savona for a pilgrimage. The bishop began vomiting and was confined to his bed as his condition worsened and when suffering overcame him he murmured to himself: "Oh! What poison! What terrible poison this is!" The Duke of Savoy heard of this and sent his private doctor to help Ancina though nothing could be done at that stage. He summoned his brother to him and then asked for his confession to be heard before receiving the Extreme Unction. The ailing bishop asked to be laid on the bare floor to die and he invoked Saint Gennaro - whom he fostered a devotion to. His final words were: "Jesus, sweet Jesus, with Mary give peace to my soul". He was buried in the diocesan cathedral. In 1620 his remains were exhumed and found well-preserved but turned into dust upon contact with the air lest for the skull and several bones.

== Beatification ==
The beatification process opened in an informative process in 1619 in Saluzzo and Fossano as well as in Genoa and Acqui. The formal introduction to the cause came on 2 December 1621 under Pope Gregory XV and he became titled as a Servant of God as a result. Pope Urban VIII confirmed the cause's opening in 1624 and an apostolic process opened in Rome and Saluzzo as well as Turin and Naples. The cause was then suspended for a time until 1666 when Pope Alexander VII reopened it. Francis de Sales attested to Ancina's saintliness sometime in the 1660s and the Congregation for Rites later validated the informative and apostolic processes in 1716.

The confirmation of Ancina's life of heroic virtue allowed for Pope Pius IX to title him as Venerable on 29 January 1870. Pope Leo XIII later approved two miracles attributed to Ancina's intercession on 30 May 1889 and beatified the late bishop in Saint Peter's Basilica on 9 February 1890.

== See also ==
- Diocese of Saluzzo
- Oratory of Saint Philip Neri
