= Pietro Bellino =

Italian Roman Catholic prelate

Most Reverend Pietro Bellino
- Bishop of Saluzzo
- Church: Catholic Church
- Diocese: Diocese of Saluzzo
- In office: 1636–1641
- Predecessor: Giacomo Marenco
- Successor: Francesco Agostino della Chiesa

Orders
- Consecration: 30 March 1636 by Ciriaco Rocci

Personal details
- Died: 14 January 1641 Saluzzo, Italy

Pietro Bellino (died 14 January 1641) was a Roman Catholic prelate who served as Bishop of Saluzzo (1636–1641).

== Biography ==
On 3 March 1636, Pietro Bellino was appointed during the papacy of Pope Urban VIII as Bishop of Saluzzo.

On 30 March 1636, he was consecrated bishop by Ciriaco Rocci, Cardinal-Priest of San Salvatore in Lauro, with Giovanni Battista Altieri, Bishop Emeritus of Camerino, and Ottavio Broglia, Bishop of Asti, serving as co-consecrators.

He served as Bishop of Saluzzo until his death on 14 January 1641.

While bishop, he was the principal co-consecrator of Giusto Guérin, Bishop of Genève (1639).

Catholic Church titles
Preceded by Giacomo Marenco	Bishop of Saluzzo; 1636–1641	Succeeded by Francesco Agostino della Chiesa
