= Nikollë Bardhi =

Albanian Roman Catholic prelate

- Born: 1551; Lezhë, Ottoman Empire (now Albania)
- Died: 1617 (aged 65–66)
- Known for: Albanian struggle against the Ottoman Empire

Nikollë Bardhi (1551–1617) was an Albanian prelate of the Roman Catholic Church. He played a key role in the Albanian struggle against the Ottoman Empire.

== Life ==
Nikollë Bardhi was born in region of Zadrima, Lezhë, modern northern Albania in 1551. His family included several notable figures of Albanian history like Frang Bardhi, writer of the early eras of Albanian literature and the Archbishop of Antivari, Gjergj Bardhi who was Nikollë Bardhi's nephew. After becoming a vicar in Rodon he was appointed vicar of the diocese of Mat, when Nikollë Mekajshi was the bishop of the diocese. In 1597 he became apostolic vicar and later bishop of the Roman Catholic Diocese of Sapë.

== See also ==
- Frang Bardhi
- Gjergj Bardhi
- Tosol Bardhi
