= Diocese of Pulati =

Former Roman Catholic diocese in Albania

The Diocese of Pult (Latin Pulati) (Latin: Dioecesis Pulatensis) was a Latin Catholic diocese in northern Albania until abolished in 2005, when it was merged into the Metropolitan Archdiocese of Shkodër-Pult.

== History ==
The bishopric was founded circa 900, without precursor jurisdiction. Many incumbents were Italian and/or member of a missionary regular order. Some came from another see, more were transferred or promoted elsewhere.

The alleged first Bishop of Pulati (877) was a suffragan of the Archdiocese of Dioclea. After the overthrow of Dioclea, the bishops of Pulati were Suffragans of the Greek Archdiocese of Salonica (Thessalonica). During the tenth century, and even later, Pulati is not mentioned.

From 1340 to 1520 there were two Dioceses of Pulati, in Latin Polata major and Polata minor; the bishops of the latter were known as Episcopi Sosbrienses, from the Franciscan hospice in the village of Sosi.

Under the Turkish rule, with the decay of its population, after the death of Vincenzo Giovanelli appointed in 1656, the bishops no longer resided at Pulati.

The Franciscan Peter Karagić was nominated Bishop of Pulati in 1697 and Apostolic administrator of the Archdiocese of Scopia in Albania. From 1867, Pulati was a Suffragan of the Albanian Metropolitan Archdiocese of Scutari.

== Episcopal ordinaries ==
(all Roman Rite)

Suffragan Bishops of Pult (Pulati)

First centuries unavailable or dubious

- Pietro (1351?–?)
- Nicola (1367.04.21 – ?), previously Titular Bishop of Philadelphia in Arabia (? – 1367.04.21)
- Lorenzo da Portegno (1370.08.19 – death 1376?)
- Matteo da Norcia (1376.08.27 – ?)
- Sergio (1391?–?)
- Alessio (1405.11.04 – ?)
- Nicolo Zaccaria (1421.05.05 – ?)
- Dusman (1427.04.30 – ?)
- Nicola (1454? – death 1470?)
- Stefano (1470.10.26 – ?)
- Giovanni (1475.05.10 – ?)
- Martino Massarech (1515.04.18 – ?)
- Isidoro Almopaveri (1518.04.12 – ?)
- John Stanywell (1524.04.28 – ?)
- Lorenzo Santarelli (1529.06.07 – ?)
- Martino Polono (1574?–?)
- Vincenzo Giovannelli (1656.01.10 – 1660)
- Giacinto da Sezze (1660.09.20 – ?)
- Peter Karagić (1698.09.15 – 1702.09.25), previously Apostolic Administrator of Shkodrë (Albania) (1698.08.20 – 1698.09.15); later Metropolitan Archbishop of Skopje (Macedonia) (1702.09.25 – ?)
- Marino Gini (1703.11.26 – 1719.03.29), later Bishop of Sapë (Albania) (1719.03.29 – 1720)
- Pietro Scurra (1719.05.15 – 1720.09.30), later Archbishop of Durrës (Durazzo, Albania) (1720.09.30 – death 1737)
- Apostolic Administrator Giovanni Galata (1720.12.23 – 1728.11.15), while Bishop of Sapë (Albania) (1720.09.30 – 1728.11.15); later Bishop of Lezhë (Albania) (1728.11.15 – 1739.01.26), finally Archbishop of Durrës (Durazzo, Albania) (1739.01.26 – death 1752)
- Marco de Luchi (1731.09.24 – 1746.03.09), later Metropolitan Archbishop of Bar (Montenegro) (1746.03.09 – death 1749.07.07)
- Serafino Torriani (1746.03.09 – 1754.09.19)
- Giorgio Giunchi (1757.01.03 – 1765.12.09), later Bishop of Lezhë (Albania) (1765.12.09 – 1786.07.24), Metropolitan Archbishop of Bar (Montenegro)) (1786.07.24 – death 1787.01.26) and Bishop of Budua (1786.09.01 – 1787.01.26)
- Alessandro Bianchi (1766.01.27 – 1780)
- Giovanni Logorezzi (1781.04.02 – 1791.09.26), next Bishop of Sapë (Albania) (1791.09.26 – death 1795)
- Marco Negri (1791.09.26 – 1808.07.08), next Bishop of Sapë (Albania) (1808.07.08 – death 1820.05.13)
- Antonio Dodmassei (1808.07.08 – 1814.12.19), next Bishop of Shkodrë (Albania) (1814.12.19 – death 1816.07.21)
- Michelangelo Calmet (1814.12.19 – 1816.07.22), next Bishop of Ripatransone (Italy) (1816.07.22 – death 1817.08.08)
- Pietro Ginaj (1817.07.04 – 1832.04.01)
- Paolo Dodmassei (1847.07.30 – 1858.05.02), next Bishop of Lezhë (Albania) (1858.05.02 – death 1868.09.27)
- Paškal Vujičić (1858.06.01 – 1860.09.28): later Titular Bishop of Antiphellus (1860.09.28 – death 1888.03.17) as Apostolic Vicar of Egypt) (1860.09.28 – retired 1866.08.06) and Apostolic Delegate (papal envoy) to Egypt and Arabia (1860.09.28 – retired 1866.08.06) and later as Apostolic Vicar of Bosnia (Bosnia and Herzegovina) (1866.08.06 – retired 1881)
- Dario Bucciarelli (1860.12.09 – 1864.06.06), later Metropolitan Archbishop of Skopje (Macedonia) (1864.06.06 – death 1878)
- Paolo Beriscia (1864.06.14 – death 1869.08.21)
- Alberto Cracchi (1870.05.24 – death 1887.12.22)
- Lorenzo Petris de Dolammare (1889.01.07 – 1890.08.05), later Bishop of Sapë (Albania) (1890.08.05 – 1892.12.20), emeritate as Titular Bishop of Hesbon (1893.01.21 – death 1910.09.03)
- Nicola Marconi, emeritate as Titular Archbishop of Theodosiopolis (1911.01.21 – death 1930.04.11)
- Bernardino Shlaku (1911.01.31 – death 1956.11.09), succeeding as previous Coadjutor Bishop of Pult (1910.01.08 – 1911.01.31) and Titular Bishop of Tiberias (1910.01.08 – 1911.01.31)
- Apostolic Administrator Antonin Fishta (1956.12.17 – death 1980.01.12), Titular Bishop of Amyzon (1956.12.17 – 1980.01.12), no other prelature
- Robert Ashta (1992.12.25 – death 1998.04.12)

== Sources and external links ==
- GCatholic, with Google satellite photo
