= Simon Kulli =

Albanian Catholic bishop (1973–2025)

- Bishop of Sapë
- Church: Catholic Church
- Archdiocese: Shkodër–Pult
- Diocese: Sapë
- Appointed: 15 June 2017
- Installed: 14 September 2017
- Term ended: 29 November 2025
- Predecessor: Lucjan Avgustini
- Successor: Vacant

Orders
- Ordination: 29 June 2000 by Angelo Massafra
- Consecration: 14 September 2017 by Charles John Brown, Angelo Massafra and Dodë Gjergji

Personal details
- Born: 14 February 1973 Pistull, Albania
- Died: 29 November 2025 (aged 52) Vau i Dejës, Albania
- Motto: Caritas Christi urget nos
- Coat of arms

Styles of Simon Kulli
- Reference style: His Excellency; The Most Reverend
- Spoken style: Your Excellency
- Religious style: Archbishop

Simon Kulli (14 February 1973 – 29 November 2025) was an Albanian Catholic prelate. He was the bishop of Sapë from 2017 until his death. Kulli died in Vau i Dejës, Albania on 29 November 2025, at the age of 52.

Catholic Church titles
Preceded by Lucjan Avgustini	Bishop of Sapë; 2017–2025	Succeeded by Vacant
