= Paolo Vincenzo Rovero =

Italian Roman Catholic prelate

Most Reverend Paolo Vincenzo Rovero
- Bishop of Asti
- Church: Catholic Church
- Diocese: Diocese of Asti
- In office: 1655–1665
- Predecessor: Ottavio Broglia
- Successor: Marco Antonio Tomati

Orders
- Consecration: 31 October 1655 by Marcantonio Franciotti

Personal details
- Born: Italy
- Died: 25 October 1665 Asti, Italy

Paolo Vincenzo Rovero, B. or Paolo Vincenzo Roero or Paolo Vincenzo Roverio (died 25 October 1665) was a Roman Catholic prelate who served as Bishop of Asti (1655–1665).

== Biography ==
Paolo Vincenzo Rovero was born in Italy and ordained a priest in the Clerics Regular of Saint Paul. On 5 October 1655, he was appointed during the papacy of Pope Innocent X as Bishop of Asti. On 31 October 1655, he was consecrated bishop by Marcantonio Franciotti, Cardinal-Priest of Santa Maria della Pace. He served as Bishop of Asti until his death on 25 October 1665.

While bishop, he was the principal co-consecrator of Filiberto Alberto Bailly, Bishop of Aosta (1659); and Michael Angelus Broglia, Bishop of Vercelli (1663).

== External links and additional sources ==
- Cheney, David M. "Diocese of Asti". Catholic-Hierarchy.org. (for Chronology of Bishops) ^{[self-published]}
- Chow, Gabriel. "Diocese of Asti (Italy)". GCatholic.org. (for Chronology of Bishops) ^{[self-published]}

Catholic Church titles
Preceded by Ottavio Broglia	Bishop of Asti; 1655–1665	Succeeded by Marco Antonio Tomati
