= Ante Matković =

Roman catholic prelate

Most Reverend Antonio Poli de Mathaeis
- Bishop of Bosnia
- Church: Catholic Church
- Diocese: Diocese of Bosnia
- In office: 1573–1588
- Predecessor: Donato della Torre
- Successor: Lajos Ujlaky

Personal details
- Died: 1588

Antonio Poli de Mathaeis (also Anto Matković or Antonio Poli de Matteis) (died in 1588) was a Roman Catholic prelate who served as Bishop of Bosnia (1573–1588).

== Biography ==
Antonio Poli de Mathaeis was ordained a friar in the Order of Friars Minor. On 26 Aug 1573, he was appointed during the papacy of Pope Gregory XIII as Bishop of Bosnia. He served as Bishop of Bosnia until his death in 1588. While bishop, he was the principal co-consecrator of Leonard Abel, Titular Bishop of Sidon (1582).

Catholic Church titles
Preceded by Donato della Torre	Bishop of Bosnia; 1573–1588	Succeeded by Lajos Ujlaky
