= Diego Natale Bona =

Italian Roman Catholic bishop

- Bishop of Saluzzo
- Church: Catholic Church
- Diocese: Diocese of Saluzzo
- In office: 17 January 1994 – 16 April 2003
- Predecessor: Sebastiano Dho
- Successor: Giuseppe Guerrini
- Previous posts: Bishop of Porto–Santa Rufina (1986-1994); Bishop of Porto e Santa Rufina (1985-1986)

Orders
- Ordination: 8 October 1950
- Consecration: 1 December 1985 by Ugo Poletti

Personal details
- Born: 11 December 1926 Castiglione Tinella, Province of Cuneo, Kingdom of Italy
- Died: 29 April 2017 (aged 90) Rome, Italy

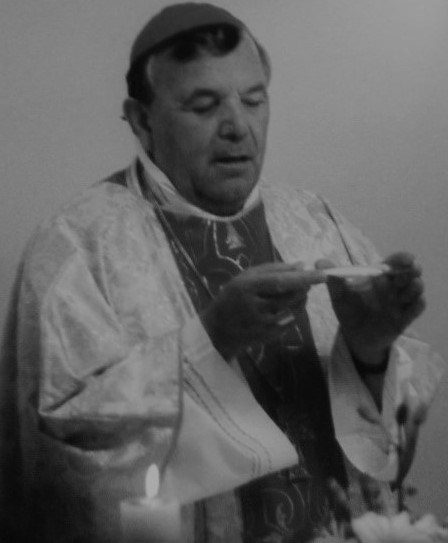
S.E. Mons. Diego Natale Bona celebrates a mass at a parish of the diocese of Porto and Santa Rufina in 2002

Diego Natale Bona (11 December 1926 – 29 April 2017) was a Catholic bishop.

Ordained to the priesthood in 1950, Bona served as bishop of the Diocese of Porto-Santa Rufina, Italy from 1985 to 1994. He then served as bishop of the Diocese of Saluzzo from 1994 to 2003.
