= Giorgio Vladagni =

18th-century Albanian Roman Catholic Prelate

Giorgio Vladagni (Latin: Georgius Vladagnus, Albanian: Gjergj Vladanji, Serbo-Croatian: Đorđe Vladanji; 1712-1765) was an Albanian prelate of the Roman Catholic Church.

== Life ==
Vladagni was born in Shkodër, modern northern Albania in 1712 to a family, many members of which had become prelates of the Roman Catholic Church. From 1750, when he succeeded his brother Lazër Vladanji, who became Archbishop of the Roman Catholic Archdiocese of Bar, until his death in 1765 he was the Bishop of the Roman Catholic Diocese of Sapë In 2008 German historian Peter Bartl published his correspondence with the Congregation for the Evangelization of Peoples.
