= Radogost (bishop) =

Catholic clergyman

Radogost or Radigost (latinized as Rhadagastus; Serbian Cyrillic: Радогост/Радигост) was a Catholic clergyman who served as Bishop of Bosnia in the late 12th century. As his vernacular name suggests, he was a local cleric and was chosen by Bosnians themselves. Radogost was consecrated by Bernard, Archbishop of Ragusa, in 1189. On that occasion, Radogost brought presents for Pope Clement III from Ban Kulin, ruler of Bosnia. The historian John Van Antwerp Fine, Jr. dismisses the chronicler Mavro Orbini's date of 1171 because there is no evidence that Kulin was already Ban of Bosnia at that time.

At a time when the Papacy insisted on using Latin as the liturgical language, Radogost was noted for not knowing Latin at all, nor any foreign language. Thus, Radogost "swore the oath of faith and obedience to his metropolitan in ... the Slavic language". He justified his celebration of mass in Church Slavonic to his metropolitan, claiming that this was a privilege granted to his predecessors by Pope John VIII in 880.

Bishop Radogost likely died in 1203; on 10 June, the papal legate John de Casamaris reported the death of the Bishop of Bosnia to Pope Innocent III. It is unknown whether he died before or after the Abjuration of Bilino Polje, whereby Kulin and his closest associates agreed on the future management of the Catholic Church in Bosnia. If he died after 8 April, when the abjuration took place, he was absent from the meeting.

Catholic Church titles
Preceded by Milovan	Bishop of Bosnia; 1189-1203	Succeeded by Dragonja
