= John of Wildeshausen =

German Dominican friar

Servant of God John of Wildeshausen O.P.
- Bishop of Bosnia
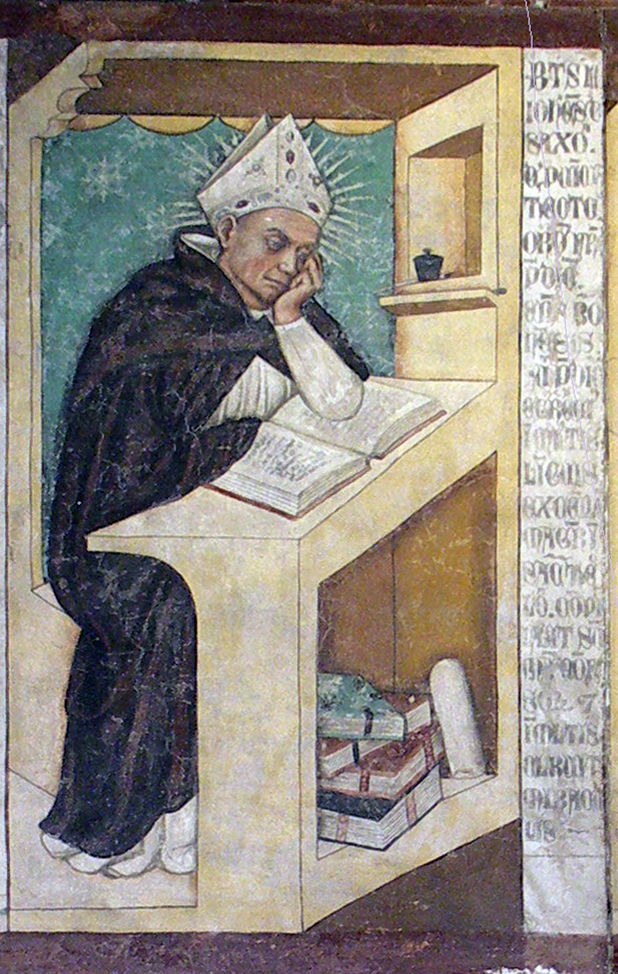
- Diocese: Diocese of Bosnia
- Installed: 1233
- Term ended: 1237
- Other post: Master General of the Dominican Order (1241-1252)

Orders
- Consecration: 1233

Personal details
- Born: ca. 1180 Wildeshausen, Westphalia, Holy Roman Empire
- Died: 4 November 1252 Strasbourg, France
- Buried: Priory Church of St. Bartholomew; Strasbourg, France (destroyed 16th century)
- Denomination: Roman Catholic

John of Wildeshausen, O.P., also called Johannes Teutonicus (c. 1180 – 4 November 1252) was a German Dominican friar, who was made bishop of Bosnia and later the fourth master general of the Dominican Order.

== Biography ==
=== Early life ===
John, a nobleman, was born in his family's castle in Wildeshausen in about 1180, where he received his early education. When he was of age, he went to Bologna to advance his studies. The records show that he showed himself to have an extremely agile mind and winning personality. This is shown in the fast friendship John forged with the teenaged Holy Roman Emperor Frederick II when they met during a stay Frederick made while returning home from a diplomatic mission, sometime about 1212. This was despite a significant disparity in age between them. John accompanied Frederick back to their homeland, where he joined the imperial court.

It would appear that court life did not agree with John, as he soon returned to Bologna, where he came to know the Dominican Order. Despite his age and standing (possibly already having received Holy Orders), John was eager to join in the new enterprise, and received the Dominican habit from the founder of the Order, St. Dominic himself, who possibly then also professed him at the same time. This was in either late 1219 or early 1220. He was almost immediately sent out to preach, in keeping with Dominic's vision of mission of the Order, especially since John was already known as an eloquent preacher, equally fluent in Latin, Italian and French, as well as his native German. John wandered through northern Italy, France and Germany, as far as Austria, preaching the Gospel everywhere he went, traveling entirely on foot, though he was already advanced in age for his era. After this tour, he settled in Strasbourg as his base.

=== Provincial and bishop ===
In 1224 he was called to Rome by Pope Honorius III, where he was named an Apostolic Penitentiary and assigned to accompany the Cistercian cardinal Conrad of Urach in preaching a crusade to the Holy Land in southern Germany. While on this mission, John mediated in a longstanding conflict between the Stedingen and the Archbishop of Bremen, Gerhard II. He was sent back on the same mission with another papal legate, Cardinal Otho di Monferrato, later that same year.

Upon his return to Rome, John was then assigned to join his friend and fellow Dominican, Paul of Hungary, to serve as Prior Provincial of the new province Paul had founded for his homeland, a post in which John served from about 1231 to 1233. At that point, due to the removal from office of the incumbent due to heresy, he was named bishop of Bosnia (then part of the Kingdom of Hungary) by the papal legate, the Cistercian cardinal James of Pecorara, a position he accepted only under religious obedience. John would travel his extensive diocese on foot, leading, or driving ahead of him, a little ass which carried his books and vestments. He was at once bishop and missionary. His preaching was incessant; his charity inexhaustible. On himself he spent next to nothing, for he regarded the revenues of his diocese as the property of the poor, and there were many within his jurisdiction. He was given valuable assistance by King Coloman, the Duke of Slavonia (brother of the popular saint, Elizabeth of Hungary). John served in this post from 1233 to 1237, when, after repeated requests, he was allowed to retire by Pope Gregory IX. John was so eager to relinquish the office, that he renounced any pension to which he was entitled from the diocese, and returned to his monastery in Strasbourg.

John was not to rest in his retirement, as he was almost immediately sent in 1237 as an envoy of Pope Gregory IX to the Bulgarian Prince Asen II. The following year, the General Chapter of the Order met in Bologna at Pentecost, in the course of which the capitulars chose John as Prior Provincial of Lombardy, a post in which he served from 1238 to 1240. This was not a position which offered rest, as friars of that Province were actively opposed to the political ambitions of John's old friend, the Emperor Frederick, who was seeking control of the entire Italian peninsula. Additionally, they were loyal to the Pope, who was engaged in widespread hostilities with Frederick over competing territorial claims. As John was a subject of the Emperor, it was a particularly difficult spot for him. Just as in the start of their friendship, the fact that John was able to walk a fine line which never angered either side in the struggle again attested to his capacity for being able to work with all.

=== Master General ===
In 1240, the incumbent Master General of the Order, Raymond of Penyafort, resigned the office. Thus, when the next General Chapter met in Paris on 19 May 1241, choosing his successor was at the head of their agenda. John attended the Chapter in his capacity as Prior Provincial. To his surprise and dismay, they chose him.

Among his many achievements during his administration was the continued policy of fidelity to the Papacy without needless criticism of secular rulers. He oversaw the completion of liturgical texts proper to the Order. He traveled throughout Europe visiting the different monasteries of the Order, still traveling on foot, with just his staff for support. He preached in five languages, and had good relations with the papal Curia.

Under his lead, the General Chapters decided two important changes in the Constitutions: The General Chapters would no longer alternate only between Bologna and Paris, but, by agreement, they were to be held: 1245 in Cologne, 1247 in Montpellier, 1249 in Trier and 1250 in London. The university monopoly of Paris was broken and from 1248 new general houses of study were established in Montpellier, Bologna, Cologne and Oxford.

John provided for the standardization of the Dominican liturgy; and gave the Order a firmer structure. He particularly promoted the missions and study.

=== Death ===
In obedience to a command of Pope Innocent IV, John accompanied the first Dominican cardinal, Hugh of St-Cher, to Germany subsequent to the death of Emperor Frederick. While there, overestimating his strength, he preached vigorously, as was his custom. This time, however, the strain proved too much for him and he collapsed. John was brought back to his old base by Strasbourg, and there he died on 4 November 1252.

He was initially buried in the church of the first monastery of the friars by Strasbourg, which was outside the walls of the city. By 1260, a new priory had been built within the city proper, one dedicated to St. Bartholomew. The General Chapter was held there that year, in the course of which John's remains were transported to the new church and re-interred there.

John was considered a saint during his life, and after death was venerated as saint, both within the Order and without. Documents were drawn up by his successor, Humbert of Romans, with the goal of seeking his canonization. His cause, however, never succeeded in Rome. In the 16th century, in the course of the Protestant Reformation, the Dominican church where he was entombed was seized by Huguenots, and the interior was gutted, to be used for their purposes.

== Notes ==
Catholic Church titles
Preceded by Vladimir	Bishop of Bosnia; 1233–1237	Succeeded by Ponsa
Preceded by Raymond of Penyafort	Master General of the Dominican Order; 1241–1252	Succeeded by Humbert de Romans
