= Lazër Vladanji =

Catholic bishop

Lazër Vladanji (1706–1786) was an Albanian prelate of the Roman Catholic Church in Ottoman Albania.

== Life ==
Lazër Vladanji was born in Shkodër, Ottoman Empire (modern-day Albania) in 1706 to a family, many members of which had become prelates of the Roman Catholic Church. From 1746 to 1749 he was the Bishop of the Roman Catholic Diocese of Sapë, when he was succeeded by his brother Gjergj Vladanji. From 1749 until his death in 1786 he was the Archbishop of the Roman Catholic Archdiocese of Bar.
