= Diocese of Bosnia =

Catholic diocese in Bosnia (until 1773)

Coordinates: 43.859411°N 18.425424°E

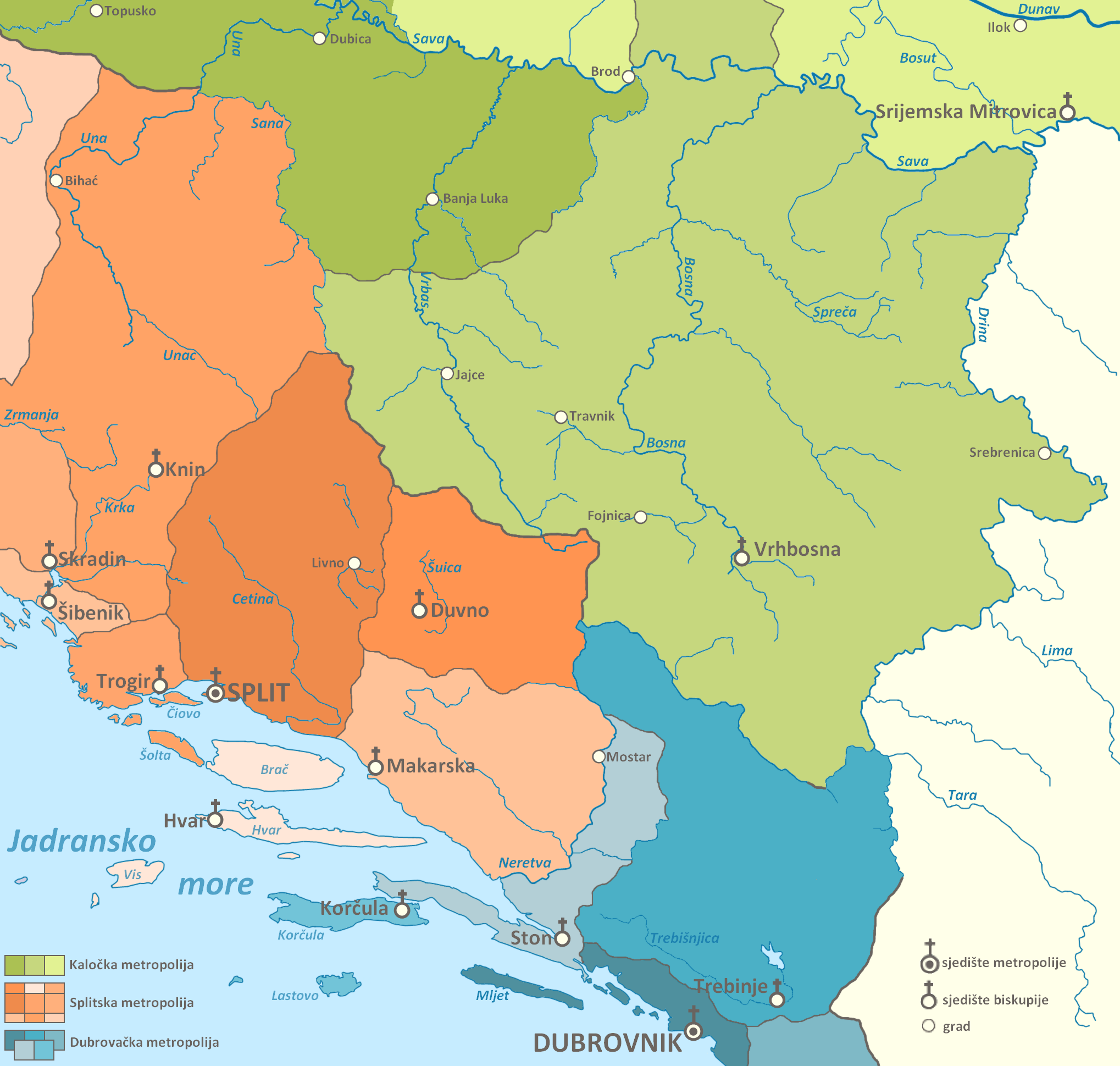
Diocese of Bosnia in the 15th century

Diocese of Bosnia (Latin: Dioecesis Bosniensis) was a Latin Catholic diocese that existed in Bosnia between the 11th and 15th centuries, and remained formally in existence until 1773.

== History ==
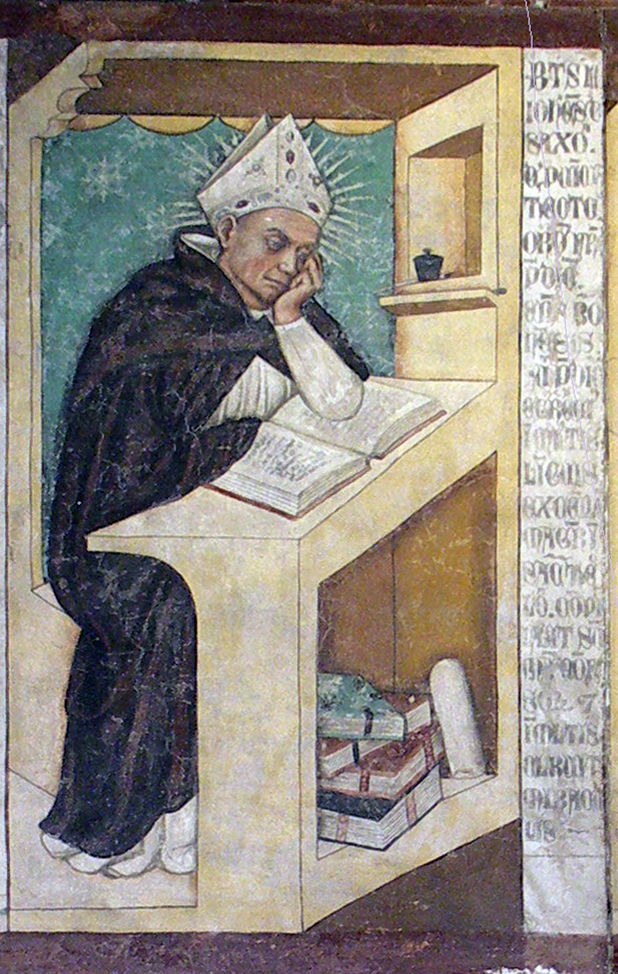
John of Wildeshausen, Bishop of Bosnia

It is not known precisely when the Bosnian diocese was established. Based on a collection of historical documents Provinciale Vetus, published in 1188, which mention it twice, once subordinated to the Archdiocese of Split, and another time under the Archdiocese of Ragusa, it is assumed that it came into existence between 1060 and 1074. The political and cultural circumstances of its foundation correspond to the time period of Croatian king Peter Krešimir IV (1058–1074).

During the 12th century, it was contested between those two archdioceses as well as another two, the Archdiocese of Antivari and the Archdiocese of Kalocsa. In 1244, an endowment of the parishes of Đakovo and Blezna by King Béla IV of Hungary listed the other parishes of the diocese, namely Vrhbosna, Neretva, Lepenica, Vidgossa (Viduša), Mile (near today's Visoko), Lašva, Uskoplje, Brod (near today's Zenica), Borač (near today's Rogatica).

In the 13th and 14th centuries, the Bishops of Bosnia were mainly Dominican missionaries who were sent in to combat the spread of the Bosnian Church. At the turn of the 14th century, the Franciscans also arrived with the same purpose, at first in Usora and Soli, at the request of Stephen Dragutin of Serbia. The two orders engaged in a prolonged dispute over the control of the province, in which the Franciscans ultimately prevailed, yet the weakened diocese still succumbed to the Ottoman conquest of Bosnia in 1463.

During the Ottoman occupation, the bishop of Bosnia had no effective control over the territory of Bosnia, rather, the Franciscan Province of Bosna Srebrena remained the primary vessel of Catholicism in the area. In 1735, the Holy See founded the Apostolic Vicariate for Bosnia, and assigned Franciscans as apostolic vicars to direct it, thereby formally ending the jurisdiction of this diocese over Bosnia.

In 1773, pope Clement XIV united formally the diocese with the Diocese of Syrmia on demand of the Holy Roman Empress and Queen of Hungary and Croatia, Maria Theresa. The 1773 change subordinated it to the Archdiocese of Zagreb. In 1881, the Archdiocese of Vrhbosna was established, that included the actual territory of Bosnia. The Diocese of Bosnia (Ðakovo) and Srijem became the present-day Archdiocese of Ðakovo-Osijek.

== Bishops of Bosnia ==
12th century
| From | Until | Incumbent | Notes |
|---|---|---|---|
| c. 1141 | | Vladislav | |
| c. 1151 | | Milovan | |
| c. 1171 | | Radogost | Also recorded as Rhadagastus. |
13th century
| From | Until | Incumbent | Notes |
| after 1209 | | Dragonja | |
| after 1210 | | Bratoslav | |
| 1223 | c. 1233 | Vladimir | |
| 1233 | 1239 | Bl. Ioannes Teutonicus | Dominican friar, also recorded as bl. Ivan Njemac. He resigned in 1239 and returned to the monastery. |
| 1239 | c. 1272 | Ponsa | Dominican friar, also recorded as Povša. He had built cathedral of Saint Peter in village Brdo (Vrhbosna). Because of the threats of Patarenes, Ponsa went from Vrhbosna to Đakovo in 1252 and since then the seat of the Bishop of Bosnia was mainly in Ðakovo. |
| c. 1272 | 1273 | Roland | |
| c. 1280 | | Andrija Ugrin | Dominican friar |
| c. 1289 | c. 1299 | Toma | |
14th century
| From | Until | Incumbent | Notes |
| c. 1301 | c. 1304 | Nikola | |
| 1308 | 1314 | Grgur | Augustinian |
| 1314 | 1316 | Benedikt Guiscard | |
| 1317 | 1334 | Petar I | Dominican friar |
| 1334 | 1336 | Sede vacante | |
| 1336 | 1347 | Lovro Lorandov | |
| 1347 | 1349 | Ivan II | |
| 1349 | 1356 | Peregrin Saxon | Franciscan friar |
| 1356 | 1376 | Peter Siklósi | |
| 1376 | 1382 | Dominic Thopia | |
| 1382 | 1387 | Đuro | |
| 1387 | 1408 | Ivan III Mrnjavić | |
15th century
| From | Until | Incumbent | Notes |
| 1408 | 1410 | Sede vacante | |
| 1410 | 1427 | Benedikt II de Benedictis | |
| 1427 | 1428 | Dionizije de Jakč de Kusely | |
| 1428 | 1436 | Josip de Bezza | |
| 1444 | 1454 | Rafael | |
| 1454 | 1455 | Filip Gothali | |
| 1455 | 1457 | Sede vacante | |
| 1457 | 1459 | Pavao | |
| 1459 | 1463 | Grgur II | Franciscan friar: Ottoman Empire conquered the Kingdom of Bosnia in 1463. |
| 1463 | 1465 | Sede vacante | |
| 1465 | 1466 | Demetrije Čupor | |
| 1468 | unknown | Benedikt III Levey | |
| 1486 | 1489 | Matija de Warda | |
| 1489 | 1491 | Stjepan od Velike Luke | |
| 1491 | 1493 | Luka | Also recorded as Lucas Szegedi, Chief Justice of Hungary (1502–1503), bishop of Zagreb (1500–1510). |
| 1493 | 1501 | Gabrijel Polgar | Dominican friar, also recorded as Polner or Polver. |
16th century
| From | Until | Incumbent | Notes |
| 1501 | 1516 | Mihalj Kešerić de Chybarth | |
| c. 1516 | unknown | Donat a Turre | Also recorded as Donato della Torre. |
| 1524 | 1526 | Juraj II Paližna | |
| 1526 | 1533 | Sede vacante | |
| 1533 | | Bernard Gentilis | |
| 1533 | 1573 | Sede vacante | |
| 1573 | 1583 | Anto Matković | Franciscan friar, also recorded as Antonio Poli de Mathaeis. |
| 1583 | 1588 | Sede vacante | |
| 1588 | 1615 | Franjo Baličević | Franciscan friar |
17th century
| From | Until | Incumbent | Notes |
| 1615 | 1625 | Anto Matić Požežanin | |
| 1625 | 1631 | Sede vacante | |
| 1631 | 1635 | Ivan IV Tomko Mrnavić | |
| 1635 | 1639 | Sede vacante | |
| 1639 | 1644 | Toma V Mrnavić | |
| 1645 | 1660 | Marijan Maravić | |
| 1660 | 1669 | Sede vacante | |
| 1669 | 1701 | Nikola III Ogramić | Franciscan friar. Lived and ruled in Bosnia for a while. Murdered on August 14, 1701. |
18th century
| From | Until | Incumbent | Notes |
| 1701 | 1703 | Sede vacante | |
| 1703 | | Petar III Stanko Crnković | |
| 1703 | 1716 | Đuro Patačić od Zajezda | Also recorded as Juraj III. Patačić, ordered the construction of the new bishop's residence and new cathedral. He had convened the first synod of the Diocese of Bosnia in Đakovo. |
| 1716 | 1749 | Petar IV Bakić de Lach | |
| 1749 | 1751 | Franjo III Thauzy | Translated to Kalocsa |
| 1751 | 1773 | Josip Antun Ćolnić | |
On July 9, 1773 Diocese of Bosnia was united with Diocese of Sirmio

== Sources ==
- Opći šematizam Katoličke crkve u Jugoslaviji 1974 (in Croatian). Zagreb: Bishops' Conference of Yugoslavia. 1975.
- Povijest Bosne i Hercegovine od najstarijih vremena do godine 1463 (in Croatian). Vol. I. Sarajevo: HKD Napredak. 1998.
- Šanjek, Franjo (1996). Kršćanstvo na hrvatskom prostoru. Pregled religiozne povijesti Hrvata (7.-20. st.) (in Croatian). Zagreb: Kršćanska sadašnjost.
- Krešić, Milenko (2016). "O biskupima stonskim, trebinjskim i bosanskim u okviru Dubrovačke metropolije do 30-ih godina 14. stoljeća i staroslavenskoj službi Božjoj u njihovim biskupijama". Vrhbosnensia. 20 (1). University of Sarajevo, Catholic Theological Faculty: 103–123.

=== Further reading ===
- Magyar katolikus lexikon I–XV. Főszerk. Diós István; szerk. Viczián János. Budapest: Szent István Társulat. 1993–2010., list of bishops:
- Grbešić, Grgo (2023). "Povijesni pregled Bosanske biskupije i utemeljenje Đakovačko-osječke nadbiskupije". Diacovensia. 31 (2): 267–290. doi:10.31823/d.31.2.6.
- Tóth, Ildikó (2007). "Kaptol na južnoj granici (područni djelokrug Bosanskoga stolnog kaptola do sredine 14. st.)". Zbornik Muzeja Đakovštine. 8 (1): 207–224.
