= Amilcare Porporato =

Italian-American engineer

Amilcare M. Porporato is an Italian-American engineer. As of 2018 he is Thomas J. Wu ’94 Professor at Princeton University.

From 2014 to 2017 he was the Addy Professor of Civil and Environmental Engineering at Duke University and an Elected Fellow of American Geophysical Union. His current concerns are earth sciences and its relationships and systems.

Porporato obtained a master's equivalent in civil engineering from the Polytechnic University of Turin, Italy, in 1992 and a Ph.D. at the Polytechnic University of Milan, Italy, in 1996. From 1995 to 2001, Porporato was an assistant professor at Turin's Department of Hydraulics, Transport and Civil Infrastructure, interrupted by a postdoc stint in 1998 when he went to Texas A&M University as a research associate in the Environmental and Water Resources Division, and a year in Princeton as visiting scholar. In 2001 Turin promoted him to associate professor, and in 2004 Porporato was hired by Duke.
