= Peter Siklósi =

Hungarian bishop

Peter Siklósi (Hungarian: Siklósi Péter, Serbo-Croatian: Petar Sikloši, Петар Сиклоши; died on 3 January 1379) was a Hungarian bishop.

Peter served as cleric in the Slavonian town of Đakovo, the residence of the bishops of Bosnia since they were exiled from Bosnia itself in the previous century. Peter was chosen to succeed the Franciscan Peregrin Saxon on the episcopal throne following the latter's death in January 1356. The relations between the Ban of Bosnia and the Bishop of Bosnia had never been better during Peregrin's episcopate, but deteriorated again once Peter took over. Peter was one more in the series of absent bishops whose authority was eclipsed by Bosnian Franciscans.

When relations between Tvrtko I of Bosnia and Louis I of Hungary worsened, Peter took Louis's side. He actively supported the calls for a new crusade against Bosnia, earning him Tvrtko's hostility. The Ban even attempted to plot against him, corresponding to that end with a lector in Đakovo. Peter discovered the letters and had the lector imprisoned. Peter and Tvrtko apparently settled their differences, since Peter officiated at the wedding of Tvrtko and Dorothea of Bulgaria in 1374, after which Tvrtko awarded him large tracts of land in Posavina. That same year, Peter was transferred to the Diocese of Győr.

== Sources ==
- Ćirković, Sima (1964). Istorija srednjovekovne bosanske države (in Serbo-Croatian). Srpska književna zadruga.
- Fine, John Van Antwerp Jr. (2007). The Bosnian Church: Its Place in State and Society from the Thirteenth to the Fifteenth Century. Saqi. ISBN 978-0-86356-503-8.
- Neumann, Tibor (2007). "Péter püspök és rokonsága. Az első Szapolyaiak [Bishop Peter and his Family. The first Szapolyais]". In Makk, Ferenc; Piti, Ferenc (eds.). Acta Universitatis Szegediensis. Acta Historica (in Hungarian). MTA-SZTE-MOL Magyar Medievisztikai Kutatócsoport. pp. 59–70.

Catholic Church titles
Preceded by Peregrin Saxon	Bishop of Bosnia; 1356–1376	Succeeded by Dominic
Preceded by John de Surdis	Bishop of Győr; 1376–1377	Succeeded by William
Preceded by Ladislaus Déméndi	Bishop of Veszprém; 1377–1379	Succeeded by Benedict Himfi
