= Peregrin Saxon =

Peregrin Saxon (Serbo-Croatian: Peregrin Saksonac/Перегрин Саксонац; died on 28 January 1356), also called Peregrin of Saxony, was the first vicar of Bosnia, later becoming Archbishop-elect of Split and Bishop of Bosnia.

== Vicar ==
Peregrin was a Franciscan friar who became a friend of Stephen II, Ban of Bosnia, giving much influence to the order in the country otherwise notorious for its autonomous (and deemed heretical) Bosnian Church. The vicariate was established by Gerard Odonis with Stephen's approval in 1340, and although Peregrin is first mentioned as vicar in 1344, it is clear that he had been installed earlier. Stephen, who became Catholic in the 1340s, praised Peregrin's work on behalf of the Roman Catholic Church to the papacy and requested that the vicar be allowed to summon more monks from various orders to help him. Stephen insisted that the monks sent to Bosnia "know Slavic or at least have the aptitude to learn it", as Peregrin had diligently done and demanded from other missionaries.

Peregrin led the construction of monasteries throughout Bosnia, from Mile (near Visoko) to Kraljeva Sutjeska, Olovo, Srebrenica, and more. In 1346 Pope Clement VI allowed him to construct two monasteries outside Bosnia, in Ston and Đakovo, for the monks to rest and recover. Involving himself with spiritual as well as secular issues in Bosnia, Peregrin functioned as a chancellor to the Ban. He assisted Stephen in his efforts to conclude an alliance with Serbia and Venice against Hungary, and was so influential that Venetian authorities instructed their ambassadors to Bosnia to explain their missions to him before approaching the ruler.

== Bishop ==
When the Archbishop of Split Domenico Luccari died in 1348, the chapter elected Peregrin as his successor. Stephen, however, was determined to keep Peregrin in Bosnia. Taking advantage of the recent vacancy of the Diocese of Bosnia, the Ban asked the government of the Republic of Venice to intervene with the Holy See and recommend his trusted vicar as the next bishop. This way he also wanted to prevent disputes over tithes and authority between the bishopric, with its seat in the Croatian town of Đakovo, and the vicariate, members of which were actually active in Bosnia. Pope Clement VI had already named a bishop, John, but accepted the Ban's suggestion, and Peregrin was named Bishop of Bosnia on 28 January 1349. Peregrin was the first Bishop of Bosnia to have been to Bosnia since the 1230s. Stephen II died in 1353, and Peregrin maintained close relations with his successor, Tvrtko I, who called him his "spiritual father". Although Peregrin's ordination as Bishop of Bosnia solved the problem of division of authority, after his death on 28 January 1356, Pope Innocent VI did not select a Franciscan again, and the institutions were once more separated.

Peregrin is considered one of the most important men in the history of Roman Catholicism in Bosnia and Herzegovina. He is buried in the Franciscan monastery of Đakovo. Immediately after his death the Franciscans of his native Saxony included him among the beatified people of their province, and he is now revered by all members of the order.

Catholic Church titles
New title	Vicar of Bosnia; 1340–1349	Succeeded by Martin of Asti
Preceded by Domenico Luccari	Archbishop-elect of Split; 1348	Succeeded by Ugolino de Malabranca
Preceded by John II	Bishop of Bosnia; 1349–1356	Succeeded by Peter Siklósi
