= Frang Bardhi =

Albanian Roman Catholic bishop (1606–1643)

Most Reverend Frang Bardhi
- Bishop of Sapë
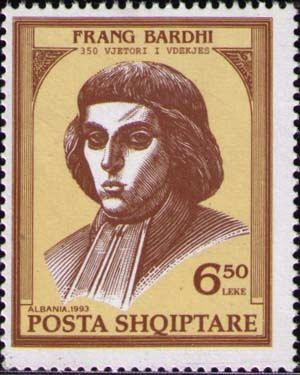
- Frang Bardhi on a 1993 Albanian stamp
- Church: Catholic Church
- In office: 1635–1644
- Predecessor: Gjergj Bardhi
- Successor: Gjergj Bardhi

Orders
- Consecration: 30 Mar 1636 by Ciriaco Rocci

Personal details
- Born: 1606 Kallmet or Nënshat, Ottoman Empire (modern-day Albania)
- Died: 1643 (aged 36–37)

Frang Bardhi (Latin: Franciscus Blancus, Italian: Francesco Bianchi, 1606–1643) was an Albanian Catholic bishop and Old Albanian author from the Renaissance. Bardhi is best known as an author of the early eras of Albanian literature. He served as Bishop of Sapë (1635–1644).

== Life ==
Bardhi was born in Kallmet or Nënshat in the northern Albanian Zadrima region near Lezhë. He came from a family consisting of many figures high in the hierarchy of the Catholic Church and state officials or military commanders of the Republic of Venice. His uncle was the Bishop of Sapa and Sarda. He studied theology in Italy. On 17 December 1635, during the papacy of Pope Urban VIII, Bardhi was appointed Bishop of Sapë. On 30 March 1636, he was consecrated bishop by Ciriaco Rocci, Cardinal-Priest of San Salvatore in Lauro, with Giovanni Battista Altieri, Bishop Emeritus of Camerino, and Ottavio Broglia, Bishop of Asti, serving as co-consecrators.

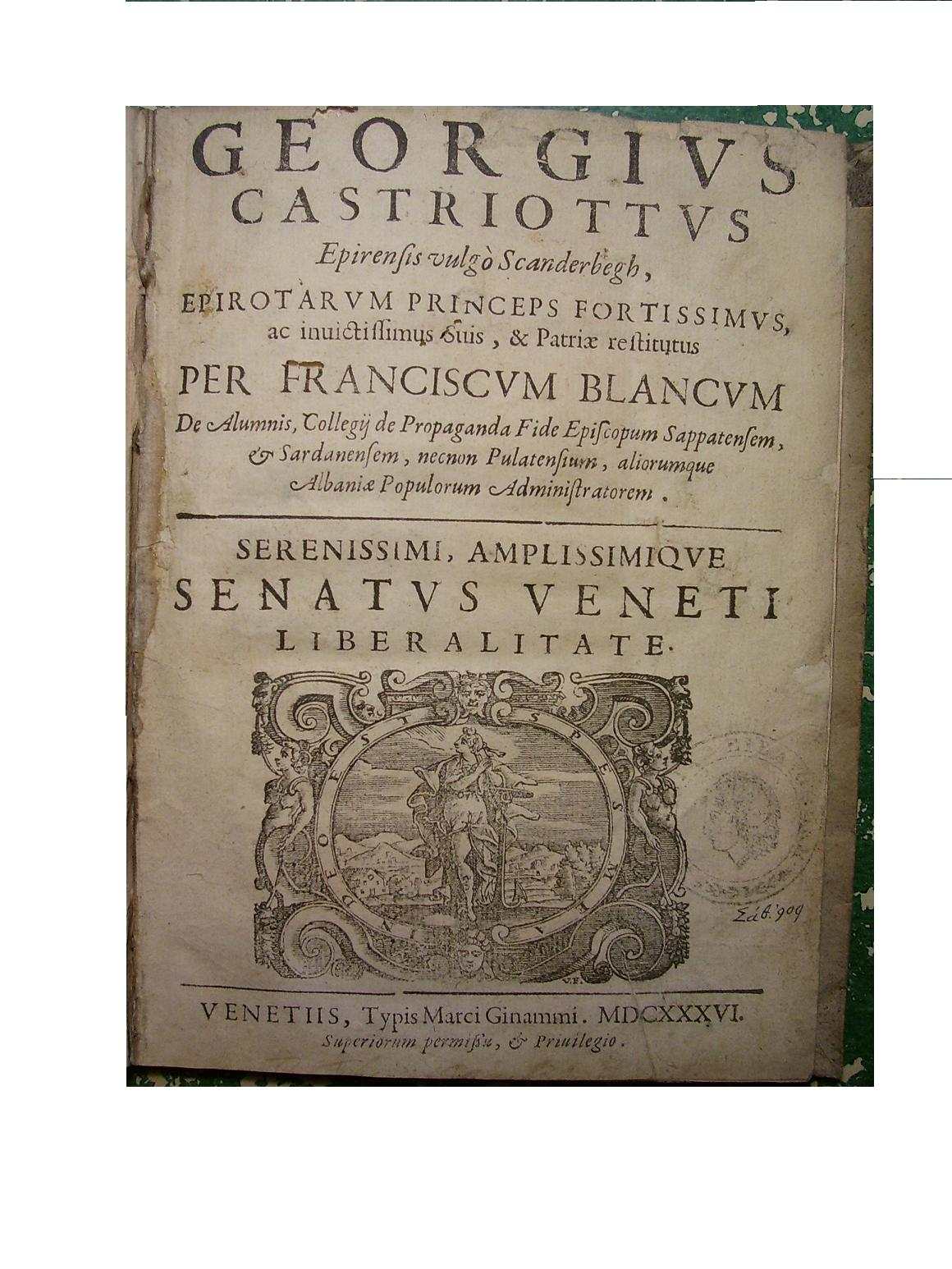
The title page of the Apology of Scanderbeg

Bardhi is remembered as the author of the first Albanian dictionary, Dictionarium latino-epiroticum (Latin-Albanian dictionary), published in Rome in 1635, comprising 5,640 entries. Its appendix contains a list of 113 proverbs, phrases and idioms, some of which are translations from other languages into Albanian, with the vast majority being collected from the Albanian folklore.

Bardhi also wrote a biography of Skanderbeg, called The Apology of Scanderbeg, published in Venice in 1636. The Apology of Scanderbeg was a polemic against the Slavic Catholic priest Ivan Tomko Mrnavić, who claimed that Kastrioti was of Slav origin. Bardhi also complained that the Albanian language "was being lost and degenerating" under the blows of foreign occupiers, and in order to preserve it, he saw himself contributing to the missing of national pride among Albanians.

From 1637 on, Bardhi submitted reports in Italian and Latin to the Congregation of the Propaganda Fide in Rome, which contain a mine of information about his diocese, political developments, Albanian customs and the structure and position of the Catholic Church in Ottoman Albania.

== See also ==
- Bardhi family name
- Pjetër Budi
- Pjetër Bogdani
- Gjon Buzuku

Catholic Church titles
Preceded by Giorgio Bianchi	Bishop of Sapë; 1635–1644	Succeeded by Giorgio Bianchi
