= Gjergj Bardhi =

17th-century Albanian Roman Catholic Prelate

- Born: 1575; Zadrima region
- Died: 1646 (aged 70–71); Shkodër region

Gjergj Bardhi or Giorgio Bianchi, shortly called Grili, (1575 – 16 October 1646) was an Albanian prelate of the Roman Catholic Church.

== Life ==
Gjergj Bardhi was born in region of Zadrima, modern northern Albania in 1575. His family included several notable figures of Albanian history like Frang Bardhi, writer of the early eras of Albanian literature. In 1621 he became apostolic vicar of the Roman Catholic Diocese of Sapë in Albania. In Sapa he lived in the parish of Saint-Etienne. In 1623 he became bishop of the diocese of Zappa. In 1635 he was appointed Archbishop of Antivari. He served as apostolic administrator of Serbia from March to November 1644, when he was appointed again bishop of Sapa. Gjergj Bardhi died on October 16, 1646, in the area of modern Shkodër.

== See also ==
- Frang Bardhi
- Nikollë Bardhi
- Tosol Bardhi
