= Diocese of Saluzzo =

Roman Catholic diocese in Italy

Coordinates: 44.6500°N 7.4833°E

Diocese of Saluzzo Dioecesis Salutiarum

Catholic
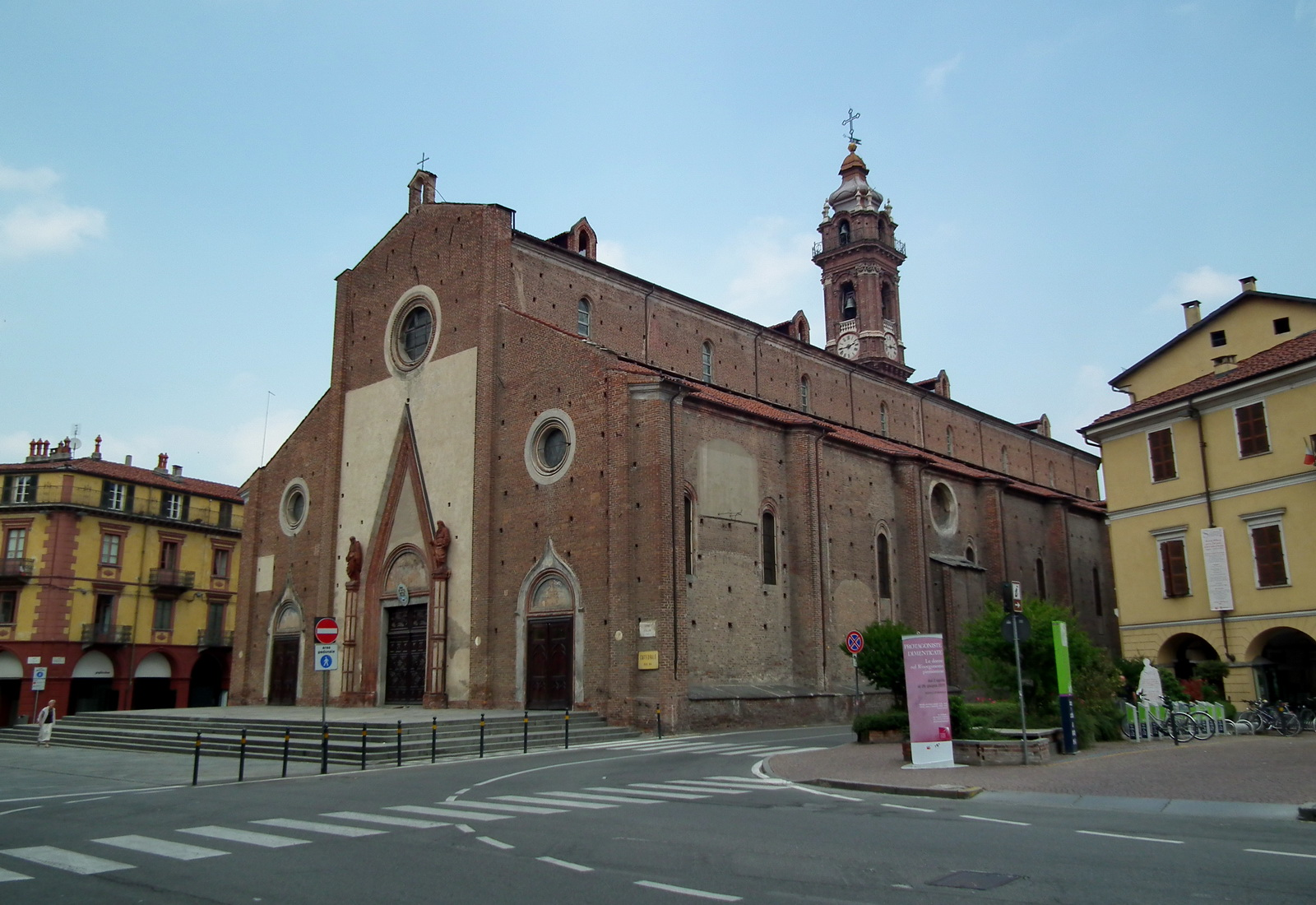
- Saluzzo Cathedral

Location
- Country: Italy
- Ecclesiastical province: Turin

Statistics
- Area: 1,815 km^{2} (701 sq mi)
- Population: Total; Catholics: (as of 2022); 96,800 (est.) ▼; 89,400 (guess) ▼
- Parishes: 90 ▼

Information
- Denomination: Catholic Church
- Rite: Roman Rite
- Established: 29 October 1511
- Cathedral: Cattedrale di Maria SS. Assunta
- Secular priests: 78 (diocesan) ▼10 (Religious Orders); 9 Permanent Deacons ▼

Current leadership
- Pope: Leo XIV
- Bishop: Cristiano Bodo
- Bishops emeritus: Giuseppe Guerrini

Map

Website
- Diocesi di Saluzzo (in Italian)

The Diocese of Saluzzo (Latin: Dioecesis Salutiarum) is a Latin diocese of the Catholic Church in the Piedmont region of northwestern Italy, centered in the comune of Saluzzo. The diocese was established on 29 October 1511 for political reasons, to transform the Marquisate of Saluzzo into an ecclesiastic territory, and was directly dependent upon the Holy See. It is now a suffragan of the Archdiocese of Turin.

== History ==
The diocese of Saluzzo was established by Pope Julius II on 29 October 1511, in his bull Pro excellenti.

The church selected for the new cathedral had formerly been the Church of S. Maria Assunta. In 1481 Count Lodovico II prevailed upon Pope Sixtus IV to establish the church as a Collegiate Church, headed by a Dean and six dignities (Archdeacon, Provost, Archpriest, Cantor, Precentor, Treasurer), with twelve Canons. The canonical establishment of the Collegiate Church was carried out by Cardinal Domenico della Rovere on 21 January 1483. As a cathedral, it was staffed by a Cathedral Chapter, which consisted of six dignities (including the Archdeacon, the Archpriest, the Provost, the Cantor, the Precentor and the Treasurer) and twelve additional Canons. The new Chapter collected its various regulations into a Statute book, which was confirmed by the new Bishop on 3 November 1516

A diocesan synod was opened on 3 August 1516 by Bishop Giuliano Tornabuoni (1516–1530). A set of statutes, containing eighty-seven clauses, was issued. Tornabuoni then went to Rome, to have Pope Leo X rule on some questions about civil and religious jurisdiction in the diocese of Saluzzo. But on 22 October 1517 he had already been appointed Castellan of the Castel S. Angelo, which required his continuing presence in Rome; he was still Castellan on 19 October 1521, according to the records of the Chapter of the cathedral of Saluzzo. Saluzzo was governed by his Vicar General, Filippo de Pistorio, and episcopal functions were delegated to Antonio Vacca, the titular Bishop of Nicomedia.

In 1522 the duchy of Saluzzo was attacked by forces of the Emperor Charles V, led by Pompeo Colonna, who were planning to invade Provence. The ducal family was forced to flee, and the town of Saluzzo was taken by the lances of the imperial army. In 1523 and again in 1525 the Marquisate was stricken by the plague. And on 20 February 1525 the whole of Piedmont suffered two large earthquakes.

A diocesan synod, the fifteenth, was held on 5—7 October 1954 by Bishop Egidio Luigi Lanza.

== Bishops of Saluzzo ==
=== from 1511 to 1698 ===
- Gianantonio della Rovere (1511–1512)
- Sisto Gara della Rovere (1512–1516)
- Giuliano Tornabuoni (1516–1530 Resigned)
- Alfonso Tornabuoni (1530–1546)
- Filippo Archinto (1546–1556)
- Gabriele Cesano (1556–1568)
- Giovanni Maria Tapparelli, O.P. (1568–1581)
- Giovanni Luigi Pallavicino Ceva (1581–1583)
- Antonio Francesco Pichot, O.S.B. (1583–1597)

Sede vacante (1597–1602)

- Giovanni Giovenale Ancina, C.O. (1602–1604 Died)

Sede vacante (1604–1608)

- Ottavio Viale (1608–1624)

[Agappino Solano de' Conti di Moretta]

- Giacomo Marenco (1627–1634)
- Pietro Bellino (1636–1641 Died)
- Francesco Agostino della Chiesa (1642–1662)
- Carlo Piscina (1664–1668 Died)
- Nicola Lepori, O.P. (1668–1686)
- Michael Ludovicus Tevenardi, O.P. (1688–1697 Died)

=== from 1698 to 1901 ===
- Carlo Giuseppe Morozzo, O. Cist. (1698–1729)
- Giovanni Battista Lomellini, O.P. (1729–1733)

Sede vacante (1733 or 1735 – 1741)

- Giuseppe Filippo Porporato (1741–1781 Died)
- Giuseppe Gioacchino Lovera (1783–1799 Died)
- Giuseppe Francesco Maria Ferraris da Genola (1800)
- Teresio Maria Carlo Vittorio Ferrero della Marmora (1805–1824 Resigned)

Sede vacante (1824–1828)

- Antonio Podestà (1828–1836)
- Giovanni Antonio Gianotti (Giannotti) (1837–1863)

Sede vacante (1863–1867)

- Lorenzo Gastaldi (1867–1871)
- Alfonso Buglione di Monale (1871–1894)
- Mattia Vicario (1895–1901 Appointed, Bishop of Novara)

=== since 1900 ===
- Giovanni Oberti, Sch. P. (1901–1942)
- Egidio Luigi Lanzo, O.F.M. Cap. (1943–1973)
- Antonio Fustella (1973–1986)
- Sebastiano Dho (1986–1993 Appointed, Bishop of Alba Pompea)
- Diego Natale Bona (1994–2003)
- Giuseppe Guerrini (2003–2016 Retired)
- Cristiano Bodo (17 Dec 2016– )

== Parishes ==
Ninety of the diocese’s 91 parishes are in the province of Cuneo in south-west Piedmont; the last is in the neighbouring province of Turin.

== Bibliography ==
=== References ===
- Gams, Pius Bonifatius (1873). Series episcoporum Ecclesiae catholicae: quotquot innotuerunt a beato Petro apostolo. Ratisbon: Typis et Sumptibus Georgii Josephi Manz. p. 821. (in Latin)
- Eubel, Conradus); Gulik, Guilelmus (1923). Hierarchia catholica. Vol. 3 (second ed.). Münster: Libreria Regensbergiana.
- Gauchat, Patritius (Patrice) (1935). Hierarchia catholica. Vol. IV (1592-1667). Münster: Libraria Regensbergiana.
- Ritzler, Remigius; Sefrin, Pirminus (1952). Hierarchia catholica medii et recentis aevi. Vol. V (1667-1730). Patavii: Messagero di S. Antonio.
- Ritzler, Remigius; Sefrin, Pirminus (1958). Hierarchia catholica medii et recentis aevi VI (1730-1799). Patavii: Messagero di S. Antonio.
- Ritzler, Remigius; Sefrin, Pirminus (1968). Hierarchia Catholica medii et recentioris aevi sive summorum pontificum, S. R. E. cardinalium, ecclesiarum antistitum series... A pontificatu Pii PP. VII (1800) usque ad pontificatum Gregorii PP. XVI (1846) (in Latin). Vol. VII. Monasterii: Libr. Regensburgiana.
- Remigius Ritzler; Pirminus Sefrin (1978). Hierarchia catholica Medii et recentioris aevi... A Pontificatu PII PP. IX (1846) usque ad Pontificatum Leonis PP. XIII (1903) (in Latin). Vol. VIII. Il Messaggero di S. Antonio.
- Pięta, Zenon (2002). Hierarchia catholica medii et recentioris aevi... A pontificatu Pii PP. X (1903) usque ad pontificatum Benedictii PP. XV (1922) (in Latin). Vol. IX. Padua: Messagero di San Antonio. ISBN 978-88-250-1000-8.

=== Studies ===
- Bima, Palemone Luigi (1842). Serie cronologica dei Romani Pontefici e degli Arcivescovi e Vescovi di tutti gli stati di Sardegna. 2. ed (in Italian) (seconda ed.). Torino: Fratelli Favale. pp. 84–88.
- Cappelletti, Giuseppe (1858). Le chiese d'Italia: dalla loro origine sino ai nostri giorni (in Italian). Vol. decimoquarto (XIV). Venice: G. Antonelli.
- Chiattone, Domenico (1903). I primi vescovi di Saluzzo nel '500 (in Italian). Saluzzo: Tip. Vescovile S. Vincenzo.
- Della Chiesa, Francesco Agostino (1645). S. R. E. Cardinalium, Archiepiscoporum, Episcoporum et Abbatum Pedemontanae Regionis ... historia (in Latin). Turin: Giovanni Domenico Tarini. pp. 109–131.
- Mola, Aldo Alessandro (2001). Saluzzo: un'antica capitale (in Italian). Roma: Newton & Compton. ISBN 978-88-8289-634-8.
- Savio, Carlo Fedele; Patrucco, C.; Durando E. and Chiattone, D. (1901). Studi e documenti sul duomo di Saluzzo e su altre chiese nell'antico marchesato. Biblioteca della Società Storica Subalpina, XVIII (in Italian). Pinerolo: Chiantore-Mascareli.
- Savio, Carlo Fedele (1911). Storia di Saluzzo dal XVe al XIXe secolo (in Italian). Vol. I. Saluzzo: Editoriale Rosso.
- Savio, Carlo Fedele (1911). Saluzzo e i suoi vescovi, 1475-1601. Saluzzo: Fratelli Lobeto Bodoni. (in Italian)
- Rovera, Giovanni; Bessone, Carlo (1997). Il Duomo di Saluzzo. Savigliano : L'artistica Savigliano, 1997. (in Italian)
- Ughelli, Ferdinando; Coleti, Niccolò (1717). Italia sacra sive De Episcopis Italiae, et insularum adjacentium (in Latin). Vol. Tomus primus. Venice: apud Sebastianum Coleti. pp. 1225–1234.
