= Sapë =

Medieval city in modern Albania

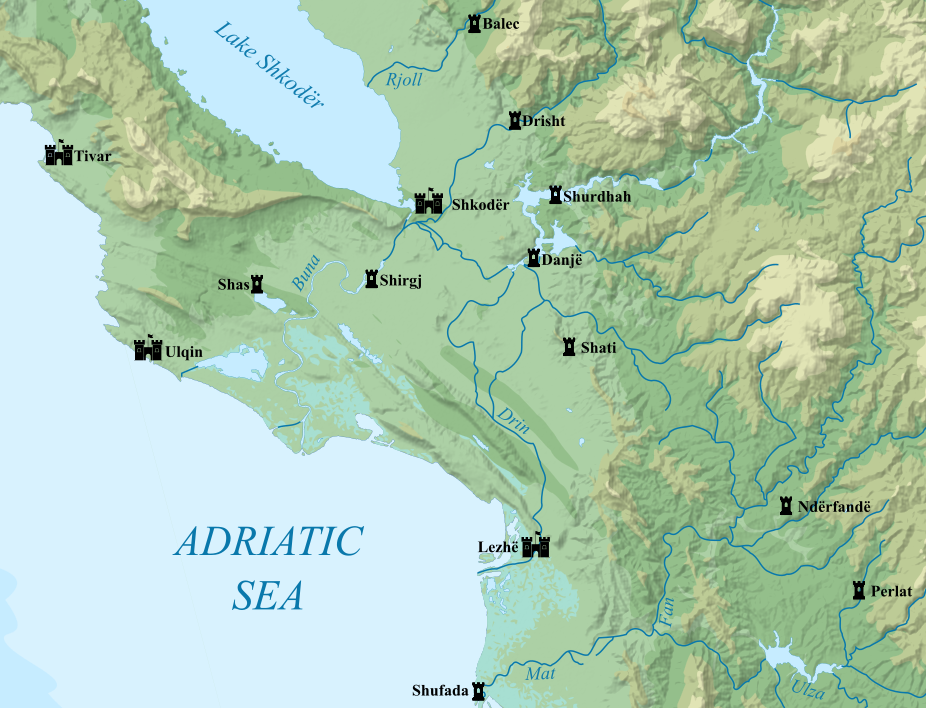
Sapë (Sapa) and nearby towns

Sapë (Latin: Sapa) was a medieval fortress, located near the village of Nënshat, in the municipality of Vau i Dejës (belonging to Shkodër County, in modern Albania). It is attested since the 13th century, situated in the historical region of Zadrima. In 1291, dowager-queen Jelena of Serbia (d. 1314), while governing the region, petitioned Pope Nicholas IV (1288-1292) and secured the creation of the Roman Catholic Diocese of Sapë, under the jurisdiction of the Roman Catholic Archdiocese of Bar. By the end of the 15th century, the region was conquered by the Ottoman Empire, and Sapë went into decline, and consequently into ruin. Today, only modest remains of the old fortress are preserved.

== Sources ==
- Brunga, Liza (2018). "The Medieval Churches in the Diocesan Centre of the Sape". Anglisticum Journal. 7 (8): 58–72.
- Elsie, Robert (2001). A Dictionary of Albanian Religion, Mythology and Folk Culture. London: Hurst & Company.
