= Roman Catholic Diocese of Sapë =

Latin Catholic ecclesiastical territory in Albania

Coordinates: 42.0074°N 19.6406°E

Diocese of Sapë Dioecesis Sappensis Dioqeza e Sapës

Catholic
- Coat of arms

Location
- Country: Albania
- Ecclesiastical province: Shkodër-Pult

Statistics
- Area: 2,544 km^{2} (982 sq mi)
- Population: Total; Catholics: (as of 2014); 202,800; 70,701 (34.9%)
- Parishes: 32

Information
- Denomination: Catholic
- Sui iuris church: Latin Church
- Rite: Roman Rite
- Established: 1062
- Cathedral: Cathedral of Blessed Teresa of Calcutta in Vau i Dejës
- Secular priests: 19

Current leadership
- Pope: Leo XIV
- Bishop: Vacant
- Metropolitan Archbishop: Angelo Massafra

Map
- Diocese of Sapë

The Diocese of Sapë (Latin: Dioecesis Sappensis, Albanian: Dioqeza e Sapës) is a Latin Church ecclesiastical territory or diocese of the Catholic Church in Northern Albania. It is a suffragan diocese in the ecclesiastical province of the metropolitan Archdiocese of Shkodër-Pult.

The diocese is named after the town of Sapë (Sappa), which is located near the Drin, southeast of Lake Scutari. However, the cathedral of the diocese is Katedralja e Nënë Terezja, in the town of Vau-Dejës, Shkodër County. The former cathedral is Kisha e Shën Gjergjit, in Nënshat in the same county.

The diocese is one of six Catholic jurisdictions in Albania. It is located in the vicinity of Lake Scutari, at the river basin of Drin.

== Statistics and extent ==
As of 2014, it pastorally served 70,701 Catholics (34.9% of 202,800 total) on 2,544 km^{2} in 32 parishes with 19 priests (11 diocesan, 8 religious), 1 deacon, 60 lay religious (9 brothers, 51 sisters) and 2 seminarians.

The ecclesiastical students of this diocese are educated at the seminary of Scutari. The Diocese of Sappa also includes the Franciscan monastery at Troshan (Trosciani), where the Minorites have a "Collegium seraphicum" for their students of philosophy.

== History ==
The bishopric was established in 1062, by Pope Alexander II. During the 11th century, the diocese was located within Dioclea.

In 1491 Pope Innocent VIII joined to it the Bishopric of Sardë (Sardoniki), and the united sees were suffragans of the Archbishopric of Antivari until the end of the eighteenth century. The See of Sardë comprised also the Diocese of Dagnum (Daynum, Dagno, Danj; Daynensis), founded as suffragan of Antivari during the second half of the fourteenth century and united with Sarda by Pope Martin V in 1428. By the Albanian Council in 1703, the Bishop of Sappa obtained some parishes previously belonging to the Diocese of Pulati.

- Lost territory on 1890.12.30 to Territorial Abbacy of Shën Llezhri i Oroshit

The exact number of bishops of Sappa is unknown. The first Bishop of Sappa mentioned is Peter in c. 1291. Notable bishops of Sappa include Gjergj Bardhi and Lazër Vladanji later became Archbishops of Bar. Pjetër Zarishi was a secretary to the Bishop of Sappa.

== Episcopal ordinaries ==
Bishops of Sapë

- Pietro = Peter I (11 June 1291 – ????)
- Paolo = Paul (ca. 1370–1376?)
- Benevenuli = Benvenuto (2 July 1376 – ????)
- Peter II (Pjetër Zakaria) = Pietro Zaccaria (1395.05.04 – )
- Nicholas I (1414–????)
- Michael (March 1422 – ????)
- Peter III (1425–????)
- Peter IV (1431–????)
- Matthew (Mateo/Mateu Hermollaji) (1433–????)
- George I (1440–1451)
- Emmanuel (1460–????)
- Unknown (1472–????)
- Marinus I (Marin Suma) (1473–????)
- Gabriel I (1479–????)
- Blasius (1489–1490)
- Prodokimi (January 1490 – 1500)
- Peter V (Pjetër Stërbinja) (1501–1507)
- Dominic (Domingo García) (5 July 1508 – ????)
- Ambrosius (Ambrosius Montemini) (1512–????)
- George III (1513–????)
- Didak Fernandez (1514–????)
- John I (Juan Buenaventura de Valderrama) (3 September 1518 – 1520)
- Alphonse (Alfons Kavaçiri) (1521–????)
- Diocese ceased to function for 50 years for unknown reasons
- Theobald (Tossoli Blanco) (1582–????)
- George IV (Gjergj Palma) (1583–????)
- Nicholas II (Nikollë Bardhi) (1594–????)
- Simon I (Simon Gjeçi/Jeçi) (1620–1621)
- Peter VI (Pjetër Budi) (20 July 1621 – ????)
- George IV (Gjergj Bardhi) (1623–1635)
- Francis (Frang Bardhi) (1635–????)
- George IV (Gjergj Bardhi) (1644–1646)
- Simon II (Simeoni Suma) (1647–1670s)
- Stephen (Shtjefën Gaspari) (1675–????)
- Martin (Martin Jelić) (1682–????)
- George V (Gjergj Teodori) (1685–1705)
- Egidius (Egidio Quinto) (21 March 1707 – 8 February 1719)
- Marinus II (Marin Gjini) (1719–????)
- John II (Gjon Gallata) (1720–????)
- Basil (Vasil Lindi) (1738–1744)
- Lazarus I (Lazër Vladanji) (1746–1749)
- George (Gjergj Vladanji) (1750–1765)
- Nicholas III (25 August 1765 – 1791)
- John III (Gjon Logoreci) (2 April 1791 – 21 December 1794)
- Anthony (Anton/Ndoc Radovani) (1796–????)
- Marcus (Mark Negri) (1808–????)
- Alexander (Lekë Suma) (24 December 1825 – ????)
- Lazarus I (Lazër Vladanji) (1827 – 15 February 1830)
- Peter VII (Pjetër Borçi) (18 December 1829/13 February 1836) – ????)
- George VII (Gjergj Labella) (1844 – ????)
- Peter VIII (Pietro Severini) (26 November 1843/1 February 1845 – 7 November 1873)
- Julius (Giulio Marsili) (December 1873 – 12 August 1890)
- Lawrence (Lorenzo Petris de Dolammare) (5 August 1890 – 20 December 1892)
- Gabriel II (Gabriel Nev(r)iani) (10 January 1893 – 28 March 1900)
- Lazarus II (Lazër Mjeda) (10 November 1900 – 24 December 1904)
- Jacob (Jak(ë) Serreqi) (7 August/29 October 1905 – 14 April/22 April 1910)
- George VI (Gjergj Koleci) (21 September 1911 – 2 January 1928)
  - Gaspar (Gaspër Thaçi) (1928 – ca. 13 June 1928) – Apostolic Administrator
- Joseph (Zef Gjonali) (13 June/25 July 1928 – 9 October/30 October 1935)
- Nicholas IV (Nikollë Vinçenc Prennushi) (27 January/6 February 1936 – 26 June 1940)
- George VIII (Gjergj Volaj) (25 May/26 June 1940 – February 1947/3 February 1948)
- John IV (Gjon Kovaçi) (June 1950 – ????)
  - Francis II (Frano Illia) (25 April 1993 – 1997) – Apostolic Administrator
  - Angel (Angelo Massafra) (1997 – ca. 2000) – Apostolic Administrator
  - Dodë Gjergji (6 January 2000 – 23 November 2005) – Apostolic Administrator
- Dodë Gjergji (23 November 2005 – 12 December 2006)
- Lucian (Lucjan Avgustini) (12 December 2006 – 22 May 2016)
- Simon III (Simon Kulli) (15 June 2017 – 29 November 2025)

== See also ==
- List of Catholic dioceses in Albania
