= Antonio Trivulzio =

Antonio Trivulzio may refer to:

- Antonio Trivulzio, iuniore (died 1559), Italian Roman Catholic cardinal
- Antonio Trivulzio, seniore (1457–1508), Italian Roman Catholic cardinal
- Antonio Trivulzio (bishop) (died 1519), Italian Roman Catholic bishop
