= Basilica of San Fedele, Como =

Roman Catholic Basilica in Como, Italy

Coordinates: 45°48′35.12″N 9°5′4.66″E

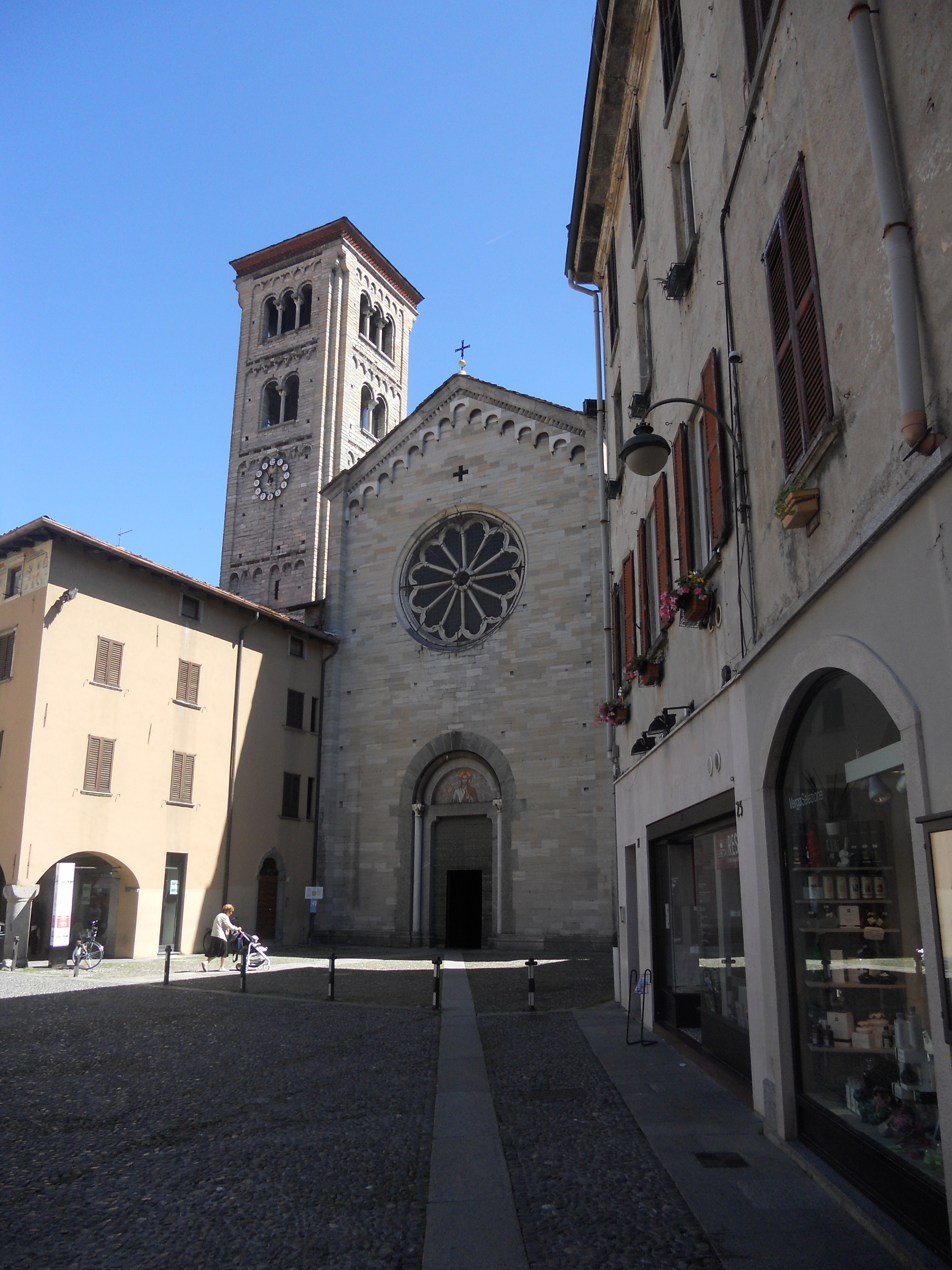

The Basilica of San Fedele in Como is located in the city center. The present Romanesque church dates from 1120 and is dedicated to the Fidelis of Como.

== History ==
The Basilica is located at what used to be the city's corn market and is dedicated to the martyr Saint Fidelis. It derives from an earlier Christian church, dating from the seventh century, dedicated to Euphemia. In 964, San Fedele’s relics were translated to the Church of St. Euphemia. They are kept inside the marble sarcophagus under the 14th century high altar. The dedication was changed to San Fedele, and the designation of cathedral passed to Santa Maria Maggiore.

The collegiate church was presided over by a Provost and seven canons.

The present Lombard Romanesque church dates from 1120. The campanile was rebuilt in 1271.

== Architecture ==
The neo-Romanesque facade was rebuilt and restored in 1914 by Antonio Giussani. It has a central renaissance rose window, below which opens the portal with a lunette and arch. The facade is not totally visible, partly hidden on the left by a leaning residential building.

The portal uprights are covered with sculptures. The right one has inside two dragons that compete for prey. It is likely this is from the portal of the church of Sant’Eufemia.

As the bell tower began to tilt over the years, it was demolished in 1905 and replaced.

== Interior ==
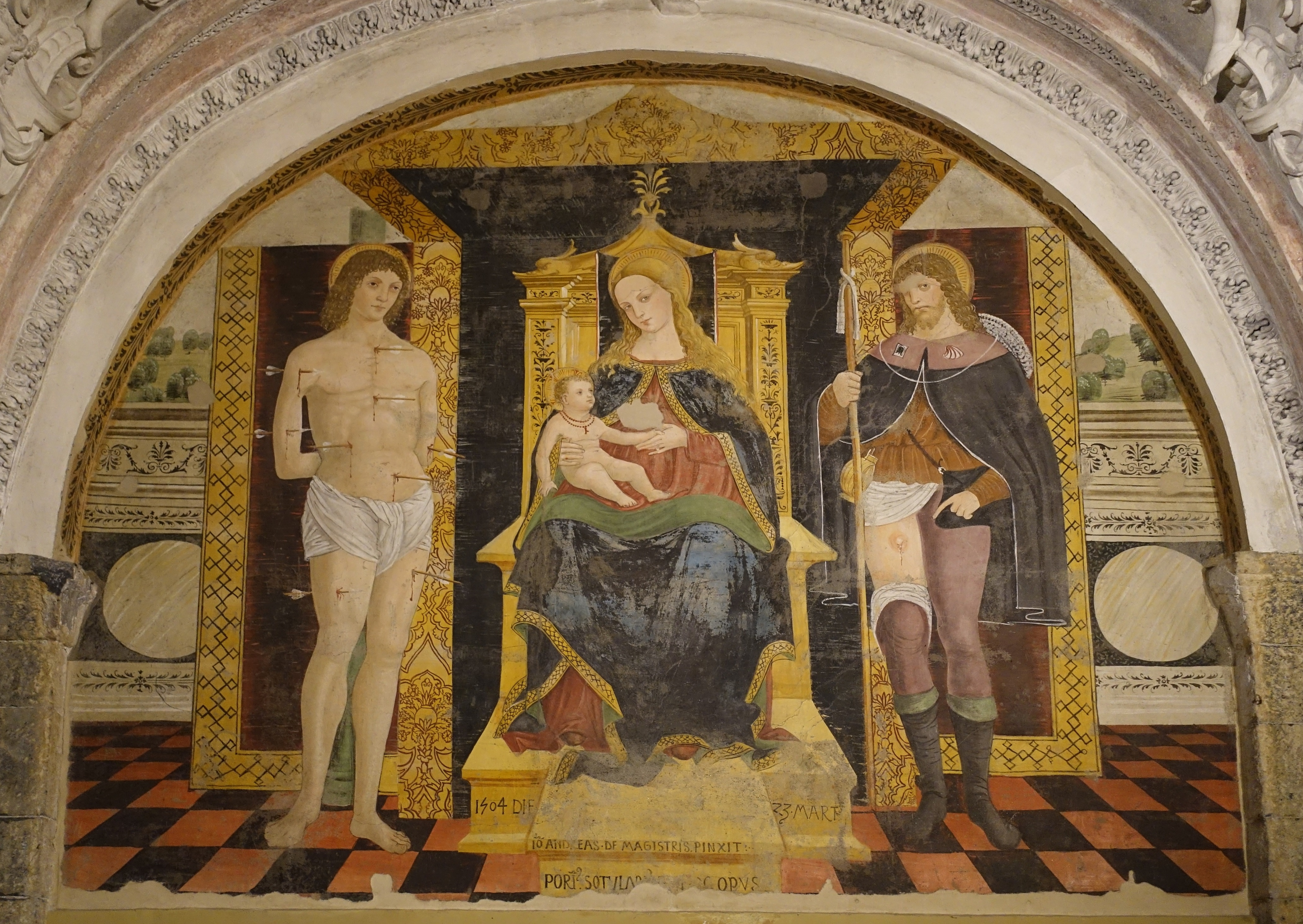
Madonna with SS. Sebastian and Roch

In the sixteenth century, the nave was covered with a barrel vault. The arches of the women’s galleries in the aisles were closed and replaced by pictures, paintings and stucco-works. In the right hand side aisle there is a triptych painted in 1504 by Giovanni Andrea De Magistris depicting the Blessed Virgin and the Infant Jesus between SS. Sebastian and Roch.

The interior contains a splendid Lombard Romanesque choir, resembling the Aachen Palatine Chapel. In 1773 a sacristy was constructed in place of the right apse.

=== Chapels ===
In the right transept is the Chapel of the Crucifix, where there is a fresco painted by Isidoro Bianchi in 1623. Four paintings with scenes of the Passion painted by Carlo Innocenzo Carloni complete the decoration of the chapel.

The relics of Amantius of Como, bishop of Comowere preserved at Sant'Abbondio until July 2, 1590, when they were transferred to the Chiesa del Gesù in Como. The relics were later transferred to the church of San Fedele in Como, where they remain today.

In the right transept, there is the chapel of the Blessed Virgin represented by a seventeenth-century statue in gilded wood. The bowl is painted with frescoes of the Assumption of the Virgin attributed to the painter Domenico Caresana and Francesco Carpano. At the sides of the altarpiece there are four seventeenth-century frescoes of the Marriage of the Virgin, the Nativity, the Annunciation to the Shepherds and the Adoration of the Magi.

The side chapels were constructed between 1807 and 1808. In 1807 the Chapel in the right aisle was completed. It is dedicated to Blessed Pope Innocent XI, a native of Como. The Chapel in the left aisle, dedicated to Saint Rita was created in 1808.

== Plan of the basilica ==
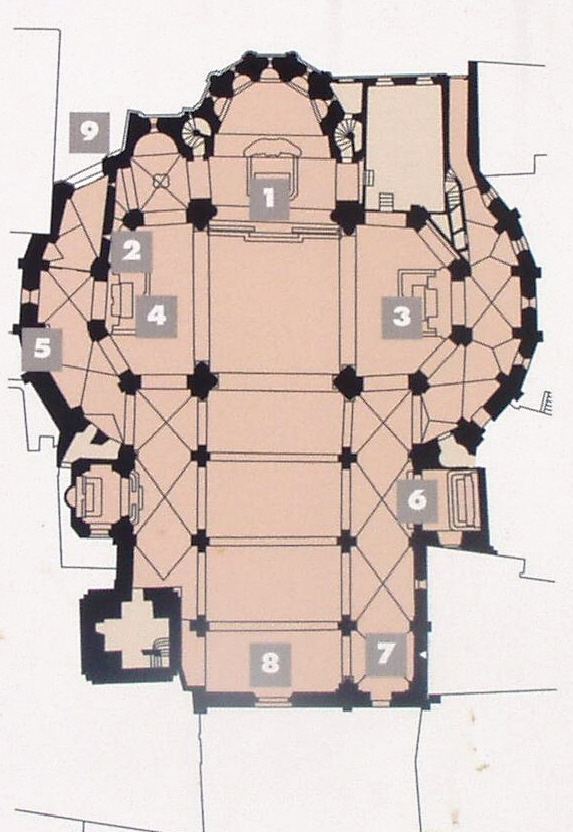
Ground plan

 1. Gothic arch of Saint Fidelis (1365);
 2. Votive frescoes (thirteenth-fourteenth centuries);
 3. Chapel of the Crucifix;
 4. Chapel of Mary;
 5. Altar of suffrage;
 6. Chapel of Innocent XI;
 7. Chapel of Mary of the Snow;
 8. Paintings and sculptures of the seventeenth and eighteenth centuries.

== Images ==
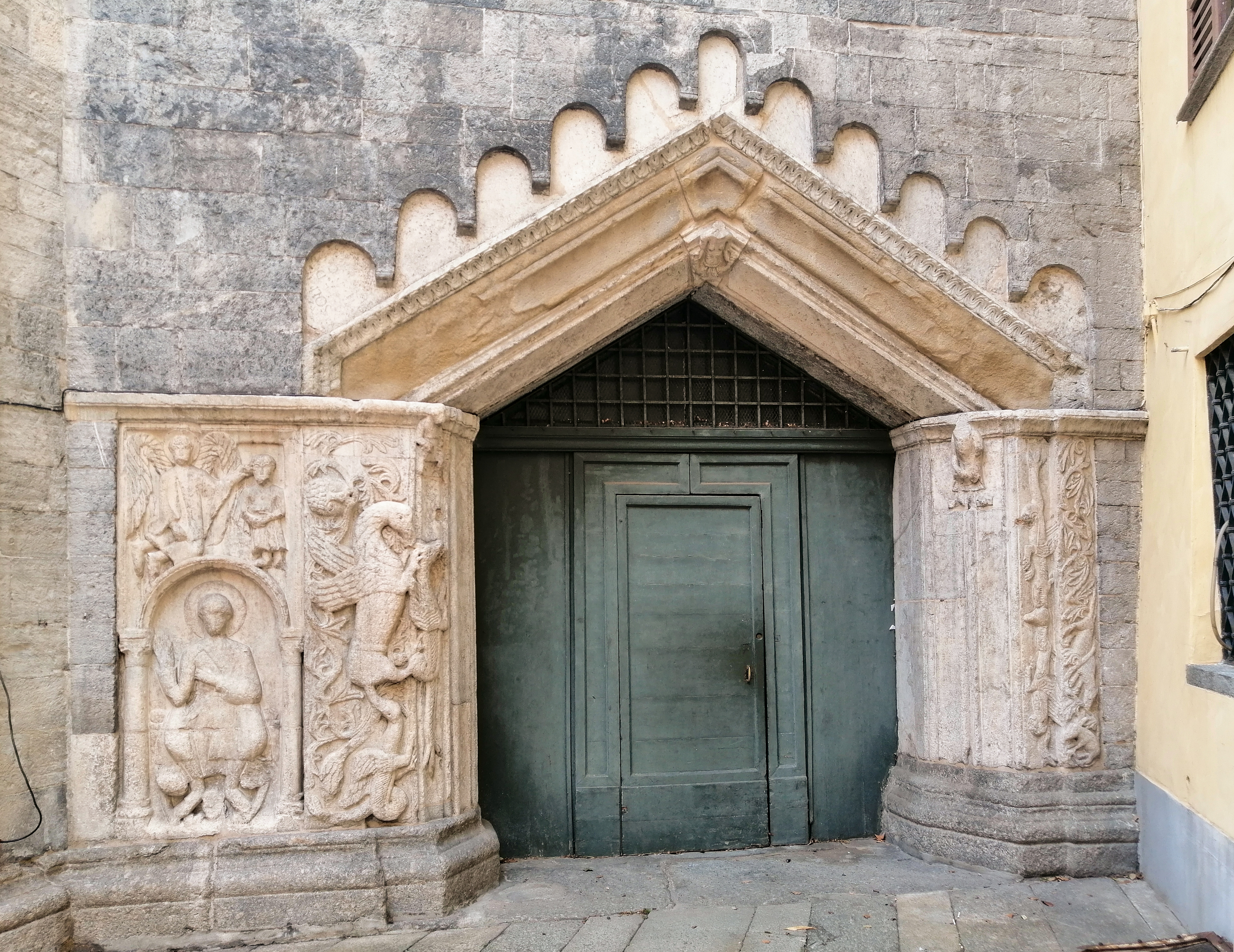
Dragon Portal with Comacine reliefs

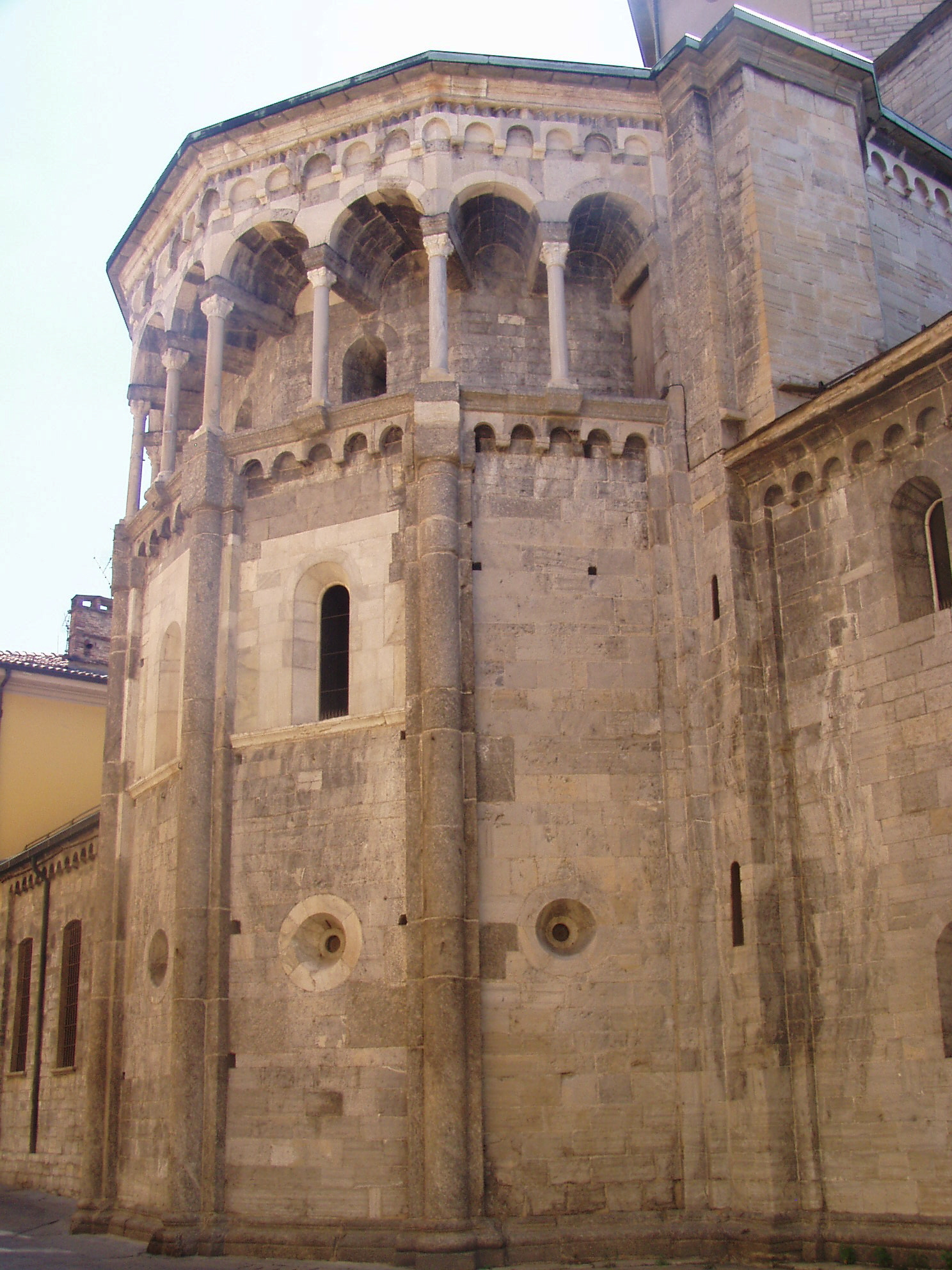
Apse from outside

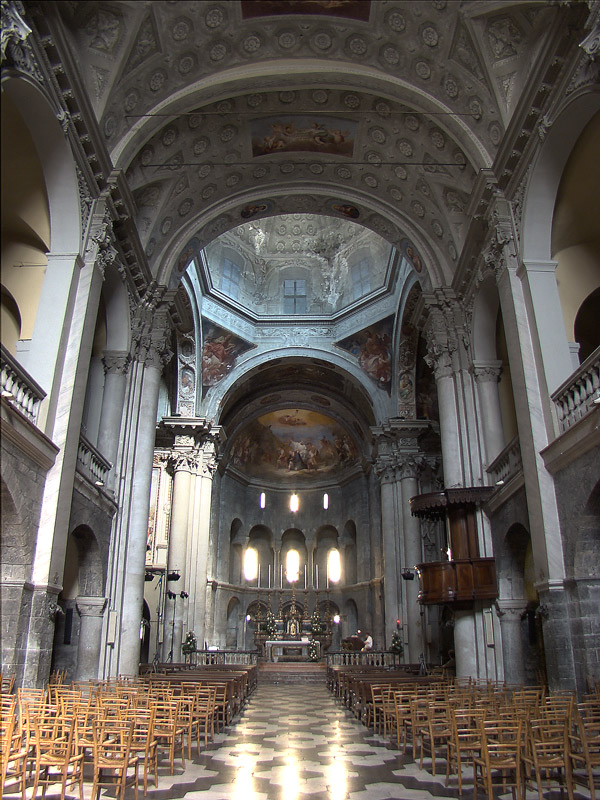
Nave

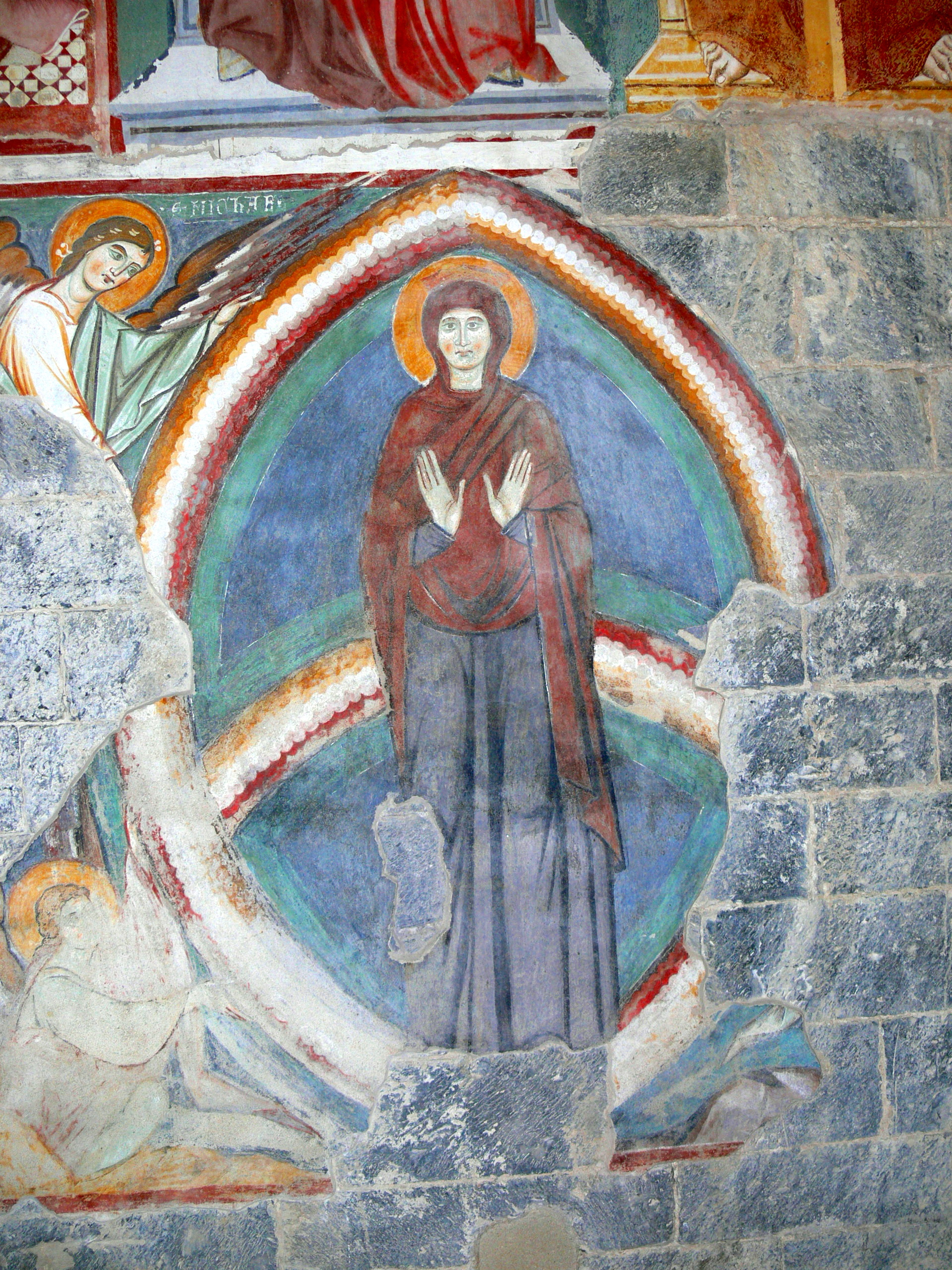
Madonna in Mandorla

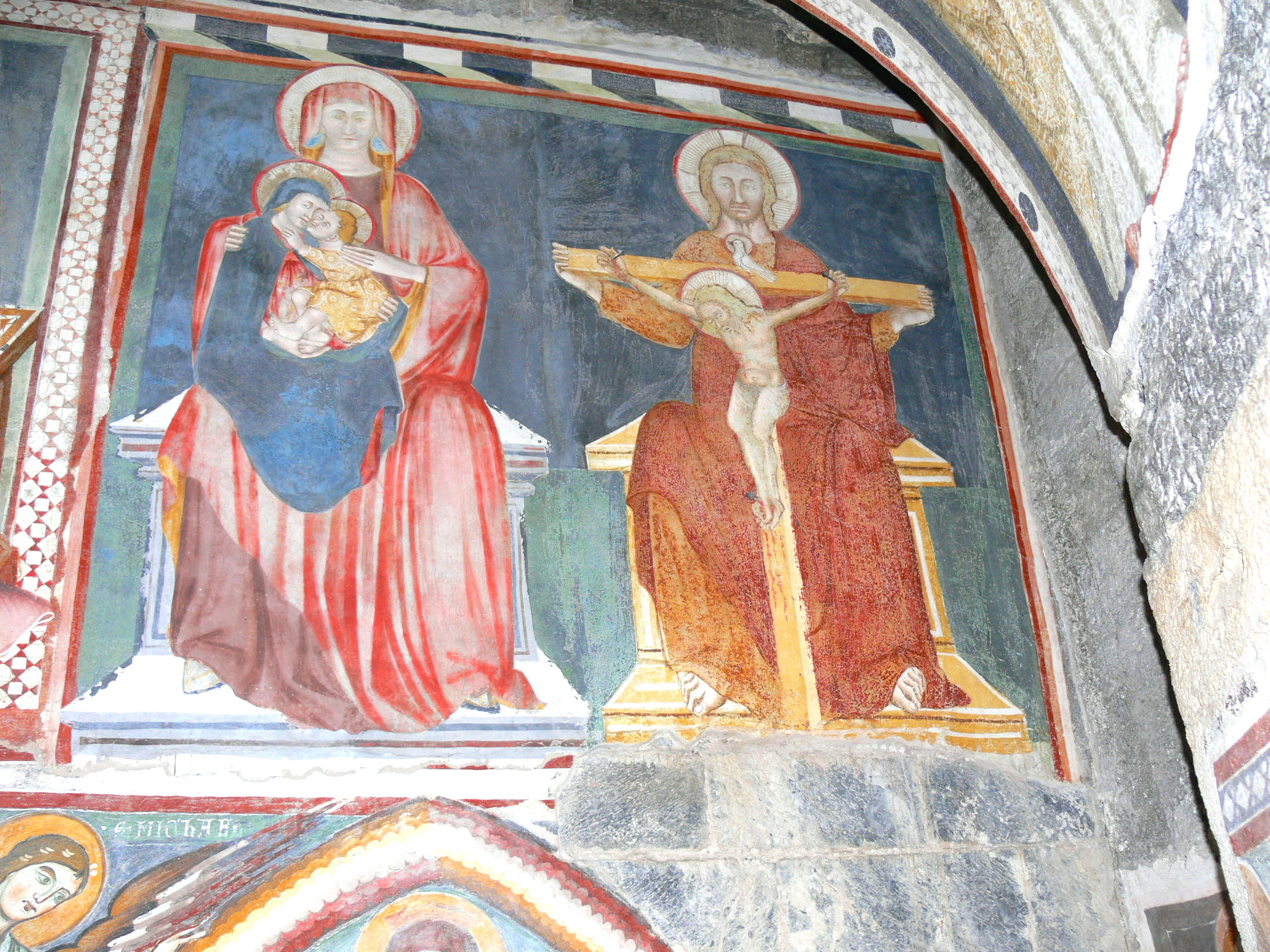
Madonna and Child with Saint Anne and Throne of Mercy

== See also ==
- High medieval domes
