= Migliavacca =

Migliavacca (pronounced [miʎʎaˈvakka]) is an Italian surname, originally a corruption of Magnavacca ('cow-eater'). Notable people with the surname include:

- Enrico Migliavacca (1901–1979), Italian association footballer and manager
- Giovanni Ambrogio Migliavacca (1718–1795), Italian poet and librettist
- Giuseppe Antonio Migliavacca (1849–1909), known as Arsenio da Trigolo, Italian Roman Catholic priest
- Innocenzo Migliavacca (1635–1714), Italian Roman Catholic prelate
- Maurizio Migliavacca (born 1951), Italian politician
