= Marco Antonio Tomati =

Marco Antonio Tomati may refer to:

- Marco Antonio Tomati (bishop of Asti) (???–1693), Italian Roman Catholic bishop
- Marco Antonio Tomati (bishop of Bitetto) (1591–1665), Italian Roman Catholic bishop
