= Branda Castiglioni =

Branda Castiglioni may refer to:

- Branda da Castiglione (1350–1443), Italian humanist, papal diplomat, and Roman Catholic pseudo-cardinal
- Brande Castiglioni (1415–1487), Italian Roman Catholic bishop
