= Diocese of Asti =

Roman Catholic diocese in Italy

Diocese of Asti Dioecesis Astensis

Catholic
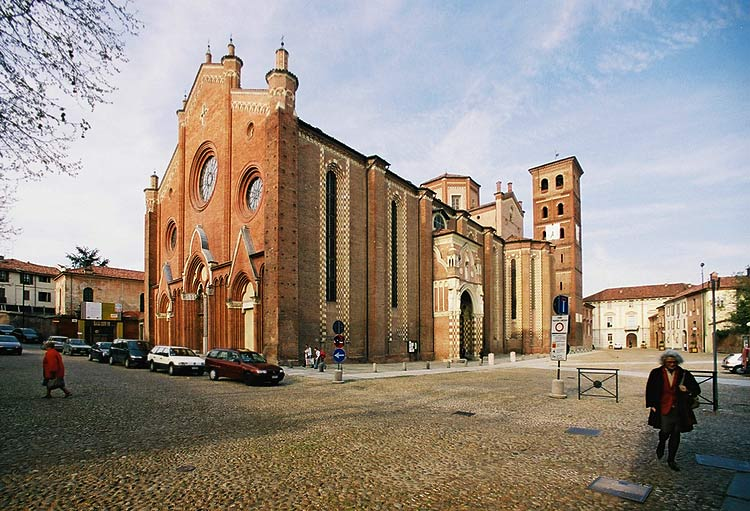
- Asti Cathedral

Location
- Country: Italy
- Ecclesiastical province: Turin

Statistics
- Area: 1,451 km^{2} (560 sq mi)
- Population: Total; Catholics: (as of 2015); 162,257; 152,000 (est.) (93.7%)
- Parishes: 126

Information
- Denomination: Catholic Church
- Rite: Roman Rite
- Established: 3rd century
- Cathedral: Cattedrale di S. Maria Assunta
- Secular priests: 94 (diocesan); 32 (Religious Orders); 12 Permanent Deacons

Current leadership
- Pope: Leo XIV
- Bishop: Marco Prestaro
- Bishops emeritus: Francesco Ravinale

Map

Website
- www.webdiocesi.chiesacattolica.it

The Diocese of Asti (Latin: Dioecesis Astensis) is a Latin diocese of the Catholic Church in Piedmont, northern Italy, centered in the city of Asti. It has been a suffragan of the Archdiocese of Turin since 1515. Previous to that, it was a suffragan of the Archdiocese of Milan.

The diocese lost territory in 1175, when the diocese of Alessandria was created. It lost a considerable amount of its ancient territory when the diocese of Mondovì was established in 1388 by Urban VI. It lost territory again when the diocese of Casale was created in 1474, and again in 1511 at the creation of the diocese of Saluzzo. In 1592 the diocese of Fossano was assigned more of Asti's territory.

== History ==
There has been some controversy as to the beginning of the Diocese of Asti and the episcopate of St. Evasius, once placed by some at much earlier dates. The diocese of Asti itself fixes the beginning of the diocese in the 5th century.

Scholars have suggested that more than one figure came to melt into the tale of St. Evasius, thus making it extremely difficult to use the existing material as an historical source. The situation is so confused that some historians list five different Saint Evasiuses. Lanzoni notes a purported Evasius in 261, another in 364, a third in 389, a fourth in 419, and the fifth in the time of King Liutprand (712–744). A catalogue of bishops of Asti, written in 1606, assigns him a date of 783.

The first known bishop of Asti was Pastor in 451. Bishop Audax (904-926) obtained the confirmation of the liberties of the Church of Asti from King Berengarius, and was a friend of Rudolph of Burgundy. He sought to have hisCanons called "cardinals", as they were at S, Eusebio in Vercelli.

The bishops of Asti were feudatory vassals of the Holy Roman Empire and of the Counts (Dukes) of Savoy. In turn, they were feudal overlords of fiefs belonging to Corveglia, Castellinaldo, Montaldo Roero, Monteu Roero, Piea, Monticelli, Pocapaglia, Govone, Vezza, Cellarengo, S. Vittoria, S. Stefano Roero, Piobesi, Magliano, Cossombrato, Castagnito. and Castellino de Voltis.

Also subject to the Bishop of Asti were the abbeys of Santi Apostoli, S. Anastasio, and S. Cristoforo in the city of Asti, S. Bartolomeo de Azano, and S. Dalmazio de Pedona. The bishops had also been given the monastery of S. Maria de Caramania in the diocese of Turin by Pope Calixtus II (1119–1124). There was a house of the Knights Templar in Asti, called the Domus Hospitalis Soldani, as early as 1182; it belonged to the Lombard province and came to an end, along with the Templars, in 1312.

In the 14th century, the city of Asti became subject to the Kings of Naples, and then to the Visconti of Milan. Galeozzo Visconti gave Asti to Louis of Valois, Duke of Orleans, son of King Charles V of France. Asti became part of the French kingdom until it was handed over to the Duchy of Savoy in 1575.

=== The French Republic and Napoleonic Empire ===
During the French occupation, between 1802 and 1805, Piedmont was annexed to metropolitan France and divided into six departments: Ivrea or Doire (Dora), Marengo, Po or Eridan, Sofia, Stura, and Tanaro. Asti was made the capital of the French department of Tanaro. At the imperial reorganization in 1805 and then from 1805 to 1814 it was part of the department of Marengo, whose capital was at Alessandria. The department was under the jurisdiction of a French Prefect.

The French government, in the guise of ending the practices of feudalism, confiscated the incomes and benefices of the bishops and priests and made them employees of the state, with a fixed income and the obligation to swear an oath of loyalty to the French constitution. As in metropolitan France, the government program also included reducing the number of bishoprics and making them conform as far as possible with the civil administration's "departments". In accordance with the Concordat of 1801, and at the demand of the First Consul N. Bonaparte, Pope Pius VII was compelled to issue the bull Gravissimis causis (1 June 1803), in which the number of dioceses in Piedmont was reduced from seventeen to eight: Turin, Vercelli, Ivrea, Acqui, Asti, Mondovi, Alessandria and Saluzzo. The details of the new geographical divisions were left in the hands of Cardinal Giovanni Battista Caprara, the Papal Legate in Paris. In 1805 the diocese of Alba (Pompeia) was suppressed and its territory was entrusted to the Bishop of Asti. Cardinal Caprara issued his instructions for the reordering of the parishes of the diocese of Asti on 23 January 1805.

When Bishop Pietro Arborio Gattinara died in January 1809, the Emperor of the French, Napoleon I, nominated as bishop of Asti François-André Dejean, but he could not obtain his bulls from Rome, and then Pius VII became a prisoner of the French government. Dejean served as Vicar Capitular, though without proper credentials, governing the Church of Asti and Alba until 1814. With the end of the French Empire, Dejean was expelled from Asti, which he had been holding illegitimately; he was sent to Ivrea, where he remained for a year before being repatriated to France, where he died in 1820.

After Waterloo, the Congress of Vienna agreed to the restoration of the Kingdom of Sardinia and the Papal States, both of which were in a state of disarray because of French political and administrative actions. The confused situation of the dioceses in Piedmont was addressed by Pope Pius VII in his bull Beati Petri (17 July 1817), as far as the redrawing of diocesan boundaries was concerned.

Following the restoration, the new Bishop of Asti, Antonio Faà di Bruno, fell afoul of the forces of reaction and of constitutionalism by making imprudent remarks about Constitutionalism in Spain. Pope Pius VII had him relegated to a monastery, and Faà never took possession of his diocese, as he records in his own memorial inscription in the Gesù in Rome. Asti was thus without a bishop for two decades.

=== Synods ===
A diocesan synod was an important legislative and disciplinary tool available to a bishop. In the company of his priests he could introduce new legislation from outside the diocese, from provincial councils, from general church councils, and from the Papacy. He could issue his own decrees, and publicly require cooperation with church policies.

The earliest synod of which there is any record is that held by Bishop Guido de Valperga (1295–1327) on 7 May 1316. Another was held by Bishop Arnaldus de Roseto (1327–1348) in May 1328. Bishop Scipio Damiani (1469–1473) held his first synod in 1471, and Bishop Basinus Malabaila (1473–1475) on 21 August 1474. Another was held by Bishop Pietro Damiani (1475–1496) at the beginning of his episcopate; he held a second synod in the Episcopal Palace on 8 March 1485.

Bishop Domenico della Rovere (1569–1587) published the Constitutions of his fourth diocesan synod of 15 April 1578, and of his eighth diocesan synod of 1584. Bishop Franciscus Panicarola (1587–1594) published the decrees of his first diocesan synod of 30 August 1588; his second was held on 7 November 1591 and his third on 18 November 1593; he had announced a fourth, but died before it was held. These synods were important for the implementation of the decrees of the Council of Trent.

Bishop Giovanni Stefano Ajazza (1596–1618) published Constitutions and decrees from his first diocesan synod held on 23 October 1597; he took care to have his own and papal decrees published in Italian translation; he held his second synod on 24 October 1601, and his third on 19 April 1605. Bishop Isidoro Pentorio, (1619–1622) held a synod in 1620. Others were held by Bishop Ottavio Broglia (1624–1647) on 22 April 1627, 17 May 1634, 5 November 1643, and in 1646; by Bishop Paolo Vincenzo Roveria (1655–1665) on 13 December 1660; by Bishop Marco Antonio Tomati (1666–1693) on 14 April 1670 and in 1677; by Bishop Innocenzo Migliavacca (1693–1714) in 1699; by Bishop Giovanni Todone (1727–1739) on 29 August 1730; and by Bishop Paolo Caissotti (1762–1786) on 29 June 1785. Statutes and decrees were published in each case.

=== Cathedral and Chapter ===
The original cathedral was destroyed in 1073. Its successor was dedicated by Pope Urban II, perhaps in 1096. The third was begun by Bishop Guido de Valperga (1295–1327) in 1295, or perhaps in 1309 or 1323 or 1333. It was completed in 1768.

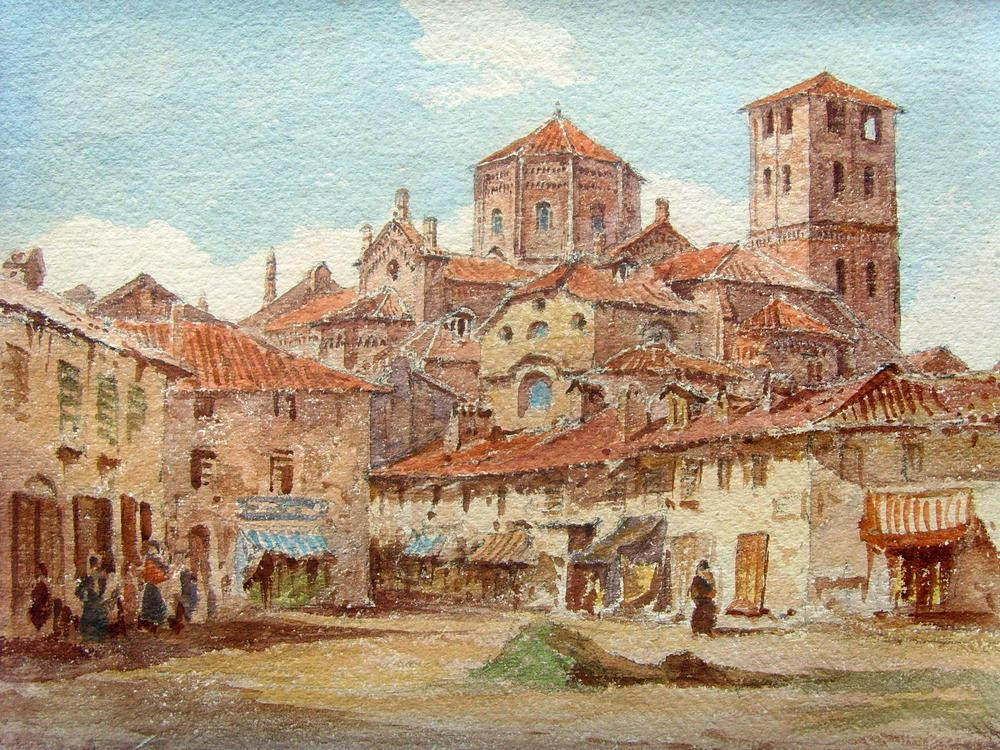
View of Asti and the Collegiata di San Secondo – Antonio Bignoli 1857.

Bishop Hilduinus had been present at the election of the Emperor Charles the Bald as King of Italy in 876, and had consented to the regulations enacted at the time. One of them declared that bishops should provide next to their cathedral an enclosed space (claustrum) in which they and their clergy should serve God according to a Canonical Rule. No evidence indicates whether his commitment went beyond his signature, but Canons existed in Asti thirty years later. On 7 May 907, Pope Sergius III confirmed, at Bishop Audax' own request, all the possessions, rights and privileges which Bishop Audax had granted to the Canons. On 25 July 1169, the Canons themselves obtained a papal bull from Pope Alexander II, taking their corporation and its property under the protection of the Holy See. The bull lists a considerable number of estates and properties that belonged to the Cathedral Chapter at that time.

One of the celebrated members of the Chapter was the Archpriest Uberto de Cocconato, who became a Cardinal in 1261 and participated in four papal elections and the Second Council of Lyon (1274).

In 1693 the Cathedral Chapter consisted of four dignities and fifteen Canons. The dignities were: the Archdeacon, the Provost, the Archpriest and the Cantor. By 1757 the number of Canons had increased to twenty-four.

There were also three collegiate churches in Asti. The first, the Collegiate Church of San Secondo, had a Chapter headed by a Provost and a Cantor, with ten Canons. A second was S. Martino, the third S. Paolo, which had Chaplains instead of Canons. They were all abolished in the 19th century.

=== Seminary ===
The Council of Trent in its 23rd Session, meeting on 15 July 1563, issued a decree whose 18th chapter required that every diocese have a seminary for the training of clergy. A seminary was therefore opened in Asti in 1577 by Bishop Domenico della Rovere in a house next to the church of S. Ilario, which had once been a parish church but had been suppressed and united with the Cathedral in 1565. Initial funding came from a 10% tax on all benefices in the diocese (cancelled in 1588), but eventually an endowment was created by attaching fourteen churches to the seminary to provide incomes for the clerics. The seminary had to be closed between 1630 and 1642, due to the war between France and the Emperor Charles V, fought mostly in Savoy. The number of students was supposed to be twenty-five, but in 1695 there were only twelve, and the premises were in a state of neglectful disrepair. Bishop Innocenzo Milliavacca (1693–1714), at the diocesan synod of November 1695, issued a set of statutes for the seminary and undertook repairs, and in 1699 the building was rededicated. In 1742 there were (from most advanced to least) 16 students in theology, 14 in philosophy, 2 in rhetoric, 16 in the humanities, and 9 in grammar. By 1762 the old building was completely decrepit, and Bishop Paolo Maurizio Caisotti, at the very beginning of his episcopate in 1762, launched the construction of a completely new building, which was completed in 1775. From 1764 to 1890 the seminary was under the direction of the Congregation of Oblate Priests of S. Eusebio of Villafranca d'Asti.

== Bishops of Asti ==
=== to 1300 ===
- Pastor (c. 451)

...

- Maiorianus (c. 465)

...

- Benenatus (c. 680)

...

- Bernulfus (c. 800)

...

- Hilduinus (Ildoinus) (c. 876–c. 880)
- Josephus (881–887)
- Staurax (c. 892–899)
- Eilolfus (c. 901-902)
- Audax (904-926)
- Brunengus (937–964)
- Rozone (967–989)
- Petrus (991–1004)
- Alricus (1008 – Dec 1036)
- Obertus (c. 1037)
- Petrus (1040–1043)
- Guglielmo (1044–1049?)
- Wibertinus (attested 1046)
- Guido (attested 1049)
- Girelmo (c. 1054–c. 1065)
- Ingo (c. 1066–c. 1080)
- Ottone (1080–after 1098)
- Landolfo (1103–1132)
- Ottone (1133–1142)
- Nazarius (attested 1143)
- Anselmus (1148–1172)
- Guilelmus (1173–1191)
- Nazarius (1192–1196)
- Bonifatius (1198–1206)
- Guidotto
- Jacobus Porta
- Umbertus (Obertus)
- Bonifatius de Cocconato (1243–1260)
- Conradus de Cocconato (1260–1282)
- Obertus (1282–1293)

Sede vacante (1294–1295)

- Guido de Valperga (1295–1327)

=== from 1300 to 1600 ===
- Arnaldus de Roseto (1327–1348)
- Baldratus Malabayla (1348–1355)
- Joannes Malabayla (1355–1376)
- François Morozzi (1376–1380 Died)
- Antonius de Viali (1380–1381) (Roman Obedience)
- Franciscus Galli (Avignon Obedience)
- Joannes, Patriarch of Antioch (Administrator) (Avignon Obedience)
- Albertus Guttuario d'Agliano (1409–1439)
- Bernardo Landriani (1439–1446)
- Filippo Baudo Roero (1447–1469)
- Scipio Damiano (1469–1473)
- Basinus Malabaila (1473–1475)
- Pietro Damiani (1475–1496)
- Raphael de Ceva (1496–1499)
- Antonio Trivulzio (1499–1508)
- Albertino Roero (Rovere) (1508)
- Antonio Trivulzio
- Scaramuzza Trivulzio (Administrator) (1519)
- Vasino Malabayla (1519–1525 Died)
- Fernando de Gerona, O.S.A. (1525–1528 Appointed, Bishop of Venosa)
- Ambrogio Talento (1528–1528 Died)
- Agostino Trivulzio (1528–1529 Resigned)
- Scipione Roero (1529–1536 Died)
- Agostino Trivulzio (1536–1548 Died)
- Bernardino della Croce, B. (1547–1548 Appointed, Bishop of Como)
- Gaspare Capris (1550–1569 Died)
- Domenico della Rovere (bishop), O.P. (1569–1587 Died)
- Francesco Panigarola, O.F.M. (1587–1594)
- Caesar Benzio (1594–1595 Died)

=== from 1600 to 1900 ===
- Giovanni Stefano Ajazza (1596–1618 Died)
- Isidoro Pentorio, B. (1619–1622 Died)
- Ottavio Broglia (1624–1647 Died)
- Paolo Vincenzo Roveria, B. (1655–1665 Died)
- Marco Antonio Tomati (1666–1693 Died)
- Innocenzo Migliavacca (Milliavacca), O. Cist. (1693–1714)

Sede vacante (1714–1727)

- Giovanni Todone (1727–1739)

Sede vacante (1739–1741)

- Giuseppe Filippo Felissano (1741–1757)
- Giovanni Filippo Antonio San Martini (1757–1761)
- Paolo Maurizio Caissotti, C.O. (1762–1786)
- Pietro Arborio Gattinara (1788–1809)

Sede vacante (1809–1818)

- Antonio Faà di Bruno (1818–1829)

Sede vacante (1829–1832)

- Michele Amatore Lobetti (1832–1840)
- Filippo Artico (1840–1859)

Sede vacante (1859–1867)

- Carlo Savio (1867–1881)
- Giuseppe Ronco (1881–1898 Died)

=== since 1900 ===
- Giacinto Arcangeli (ov 1898–6 Feb 1909 Died)
- Luigi Spandre (1909–1932)
- Umberto Rossi (1932–1952 Died)
- Giacomo Cannonero (1952–1977 Died)
- Vito Nicola Cavanna (1977–1980 Died)
- Franco Sibilla (1980–1989 Resigned)
- Severino Poletto (1989–1999 Appointed, Archbishop of Turin)
- Francesco Guido Ravinale (2000–2018)
- Marco Prastaro (2018– )

== Parishes ==
A list of the 107 parishes of the diocese, arranged by Vicariate as they were in 1894, was printed by Getano Bosio in Storia della Chiesa d'Asti. The modern diocese, which currently covers an area of 1,451 km^{2}, is divided into 128 parishes. The majority are in the Province of Asti, while the rest are divided between the provinces of Alessandria and Turin. Since 1980 the diocese has closed and consolidated thirteen parishes. The diocese of Asti maintains web pages listing the parishes in the diocese with mailing addresses. For a listing of parishes by province and commune see List of parishes of the Roman Catholic Diocese of Asti.

== Bibliography ==
=== Reference works ===
- Gams, Pius Bonifatius (1873). Series episcoporum Ecclesiae catholicae: quotquot innotuerunt a beato Petro apostolo. Ratisbon: Typis et Sumptibus Georgii Josephi Manz. pp. 808–809. (in Latin)
- Eubel, Conradus, ed. (1913). Hierarchia catholica. Vol. Tomus 1 (second ed.). Münster: Libreria Regensbergiana. (in Latin)
- Eubel, Conradus, ed. (1914). Hierarchia catholica. Vol. Tomus 2 (second ed.). Münster: Libreria Regensbergiana. (in Latin)
- Gulik, Guilelmus (1923). Eubel, Conradus (ed.). Hierarchia catholica. Vol. Tomus 3 (second ed.). Münster: Libreria Regensbergiana. (in Latin)
- Gauchat, Patritius (Patrice) (1935). Hierarchia catholica. Vol. Tomus IV (1592-1667). Münster: Libraria Regensbergiana. (in Latin)
- Ritzler, Remigius; Sefrin, Pirminus (1952). Hierarchia catholica medii et recentis aevi V (1667-1730). Patavii: Messagero di S. Antonio.
- Ritzler, Remigius; Sefrin, Pirminus (1958). Hierarchia catholica medii et recentis aevi. Vol. Tomus VI (1730-1799). Patavii: Messagero di S. Antonio. (in Latin)
- Ritzler, Remigius; Sefrin, Pirminus (1968). Hierarchia Catholica medii et recentioris aevi sive summorum pontificum, S. R. E. cardinalium, ecclesiarum antistitum series... A pontificatu Pii PP. VII (1800) usque ad pontificatum Gregorii PP. XVI (1846) (in Latin). Vol. VII. Monasterii: Libr. Regensburgiana.
- Remigius Ritzler; Pirminus Sefrin (1978). Hierarchia catholica Medii et recentioris aevi... A Pontificatu PII PP. IX (1846) usque ad Pontificatum Leonis PP. XIII (1903) (in Latin). Vol. VIII. Il Messaggero di S. Antonio.
- Pięta, Zenon (2002). Hierarchia catholica medii et recentioris aevi... A pontificatu Pii PP. X (1903) usque ad pontificatum Benedictii PP. XV (1922) (in Latin). Vol. IX. Padua: Messagero di San Antonio. ISBN 978-88-250-1000-8.

=== Studies ===
- Assandria, Giuseppe (1904). Il Libro Verde della Chiesa d'Asti (in Italian and Latin). Vol. I. Pinerolo: Chinatore-Mascarelli.
- Assandria, Giuseppe (1907). Il Libro Verde della Chiese d'Asti. Biblioteca della Società Storica Subalpina, XXVI (in Italian and Latin). Vol. II. Pinerolo: Chiantore-Mascarelli.
- Boatteri, Pietro Giovanni (1807). Serie cronologico-storica de'vescovi della chiesa d'Asti (in Italian). Asti: Zucconi e Massa.
- Bosio, Gaspare (1894). Storia della chiesa d'Asti Asti: Michelerio. (in Italian)
- Cappelletti, Giuseppe (1858). Le chiese d'Italia: dalla loro origine sino ai nostri giorni (in Italian). Vol. decimoquarto (14). Venice: G. Antonelli.
- Cipolla, Carlo (1887). Di Audace vescovo di Asti e di due documenti inediti che lo riguardano Torino 1887. (in Italian)
- Cipolla, Carlo (1890). "Di Brunengo vescovo d'Asti, e di tre documenti inediti che lo riguardano", Miscellanea di Storia Italiana (in Italian). Vol. Tomo XXVIII. Torino: Fratelli Bocca. 1890. pp. 297–512.
- Fissore, Gian Giacomo (1973). "Problemi della documentazione vescovile astigiana per i secoli X-XII", Bollettino Storico-Bibliografico Subalpino, 71 (1973), pp. 416–510.
- Fissore, Gian Giacomo (1995). "Problemi della documentazione vescovile astigiana per i secoli X-XII." In: La memoria delle chiese. Cancellerie vescovili e culture notarili nell'Italia centro-settentrionale (secoli X-XIII). I florilegi (4). Scriptorium, Torino, pp. 41–94.
- Gabiani, Niccola; Gabotto, Ferdinando (1906). Contributi alla storia di Asti nel Medio Evo (in Italian). Pinerolo: Società storica subalpina.
- Gabotto, Ferdinando (1903). Asta e la politica Sabauda in Italia al tempo di Guglielmo Ventura. Biblioteca della Società Storica Subalpina, XVIII. Mem. Vii (in Italian). Pinerolo: Chiantore-Mascarelli.
- Gabotto, Ferdinando (1907). Le Carte delli Archivio Capitolare di Asti (in Italian and Latin). Pinerolo: Chiantore-Mascarelli.
- Kehr, Paul Fridolin (1914). Italia pontificia : sive, Repertorium privilegiorum et litterarum a romanis pontificibus ante annum 1598 Italiae ecclesiis, monasteriis, civitatibus singulisque personis concessorum. Vol. VI. pars ii. Berolini: Weidmann. pp. 170–180.
- Lanzoni, Francesco (1927). Le diocesi d'Italia dalle origini al principio del secolo VII (an. 604). Faenza: F. Lega, pp. 823–824; 830-834; 840-841. (in Italian)
- Manno, Antonio (1891). Bibliografia storica degli stati della monarchia di Savoia (in Italian). Vol. Tomo II. Torino: Fratelli Bocca. pp. 352–414.
- Savio, Fedele (1898). Gli antichi vescovi d'Italia dalle origini al 1300 descritti per regioni: Il Piemonte (in Italian). Torino: Fratelli Bocca. pp. 109–157.
- Schwartz, Gerhard (1907). Die Besetzung der Bistümer Reichsitaliens unter den sächsischen und salischen Kaisern: mit den Listen der Bischöfe, 951-1122. Leipzig: B.G. Teubner. (in German)
- Vassallo, Carlo (1881), "Due epigrafi nella cattedrale d'Asti", Archivio storico italiano Tomo VII (Firenze 1881) pp. 415–431.(in Italian)
- Vassallo, Carlo (1892). La chiesa dei Ss. Apostoli in Asti: memorie (in Italian). Asti: Tip. Giuseppe Brignolo.
