= Ambrogio Talento =

16th-century Catholic bishop

Most Reverend Ambrogio Talento
- Bishop of Asti
- Church: Catholic Church
- Diocese: Diocese of Asti
- In office: 1528
- Predecessor: Fernando de Gerona
- Successor: Agostino Trivulzio

Personal details
- Died: Aug 1528

Ambrogio Talento (died 1528) was a Roman Catholic prelate who served as Bishop of Asti (1528).

== Biography ==
On 23 Mar 1528, Ambrogio Talento was appointed during the papacy of Pope Clement VII as Bishop of Asti. He served as Bishop of Asti until his death in Aug 1528.

== External links and additional sources ==
- Cheney, David M. "Diocese of Asti". Catholic-Hierarchy.org. (for Chronology of Bishops) ^{[self-published]}
- Chow, Gabriel. "Diocese of Asti (Italy)". GCatholic.org. (for Chronology of Bishops) ^{[self-published]}

Catholic Church titles
Preceded by Fernando de Gerona	Bishop of Asti; 1528	Succeeded by Agostino Trivulzio
