= Agostino Trivulzio =

Italian cardinal

- Cardinal-Deacon
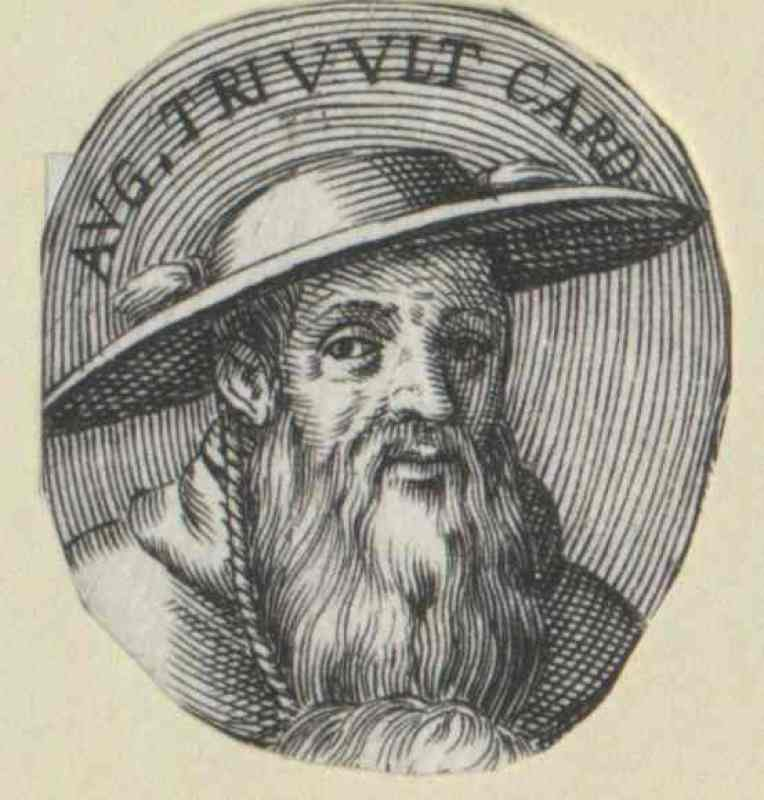
- Agostino Trivulzio
- Church: S. Adriano, Rome

Orders
- Created cardinal: 1517 by Pope Leo X

Personal details
- Born: c. 1485 Milan, IT
- Died: 1548 (aged 62–63) Rome, IT
- Parents: Giovanni Trivulzio; Angela Martinengo

Agostino Trivulzio (c. 1485–1548) was an Italian Cardinal and papal legate.

== Biography ==
Agostino was from a noble family in Milan, the eighth child of Giovanni Trivulzio di Borgomanero, a Councillor of the Dukes of Milan, and Angela (or Agnolina, or Anna) Martinengo of Brescia, and was the nephew of Cardinal Gianantonio (or Antonio) Trivulzio (1500–1508). Another uncle, Cardinal Antonio's brother Teodoro, was Governor of La Palice, of Genoa (from 1526), of Milan, and a Marshal of France.

Before going to Rome, Agostino was Commendatory (Komtur) of the Benedictine Abbey of SS. Pietro and Paolo at Lodi Vecchio, and Abbot Commendatory of the Cistercian house of Aquafredda (Santa Maria Montisfrigidi) on Lake Como. He was later appointed Cardinal Protector of the Cistercian Order.

Agostino was Chamberlain of Honor to Pope Julius II (1503–1513), and then Protonotary Apostolic de numero Participantium, a title he still held when appointed Cardinal. But when Julius II allied himself with Venice and Spain against France in 1511, Trivulzio left the Papal Court and returned to Milan. The election of Pope Leo X (Medici) in 1513, however, changed the political scene, and Trivulzio returned to court.

=== Cardinal ===
In Pope Leo X's fifth Consistory for the creation of cardinals, on 1 July 1517, Agostino was one of thirty-one prelates who were created Cardinals. He was named a Cardinal-Deacon, and on 6 July assigned the Deaconry of S. Adriano, which had once been the ancient Roman Senate House.

Agostino was named Administrator of the diocese of Reggio Calabria in the Consistory of 24 August 1520 by Pope Leo X; he resigned in September after only one month in favor of his brother Pietro, who held the diocese for three years. Cardinal Agostino then resumed the Administratorship, which he held until 1529. Obviously this was a family matter, and involved income, not the care of souls.

Agostino was named Bishop of Alessano on 3 June 1521, which he resigned in 1526.

==== Conclave of 1521–1522 ====
Pope Leo X died on Sunday, 1 December 1521, at the age of 46. The Conclave to elect his successor should have begun in mid-December, but the Cardinals themselves fixed an opening date of 18 December. When it was learned, however, that the Cardinal of Ivrea, Bonifacio Ferrero, had been detained by Spanish troops at Pavia, the decision was taken to postpone the opening of the Conclave until 26 December. This gave all the participants plenty of time for pratticà (politicking). On Sunday the 22nd, the usual morning Congregation of the Cardinals took place at the house of the Dean of the College of Cardinals, Bernardino de Carvajal, but later in the day, a private meeting was held at the house of Cardinal Colonna, at which fourteen cardinals and representatives of four other cardinals participated. Their object was to stop the election of Cardinal Giulio de' Medici, who was the favorite candidate of the Spanish. Among the dissenters were Cardinal Agostino Trivulzio and Cardinal Scaramuccia Trivulzio ("Como"), both members of the French faction. The large number of candidates (papabili) also worked against Medici by dividing the vote among a dozen or more hopefuls. Medici controlled around fifteen votes, and he was able to block any objectionable candidate by denying him the canonically required two-thirds of the votes; but he realized that he himself was not electable. It was not until 9 January 1522, after the tenth ballot had taken place, that a successful election was achieved, once it was revealed that the Emperor Charles V favored his Regent in Spain, Cardinal Adrian Dedel, Bishop of Tortosa.

==== Conclave of 1523 ====
Pope Adrian VI died of kidney disease on 14 September 1523, at the age of sixty-six. The Conclave to elect his successor held its opening ceremonies on Thursday 1 October 1523 with thirty-five cardinals in attendance. Both Trivulzio cardinals, Scaramuzzia and Agostino, were among them. The Conclave was enclosed on 2 October, though security was non-existent. Francis I expressed a preference for Cardinal Fieschi, or Cardinal Soderini (Volterra), or Cardinal Scaramuzzia Trivulzi (Como). Henry VIII supported Cardinal Wolsey, then Cardinal Medici, Cardinal Farnese and Cardinal Campeggio. The Emperor Charles V preferred Cardinal Colonna, who was a personal friend, then Cardinal Medici. His promised support for the English cardinal, Thomas Wolsey, consisted in an announcement by the Duke of Sessa that the Emperor supported Wolsey. But Wolsey was not in Rome, and the Cardinals had sworn never to elect an absentee again. Adrian of Utrecht had been more than enough for them. On 5 October, the Cardinals completed their Electoral Capitulations. On the 6th, three French cardinals arrived, François de Castelnau de Clermont, Louis de Bourbon-Vendôme, and Jean de Lorraine, and they brought the news that King Francis was opposed to Cardinal de' Medici. This produced a deadlock between the French and Imperialist parties finally broke on the night of 17/18 November, due to the capitulation of Cardinal Pompeo Colonna, a personal enemy of Medici, and Cardinal Giuliano de' Medici became Pope Clement VII.

==== More benefices ====
Cardinal Trivulzio was Administrator of the diocese of Bobbio, appointed on 26 September 1522 by Pope Adrian VI; he resigned in favor of his relative Ambrogio Trivulzio, who was appointed Bishop on 27 May 1524. This was probably another case of a cardinalatial benefice being converted into a family position.

He was also appointed Administrator of Toulon on 22 June 1524 by Pope Clement VII (Medici), in succession to the late Administrator Cardinal Niccolò Fieschi; Cardinal Trivulzio held the post until 7 June 1535, when he relinquished it to Antonio Trivulzio, the cousin of Cardinal Agostino and the nephew of Cardinal Scaramuccia Trivulzio. He was Administrator of Le Puy in 1525, from 15 September to 18 October. He was named Administrator of the diocese of Avranches on 2 May 1526, and he relinquished the post on 19 October 1526 to Jean de Lagniac, a member of the King's Council.

In 1524-1525, Cardinal Trivulzio built a villa to the east of Rome, near the source of the Aqua Adria, at Sulmone. It was furnished with gardens, and decorated with antique statuary.

=== Diplomat ===
In the Consistory of 7 December 1526 Msgr. Trivulzio was named Legatus de latere of the Marittima and Campania, and sent to the Papal Army which was opposing the aggression of the Colonna forces led by Cardinal Pompeo Colonna in a revolution against Pope Clement VII. Toward the end of March Cardinal Trivulzio was sent to Gaeta to negotiate with the Spanish viceroy of Naples, Lannoy, about the return of some towns seized by Naples and about the return of the papal fleet. He returned to the Curia on 3 April 1527.

When the forces of Spain, the German Landsknecht, and the Colonna stormed the walls of Rome on 7 May 1527, Cardinal Trivulzio was one of the sixteen cardinals who fled with Pope Clement VII to the apparent sanctuary of the Castel Sant'Angelo. The choice turned out to be a trap, a prison in which the Papal Court was held from May to November. After the 1527 sack of Rome, on 26 November, he was taken as a hostage for good papal behavior. He attempted to escape from the Castel S. Angelo as soon as the treaty was signed, putting on civilian dress and a cloak, but he was recognized and arrested; at the Pope's request, though, he was allowed the freedom of the Castel. The Pope finally left the Castel on 6 December 1527, after seven months in captivity, and immediately headed for Capranica, on his way to Orvieto. The cardinals who were to be hostages were taken to Ostia to await a galley to transport them to Naples. The Imperial forces carried Cardinal Trivulzio off to detention in the Castel Nuovo in Naples. He and Cardinal Pisani were finally released in March 1529, after negotiations and concessions by Clement VII.

Cardinal Trivulzio was appointed Administrator of the diocese of Asti on 25 September 1528 by Pope Clement VII, and he relinquished the position on the appointment of a Bishop on 16 July 1529; when that bishop died in 1536, Cardinal Agostino again assumed the Administratorship, which he enjoyed until 1547.

He was subsequently a major pro-French figure in papal diplomacy. In April 1530 he was sent as Nuncio to France, on a mission that lasted a month.

The Cardinal was named Administrator of the diocese of Bayeux in 1531, after the death of Bishop Pierre de Martigny some ten years earlier; he held the position until his death.

==== Conclave of 1534 ====
In September 1533, Pope Clement VII made a journey to Marseille, having arranged a marriage between his niece Catherine and the second son of King Francis, Henri, Duc d' Anjou. He also arranged to engage in serious peace talks with King Francis and the Emperor Charles. The marriage took place on 28 October, in Marseille, but the peace talks, in which the Pope met repeatedly but separately with the two monarchs, produced no resolution of any of the issues. Cardinal Trivulzio was present at the wedding and peace conference. The Pope returned to Rome on 10 December, ill with a fever and stomach problems. In August 1534, Cardinal Trivulzio, who was keeping King Francis I informed about French business in the Roman Curia, wrote that the Pope was suffering from a serious illness and that the doctors believed he was in danger of death. Clement VII died on 25 September 1534, having lived 56 years and four months, and having reigned for 10 years, 10 months, and 7 days. The Conclave to elect his successor began on the evening of 10 October, with thirty-two cardinals in attendance at the opening ceremonies, one of whom was Agostino Trivulzio. On the 11th, the various bulls governing conclaves were read out, including Pope Julius II's bull against simony, and the cardinals took solemn oaths to observe the bulls. They also voted to accept and authorize the Electoral Capitulations which had been drawn up for the Conclave of 1513, and to use an open ballot with an accessio when the voting began next day. Shortly after sunset on the 11th, however, the representatives of the Imperial and the French factions, Cardinals Ippolito de' Medici and Jean de Lorraine, met with Cardinal Alessandro Farnese, the Dean of the College of Cardinals, and informed him that there was agreement that he would be the next pope. They escorted him to the Pauline Chapel, where Cardinal Giovanni Piccolomini, the Sub-Dean, pronounced Farnese pope, with the unanimous agreement of the cardinals. The transaction was officially witnessed by the three Masters of Ceremonies, who were also Protonotaries Apostolic. The next morning, 12 October, a written vote was held, and Farnese was elected unanimously, as expected. He chose the name Paul III.

Trivulzio was appointed Administrator of the diocese of Brugnato on 21 February 1539, until he resigned on 5 March 1548. He was appointed Administrator of the diocese of Périgueux on 27 August 1541, on the resignation of the previous Administrator, Cardinal Claude de Longwy de Givry; he held the position until his death.

In Consistory, on 2 June 1536, Pope Paul III stated that he intended to send legates to the Emperor Charles V, to King Ferdinand, and to King Francis I for the sake of preserving the peace. He assigned Cardinals Marino Caraccioli, Francisco Quiñones, and Agostino Trivulzio to the task. Trivulzio received his credentials as Legate on 14 June; he had an interview with the Emperor at Savigliano, south of Turin, on 9 July. He arrived at the French Court at Lyon on 21 July, and departed on 16 October. He submitted his comprehensive report to the Pope on 4 November 1536.

In 1546, Cardinal Trivulzio attended and played a prominent role in the Council of Trent.

=== Death ===
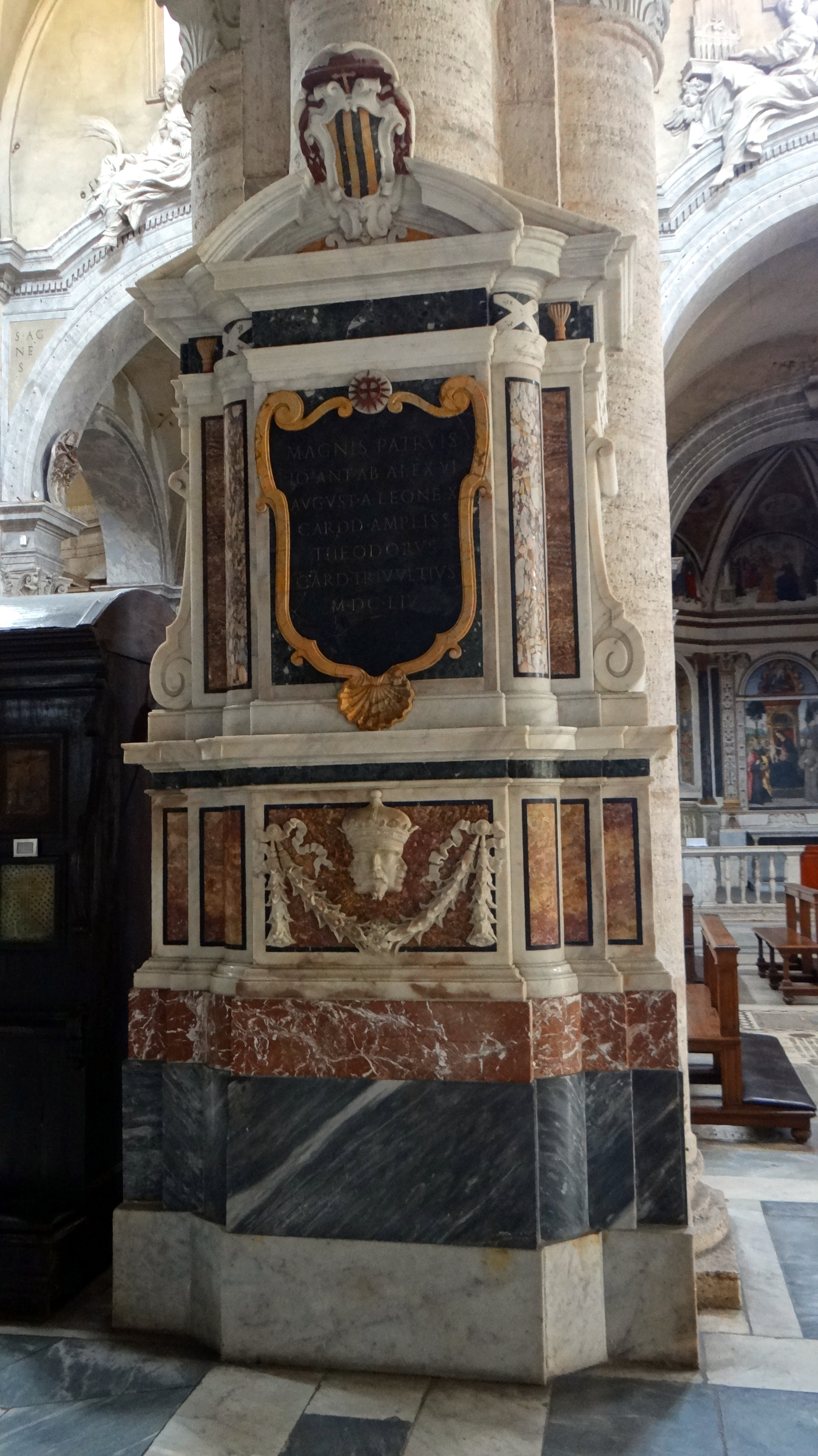
Memorial of Cardinal Trivulzio, S. Maria del Popolo

Cardinal Agostino Trivulzio died in Rome, in his palazzo in the Regio Parione, which had once belonged to Cardinal Fieschi of Genoa, on 30 March 1548 at 22:00 hours, Rome time. He was buried in the Church of S. Maria del Popolo in Rome. In 1654, Cardinal Teodoro Trivulzio (1629–1656), the grand-nephew of Cardinal Giangiacomo Antonio Trivulzio, erected a modest monument to his ancestors:

MAGNIS PATRVIS
IO·ANT·AB ALEX·VI
AVGVST·A LEONE·X
CARDD·AMPLISS·
THEODORVS
CARD·TRIVVLTIVS
M·DC·LIV

== Bibliography ==
- Giuseppe Molini (1836). Documenti di storia italiana copiati su gli originali autentici e per lo più autografi esistenti in Parigi: con note (in Italian and Latin). Vol. I. Firenze: Tip. all'Insegna di Dante.
- Molini, Giuseppe, ed. (1837). Documenti di Storia Italiana copiati su gli originali autentici e per lo piú autografi existenti in Parigi (in Italian and Latin). Vol. II. Firenze: Tipografia all'insegna di Dante.
- Gualterio, marchese Filippo Antonio (1845). Corrispondenza segreta di Gian Matteo Giberto ... col cardinale Agostino Trivulzio dell' anno MDXXVII (in Italian and Latin). Turin: Fontana.
- Petruccelli della Gattina, Ferdinando (1864). Histoire diplomatique des conclaves (in French). Vol. Second volume. Paris: A. Lacroix, Verboeckhoven et cie.
- Bergenroth, G. A., ed. (1862). Calendar of Letters, Despatches, and State Papers Relating to the Negotiations Between England and Spain Preserved in the Archives at Simancas and Elsewhere: Henry VII. 1485-1509. Vol. 1. London: Longman, Green, Longman & Roberts [etc.]
- G. A. Bergenroth, ed. (1866). Calendar of Letters, Despatches, and State Papers, Relating to the Negotiations Between England and Spain, Preserved in the Archives at Simancas, Vienna, Brussels, and Elsewhere (in English, Latin, and French). Vol. Henry VIII. Volume II. London: Longman, Green, Longman & Roberts.
- Pascual de Gayangos, ed. (1877). Calendar of Letters, Despatches, and State Papers Relating to the Negotiations Between England and Spain Preserved in the Archives at Simancas and Elsewhere: Henry VIII. 1509-[1546] 12 v. Vol. III, Part 2 (Henry VIII) 1527-1529. London: Longman, Green, Longman, & Roberts. p. 164.
- Brown, Rawdon, ed. (1871). Calendar of State Papers and Manuscripts, Relating to English Affairs, Existing in the Archives and Collections of Venice: 1527-1533. Vol. IV. London: Longman Green.
- Motta, Emilio (1890). Libri di casa Trivulzio nel secolo XVo: con notizie di altre librerie milanesi del Trecento e del Quattrocento (in Italian). Como: Tip. e Libreria ditta C. Franchi de A Vismara.
- Fabriczy, Carl von (1896). "Das Landhaus des Kardinals Trivulzio am Salone". Jahrbuch der Königlich Preussischen Kunstsammlungen. 17: 186–205. JSTOR 25167363.
- Creighton, Mandell (1897). A History of the Papacy from the Great Schism to the Sack of Rome. Vol. VI. London: Longmans, Green, and Company. ISBN 9780837077819.
- Gregorovius, Ferdinand (1902). Annie Hamilton, tr. (ed.). History of the City of Rome in the Middle Ages. Vol. VIII, part 2. London: G. Bell & sons.
- Gulik, Guilelmus van; Konrad Eubel (1923). L. Schmitz-Kallenberg (ed.). Hierarchia catholica medii aevi (in Latin). Vol. III (editio altera ed.). Münster: sumptibus et typis librariae Regensbergianae.
- Barbiche, Bernard; de Dainville-Barbiche, Ségolène (1985). "Les légats à latere en France et leurs facultés aux XVIe et XVIIe siècles". Archivum Historiae Pontificiae. 23: 93–165. JSTOR 23564223.
- La Villa Trivulzio a Salone di Roma: Conoscenza e rappresentazione dell'Architettura. Collana di Rilievi (in Italian). Rome: Gangemi Editore spa. 2011. ISBN 978-88-492-7120-1.
