= Abundius =

Roman Catholic Saint

Saint Abundius
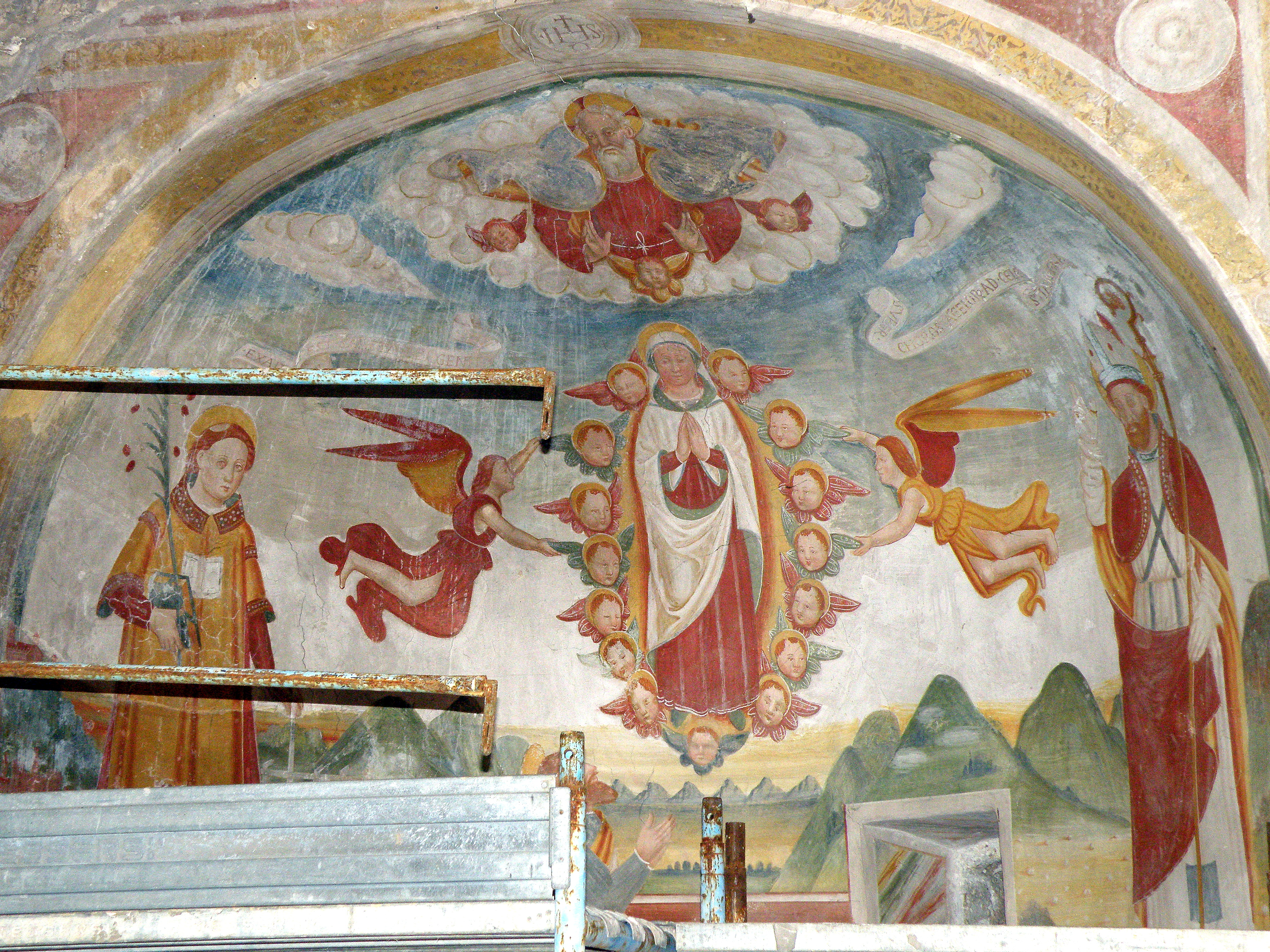

Hermit, bishop, and confessor
- Born: fifth century Thessalonica, Greece
- Died: 469
- Venerated in: Roman Catholic Church; Eastern Orthodox Church
- Major shrine: Basilica di Sant'Abbondio, Como
- Feast: 2 April
- Attributes: depicted in art as a bishop with a stag; sometimes he is shown raising a dead child to life
- Patronage: The city and the diocese of Como

Abundius (also Abondius, Abundias, or Abbondio; early fifth century – 469), venerated in the Catholic Church as Saint Abundius, was a bishop of Como, Northern Italy.

== Biography ==
Abundius was born at Thessalonica. Around 448 Abundius became the fourth Bishop of Como, succeeding Amantius. He was present at the Council of Constantinople in 448, and took an active part against the Eutychian heresy at Chalcedon (451), where he was the representative of Pope Leo the Great. In 452 he also took part in the Council of Milan, convened to refute the same heresy. Abundius is one of those to whom the authorship of the Te Deum is attributed.

The Romanesque church of Sant'Abbondio at Como, consecrated in 1095 by Pope Urban II, is dedicated to him, and his relics are conserved beneath its principal altar.
