= Antonio Trivulzio, iuniore =

Italian Roman Catholic bishop and cardinal

His Eminence Antonio Trivulzio
- Cardinal-Priest of Santi Giovanni e Paolo
- Church: Catholic Church

Personal details
- Born: 1514 Milan, Italy
- Died: 25 June 1559 (aged 44–45) Paris, France

Antonio Trivulzio the Younger (It.:Antonio Trivulzio, iuniore) (d. 1559) was an Italian Roman Catholic bishop and cardinal.

== Biography ==
Antonio Trivulzio was born in Milan ca. 1514, the son of Gerolamo Teodoro Trviulzio and Antonia da Barbiano. He was the nephew of Cardinal Scaramuccia Trivulzio and the cousin of Cardinal Agostino Trivulzio.

He studied law in Milan. On 7 June 1535 he was elected to be Bishop of Toulon. He traveled to Rome where he became a referendary of the Apostolic Signatura and domestic prelate of His Holiness ca. 1539. From 1544 to 1547 he served as vice-legate in Avignon. He opposed allowing Protestants to settle in Comtat Venaissin and supported the King of France's expulsion of Protestants from Cabrières-d'Avignon and Mérindol. He was vice-legate in Perugia from 1549 to June 1550. On 25 April 1550 he was made nuncio for the Kingdom of France.

Pope Paul IV made him a cardinal priest in the consistory of 15 March 1557. On 18 May 1557 he was named legate a latere to the Republic of Venice. He was given the red hat and the titular church of Santi Giovanni e Paolo on 11 October 1557. On 20 September 1557 he was named legate a latere to the Kingdom of France in order to negotiate peace between Henry II of France and Philip II of Spain; this mission ended successfully with the signing of the Treaty of Cateau-Cambrésis.

He died of an apoplexy at the Castle of Saint Martin near Paris on 25 June 1559. He was buried in the chapel of the castle.

Catholic Church titles
Preceded by Agostino Trivulzio	Bishop of Toulon; 1535–1559	Succeeded by Girolamo della Rovere
Preceded by Michele della Torre	Apostolic Nuncio to France; 1550–1556	Succeeded by Prospero Publicola Santacroce
Preceded by Filippo Archinto	Apostolic Nuncio to Venice; 1556–1557	Succeeded by Lorenzo Lenti
Preceded by Fabio Mignanelli	Cardinal-Priest of Santi Giovanni e Paolo; 1557–1559	Succeeded by Alfonso Carafa
Preceded by Giovanni Angelo de' Medici	Prefect of the Apostolic Signatura; 1557–1559	Succeeded by Ludovico Simonetta
