= Domenico della Rovere (bishop) =

16th-century Catholic bishop

Most Reverend Domenico della Rovere
- Bishop of Asti
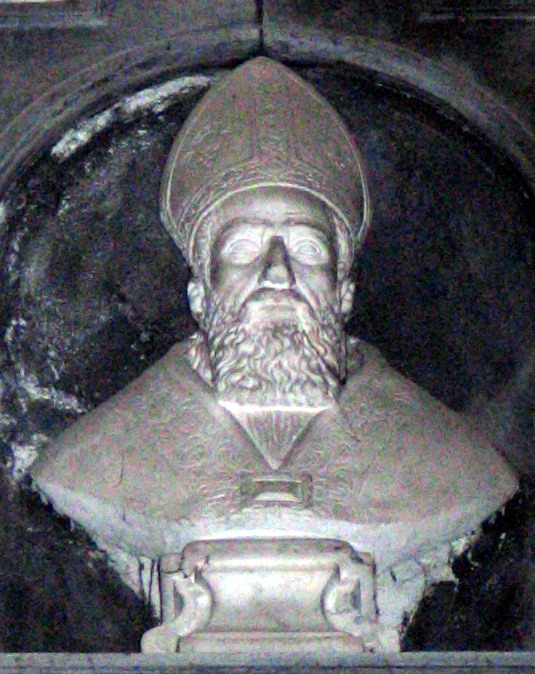
- Church: Catholic Church
- Diocese: Diocese of Asti
- In office: 1569–1587
- Predecessor: Gaspare Capris
- Successor: Francesco Panigarola

Personal details
- Died: 1587

Domenico della Rovere, O.P. (died 1587) was a Roman Catholic prelate who served as Bishop of Asti (1569–1587).

== Biography ==
Domenico della Rovere was born into a noble family from Asti, he belonged to the Dominican Order. He was ordained a priest in the Order of Preachers. On 3 Mar 1569, he was appointed during the papacy of Pope Pius V as Bishop of Asti. He served as Bishop of Asti until his death in 1587.

== External links and additional sources ==
- Cheney, David M. "Diocese of Asti". Catholic-Hierarchy.org. (for Chronology of Bishops) ^{[self-published]}
- Chow, Gabriel. "Diocese of Asti (Italy)". GCatholic.org. (for Chronology of Bishops) ^{[self-published]}

Catholic Church titles
Preceded by Gaspare Capris	Bishop of Asti; 1569–1587	Succeeded by Francesco Panigarola
