= Juan de Vera =

Spanish cardinal

His Eminence Juan de Vera
- Cardinal, Archbishop of Salerno
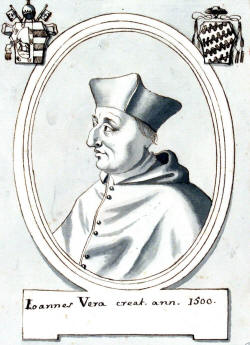
- Archdiocese: Salerno
- Appointed: 10 July 1500
- Term ended: 4 May 1507
- Predecessor: Giovanni d'Aragona
- Successor: Federigo Fregoso

Orders
- Created cardinal: 28 September 1500 by Alexander VI

Personal details
- Born: 25 November 1453 Alzira, Valencia
- Died: 4 May 1507 (aged 53) Rome, Papal States
- Buried: Basilica di Sant'Agostino

Juan de Vera (25 November 1453 – 4 May 1507), known as the Cardinal of Salerno, was a Spanish Roman Catholic bishop and cardinal.

== Biography ==
Juan de Vera was born in the castle at Alzira, Valencia. He was a relative of Pope Alexander VI. Juan de Vera was a doctor of both laws.

After completing his education, he moved to Rome and entered the service of Cardinal Roderic Llançol i de Borja (the future Pope Alexander VI). There, he was preceptor of the cardinal's son, Cesare Borgia. He later served as the cardinal's vicar in Valencia.

On 10 July 1500 he was elected Archbishop of Salerno.

Pope Alexander VI made him a cardinal priest in the consistory of 28 September 1500. He received the red hat on 2 October 1500 and the titular church of Santa Balbina on 5 October 1500. In the consistory of 5 October 1500 he was named papal legate to the Kingdom of Aragon, the Kingdom of Castile, the Kingdom of Portugal, the Kingdom of France, and the Kingdom of England, in order to promote a crusade against the Ottoman Empire. From 1501, he was also legate to the March of Ancona. He returned to Rome on 13 November 1501. He was made a canon of Burgos Cathedral in 1503.

He participated in both the papal conclave of September 1503 that elected Pope Pius III and the papal conclave of October 1503 that elected Pope Julius II. Before the first conclave, on 21 August 1503, the ambassador of Venice, A. Giustinian, wrote in a dispatch, "I am assured on the best authority that last Sunday no less than eleven cardinals swore to Caesar to have Cardinal Giovanni Vera elected, or else to bring about a schism...."

He was Camerlengo of the Sacred College of Cardinals from 1504 to 1505, chosen by seniority. On 7 August 1504 he became prior of the cathedral church of San Pedro de Fraga in Leiria and pastor of Badieles, Zaragoza. He served as governor of Piceno and of Emilia.

He died in Rome on 4 May 1507. He is buried in the Basilica di Sant'Agostino.

== Bibliography ==
- Burchard, Johannes, Diarium, sive rerum urbanum Commentarii (1483–1506). (in Latin and French). ed. Louis Thuasne. Tome Troisième (Paris: Ernest Leroux 1885).
- Cardella, Lorenzo (1793). Memorie storiche de' cardinali della santa Romana chiesa. (in Italian). Tomo Terzo, Roma: Pagliarini 1793. pp. 286–287.
- Eubel, Conradus, ed. (1914). Hierarchia catholica (in Latin). Vol. Tomus 2 (second ed.). Münster: Libreria Regensbergiana.
- Eubel, Conradus; Gulik, Guilelmus (1923). Hierarchia catholica (in Latin). Vol. 3 (second ed.). Münster: Libreria Regensbergiana.
- Flórez, Enrique (1787). España sagrada: Theatro geographico-historico de la iglesia de España. Tomo XXXVI (36) Madrid: Blas Roman 1787. pp. 100–102.

Catholic Church titles
| Preceded by Francisco de Borja | Camerlengo of the Sacred College of Cardinals; 1504 | Succeeded by Antonio Trivulzio |
