= Caesar Benzio =

Roman Catholic prelate

Most Reverend Caesar Benzio
- Bishop of Asti
- Church: Catholic Church
- Diocese: Diocese of Asti
- In office: 1594–1595
- Predecessor: Francesco Panigarola
- Successor: Giovanni Stefano Ajazza

Personal details
- Died: 18 December 1595 Asti, Italy

Caesar Benzio (died 1595) was a Roman Catholic prelate who served as Bishop of Asti (1594–1595).

== Biography ==
On 24 October 1594, Caesar Benzio was appointed during the papacy of Pope Clement VIII as Bishop of Asti. He served as Bishop of Asti until his death on 18 December 1595.

== External links and additional sources ==
- Cheney, David M. "Diocese of Asti". Catholic-Hierarchy.org. (for Chronology of Bishops) ^{[self-published]}
- Chow, Gabriel. "Diocese of Asti (Italy)". GCatholic.org. (for Chronology of Bishops) ^{[self-published]}

Catholic Church titles
Preceded by Francesco Panigarola	Bishop of Asti; 1594–1595	Succeeded by Giovanni Stefano Ajazza
