= Isidoro Pentorio =

Early 17th century Bishop of Asti

Most Reverend Isidoro Pentorio
- Bishop of Asti
- Church: Catholic Church
- Diocese: Diocese of Asti
- In office: 1619–1622
- Predecessor: Giovanni Stefano Ajazza
- Successor: Ottavio Broglia

Orders
- Consecration: 12 March 1619 by Pietro Aldobrandini

Personal details
- Born: 1568 Milan, Italy
- Died: 1622 (age 54) Asti, Italy

Bishop Isidoro Pentorio, B. (1568–1622) was a Roman Catholic prelate who served as Bishop of Asti (1619–1622).

== Biography ==
Isidoro Pentorio was born in Milan, Italy in 1568 and ordained a priest in the Clerics Regular of Saint Paul. On 18 February 1619, he was appointed during the papacy of Pope Paul V as Bishop of Asti. On 12 March 1619, he was consecrated bishop by Pietro Aldobrandini, Archbishop of Ravenna, with Philibert François Milliet de Faverges, Archbishop of Turin, and Tommaso Piolatto, Bishop of Fossano, serving as co-consecrators. He served as Bishop of Asti until his death in 1622.

== External links and additional sources ==
- Cheney, David M. "Diocese of Asti". Catholic-Hierarchy.org. (for Chronology of Bishops) ^{[self-published]}
- Chow, Gabriel. "Diocese of Asti (Italy)". GCatholic.org. (for Chronology of Bishops) ^{[self-published]}

Catholic Church titles
Preceded by Giovanni Stefano Ajazza	Bishop of Asti; 1619–1622	Succeeded by Ottavio Broglia
