= Francesco Morozzo =

Italian Roman Catholic prelate

Most Reverend Francesco Morozzo
- Bishop of Asti
- Church: Catholic Church
- Diocese: Diocese of Asti
- In office: 1376–1380

Orders
- Consecration: 1376 by Adhémar de La Roche

Personal details
- Died: 1380 Asti, Italy

Francesco Morozzo or François Morozzi (died 1380) was a Roman Catholic prelate who served as Bishop of Asti (1376–1380).

== Biography ==
On 11 August 1376, Francesco Morozzo was appointed during the papacy of Pope Gregory XI as Bishop of Asti. In 1376, he was consecrated bishop by Adhémar de La Roche, Titular Bishop of Bethleem. He served as Bishop of Asti until his death in 1380.

== External links and additional sources ==
- Cheney, David M. "Diocese of Asti". Catholic-Hierarchy.org. (for Chronology of Bishops) ^{[self-published]}
- Chow, Gabriel. "Diocese of Asti (Italy)". GCatholic.org. (for Chronology of Bishops) ^{[self-published]}

Catholic Church titles
Preceded by	Bishop of Asti; 1376–1380	Succeeded by
