= Teodoro Trivulzio =

Italian condottiero

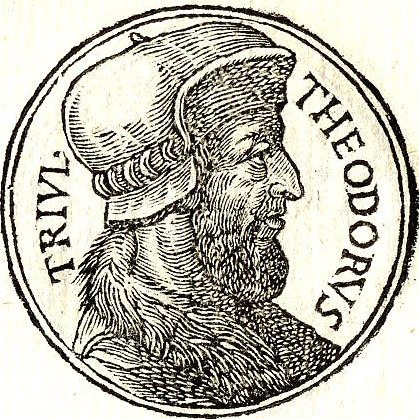
Portrait from Promptuarii Iconum Insigniorum

Teodoro Trivulzio (1458–1531) was an Italian condottiero who served the French crown during the Italian Wars and became a marshal of France in 1526.

== Biography ==
Trivulzio was born in Milan as son of Pietro Trivulzio and Laura Bossi. He was the brother of Cardinal Antonio Trivulzio and was a nephew of marshal Gian Giacomo Trivulzio.

In the service of King Louis XII, he fought with the French vanguard at the Battle of Agnadello (1509) and later took part in the Battle of Ravenna (1512). In 1521 he assisted Marshal Odet de Foix during the siege of Parma. He was appointed governor of Milan in 1525, but relinquished the post after the Battle of Pavia later that year, which marked a major reversal for the French position in northern Italy.

In 1526 Trivulzio was created marshal of France by King Francis I and appointed governor of Genoa. He failed to secure control of the city and surrendered during a revolt in 1528. In 1530 he became governor of Lyon, where he died in 1531.
