= Francesco Panigarola =

Italian prelate of the Catholic Church (1548–1594)

Most Reverend Francesco Panigarola
- Bishop of Asti
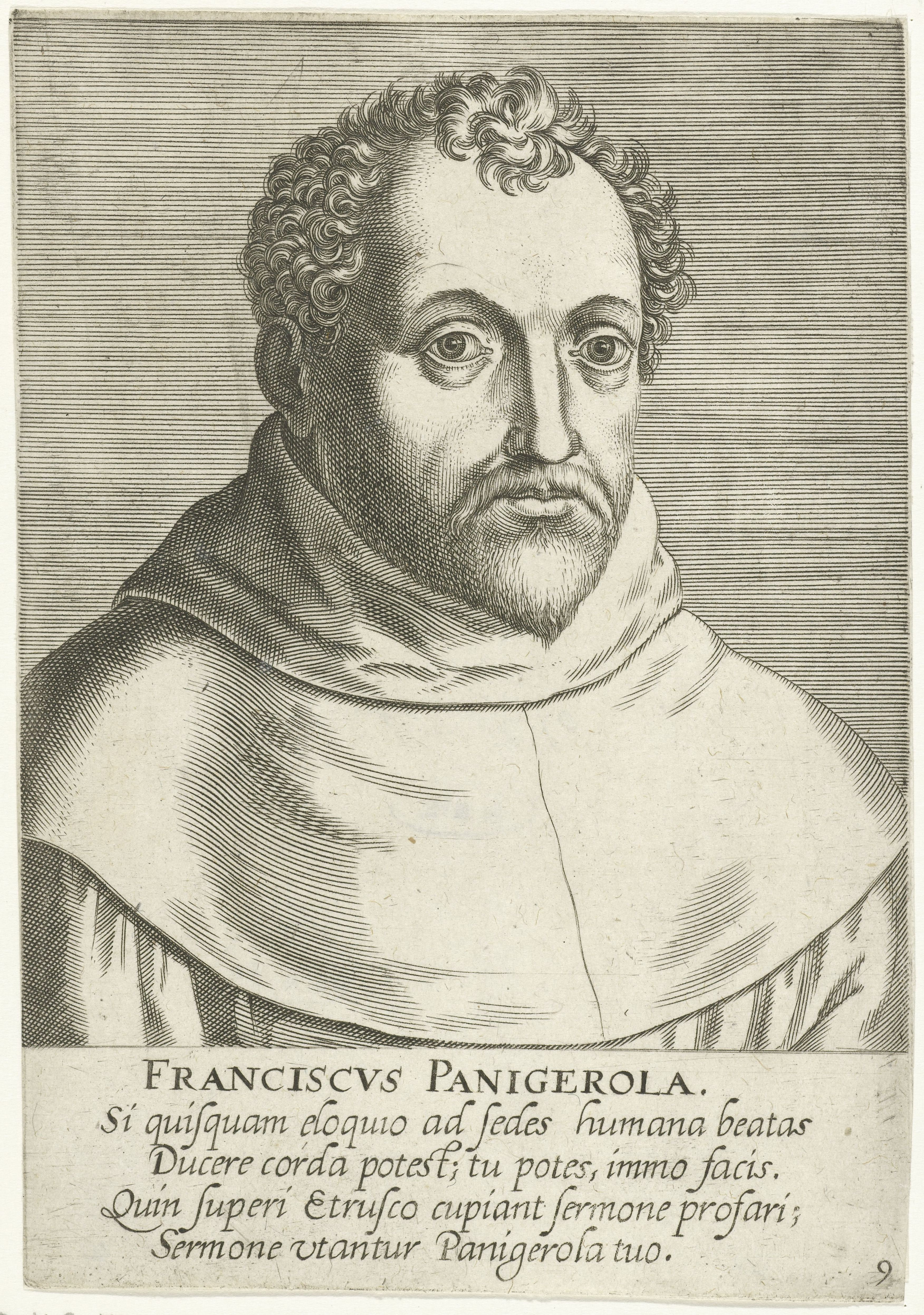
- Church: Catholic
- Diocese: Asti
- Appointed: 28 Sep 1587
- Term ended: 31 May 1594
- Previous posts: Auxiliary Bishop of Ferrara (1586–1587); Titular Bishop of Chrysopolis in Arabia (1586–1587)

Personal details
- Born: Girolamo Panigarola; 6 February 1548 Milan, Italy
- Died: 31 May 1594 (aged 46) Asti, Italy

Ordination history
History
Episcopal consecration
- Principal consecrator: Scipione Gonzaga
- Co-consecrators: Giulio Masetti, Francesco Sporeni

Francesco Panigarola (6 February 1548 – 31 May 1594) was an Italian Franciscan preacher and controversialist, and Bishop of Asti.

== Life ==
Panigarola was born at Milan. As a student of law at Pavia and Bologna he led a dissipated life; he then entered the Order of Friars Minor at Florence, 15 March 1567. At the age of twenty-three he was sent to Rome, where his sermons attracted much attention.

Pope Pius V had him sent to Paris where for two years he studied the Church Fathers and the Councils, Greek and Hebrew. Returning to Italy he preached during thirteen years in the principal towns. He converted many Calvinists in France and Savoy; at Naples there was collected, through one of his sermons, enough money to build a hospital for incurables. He also assisted in the construction of the Italian church of Antwerp, and of the Franciscan buildings at Genoa, Venice, Milan, and Turin.

During his lifetime Panigarola was known for his prodigious memory; through diligent practice of the memory palace system, he had allegedly accumulated a mental collection of more than one hundred thousand memory images.

In 1579 Panigarola attended, as custos of his province, the general chapter at Paris. Finally in 1586 Pope Sixtus V appointed him titular Bishop and Coadjutor of Ferrara, whence in 1587 he was transferred to the See of Asti. Shortly after he was sent to France as assistant to the papal legate, Cardinal Henry Cajetan. When Henry IV of France had renounced Calvinism, the bishop returned to Asti, where he died.

== Works ==
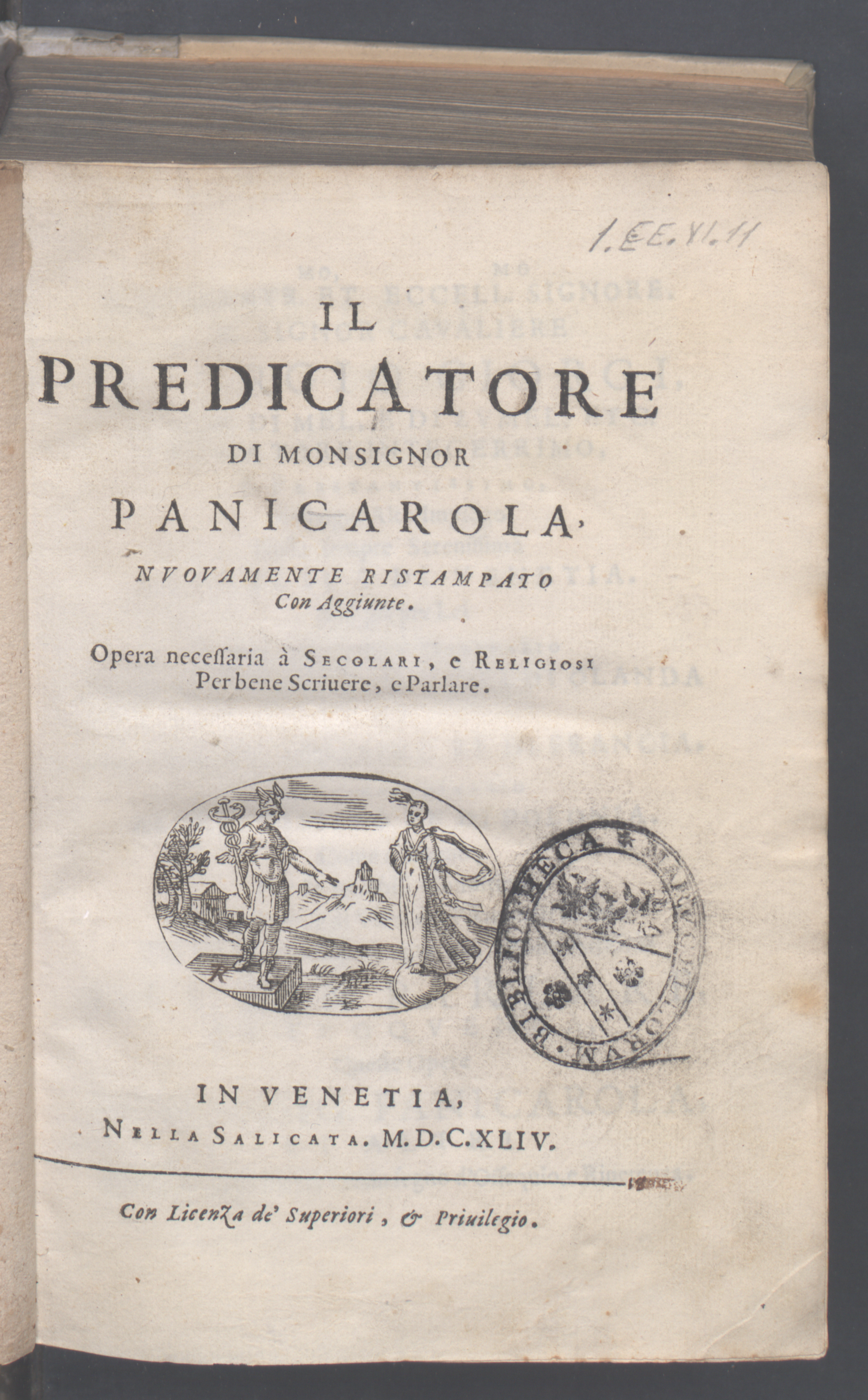
Predicatore, 1644

Stanislao Melchiorri (Annales Min. cont. XXIII ad a. 1594, n. 76-81) gives the most complete catalogue of Panigarola's works. The most important are:

- "Il Compendio degli Annali ecclesiastici del Padre Cesare Baronio", Rome, 1590; 2nd ed., Venice, 1593, comprises only the first volume of the Annales Ecclesiastici of Baronius.
- "B. Petri Apostolorum Principis Gesta ... in rapsodiæ, quam catenam appellant, speciem disposita", Asti, 1591.
- "Lettioni sopra dogmi, dette Calviniche", Venice, 1584. This work, translated into Latin (Milan, 1594), was attacked by Giacomo Picenino in "Apologia per i Riformatori e per la Religione Riformata contro le Invettive di F. Panigarola e P. Segneri ", Coira, 1706.
- "Il Predicatore di F. Francesco Panigarola ... overo Parafrase, comento e discorsi intorno al libro dell' Elocutione di Demetrio Falerco ...", Venice, 1609.
- "Specchio di Guerra"

He also wrote commentaries (Psalms, Jeremias etc.) and many collections of sermons, published in Italian and Latin. His sermons were translated in French too.

Catholic Church titles
Preceded by	Auxiliary Bishop of Ferrara; 1586–1587	Succeeded by
Preceded by Rafael Llinás	Titular Bishop of Chrysopolis in Arabia; 1586–1587	Succeeded by Melchiorre Pelletta
Preceded by Domenico della Rovere	Bishop of Asti; 1587–1594	Succeeded by Caesar Benzio
