= Saint Bernulf =

Bishop of Asti, Martyr
- Died: 9th Century AD; Asti, Kingdom of Italy
- Honored in: Eastern Orthodox Church, Roman Catholic Church
- Major shrine: Mondovì
- Feast: 24 March

Saint Bernulf or San Bernulfo or St Bernulphe (9th century AD) was Bishop of Asti. Traditionally, the Bishop was one of several (unnamed) martyrs put to death by Muslim raiders in the early 9th century.

Their remains were later transferred the church at Mondovì, where Bernulf was venerated as patron saint of the town. That honor was later taken by the current patron saint, Saint Ubaldo.

His feast day is 24 March.

== Sources ==
- Sanctoral des RP Bénédictins, éditions Letouzey & Ané (1939)
