= Bernardo Landriani =

Roman Catholic prelate (died 1451)

Most Reverend Bernardo Landriani
- Bishop of Asti
- Church: Catholic Church
- Diocese: Diocese of Asti
- In office: 1446–1451
- Previous post: Bishop of Como (1439–1446)

Personal details
- Died: 1451 Como, Italy

Bernardo Landriani or Bernardo Landriano (died 1451) was a Roman Catholic prelate who served as Bishop of Asti (1446–1451) and Bishop of Como (1439–1446).

== Biography ==
On 31 August 1439, Bernardo Landriani was appointed during the papacy of Pope Eugene IV as Bishop of Asti. On 18 March 1446, he was appointed during the papacy of Pope Eugene IV as Bishop of Como. He served as Bishop of Como until his death in 1451.

== External links and additional sources ==
- Cheney, David M. "Diocese of Como". Catholic-Hierarchy.org. (for Chronology of Bishops) ^{[self-published]}
- Chow, Gabriel. "Diocese of Como (Italy)". GCatholic.org. (for Chronology of Bishops) ^{[self-published]}
- Cheney, David M. "Diocese of Asti". Catholic-Hierarchy.org. (for Chronology of Bishops) ^{[self-published]}
- Chow, Gabriel. "Diocese of Asti (Italy)". GCatholic.org. (for Chronology of Bishops) ^{[self-published]}

Catholic Church titles
Preceded by Gerardo Landriani	Bishop of Como; 1439–1446	Succeeded by Antonio Pusterla
Preceded by	Bishop of Asti; 1446–1451	Succeeded by
