= Giovanni Stefano Ajazza =

Roman Catholic prelate

Most Reverend Giovanni Stefano Ajazza
- Bishop of Asti
- Church: Catholic Church
- Diocese: Diocese of Asti
- In office: 1596–1618
- Predecessor: Caesar Benzio
- Successor: Isidoro Pentorio

Personal details
- Born: 1550
- Died: 1618 (age 68) Asti, Italy

Giovanni Stefano Ajazza or Giovanni Stefano Agathia or Giovanni Stefano Aiazza (1550–1618) was a Roman Catholic prelate who served as Bishop of Asti (1596–1618).

== Biography ==
Giovanni Stefano Ajazza was born in Vercellen in 1550. On 13 May 1596, he was appointed during the papacy of Pope Clement VIII as Bishop of Asti. He served as Bishop of Asti until his death in 1618.

== External links and additional sources ==
- Cheney, David M. "Diocese of Asti". Catholic-Hierarchy.org. (for Chronology of Bishops) ^{[self-published]}
- Chow, Gabriel. "Diocese of Asti (Italy)". GCatholic.org. (for Chronology of Bishops) ^{[self-published]}

Catholic Church titles
Preceded by Caesar Benzio	Bishop of Asti; 1596–1618	Succeeded by Isidoro Pentorio
