= Antonio Trivulzio (bishop) =

16th-century Roman Catholic bishop

Most Reverend Antonio Trivulzio
- Bishop of Como
- Church: Catholic Church
- Diocese: Diocese of Como
- In office: 1518–1519
- Predecessor: Scaramuccia Trivulzio
- Successor: Cesare Trivulzio
- Previous posts: Bishop of Asti (1499–1508 and 1509–1518); Bishop of Piacenza (1508–1509)

Personal details
- Died: 1519

Antonio Trivulzio (died 1519) was a Roman Catholic prelate who served as Bishop of Como (1518–1519), Bishop of Piacenza (1508–1509), Bishop of Asti (1499–1508 and 1509–1518).

== Biography ==
On 26 Jul 1499, he was appointed during the papacy of Pope Alexander VI as Bishop of Asti. On 31 Jul 1508, he was transferred by Pope Julius II to the Diocese of Piacenza. On 9 Jan 1509, he was transferred by Pope Julius II again to the Diocese of Asti. On 8 Jan 1518, he was transferred by Pope Leo X as Diocese of Como. He served as Bishop of Como until his death in 1519.

== External links and additional sources ==
- Cheney, David M. "Diocese of Asti". Catholic-Hierarchy.org. (for Chronology of Bishops) ^{[self-published]}
- Chow, Gabriel. "Diocese of Asti (Italy)". GCatholic.org. (for Chronology of Bishops) ^{[self-published]}
- Cheney, David M. "Diocese of Piacenza-Bobbio". Catholic-Hierarchy.org. (for Chronology of Bishops) ^{[self-published]}
- Chow, Gabriel. "Diocese of Piacenza-Bobbio (Italy)". GCatholic.org. (for Chronology of Bishops) ^{[self-published]}
- Cheney, David M. "Diocese of Como". Catholic-Hierarchy.org. (for Chronology of Bishops) ^{[self-published]}
- Chow, Gabriel. "Diocese of Como (Italy)". GCatholic.org. (for Chronology of Bishops) ^{[self-published]}

Catholic Church titles
Preceded by Raffaele di Ceva	Bishop of Asti (1st term); 1499–1508	Succeeded by Albertino della Rovere
Preceded by Fabrizio Marliani	Bishop of Piacenza; 1508–1509	Succeeded by Vasino Malabayla
Preceded by Albertino della Rovere	Bishop of Asti (2nd term); 1509–1518	Succeeded by Vasino Malabayla
Preceded by Scaramuccia Trivulzio	Bishop of Como; 1518–1519	Succeeded by Cesare Trivulzio
