= Diocese of Como =

Roman Catholic diocese in Italy

Diocese of Como Dioecesis Comensis

Catholic
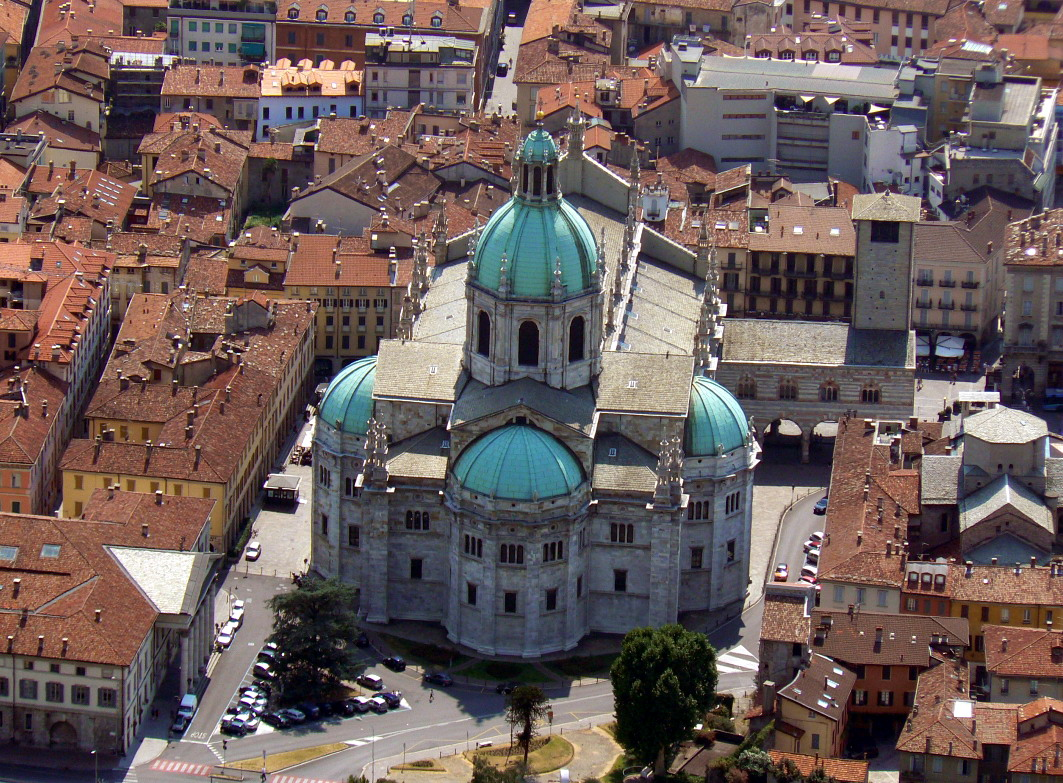
- Aerial view of the cathedral in Como

Location
- Country: Italy
- Ecclesiastical province: Milan

Statistics
- Area: 4,244 km^{2} (1,639 sq mi)
- Population: Total; Catholics: (as of 2023); 544,000 (est.) ▼; 525,000 (est.) ▼
- Parishes: 338

Information
- Denomination: Catholic Church
- Sui iuris church: Latin Church
- Rite: Roman Rite
- Established: 4th Century
- Cathedral: Basilica Cattedrale di S. Maria Assunta
- Secular priests: 304 (diocesan) ▼130 (Religious Orders) ▲17 Permanent Deacons ▲

Current leadership
- Pope: Leo XIV
- Bishop: Oscar Cantoni
- Bishops emeritus: Diego Coletti

Map

Website
- Diocesi di Como (in Italian)

The Diocese of Como (Latin: Dioecesis Comensis) is a Latin Church ecclesiastical jurisdiction or diocese of the Catholic Church in northern Italy. It was established in the Fourth Century. It is a suffragan diocese in the ecclesiastical province of the metropolitan Archdiocese of Milan. The Bishop of Como's cathedra is in the Como Cathedral.

Local legend credits the conversion of Como to the apostolate of Hermagoras of Aquileia (died c. 70).

The diocese of Como was originally suffragan of Milan, as the consecration of its first bishop by Ambrose of Milan demonstrates. By the mid 6th century the diocese was subject to Aquileia. Pope Stephen V (885-891) twice ordered Patriarch Walpert of Aquileia to consecrate Liutard, the Bishop-elect of Como. Until 1751 Como was, indeed, a suffragan of the patriarchate of Aquileia and followed the Aquileian Rite; the Patriarchate was suppressed by Pope Benedict XIV, who, on 18 April 1752, created the Archdiocese of Gorizia, and made Como subject to Gorizia. In 1789 Como was placed under the jurisdiction of the Archbishop of Milan by Pope Pius VI.

== History ==
From the 6th century to the 15th, the rite of Aquileia, commonly called the patriarchal rite, was used in the Church of Como. It was only in 1598 that Pope Clement VIII substituted the Roman rite.

In the tenth century the Bishops of Como were also its temporal lords. From the election of Bishop Raimundus in 1061, the episcopal elections were carried out by the Canons of the Cathedral Chapter and the Abbots of S. Carpoforo, S. Abondio, and S. Giuliano.

Como lost a relevant part of its territory to the newly formed Diocese of Lugano in 1884.

=== Cathedral and Chapter ===
The Cathedral of S. Maria Assunta was begun in 1396, and was completed only in 1595; later the cupola and some small chapels were added (1730–44). The Cathedral was granted the honorary title and privileges of a minor basilica by Pope Pius XII, at the request of Bishop Felix Bonomini, in a decree of 18 January 1951.

In 1695, the Chapter of the cathedral was composed of three dignities (the Archdeacon, the Archpriest, and the Provost) and twenty Canons. In 1764, there were three dignities and seventeen Canons. In 1846 there were twenty members of the Chapter, headed by the Archpriest, the Theologos, and the Penitentiary. The Chapter of the Cathedral currently (2018) consists of ten Canons, headed by the Archpriest.

In the city of Como there was also the Collegiate Church of S. Fedele, which was presided over by a Provost and seven Canons.

=== Synods ===
A diocesan synod was an irregular but important meeting of the bishop of a diocese and his clergy. Its purpose was (1) to proclaim generally the various decrees already issued by the bishop; (2) to discuss and ratify measures on which the bishop chose to consult with his clergy; (3) to publish statutes and decrees of the diocesan synod, of the provincial synod, and of the Holy See.

Bishop Gianantonio Volpi (1559–1588) held a diocesan synod on 16 March 1565. This was the first synod since the closing of the Council of Trent, which had mandated regular and frequent diocesan synods. He held a second synod on 3–5 September 1579. A diocesan synod was held by Bishop Filippo Archinti (1595–1621) in 1598; and another synod on 16–18 May 1618.

The Fifth Diocesan Synod was held by Bishop Lazzaro Carafino (1626–1665) on 18–20 September 1633. The Sixth Diocesan Synod was held by Bishop Ambrogio Torriano (1680–1694) on 13–15 September 1672. It issued particularly strong regulations against the use of snuff by the clergy, following the decree of Pope Innocent X, and prescribed a fine of two aurei for any priest who used snuff before the Mass. The Seventh Diocesan Synod was held on 10–12 September 1682 by Cardinal Carlo Cicero, Bishop of Como.

Bishop Teodoro de Valfrè held a diocesan synod on 13–15 September 1904 in the Cathedral. The Ninth Diocesan Synod was held by Bishop Alessandro Macchi (1930–1947) on 8–10 September 1942. The Tenth Diocesan Synod was held by Bishop Felice Bonomini (1948–1974) in 1953. Bishop Oscar Cantoni announced the Eleventh Diocesan Synod, that was to take place in 2020. It concluded in May 2022.

== Bishops of Como ==
=== to 1000 ===
- Felix of Como (c. 379 – c. 391)
- Provinus (Probinus, Prouinus) (391–420)
- Amantius of Como (420–450)
- Abundius (or Abundantius) (attested 450–489)
- Console (489–495)
- Exuperantius (495–512)
- Eusebius (512–525)
- Eutychius (Eutichio) (525–539)
- Eupilius (approx. 539)
- Flavianus I
- Prosper
- Joannes (c. 607)
- Agrippinus (607–617)
- Rubianus
- Adalbert
- Martiniano
- Vittorino (approx. 628)
- John II
- John III
- Ottaviano
- Benedict I
- Flaviano II (approx. 712)
- Adeodato (712–730)
- Gausoaldo (approx. 730)
- Angilbert I (approx. 750)
- Lupo (approx. 750)
- Teodolfo
- Adelongo (approx. 776)
- Peter I (776–818)
- Leo I (attested 823–838)
- Perideo (840–843)
- Amalrico (844–865)
- Angilbert II (866–880)
- Luitardus (Liutardo) (attested 888–905)
- Valperto I (attested 911–914)
- Valperto II (915)
- Peter II (921)
- Azzone (922–945)
- Waldo (Ubaldus) (946–966)
- Adelgisius (attested 973–977)
- Peter III (attested 983–1005)

=== 1000 to 1300 ===
- Eberhardus (attested 1004–1006)
- Albericus (c. 1010 – c. 1028)
- Liudger (1030/32–1046)
- Benno (attested 1049–1061)
- Rainaldo (1061/62–1084)
- Aribertus (1085–1088)

Hartwicus (attested 1092)

- Guido Grimoldi (1098–1125)

[Landulfus de Carcano (1098–1118)]

- Ardizzo I (1125–1158)
- Enrico della Torre (1158–1162)
- Anselmo Raimundi (della Torre) (1163–1193)
- Ardizzone II (1193–1204)
- Guglielmo della Torre (1204–1226)
- Uberto di Sala (1228–1259)
- Leone degli Avvocati (1259–1261)
- Raimondo della Torre (1261–1273)
- Giovanni degli Avvocati (1274–1293)
- Leone Lambertenghi (1294–1325)

=== 1300 to 1600 ===
- Benedetto di Asinago, O.P. (1328–1339)
- Beltramino Paravicini (1339–1340)
- Bonifacio da Modena (1340–1351)
- Bernard, O.Cist. (1352–1357)
- Andrea degli Avvocati (1357–1361)
- Stefano Gatti (1362–1369)
- Enrico da Sessa (1369–1380)
- Beltramo da Brossano (1380–1395)
- Lucchino da Brossano or Borsano (1396–1408)
- Antonio Turcone (1409–1420)
- Francesco Bossi (1420–1434)
- Bernardo Candiani (1434-1436), then bishop of Pavia until 1443
- Giovanni Barbavara (1436–1437)
- Gerardo Landriani (1437–1445)
- Bernardo Landriani (1446–1451)
- Antonio Pusterla (1451–1457)
- Martino Pusterla (1457–1460)
- Lazzaro Scarampi (1460–1466)
- Branda Castiglione (1466–1487)
- Cardinal Antonio Trivulzio (1487–1508)
- Scaramuccia Trivulzio (1508–1527)
- Antonio Trivulzio (1518–1519)
- Cesare Trivulzio (1519–1548)
- Bernardino della Croce (1548–1559)
- Gianantonio Volpi (1559–1588)
- Feliciano Ninguarda (1588–1595)
- Filippo Archinto (bishop) (1595–1621)

=== 1600 to 1800 ===
- Aurelio Archinti (1621–1622)
- Desiderio Scaglia, O.P. (1622–1625)
- Lazzaro Carafino (1626–1665)
- Ambrogio Torriano (1680–1694)
- Carlo Ciceri (1680–1694)
- Stefano Giuseppe Menatti (1694–1695)
- Francesco Bonesana (1696–1709)
- Giuseppe Olgiati (1710–1735)
- Alberico Simonetta (1736–1739)
- Paolo Cernuschi (1739–1746)
- Agostino M. Neuroni (1746–1760)
- Giovanni Battista Peregrini (1760–1764)
- Giambattista Mugiasca (1764–1789)
- Giuseppe Bertieri, O.E.S.A. (1790–1792)
- Carlo Rovelli, O.P. (1793–1819)

=== since 1800 ===
- Giambattista Castelnuovo (1821–1831)

Sede Vacante (December 1831–January 1834)

- Carlo Romanò (1834–1855)
- Giuseppe Marzorati (1858–1865)
- Pietro Carsana (1871–1887)
- Luigi Nicora (1887–1890)
- Andrea Carlo Ferrari (1891–1894)
- Teodoro Valfrè di Bonzo (1895–1905)
- Alfonso Archi (1905–1925)
- Adolfo Luigi Pagani (1926–1930)
- Alessandro Macchi (1930–1947)
- Felice Bonomini (1947–1974)
- Teresio Ferraroni (1974–1989)
- Alessandro Maggiolini (1989–2006)
- Diego Coletti (2006–2016)
- Cardinal Oscar Cantoni (2016 – )

== Parishes ==
The 338 parishes of the diocese are spread across four provinces of the Lombardy region: the Province of Como, the Province of Lecco, the Province of Sondrio, and the Province of Varese. There is one priest for every 1,156 Catholics (2021).

== Books ==
=== Reference works ===
- Gams, Pius Bonifatius (1873). Series episcoporum Ecclesiae catholicae: quotquot innotuerunt a beato Petro apostolo. Ratisbon: Typis et Sumptibus Georgii Josephi Manz. pp. 786–789.
- Eubel, Conradus, ed. (1913). Hierarchia catholica (in Latin). Vol. Tomus 1 (second ed.). Münster: Libreria Regensbergiana. p. 217.
- Eubel, Conradus, ed. (1914). Hierarchia catholica (in Latin). Vol. Tomus II (second ed.). Münster: Libreria Regensbergiana. p. 140.
- Eubel, Conradus; Gulik, Guilelmus (1923). Hierarchia catholica (in Latin). Vol. Tomus III (second ed.). Münster: Libreria Regensbergiana. pp. 182–183.
- Gauchat, Patritius (Patrice) (1935). Hierarchia catholica (in Latin). Vol. IV (1592-1667). Münster: Libraria Regensbergiana. pp. 157–158.
- Ritzler, Remigius; Sefrin, Pirminus (1952). Hierarchia catholica medii et recentis aevi (in Latin). Vol. V (1667-1730). Patavii: Messagero di S. Antonio. p. 166.
- Ritzler, Remigius; Sefrin, Pirminus (1958). Hierarchia catholica medii et recentis aevi (in Latin). Vol. VI (1730-1799). Patavii: Messagero di S. Antonio. pp. 175–176.
- Ritzler, Remigius; Sefrin, Pirminus (1968). Hierarchia Catholica medii et recentioris aevi sive summorum pontificum, S. R. E. cardinalium, ecclesiarum antistitum series... A pontificatu Pii PP. VII (1800) usque ad pontificatum Gregorii PP. XVI (1846) (in Latin). Vol. VII. Monasterii: Libr. Regensburgiana.
- Remigius Ritzler; Pirminus Sefrin (1978). Hierarchia catholica Medii et recentioris aevi... A Pontificatu PII PP. IX (1846) usque ad Pontificatum Leonis PP. XIII (1903) (in Latin). Vol. VIII. Il Messaggero di S. Antonio.
- Pięta, Zenon (2002). Hierarchia catholica medii et recentioris aevi... A pontificatu Pii PP. X (1903) usque ad pontificatum Benedictii PP. XV (1922) (in Latin). Vol. IX. Padua: Messagero di San Antonio. ISBN 978-88-250-1000-8.

=== Studies ===
- Cantù, Cesare (1856). Storia della città e della diocesi di Como (in Italian). Vol. I. Firenze: Le Monnier.
- Cantù, Cesare (1856). Storia della città e della diocesi di Como (in Italian). Vol. II. Firenze: Felice Le Monnier.
- Cappelletti, Giuseppe (1856). Le chiese d'Italia della loro origine sino ai nostri giorni (in Italian). Vol. undecimo (XI). Venezia: Giuseppe Antonelli. pp. 307–443.
- Caprioli, Adriano; Rimoldi, Antonio; Vaccaro, Luciano (1986). Diocesi di Como (in Italian). Brescia: La Scuola. ISBN 978-88-350-7761-9.
- Giusti, Guido Paolo (1980). Chiese e vescovi di Como (in Italian). Como.
- Kehr, Paul Fridolin (1913). Italia pontificia : sive, Repertorium privilegiorum et litterarum a romanis pontificibus ante annum 1598 Italiae ecclesiis, monasteriis, civitatibus singulisque personis concessorum. Vol. VI. pars i. Berolini: Weidmann. pp. 398–418. (in Latin).
- Lanzoni, Francesco (1927). Le diocesi d'Italia dalle origini al principio del secolo VII (an. 604), vol. II, Faenza 1927. (in Italian)
- Orsini, Giustino Renato (1955). "La giurisdizione spirituale e temporale del vescovo di Como," Archivio storico Lombardo Serie ottava. 5 (1954–1955), pp. 3–63. (in Italian)
- Peri-Morosini, Alfredo (1892). La questione diocesana ticinese, ovvero Origine della Diocesi di Lugano (in Italian). Einsiedeln: Benziger & Company.
- Tatti, Primo Luigi (1683). Degli annali sacri della città di Como (in Italian). Vol. Decade seconda. Milano: Giovanni Battista Ferrario.
- Schwartz, Gerhard (1913). Die Besetzung der Bistümer Reichsitaliens unter den Sächsischen und Salischen Kaisern Teil I and Teil II A. Leipzig: Teubner. (in German)
- Tatti, Primo Luigi; Stampa, Giuseppe Maria (1734). Degli annali sacri della città di Como (in Italian) (Deca terza ed.). Milano: Caprani.
- Turazza, G. (1930). La successione dei vescovi di Como dal 379 al 1930 (in Italian). Como: Arti Grafiche Emo Cavalleri.
- Ughelli, Ferdinando; Coleti, Niccolo (1720). Italia Sacra sive De Episcopis Italiae et insularum adjacentium: tomus quintus (in Latin). Vol. Tomus quintus (V). Venice: apud Sebastianum Coleti. pp. 255–322.
