= Basilica of Sant'Abbondio =

Church building in Como, Italy

Coordinates: 45°48′9.07″N 9°04′49.42″E

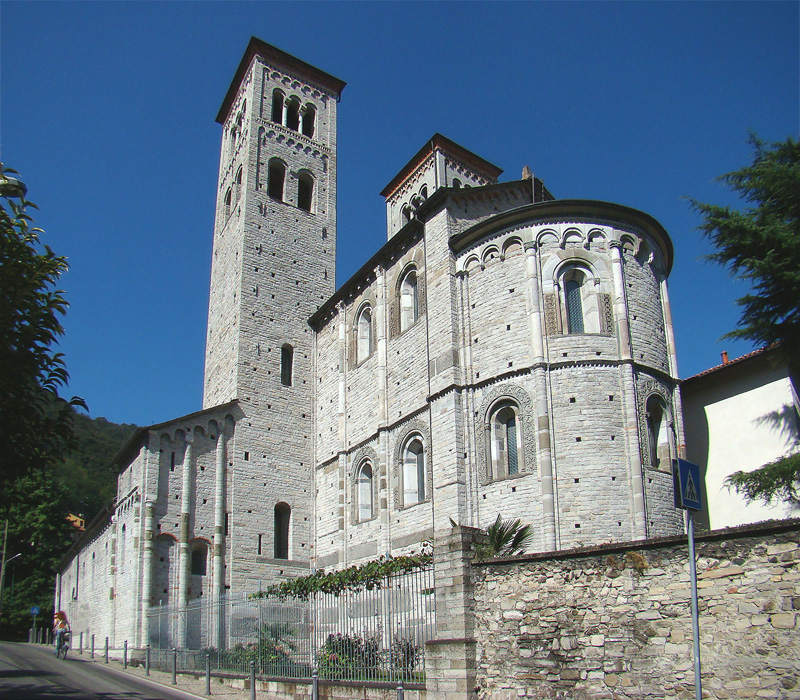
Apse area.

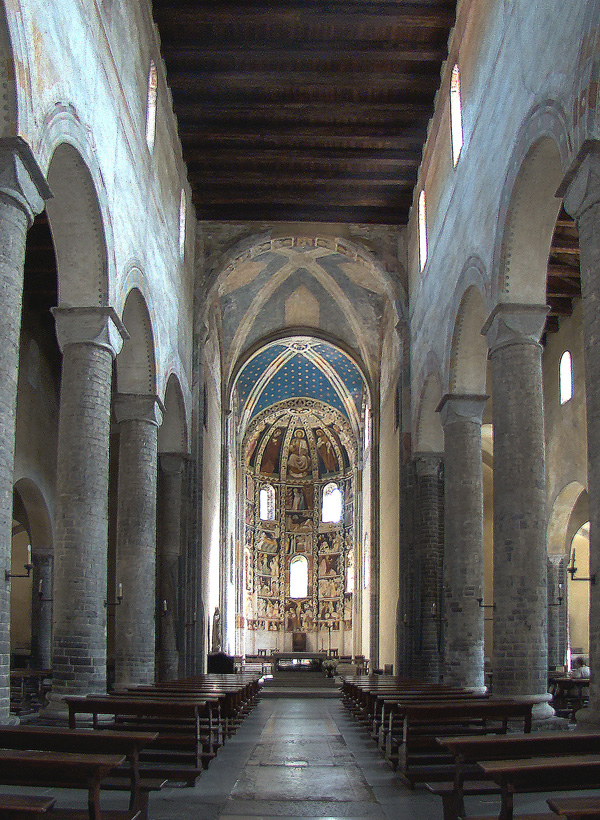
Internal view of the nave.

The Basilica of Sant'Abbondio is a Romanesque-style 11th-century Catholic basilica church located in Como, region of Lombardy, Italy.

== Description ==
The Basilica was built in the on a previous 5th-century early Christian church dedicated to Saints Peter and Paul. It was built by order of St. Amantius of Como, third bishop of the city, and was meant to house several relics associated with Peter and Paul, which Amantius had brought from Rome.

In the 9th century the complex was dedicated to Bishop Abundius, who had been buried there four centuries earlier.

The basilica acted as the bishop's seat until 1007. Six years later bishop Alberic moved the seat within the walls of Como. The basilica was then entrusted to the Benedictines who, between 1050 and 1095, dismantled the early Christian church and rebuilt it in the Romanesque style. In 1095 the newly constructed basilica was consecrated by Pope Urban II.

Since 1863, the Basilica has been the subject of a major restoration project conducted by Serafino Balestra. Balestra, a teacher at the seminaries of Como, sought to restore the Romanesque appearance of the Basilica by removing additions made during the 16th century. One prominent restoration was the rebuilding of one of the bell towers. In 1784 the northern bell tower had almost completely collapsed, Balestra had the tower rebuilt to match the surviving tower, despite there being no record of the appearance of the tower before its damage. The restoration also unearth the foundation of the 5th-century early Christian church, which Balestra marked with marble slabs that are still visible on the Basilica's floor today.

The Basilica has two notable bell towers rising at the end of the external aisles, in the middle of the nave. The sober façade, once preceded by a portico, has seven windows and a portal. Notable is the external decoration of the choir's windows. There are also Romanesque bas-reliefs and, in the apse, a notable cycle of mid-14th-century frescoes. Under the high altar are the Abundius' relics.

The Municipality of Como purchased the Basilica in 1974, and has since overseen its restoration and redevelopment. Currently, it is the seat of the Faculty of Law of the University of Insubria.
