= Antonio Trivulzio, seniore =

Italian bishop and cardinal

His Eminence Antonio Trivulzio
- Cardinal-Priest of Santo Stefano al Monte Celio
- Church: Catholic Church

Personal details
- Born: January 18, 1457 Milan, Italy
- Died: March 18, 1508 (aged 51) Rome, Italy

Antonio Trivulzio the Elder (It.: Antonio Trivulzio, seniore) (1457–1508) (called the Cardinal of Como) was an Italian Roman Catholic bishop and cardinal.

== Biography ==
Antonio Trivulzio, seniore, was born in Milan on January 18, 1457, the son of Milanese patricians Pietro Trivulzio and Laura Bossi. He was the brother of Teodoro Trivulzio, marshal of France, and the uncle of Cardinal Agostino Trivulzio.

After obtaining a doctorate in law, he joined the Canons Regular at Sant'Antonio in Milan. He was ordained as a priest around this time. He went on to become the master of the Augustinian house of Sant'Antonio in Milan.

He also served on the privy council of Gian Galeazzo Sforza, Duke of Milan. In 1477, he served as the ambassador of the Duchy of Milan to Parma and in 1483, as its ambassador in Rome. Settling in Rome, he became first a protonotary apostolic and then an Auditor of the Roman Rota.

On August 27, 1487, he was elected Bishop of Como; he subsequently held this office until his death.

In 1495, he served as Milan's ambassador to the Republic of Venice. In 1499, following the downfall of Ludovico Sforza, he became one of the regents of Milan. Sometime between 1499 and 1502, he became dean of the cathedral chapter of St. Donatian's Cathedral in Bruges.

During the Italian Wars, he allied himself with Louis XII of France. At Louis' request, Pope Alexander VI made him a cardinal priest in the consistory of September 28, 1500. He received the red hat on October 2, 1500, and the titular church of the Basilica di Sant'Anastasia al Palatino on October 5, 1500. He also became a member of the Senate of Milan in 1500.

He participated in both the papal conclave of September 1503 that elected Pope Pius III and the papal conclave of October 1503 that elected Pope Julius II.

He was Camerlengo of the Sacred College of Cardinals from 1505 to 1506. On December 1, 1505, he opted for the titular church of Santo Stefano Rotondo.

He died in Rome on March 18, 1508. He is buried in Santa Maria del Popolo.

Catholic Church titles
Preceded by Brande Castiglioni	Bishop of Como; 1487–1508	Succeeded by Scaramuccia Trivulzio
Preceded by John Morton	Cardinal-Priest of Sant'Anastasia; 1500–1505	Succeeded by Robert Guibé
Preceded by Jaime de Casanova	Cardinal-Priest of Santo Stefano al Monte Celio; 1505	Succeeded by Melchior von Meckau
Preceded by Juan de Vera	Camerlengo of the Sacred College of Cardinals; 1505	Succeeded by Gianstefano Ferrero
