= Marco Antonio Tomati (bishop of Asti) =

Italian Roman Catholic prelate

Most Reverend Marco Antonio Tomati
- Bishop of Asti
- Church: Catholic Church
- Diocese: Diocese of Asti
- In office: 1666–1693
- Predecessor: Paolo Vincenzo Rovero
- Successor: Innocenzo Migliavacca

Personal details
- Born: Caravonica, Italy
- Died: 7 January 1693 Asti, Italy

Marco Antonio Tomati or Marc'Antonio Tomati (unknown – 7 January 1693) was a Roman Catholic prelate who served as Bishop of Asti.

== Biography ==
Marco Antonio Tomati was born in Caravonica, Italy on 5 January 1583. On 11 January 1666, he was appointed during the papacy of Pope Alexander VII as Bishop of Asti. He served as Bishop of Asti until his death on 7 January 1693.

== External links and additional sources ==
- Cheney, David M. "Diocese of Asti". Catholic-Hierarchy.org. (for Chronology of Bishops) ^{[self-published]}
- Chow, Gabriel. "Diocese of Asti (Italy)". GCatholic.org. (for Chronology of Bishops) ^{[self-published]}

Catholic Church titles
| Preceded by Paolo Vincenzo Rovero | Bishop of Asti; 1666–1693 | Succeeded by Innocenzo Migliavacca |
