= Innocenzo Migliavacca =

Roman Catholic prelate

Most Reverend Innocenzo Migliavacca
- Bishop of Asti
- Church: Catholic Church
- Diocese: Diocese of Asti
- In office: 1693–1714
- Predecessor: Marco Antonio Tomati
- Successor: Giovanni Todone

Orders
- Ordination: 15 June 1658
- Consecration: 14 June 1693 by Marcantonio Barbarigo

Personal details
- Born: 16 July 1635 Milan, Italy
- Died: 21 February 1714 (age 78) Asti, Italy

Innocenzo Migliavacca, O. Cist. or Innocenzo Milliavacca (16 July 1635 – 21 February 1714) was a Roman Catholic prelate who served as Bishop of Asti (1693–1714).

== Biography ==
Innocenzo Migliavacca was born in Milan, Italy on 16 July 1635. He was ordained a deacon in the Cistercian Order on 16 July 1635 and then ordained a priest on 15 June 1658. On 8 June 1693, he was appointed during the papacy of Pope Innocent XII as Bishop of Asti. On 14 June 1693, he was consecrated bishop by Marcantonio Barbarigo, Bishop of Corneto e Montefiascone with Ercole Domenico Monanni, Bishop of Terracina, Priverno e Sezze, and Giovanni Battista Visconti Aicardi, Bishop of Novara, serving as co-consecrators. He served as Bishop of Asti until his death on 21 February 1714.

== External links and additional sources ==
- Cheney, David M. "Diocese of Asti". Catholic-Hierarchy.org. (for Chronology of Bishops) ^{[self-published]}
- Chow, Gabriel. "Diocese of Asti (Italy)". GCatholic.org. (for Chronology of Bishops) ^{[self-published]}

Catholic Church titles
| Preceded by Marco Antonio Tomati | Bishop of Asti; 1693–1714 | Succeeded by Giovanni Todone |
