= Amantius of Como =

Italian Roman Catholic saint

Saint Amantius of Como
- Born: Canzo
- Died: 8 April 448; Como
- Venerated in: Roman Catholicism, Eastern Orthodox Church
- Feast: 8 April

Amantius of Como (Italian: Sant'Amanzio di Como) (died April 8, 448 AD) is venerated as the third bishop of Como. He was preceded by Felix of Como and Provinus. He was succeeded by Abundius. His feast day is 8 April.

== Biography ==
A late legend, based on a naive reading of the toponym Cantium, says he was born in Canterbury, and served as an imperial dignitary before becoming a bishop. The legend continues he was a relative of Theodosius II through his mother. He is credited with building the original Basilica of Sant'Abbondio outside of the city walls of Como. The basilica was built to house several relics associated with Peter and Paul, which Amantius had brought from Rome.

== Veneration ==
His relics were preserved at Sant'Abbondio until July 2, 1590, when they were transferred to the Chiesa del Gesù in Como. The relics were later transferred to the church of San Fedele in Como, where they remain today.

== Bibliography ==
- Siro Borrani, Il Ticino Sacro. Memorie religiose della Svizzera Italiana raccolte dal sacerdote Siro Borrani prevosto di Losone, Lugani, Tip. e Libreria Cattolica di Giovanni Grassi, 1896.
- Adriano Caprioli, Antonio Rimoldi, Luciano Vaccaro, Diocesi di Como, Brescia, Editrice La Scuola, 1986, ISBN 88-350-7761-3.
