= Brande Castiglioni =

15th-century Catholic bishop

Most Reverend Brande Castiglioni
- Bishop of Como
- Church: Catholic Church
- Diocese: Diocese of Como
- In office: 1415–1487
- Predecessor: Lazzaro Scarampi
- Successor: Antonio Trivulzio (seniore)

Orders
- Consecration: 19 October 1466 by Guillaume d'Estouteville

Personal details
- Born: 1415 Milan, Italy
- Died: 1487 (age 72) Como, Italy

Brande Castiglioni or Branda Castiglioni (1415–1487) was a Roman Catholic prelate who served as Bishop of Como (1415–1487).

== Biography ==
Brande Castiglioni was born in Milan, Italy in 1415. On 8 October 1466, he was appointed during the papacy of Pope Paul II as Bishop of Como. On 19 October 1466, he was consecrated bishop by Guillaume d'Estouteville, Cardinal-Bishop of Ostia e Velletri, with Philippe de Lévis, Archbishop of Arles, and Jean L'Espervier, Bishop of Saint-Malo, serving as co-consecrators. He served as Bishop of Como until his death on 16 July 1487.

== External links and additional sources ==
- Cheney, David M. "Diocese of Como". Catholic-Hierarchy.org. (for Chronology of Bishops) ^{[self-published]}
- Chow, Gabriel. "Diocese of Como (Italy)". GCatholic.org. (for Chronology of Bishops) ^{[self-published]}

Catholic Church titles
Preceded by Lazzaro Scarampi	Bishop of Como; 1415–1487	Succeeded by Antonio Trivulzio (seniore)
