= Scaramuccia Trivulzio =

Italian Catholic cardinal (1465-1527)

His Eminence Scaramuccia Trivulzio
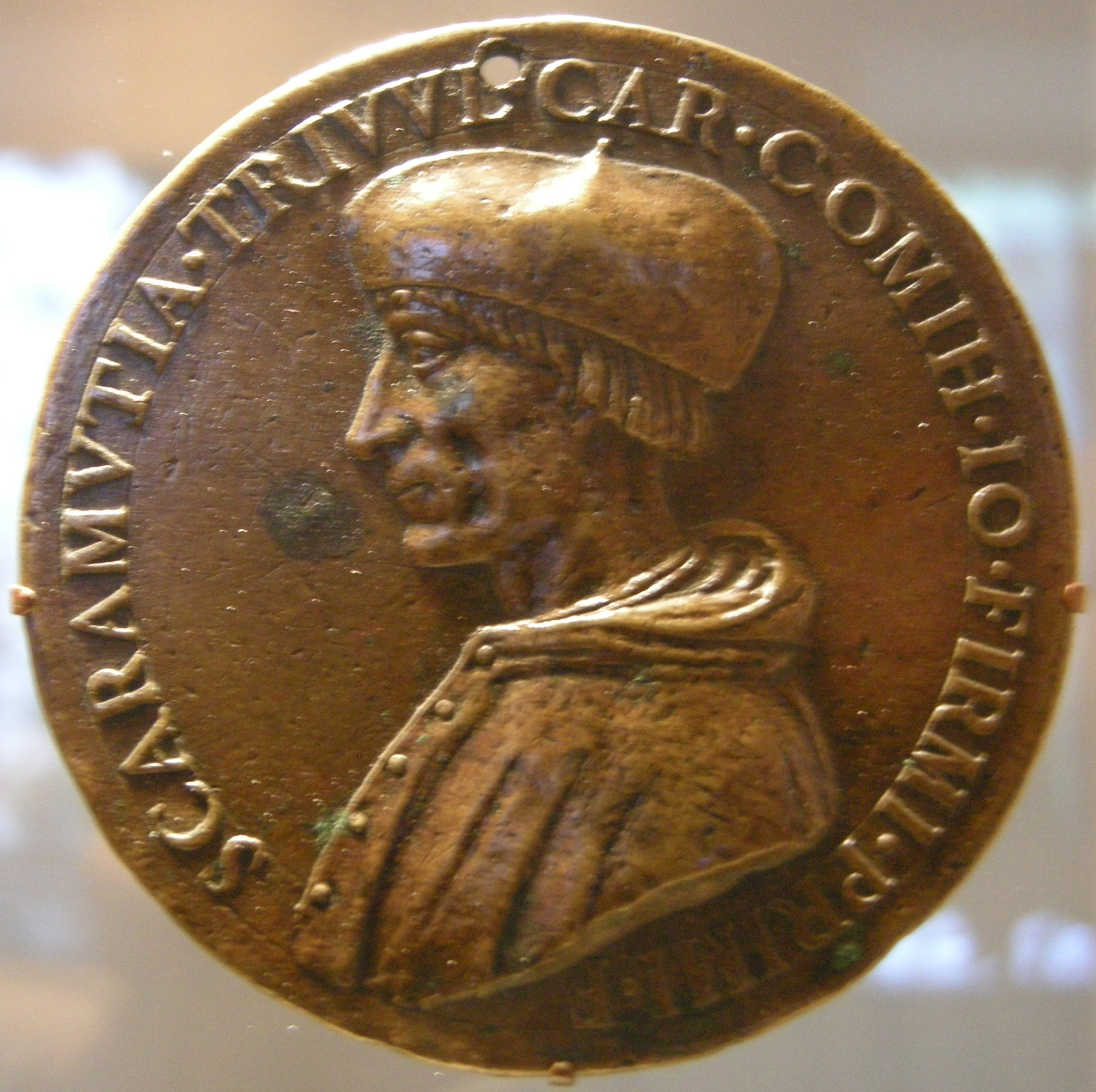
- Coin depicting Scaramuccia Trivulzio
- Church: Catholic Church

Personal details
- Born: 1465 Milan, Italy
- Died: 3 Aug 1527 (age 62) Verona, Italy

Scaramuccia Trivulzio (1465 – 3 August 1527) was a cardinal of the Catholic Church. He was Bishop of Como in Italy, from 1508 to 1518. He was then Bishop of Piacenza, from 1519 to 1525.

He was made cardinal in July 1517 by Pope Leo X. It was his fifth consistory.

Catholic Church titles
Preceded by Antonio Trivulzio (seniore)	Bishop of Como; 1508–1518	Succeeded by Antonio Trivulzio (bishop)
Preceded by Pietro Isvalies	Cardinal-Priest of San Ciriaco alle Terme Diocleziane; 1517–1527	Succeeded by Agostino Spínola
Preceded by Vasino Malabayla	Administrator of Piacenza; 1519–1525	Succeeded by Catalano Trivulzio
Preceded by Alessandro Sanseverino	Administrator of Vienne; 1527	Succeeded by Pierre Palmier
