= Cardinals created by Clement VII =

Catholic appointments from 1527 to 1533

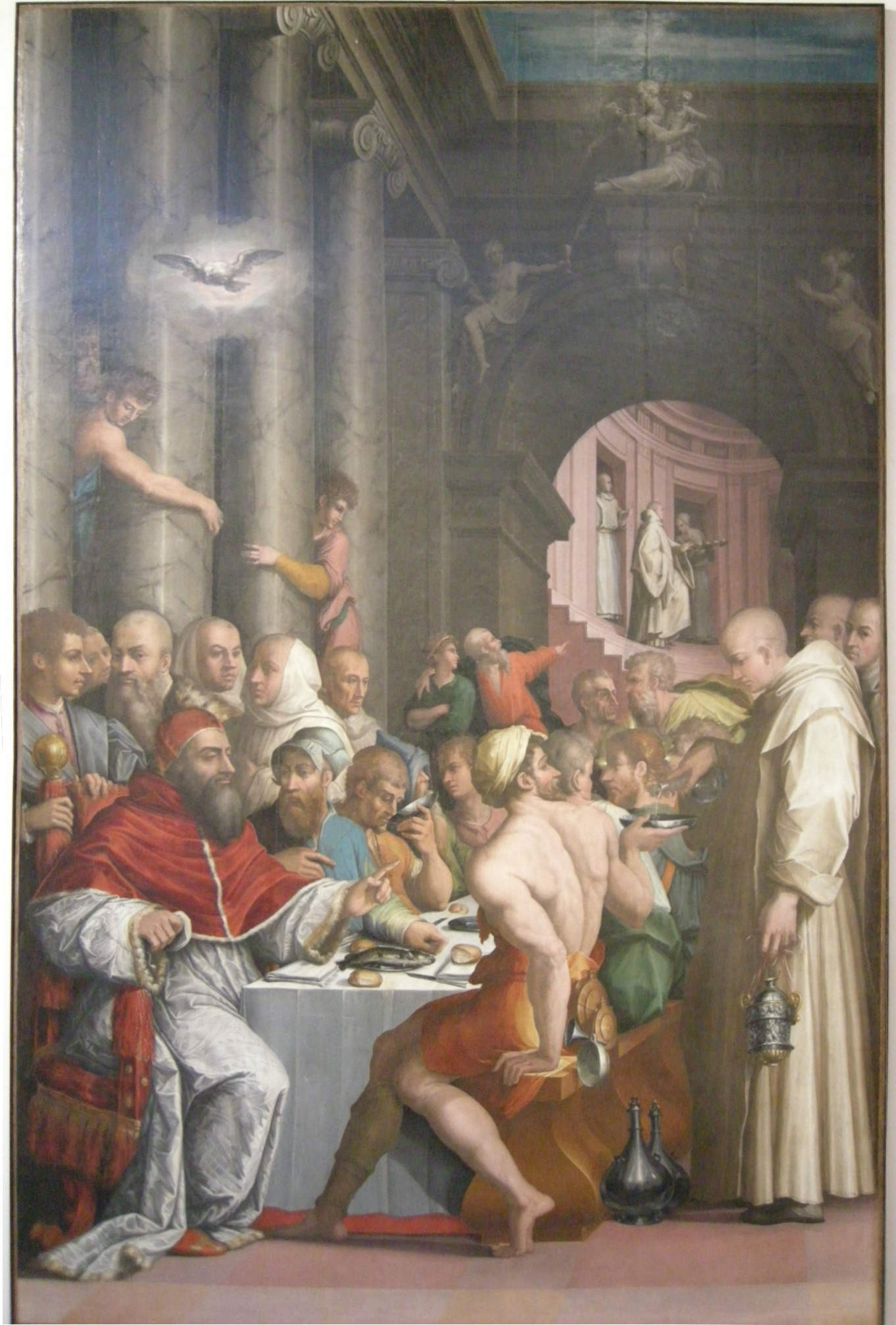
Pope Clement VII (1478–1534).

Pope Clement VII (r. 1523–1534) created 32 new cardinals:

== Consistory of 3 May 1527 ==
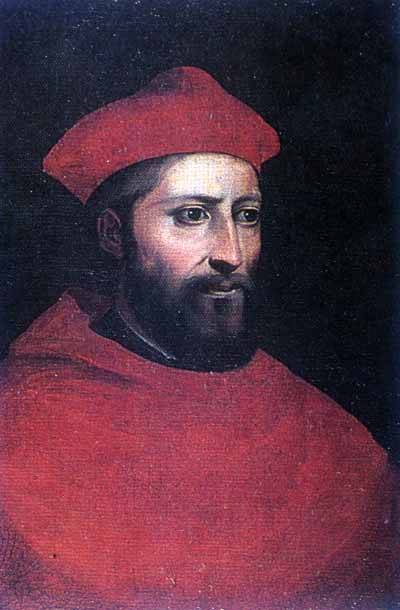
Benedetto Accolti (1497–1549), made a cardinal on May 3, 1527.

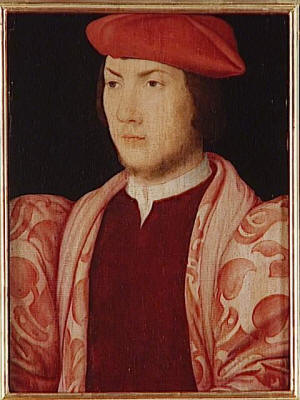
Niccolò Gaddi (1499–1552), made a cardinal on May 3, 1527.

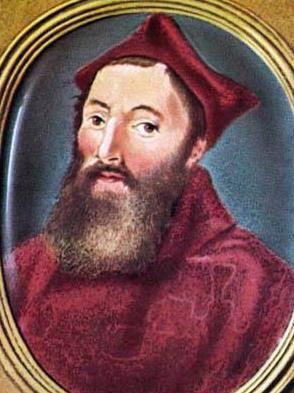
Marino Grimani (c1489-1546), made a cardinal on May 3, 1527.

1. Benedetto Accolti, archbishop of Ravenna – cardinal-priest of S. Eusebio (received the title on 5 May 1527), † 21 September 1549
2. Agostino Spinola, bishop of Perugia – cardinal-priest of S. Ciriaco (received the title on 3 August 1527), then cardinal-priest of S. Apollinare (5 September 1534), † 18 October 1537
3. Niccolò Gaddi, elect of Fermo – cardinal-deacon of S. Teodoro, then cardinal-deacon of SS. Vito e Modesto (9 January 1545), cardinal-deacon of S. Maria in Domnica (28 February 1550), cardinal-deacon of S. Maria in Via Lata (27 June 1550), cardinal-priest of S. Maria in Via Lata (20 November 1551), † 16 January 1552
4. Ercole Gonzaga, bishop of Mantua – cardinal-deacon of S. Maria Nuova (received the title on 5 May 1527), then cardinal-priest of S. Maria Nuova (6 July 1556), † 3 March 1563
5. Marino Grimani, patriarch of Aquileia – cardinal-priest of S. Vitale (received the title on 7 February 1528), then cardinal-priest of S. Marcello (12 November 1532), cardinal-priest of S. Maria in Trastevere (4 August 1539), cardinal-bishop of Frascati (13 March 1541), cardinal-bishop of Porto e S. Rufina (24 September 1543), † 28 September 1546

== Consistory of 21 November 1527 ==
1. Antonio Sanseverino, O.S.Io.Hieros. – cardinal-priest of S. Susanna (received the title on 27 April 1528), then cardinal-priest of S. Apollinare (16 May 1530), cardinal-priest of S. Maria in Trastevere (5 September 1534), cardinal-bishop of Palestrina (28 November 1537), cardinal-bishop of Sabina (4 August 1539), cardinal-bishop of Porto e S. Rufina (8 January 1543), † 17 August 1543
2. Gianvincenzo Carafa, archbishop of Naples – cardinal-priest of S. Pudenziana (received the title on 27 April 1528), then cardinal-priest of S. Prisca (23 July 1537), cardinal-priest of S. Maria in Trastevere (28 November 1537), cardinal-bishop of Palestrina (4 August 1539), † 28 August 1541
3. Andrea Matteo Palmieri, archbishop of Acerenza e Matera – cardinal-priest of S. Clemente (received the title on 21 November 1527), † 20 January 1537
4. Antoine Duprat, archbishop of Sens – cardinal-priest of S. Anastasia (received the title on 27 April 1528), † 9 July 1535
5. Enrique de Cardona y Enríquez, archbishop of Monreale – cardinal-priest of S. Marcello (received the title on 24 November 1527), † 7 February 1530
6. Girolamo Grimaldi – cardinal-deacon of S. Giorgio in Velabro (received the title on 27 April 1528), † 27 November 1543
7. Pirro Gonzaga, bishop of Modena – cardinal-deacon of S. Agata in Suburra (received the title on 27 January 1528), † 28 January 1529

Sigismondo Pappacoda, bishop of Tropea, declined the promotion to the cardinalate.

== Consistory of 7 December 1527 ==
1. Francisco de Quiñones, O.F.M., master general of the Order of Friars Minor – cardinal-priest of S. Croce in Gerusalemme (received the title on 25 September 1528), † 5 November 1540

== Consistory of 20 December 1527 ==
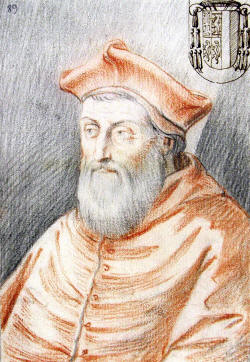
Francesco Cornaro (1478–1543), made a cardinal on December 20, 1527.

1. Francesco Cornaro – cardinal-priest of S. Pancrazio (received the title on 27 April 1528), then cardinal-priest of S. Cecilia (27 April 1534), cardinal-priest of S. Ciriaco (5 September 1534), cardinal-priest of S. Prassede (31 May 1535), cardinal-priest of S. Maria in Trastevere (23 March 1541), cardinal-bishop of Albano (14 November 1541), cardinal-bishop of Palestrina (15 February 1542), † 26 September 1543

== Promotions in January of 1529 ==
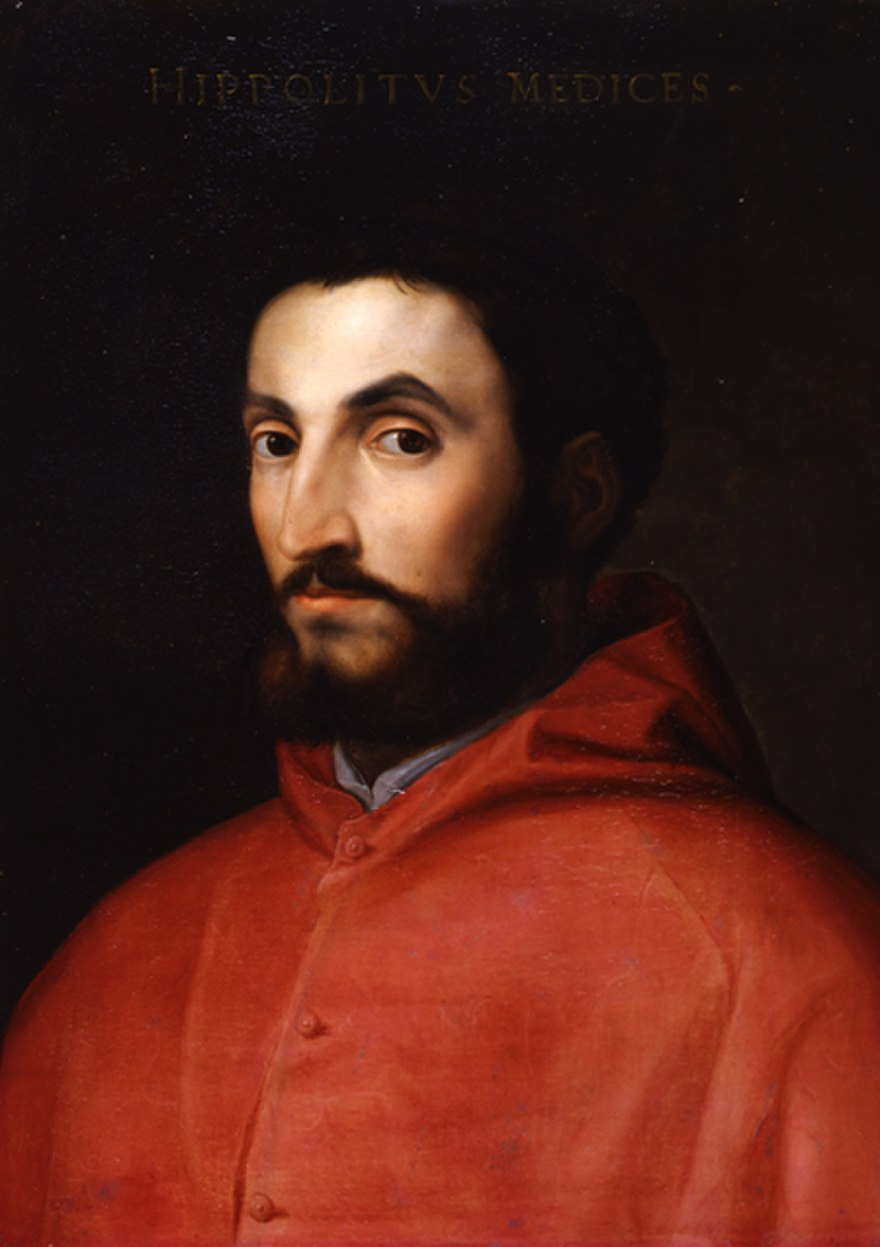
Ippolito de' Medici (1511–35), made a cardinal in January 1529.

1. Girolamo Doria – cardinal-deacon of S. Tommaso in Parione (received the title on 15 November 1529), then cardinal-deacon of S. Maria in Portico (29 May 1555), † 25 March 1558
2. Ippolito de' Medici, nephew of the Pope, archbishop of Avignon – cardinal-priest of S. Prassede (received the title on 10 January 1529), then cardinal-priest of S Lorenzo in Damaso (3 July 1532), † 10 August 1535

== Consistory of 13 August 1529 ==
1. Mercurino Gattinara, chancellor of the Emperor Charles V – cardinal-priest of S. Giovanni a Porta Latina (received the title on 3 September 1529), † 5 June 1530

== Consistory of 9 March 1530 ==
1. François de Tournon, C.R.S.A., archbishop of Bourges – cardinal-priest of SS. Marcellino e Pietro (received the title on 16 May 1530), then cardinal-bishop of Sabina (28 February 1550), cardinal-bishop of Ostia e Velletri (13 March 1560), † 22 April 1562
2. Bernardo Clesio, bishop of Trent – cardinal-priest of S Stefano in Montecelio (received the title on 16 May 1530), † 30 July 1539
3. Louis de Gorrevod, bishop of Saint-Jean de Maurienne – cardinal-priest of S. Cesareo in Palatio (received the title on 16 May 1530), † 1535
4. García de Loaysa, O.P., bishop of Osma – cardinal-priest of S. Susanna (received the title on 16 May 1530), † 22 April 1546
5. Íñigo López de Mendoza y Zúñiga, bishop of Burgos – cardinal-deacon of S. Nicola in Carcere (received the title on 21 June 1531), † 15 January 1537

== Consistory of 8 June 1530 ==
1. Gabriel de Gramont, bishop of Tarbes, ambassador of the King of France – cardinal-priest of S. Giovanni a Porta Latina (received the title on 22 June 1530) then cardinal-priest of S. Cecilia (9 January 1531), † 26 March 1534

== Consistory of 22 February 1531 ==
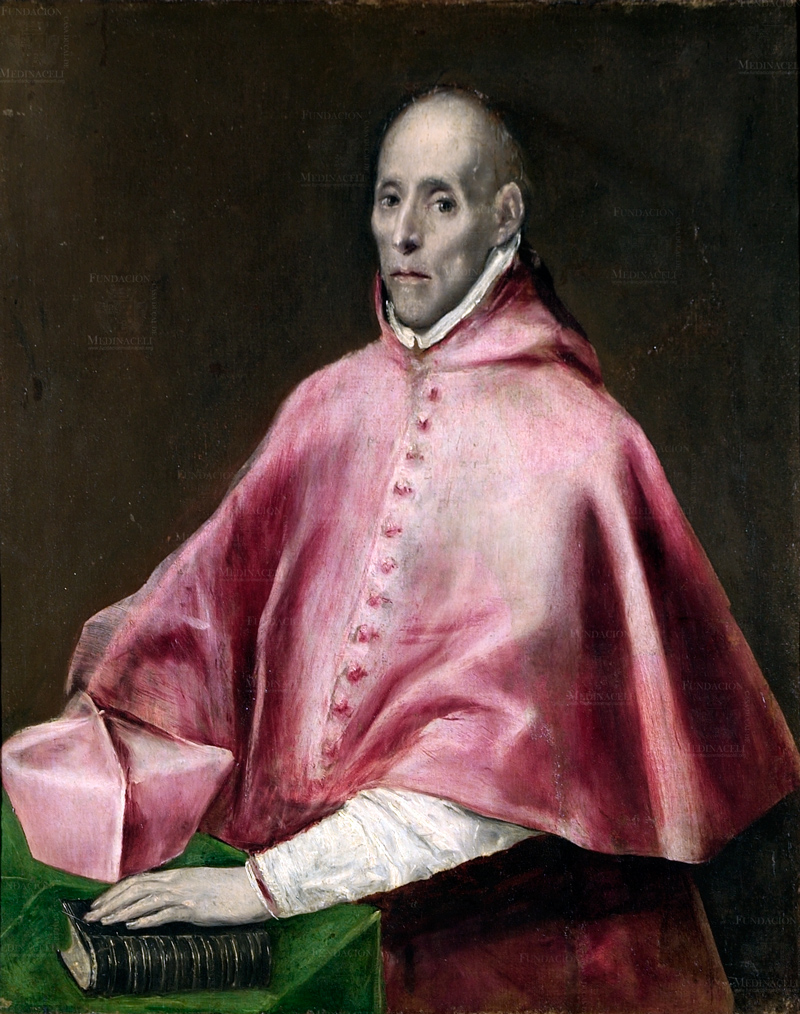
Juan Pardo de Tavera (1472–1545), made a cardinal on February 22, 1531.

1. Alonso Manrique de Lara, archbishop of Seville – cardinal-priest of S. Callisto (received the title on 17 April 1531), then cardinal-priest of SS. XII Apostoli (12 July 1532), † 28 September 1538
2. Juan Pardo de Tavera, archbishop of Santiago de Compostela – cardinal-priest of S. Giovanni a Porta Latina (received the title on 17 April 1531), † 1 August 1545

== Consistory of 22 September 1531 ==
1. Antonio Pucci, bishop of Pistoia, grand penitentiary – cardinal-priest of SS. IV Coronati (received the title on 27 September 1531), then cardinal-priest of S. Maria in Trastevere (14 November 1541), cardinal-bishop of Albano (15 February 1542), cardinal-bishop of Sabina (8 January 1543), † 12 October 1544

== Consistory of 21 February 1533 ==
1. Esteban Gabriel Merino, bishop of Jaén and patriarch of the West India – cardinal-priest of S. Vitale (received the title on 3 March 1533), then cardinal-priest of SS. Giovanni e Paolo (5 September 1534), † in July 1535

== Consistory of 3 March 1533 ==
1. Jean d’Orléans-Longueville, archbishop of Toulouse and bishop of Orleans – cardinal-priest of SS. Marcellino e Pietro, † 24 September 1533

== Consistory of 7 November 1533 ==
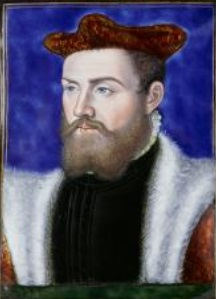
Odet de Coligny (1517–71), made a cardinal on November 7, 1533.

All the new cardinals received their titular churches on 10 November 1533:

1. Jean Le Veneur, bishop of Lisieux – cardinal-priest of S. Bartolomeo all'Isola, † 7 August 1543
2. Claude de Longwy de Givry, bishop of Langres – cardinal-priest of S. Agnese in Agone, † 9 August 1561
3. Odet de Coligny – cardinal-deacon of SS. Sergio e Bacco, then cardinal-deacon of S. Adriano (25 February 1549); deposed and excommunicated for heresy on 31 March 1563, † 13 April 1571
4. Philippe de la Chambre, O.S.B. – cardinal-priest of SS. Silvestro e Martino, then cardinal-priest of S. Prassede (23 March 1541), cardinal-priest of S. Maria in Trastevere (15 February 1542), cardinal-bishop of Frascati (24 September 1543), † 21 February 1550

== Sources ==
- Miranda, Salvador. "Consistories for the creation of Cardinals 16th Century (1503-1605): Clement VII (1523-1534)". The Cardinals of the Holy Roman Church. Florida International University. OCLC 53276621.
- Konrad Eubel, Hierarchia Catholica, Vol. III, Münster 1923
- Ludwig von Pastor, History of the Popes, vols. IX-X, London 1910
