= Ludovico da l'Armi =

Ludovico da l'Armi (fl. 1544) was an assassin hired by Henry VIII of England to kill the King's cousin and critic, Cardinal Pole. Da l'Armi was an Italian mercenary and the nephew of Cardinal Campeggio.
