= Girolamo Ghinucci =

Italian papal administrator, diplomat and Cardinal

His Eminence Girolamo Ghinucci
- Cardinal Bishop Of Worcester
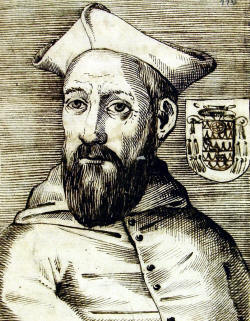
- Church: Roman Catholic
- Diocese: Worcester
- Appointed: 26 September 1522
- In office: 1522–1535
- Predecessor: Silvestro de' Gigli
- Successor: Hugh Latimer
- Other posts: Cardinal-Priest of San Clemente; Administrator of Tropea
- Previous posts: Bishop of Ascoli Piceno (1512–1518); Bishop of Malta (1523–1530); Administrator of Cavaillon (1537–1540)

Orders
- Created cardinal: 21 May 1535 by Paul III
- Rank: Cardinal Priest

Personal details
- Born: 1480 Siena, Republic of Siena
- Died: 3 July 1541 (aged 60–61)
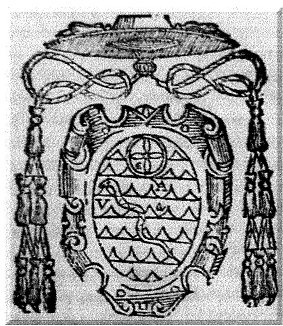
- Coat of arms: Girolamo Ghinucci's coat of arms

Girolamo Ghinucci (additionally referred to historically as: Jerome de Ghinucci, Geronimo de Ghinucci, Hieronymus Ghinucci, and Girolamo Ginucci; 1480 in Siena – 3 July 1541) was an Italian papal administrator, diplomat and cardinal in the Roman Catholic Church.

== Life ==
Ghinucci was from a Sienese banking family and became a canon of the cathedral chapter there. He then became secretary to Pope Julius II. He was bishop of Ascoli Piceno from 1512 to 1518. He was an active participant in the Fifth Lateran Council.

Pope Leo X named Ghinucci papal nuncio to England, where Henry VIII retained him for a period as advisor. Ghinucci advised on Henry's moves to divorce Catherine of Aragon. Ghinucci's nephew, Augustine de Augustinis, served as personal physician to Cardinal Wolsey. Augustinis also performed some diplomatic and espionage services for the Cardinal. He later became physician-in-ordinary to Henry VIII.

In 1522, he succeeded Giulio de' Medici, the Cardinal protector of England as Bishop of Worcester (the last of the Italian absentees to hold the see). In September 1525, Bishop Ghinucci was appointed one of Henry's ambassadors in residence in Rome. In November 1526, he was sent on an embassy from Henry to the Holy Roman Emperor in Spain. In October 1529, he was re-accredited to Rome.

He held the bishopric until 1535 when he was deprived of the position by King Henry VIII; also deprived was the Bishop of Salisbury, Lorenzo Campeggio. In the same year, Ghinucci was made a Cardinal by Pope Paul III, and served on commissions to reform the Church.

He also served as Bishop Administrator of the Diocese of Malta from 1523 to 1538. He was Camerlengo of the Sacred College of Cardinals from January 7, 1538, to January 10, 1539.

He was involved, with Silvester Prierias, in the papal reaction to Martin Luther after 1518.

He maintained English contacts through Richard Croke.

Ghinucci died in Rome July 3, 1541, Rome and was buried in the basilica of San Clemente, where he was Cardinal protector from 25 January 1537 until his death. A prominent Latin inscription commemorating him is to be seen in the north aisle of the basilica (to the right of the entrance to the sacristy and excavations).

== Notes ==
Catholic Church titles
Preceded by Silvestro de' Gigli	Bishop of Worcester; 1522–1535	Succeeded by Hugh Latimer; As CofE bishop (unrecognized by Vatican)
Preceded by Silvestro de' Gigli	Bishop of Worcester; 1522–1535	Succeeded by Himself; As RC bishop (unrecognized by Crown)
Preceded by Himself (recognized by both Crown and Vatican)	Bishop of Worcester (unrecognized by Crown); 1535–1541	Succeeded by Richard Pate
