= Cardinal protector of England =

Catholic title for a particular Cardinal representative of England

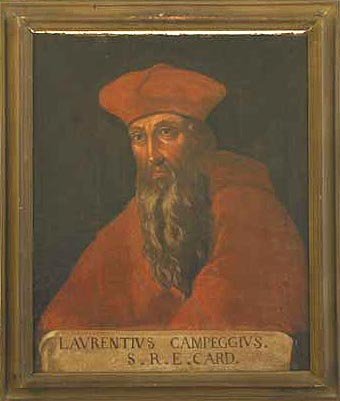
Lorenzo Campeggio, the last cardinal protector of England confirmed by the crown

The Cardinal protector of England was an appointed crown-cardinal of England from 1492 until 1539. A cardinal protector is the representative of a Catholic nation or organisation within the College of Cardinals, appointed by the Pope. The role was terminated as a result of the English Reformation.

The role of national protectorships within the College developed during the fifteenth century, due to developments in the emergence of national monarchies and Renaissance diplomacy. Cardinal protectors of Catholic religious orders date back farther to the thirteenth century. According to King Henry VIII, the cardinal protector "indueth as it were our owne Person, for the defence of Us and our Realme in al matiers [in the Curia]...touching the same". The cardinal protector represented the monarch in consistory, especially in cases where the right of investiture was divided between the Pope and the monarch, and also led the English diplomatic corps in Rome.

Although earlier cardinals had filled similar roles, "the existence of national protectorships was first openly and regularly recognized only" by Pope Julius II. The terms 'cardinal protector' and 'cardinal procurator' were "used very loosely and sometimes interchangeably during the fifteenth century". The earliest reference to a 'cardinal protector' of England dates from 1492, but according to Wilkie, this results from a confusion between this office and that of cardinal procurator.

Unlike other national cardinal protectors, the cardinal protectors of England, Scotland, and Ireland were generally chosen exclusively by the Pope. The cardinal was "imposed from above, rather than chosen" and often had no direct relationship with the governments of these countries. The English cardinal protector played a large role in English ecclesiastical appointments, and a substantial role in similar appointments in Scotland and Ireland.

== History ==
=== Piccolomini (1492–1503) ===
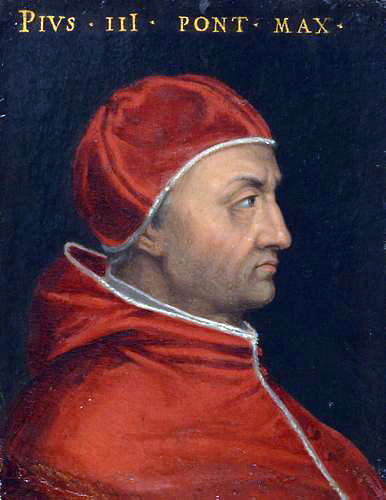
Pope Pius III

Francesco Piccolomini, the future Pope Pius III, was the first cardinal protector of England, elevated on the initiative of King Henry VII, and also the first officially approved cardinal protector of "any nation whatever". Henry VII viewed good relations with Rome as a protection against domestic and foreign enemies and sent Christopher Urswick, his "almoner and trusted councillor" to Rome after receiving a bull of dispensation to marry Elizabeth of York. When Henry VII first sought a cardinal protector in 1492, he feared that many of the English bishops would support his Yorkist opponents (to whom they owed their appointments).

A variety of other disagreements existed, such as the papal income tax and the refusal of the Pope to create John Morton, the archbishop of Canterbury, a cardinal; Innocent VII had passed over Morton in his first consistory, despite creating two French cardinals. Nor had John Sherwood, the English ambassador in Rome, been created a cardinal in 1484, despite the request of King Richard III. Piccolomini's creation as cardinal protector was requested by Henry VII in a letter congratulating the newly elected Pope Alexander VI, and was confirmed in a response which was probably written by Giovanni Gigli.

Piccolomini was already the protector of the Camaldese Benedictines and was close to German princes, although he was not the German protector in any official sense, and his protectorship of England is "the first official one of any cardinal which can be firmly established". Henry VII did not object to Piccolomini's German connections, even viewing them as an asset against the French.

=== Castellesi (1503–1504) ===
The appointment of Adriano Castellesi as cardinal on 31 May 1503 "eclipsed England's cardinal protector", with appointments to the English sees thereafter being referred through Castellesi instead of through Piccolomini. Piccolomini was himself elected as Pope Pius III on 22 September 1503, only to die less than a month later, on 18 October; Castellesi did not vote for him and Piccolomini was chosen for his perceived neutrality rather than for his English connections. According to the account of Castellesi, Pius III acknowledged him as his de facto successor as protector.

Castellesi was a favourite of Pope Alexander VI, which became a liability during the reign of Pope Julius II. During Julius II's reign, Castellesi, "although neither requesting nor mentioning the office of protector of England, certainly presented himself to Henry VII as the cardinal responsible for English affairs in the Curia". In an attempt to secure his status against the intrigues of Silvestro Gigli, Castellesi donated his residence, the Palazzo Giraud Torlonia on the present Via della Conciliazione, to Henry VII. In 1504, Henry VII named six official members of his embassy, headed by Castellesi, and also including Sir Gilbert Talbot, Richard Beere, Robert Sherborne, Silvestro Gigli, and Edward Scott.

Paris de Grassis, the master of papal ceremonies, referred to Castellesi as "Regis Protector" in his notes of a meeting between the embassy and the Pope.

=== della Rovere (1504–1508) ===
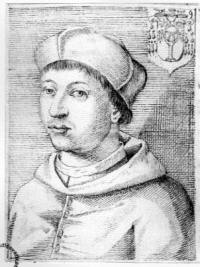
Galeotto della Rovere

A letter from Julius II to Henry VII dated 6 July 1504, remarks that the king had chosen the Pope's cardinal-nephew Galeotto della Rovere as cardinal protector; the letter does not mention Castellesi. della Rovere's selection was likely arranged by Gigli. Castellesi was compensated by being promoted to the wealthier See of Bath and Wells. Castellesi lost favour with the king and fled Rome until the death of Julius II.

Rovere died on 11 September 1508, leaving England without a cardinal protector. Sherbone and Hugh Inge were back in England; Scott was dead; Gigli was in England as nuncio. The "only man on whose loyalty the king could truly rely" was Christopher Fisher, who was a "single, bumbling amateur" compared to the more seasoned curial diplomats who surrounded him. Henry VII himself died on 21 April 1509.

Another cardinal-nephew, Sisto della Rovere, who received the vice-chancellorship and all the benefices of his half-brother, was not explicitly named as protector, although he wrote to Henry VII stating his intent to "maintain his brother's friendships". Henry VIII replied to Sisto that he considered his friendship especially valuable, asserting that Sisto had been close to his father. There is no evidence that Sisto was offered the protectorship.

=== Aldiosi (1509–1510) ===
Francesco Adiosi

Cardinal Francesco Adiosi may have become cardinal protector, but this appointment "cannot be exactly established" as his only surviving letters to England do not mention the protectorate. Adiosi is explicitly mentioned as protector in a 1509 letter from Christopher Bainbridge (the first English curial cardinal since the death of Adam Easton in 1397), by which point Adiosi and go-between Girolamo Bonvisio were on the "brink of disgrace".

Bonvisio disclosed the contents of his discussions with the king to a French agent and confessed his being employed by Aldiosi under threat of torture; by this point Adiosi was no longer protector. According to a 6 April 1510 letter from the Venetian ambassador, the king dismissed Adiosi as protector and gave the post to Sisto della Rovere. There is no direct evidence that Sisto ever received the official title before he died in March 1517. Until the death of Julius II, Bainbridge "filled the vacuum, real or in effect, in the protectorship of England".

Castellesi returned to Rome on the death of Julius II on 21 February 1513 for the papal conclave, 1513; although Castellesi "tactually" voted for Bainbridge on the second ballot, the two inevitably came into conflict as "rival representatives of England". The lack of consistorial records, which would list which cardinals referred the nominations of which bishops, are missing for this period, making it impossible to assess the extent of Bainbridge's role.

=== Medici (1514–1523) ===
In 1514, Gigli (as the agent of Wolsey and Henry VIII) arranged for another cardinal-nephew Giulio de'Medici (future Pope Clement VII) to be cardinal protector of England. Medici's letter of appointment makes no reference to Sisto della Rovere. An 8 February 1514 letter from Pope Leo X to Henry VIII of England flatters the king for having elevated the pope's cardinal-nephew and cousin as protector. The pope's brother Giuliano de' Medici was also made a Knight of the Garter (just as Guidobaldo II della Rovere had been made when della Rovere had been made protector).

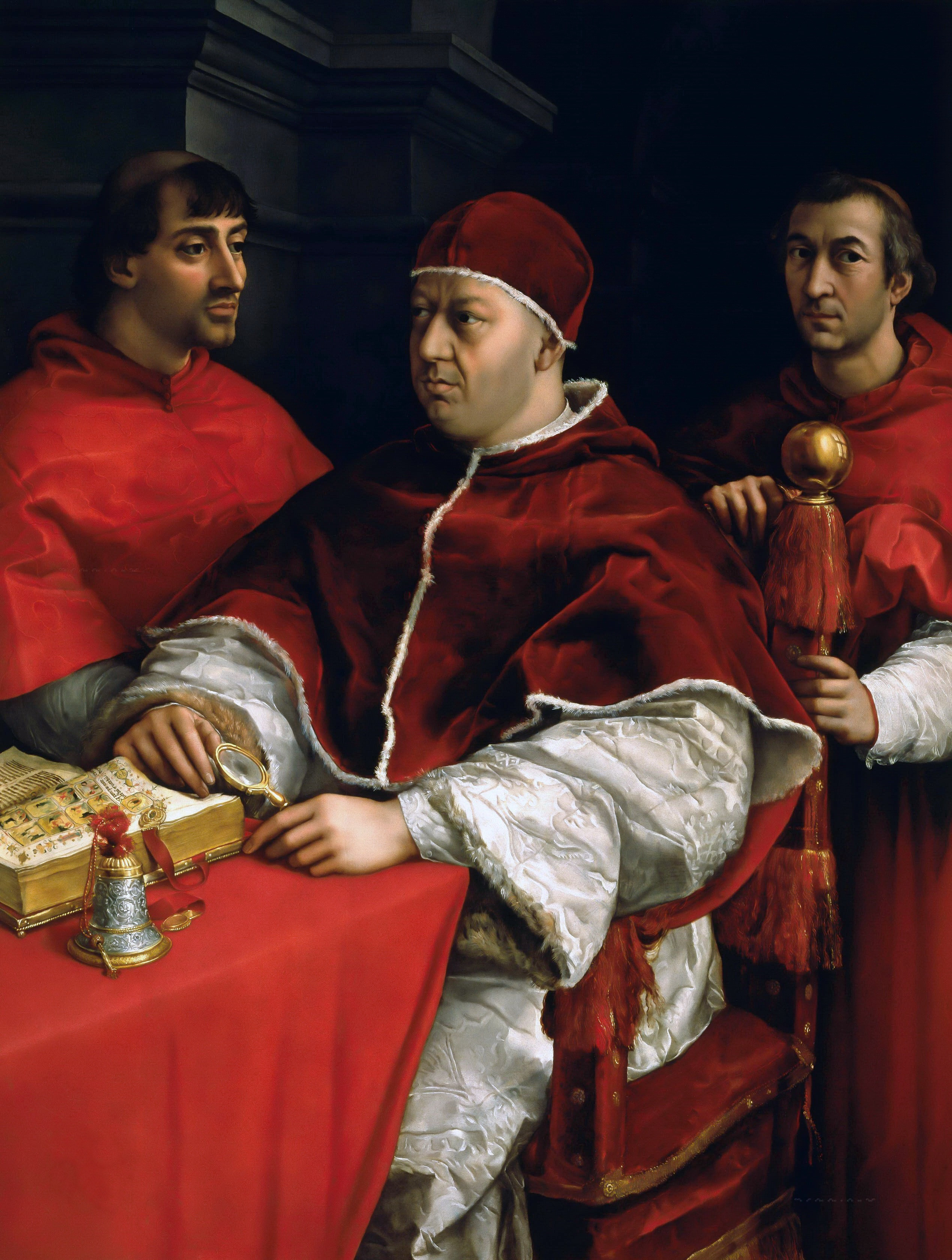
Pope Leo X (center) with his cardinal-nephew Giulio de'Medici (left, future Pope Clement VII)

Bainbridge was "short-circuited" by the appointment of Medici, although he continued to play a role until his death on 14 July 1514. Gigli was accused of having played a role in the death of Bainbridge and Medici was charged with examining the facts, concluding that Gigli was innocent. The period between Piccolomini and Medici (from 1503 to 1514) is one where the role of the protector was not well-defined. The importance of the office increased significantly with the appointment of Medici in 1514, due in no small part to the friendship between Medici and Wolsey. According to Wilkie, "its importance stemmed from the special relationship of the papacy with England as the most reliable supporter of papal independence".

Medici accepted the protectorship of France as well in 1516, meeting Francis I of France personally in Bologna, much to the "discomfiture of England". Medici was elected Clement VII on 19 November 1523.

=== Campeggio (1524–1539) ===
Lorenzo Campeggio was close to Medici and served as cardinal protector to Germany at the time of Medici's election. Campeggio received a variety of appointments from Clement VII before Henry VIII chose him as protector on 22 February 1524 (conditional on the pope's acceptance of Wolsey as legate for life).

Campeggio found his loyalty divided when he was appointed with Wolsey to judge the issue of the requested annulment of Henry VIII of England from Catherine of Aragon, the aunt of Charles V, Holy Roman Emperor. Campeggio came out in favour of the legitimacy of the marriage, after considerable delay in travelling and reviewing the canonical evidence. The final sentence in the case was handed down in Rome in 1534, the same year the English Parliament passed the First Act of Supremacy. Henry VIII was particularly displeased by Campeggio's "constant company with the emperor" in the years prior to his verdict and Campeggio's rapidly growing income, having been granted the bishopric of Huesca and Jaca in 1530, and the bishopric of Mallorca in 1532, both by Charles V.

In January 1531, Campeggio was dismissed as cardinal protector, although it did not become public knowledge until May. At first it was unclear whether Henry VIII intended to appoint a successor, with Giovanni Domenico de Cupis emerging as an active candidate in March 1532. The king favoured Alessandro Farnese (future Pope Paul III), and instructed his ambassadors on 21 March to offer it to Farnese, and then de Cupis or Giovanni del Monte (future Pope Julius III) in the event that Farnese declined or was not approved.

Not knowing that Henry VIII had already secretly married the pregnant Anne Boleyn, Clement VII decided to reach out to the monarch by appointing Thomas Cranmer, an outspoken proponent of Henry VIII's annulment, as archbishop of Canterbury. A threatened excommunication was handed down when Cranmer pronounced Henry VIII's marriage null and void; Henry VIII responded by telling Campeggio's vicar general for Salisbury to stop all revenues from his bishopric until further notice. Henry VIII then claimed the authority to act on behalf of Campeggio in making various ecclesiastical appointments. The fifth session of the Reformation Parliament deprived Campeggio and Girolamo Ghinucci of their English sees (unless they swore loyalty to the king). Unaware of this statute, two days later on 23 March 1534 Campeggio entered Consistory for the final ruling against annulment.

According to Wilkie, "years of cooperation from both popes and cardinal protectors had taught a wilful Henry VIII to expect to have his way over the church of England". Clement VII died on 25 September before learning of the denial of papal authority on 31 March by the Convocation of Canterbury. In the 1534 papal conclave, Campeggio was the only cardinal to oppose Farnese's proposal for non-secret voting and the only cardinal not to kiss the feet of the newly elected Farnese as Paul III.

== Attempts at reconciliation ==
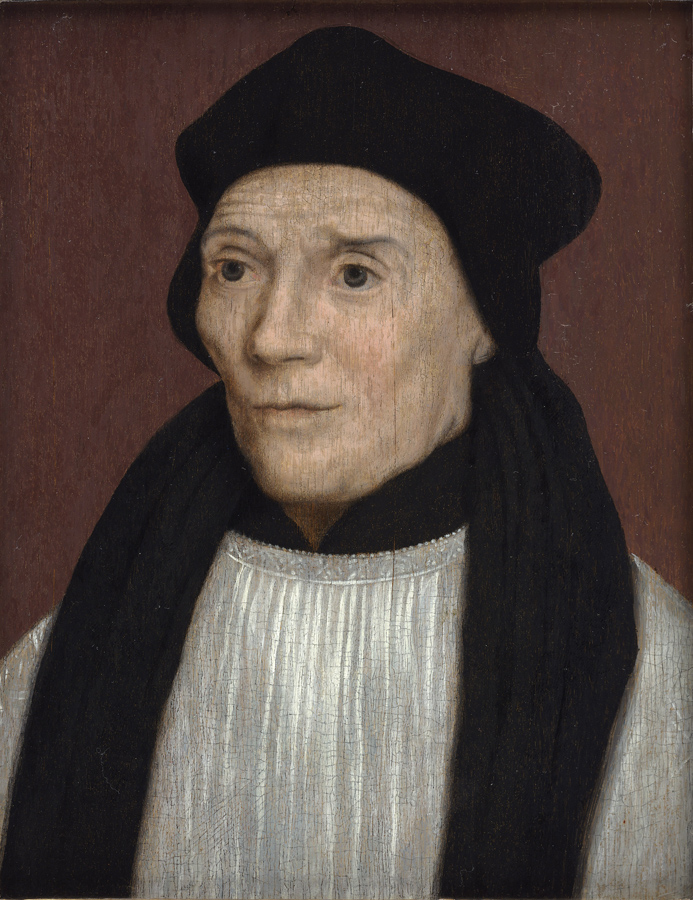
John Fisher, the only cardinal recognised by the church as a martyr

Many in Rome still thought reconciliation with England was possible, and Paul III elevated two English cardinals, John Fisher (at the time imprisoned and sentenced to death by Henry VIII) and Girolamo Ghinucci. The execution of Fisher prompted Paul III to excommunicate and purportedly depose Henry VIII. While Campeggio lived, no attempt was made in Rome to fill any of the thirteen episcopal vacancies in England.

Queen Mary I of England briefly reconciled with Rome and appointed Reginald Pole as archbishop of Canterbury. However, "papal restoration in England was doomed even before it was accomplished" when Mary I married Philip II of Spain. In 1555, Pope Paul IV named a new cardinal protector, Giovanni Morone, but the queen did not confirm the nomination and Campeggio remained the last cardinal protector "chosen by the crown".

Meanwhile, loyalty to the pope became a defining feature of the movement for Irish nationalism and bishops appointed by the Pope garnered a larger following than the hierarchy of the church of Ireland appointed by the crown. According to Wilkie, "the cardinal protectors had assisted in the loss of England to the papacy, and Ireland remained loyal to the papacy in spite of them".

== List of Cardinal protectors ==
- Francesco Piccolomini (future Pope Pius III), first cardinal protector of England (ante 8 February 1492 – 1503), de facto protector of Germany
- Adriano Castellesi, de facto protector of England and official protector of Germany
- Galeotto Franciotti della Rovere (1505–11 September 1508)
- Francesco Adiosi (1508–1510)
- Giulio de'Medici (1514–1523) (future Pope Clement VII)
- Lorenzo Campeggio (1523–1534, died 1539)

Not confirmed by the crown

- Giovanni Morone, (1578–1579)
- Philip Howard (1682–1694)
- Filippo Antonio Gualterio (circa 1717)
- Cardinal Baschi (circa 4 November 1797)
- Ercole Consalvi (circa 1817, acting)

Similar prior offices

- Thomas of Jorz, proctor for Kings Edward I and Edward II of England (1305–1310)
- Ferry de Clugny, employed in Rome by Edward IV of England (d. 1483)
