= Silvestro de' Gigli =

15th and 16th-century Bishop of Worcester

- Bishop of Worcester
- Appointed: 24 December 1498
- Term ended: 16 April 1521
- Predecessor: Giovanni de' Gigli
- Successor: Geronimo De Ghinucci

Orders
- Consecration: c. 6 April 1499

Personal details
- Died: 16 April 1521
- Denomination: Catholic

Silvestro de' Gigli, of Lucca, was a Late Middle Ages and High Renaissance Bishop of Worcester, the second of four Italian absentees to hold the see before the Reformation.

He succeeded his uncle, Giovanni de' Gigli, was nominated on 24 December 1498 and consecrated about 6 April 1499. He was implicated but never charged in the 1514 murder by poison of Cardinal and Archbishop of York Christopher Bainbridge. He died on 16 April 1521. The position was then held by Giulio de' Medici, the Cardinal protector of England.

== Citations ==
Catholic Church titles
Preceded by Giovanni de' Gigli	Bishop of Worcester; 1498–1521	Succeeded by Geronimo De Ghinucci
