= Antonio Sanseverino =

Italian cardinal

His Eminence Antonio Sanseverino
- Cardinal, Archbishop of Taranto
- Church: Catholic Church
- In office: 1528–1543
- Other post: Cardinal-Bishop of Porto e Santa Rufina (1543–43)

Orders
- Ordination: 17 November 1528 by Alessandro Farnèse
- Consecration: 21 December 1531 by Pope Clement VII
- Created cardinal: 21 November 1527 by Pope Clement VII
- Rank: Cardinal-Bishop

Personal details
- Born: c. 1477 Naples, Kingdom of Naples
- Died: 17 August 1543 (aged c. 66) Rome, Papal States

Antonio Sanseverino (died 1543) was an Italian Roman Catholic cardinal and bishop.

== Biography ==
Antonio Sanseverino was born in Naples ca. 1477, the son of Giovanni Antonio Sanseverino, a Neapolitan patrician, and Enrichetta Carafa.

Early in his career, he joined the Knights Hospitaller. Pope Leo X made him a cardinal while he was still a layman. However the promotion was contingent on certain conditions that Sanseverino never complied with, so his elevation to the cardinalate was never published and neither Pope Leo X nor Pope Adrian VI ever recognized him as a cardinal.

Pope Clement VII made him a cardinal priest in the consistory of 21 November 1527. He received the red hat and the titular church of Santa Susanna from Cardinal Lorenzo Campeggio in the Castel Sant'Angelo on 27 April 1528. He received the tonsure from Cardinal Alessandro Farnese.

On 31 August 1528 he was elected Archbishop of Taranto. He occupied that see until his death. He was the administrator of the see of Conversano from 28 July 1529 to 11 February 1534. He was the Camerlengo of the Sacred College of Cardinals from 24 January 1530 to 18 January 1531. He opted for the titular church of Sant'Apollinare alle Terme Neroniane-Alessandrine on 16 May 1530. He was consecrated as a bishop by Pope Clement VII in the Sistine Chapel on 21 December 1531. On 5 September 1534 he opted for the titular church of Santa Maria in Trastevere.

He participated in the papal conclave of 1534 that elected Pope Paul III.

He was the cardinal protector of the Order of Friars Minor Capuchin, in which capacity he resisted proposals to merge the order with the Friars Minor Observants.

On 28 November 1537 he opted for the order of cardinal bishops and received the suburbicarian see of Palestrina. He was the papal legate (along with Cardinals Lorenzo Campeggio, Giacomo Simoneta, and Girolamo Aleandro) to the general council held at Mantua then at Vicenza.

On 4 August 1539 he opted for the suburbicarian see of Sabina; then, on 8 January 1543, for the suburbicarian see of Porto e Santa Rufina. He was Vice-Dean of the College of Cardinals.

He died in Rome on night of 17-18 August 1543. He is buried in Trinità dei Monti.
