= Richard Croke =

English classical scholar (c. 1489–1558)

Richard Croke (or Crocus) (c. 1489–1558) was an English classical scholar and a royal tutor and agent.

== Early life and education ==
He was educated at Eton College. He took his BA at King's College, Cambridge in 1510 and proceeded to travel. (Note: has him at Basel (listed in French as "Richard Crocus").) He studied Greek with William Grocyn in London and Oxford and then with Erasmus and Aleander in Paris in 1511. In 1514, he was called to the University of Leipzig, where he remained for some years. Among his pupils were Joachim Camerarius, Hieronymus Dungersheim, who had studied with Croke in Dresden, and Caspar Creuziger. He was replaced by Petrus Mosellanus. (Note: Croke the Grecian and Mosellanus the Latinist were in Leipzig in contact also with Georg Agricola) As a young man, he was identified as a follower of Erasmus, who was then constructing his editio princeps of the New Testament in Greek (Basel, 1516).

== Career ==
He was recalled by John Fisher in 1519 (Note: CNDB says 1517, when he took his M. A. from Cambridge. Dresden und Sachsen - Dresden und Sachsen - Geschichte - Bildung, Wissenschaft agrees. Hilgendorf says 1518.) to teach Greek at Cambridge. It had been in abeyance since Erasmus's time (1511–1513), and he was Cambridge's second lecturer in Greek. He became Public Orator at Cambridge in 1522, Fellow of St John's College, Cambridge in 1523, and Doctor of Divinity in 1524. He quarrelled with Fisher over college matters in the later 1520s.

In 1529 and 1530, he acted for Henry VIII in Italy in the matter of the king's intended divorce from Catherine of Aragon; he had earlier tutored Henry in Greek. Croke later tutored the illegitimate Duke of Richmond and Somerset, his son. While seeking canon lawyers to support Henry's side of the argument, (Note: Bribes were involved but not successful: "Original Letter of Dr Richard Croke to K Henry VIII written at Venice, A.D. 1529. or 1530. the 23 of Octobre, concerning the prevarication of certain Friers of the University of Padua, who had taken his Majesties money, for their Subscription, as disallowing his marriage with Q. Catherine; and yet now are altogether for it.") he also contacted humanists (such as Girolamo Ghinucci) and sought manuscripts.

On his return to England, he in 1531 became deputy vice-chancellor of Cambridge and vicar of Long Buckby, Nottinghamshire. A year later he moved to the University of Oxford.

He was a witness at the 1555 trial of Thomas Cranmer.

== Works ==
- Ausonius (1515)
- Orationes Richardi Croci duos (1520)

== Sources ==
- J. Przychocki, "Richard Croke's search for patristic mss in connexion with the divorce of Catherine", Theol. Studies. 1911; os-XIII: 285–295
- J. T. Sheppard (1919), Richard Croke, a sixteenth century don: being the Croke Lecture for the May Term, 1919
- Jonathan M. Woolfson (2000), "A 'remote and ineffectual Don'? Richard Croke in the Biblioteca Marciana". Bulletin of the Society for Renaissance Studies, 17:2, 1–11
