= Pope Clement VII =

Head of the Catholic Church from 1523 to 1534

- Bishop of Rome
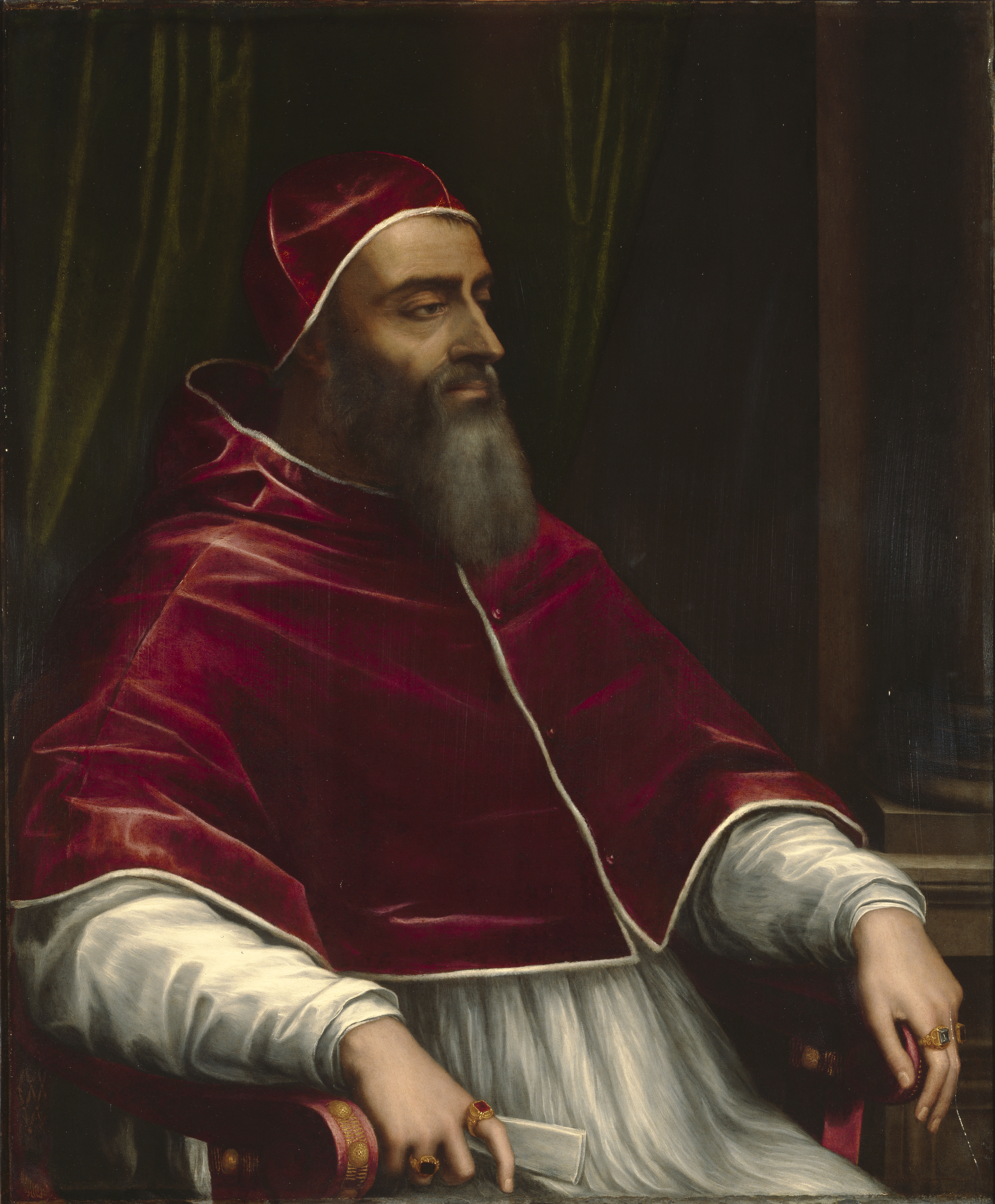
- Portrait by Sebastiano del Piombo, c. 1531
- Church: Catholic Church
- Papacy began: 19 November 1523
- Papacy ended: 25 September 1534
- Predecessor: Adrian VI
- Successor: Paul III
- Previous posts: Archbishop of Florence (1513–1523); Cardinal-Deacon of Santa Maria in Domnica (1513–1517); Cardinal-Priest of San Clemente (1517); Cardinal-Priest of San Lorenzo in Damaso (1517–1523); Titular Bishop of Worcester (1521-1523)

Orders
- Ordination: 19 December 1517
- Consecration: 21 December 1517 by Leo X
- Created cardinal: 23 September 1513 by Leo X

Personal details
- Born: Giulio di Giuliano de' Medici; 26 May 1478 Florence
- Died: 25 September 1534 (aged 56) Rome, Papal States
- Buried: Basilica of Santa Maria sopra Minerva
- Parents: Giuliano de' Medici; Fioretta Gorini
- Motto: Candor illaesus (Innocence inviolate)
- Signature: Clement VII's signature

- Coat of arms: Clement VII's coat of arms

Papal styles of Pope Clement VII
- Reference style: His Holiness
- Spoken style: Your Holiness
- Religious style: Holy Father
- Posthumous style: None

Pope Clement VII (Latin: Clemens VII; Italian: Clemente VII; born Giulio di Giuliano de' Medici; 26 May 1478 – 25 September 1534) was head of the Catholic Church and ruler of the Papal States from 19 November 1523 to his death on 25 September 1534. Deemed "the most unfortunate of the popes", Clement VII's reign was marked by a rapid succession of political, military, and religious struggles—many long in the making—which had far-reaching consequences for Christianity and world politics.

Elected in 1523 at the end of the Italian Renaissance, Clement came to the papacy with a high reputation as a statesman. He had served with distinction as chief advisor to Pope Leo X (1513–1521, his cousin), Pope Adrian VI (1522–1523), and commendably as gran maestro of Florence (1519–1523). Assuming leadership at a time of crisis, with the Protestant Reformation spreading, the Church nearing bankruptcy, and large foreign armies invading Italy, Clement initially tried to unite Christendom by making peace among the many Christian leaders then at odds. He later attempted to liberate Italy from foreign occupation, believing that it threatened the Church's freedom.

The complex political situation of the 1520s repeatedly thwarted Clement's efforts. He inherited unprecedented challenges, including Martin Luther's Protestant Reformation in Northern Europe; a vast power struggle in Italy between Europe's two most powerful monarchs, Charles V of the Holy Roman Empire and Francis I of France, each of whom demanded that the Pope choose a side; and Turkish invasions of Eastern Europe led by Suleiman the Magnificent. Clement's problems were exacerbated by souring relations with Charles V in 1527, which led to the violent Sack of Rome, during which Clement was imprisoned. After escaping confinement in the Castel Sant'Angelo, Clement—with few economic, military, or political options remaining—compromised the Church's and the Papal States' independence by allying with his former enemy, Charles V. His difficulties continued during Henry VIII of England's contentious effort to annul his marriage, resulting in England breaking away from the Catholic Church.

In contrast to his tortured pontificate, Clement was personally respectable and devout, possessing a "dignified propriety of character", "great acquirements both theological and scientific", as well as "extraordinary address and penetration—Clement VII, in serener times, might have administered the Papal power with high reputation and enviable prosperity. But with all of his profound insight into the political affairs of Europe, Clement does not seem to have comprehended the altered position of the Pope" in relation to Europe's emerging nation-states and Protestantism.

Clement left a significant cultural legacy in the Medici tradition. He commissioned artworks by Raphael, Benvenuto Cellini, and Michelangelo, including Michelangelo's The Last Judgment in the Sistine Chapel. In matters of science, Clement is best known for approving, in 1533, Nicolaus Copernicus's theory that the Earth revolves around the Sun—99 years before Galileo Galilei's heresy trial.

== Early life ==
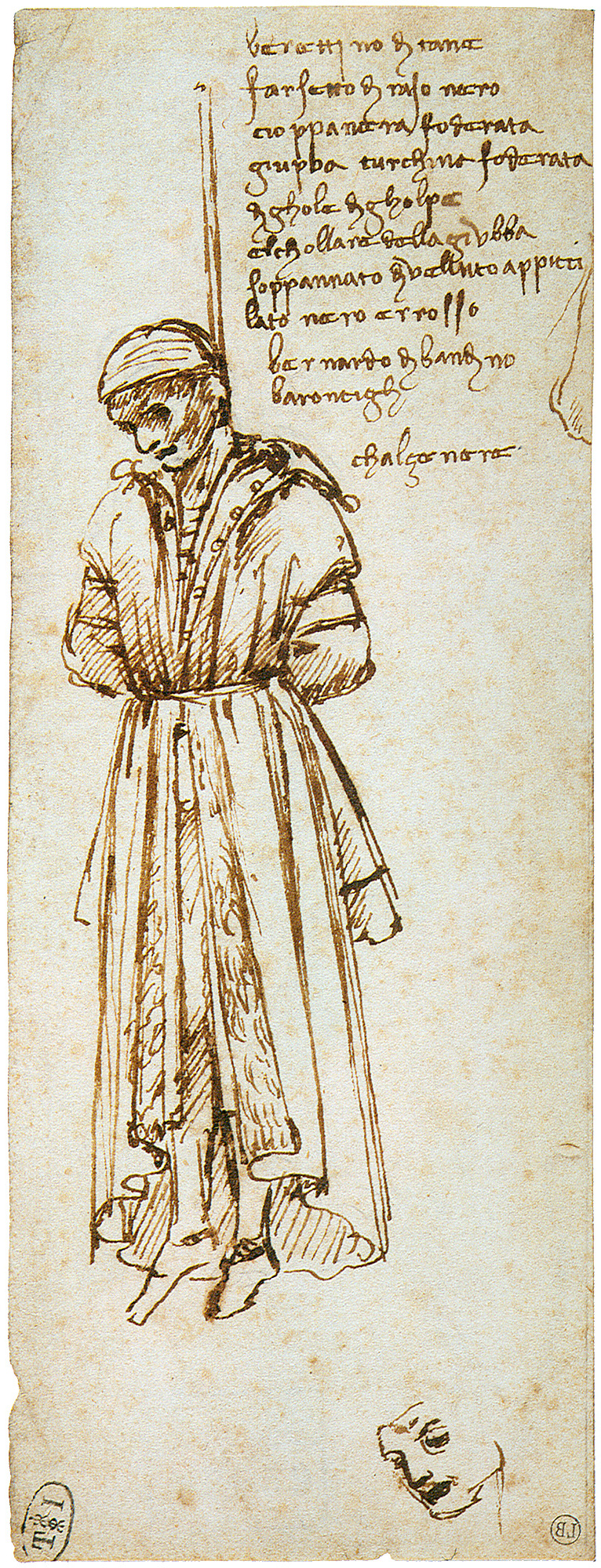
Hanging of Bernardo Baroncelli, Leonardo da Vinci, 1479. Pazzi Conspirator.

Giulio de' Medici's life began under tragic circumstances. On 26 April 1478—exactly one month before his birth—his father, Giuliano de Medici (brother of Lorenzo the Magnificent) was murdered in the Florence Cathedral by enemies of his family, in what is now known as the "Pazzi conspiracy". He was born illegitimately on 26 May 1478, in Florence; the exact identity of his mother remains unknown, although a plurality of scholars contend that it was Fioretta Gorini, the daughter of a professor, Antonio Gorini. Giulio spent the first seven years of life with his godfather, the architect Antonio da Sangallo the Elder.

Thereafter, Lorenzo the Magnificent raised him as one of his own sons, alongside his children Giovanni (the future Pope Leo X), Piero, and Giuliano. Educated at the Palazzo Medici in Florence by humanists like Angelo Poliziano, and alongside prodigies like Michelangelo, Giulio became an accomplished musician. In personality he was reputed to be shy, and in physical appearance, handsome.

Giulio's natural inclination was for the clergy, but his illegitimacy barred him from high-ranking positions in the Church. So Lorenzo the Magnificent helped him carve out a career as a soldier. He was enrolled in the Knights of Rhodes, but also became Grand Prior of Capua. In 1492, when Lorenzo the Magnificent died and Giovanni de' Medici assumed his duties as a cardinal, Giulio became more involved in Church affairs. He studied canon law at the University of Pisa, and accompanied Giovanni to the conclave of 1492, where Rodrigo Borgia was elected Pope Alexander VI.

Following the misfortunes of Lorenzo the Magnificent's firstborn son, Piero the Unfortunate, the Medici were expelled from Florence in 1494. Over the next six years, Cardinal Giovanni and Giulio wandered throughout Europe together—twice getting arrested (first in Ulm, and later in Rouen). Each time Piero the Unfortunate bailed them out. In 1500, both returned to Italy and concentrated their efforts on re-establishing their family in Florence. Both were present at the Battle of Ravenna in 1512, where Cardinal Giovanni was captured by the French but Giulio escaped; this led to Giulio becoming an emissary to Pope Julius II. That same year, with the assistance of Pope Julius and the Spanish troops of Ferdinand II of Aragon, the Medici retook control of Florence.

=== Paternity of Alessandro de' Medici ===
In 1510, while the Medici were living near Rome, a servant in their household—identified in documents as Simonetta da Collevecchio—became pregnant, ultimately giving birth to a son, Alessandro de' Medici. Nicknamed "il Moro" ("the Moor") due to his dark complexion, Alessandro was officially recognized as the illegitimate son of Lorenzo II de Medici, but at the time and to this day, various scholars suggest that Alessandro was the illegitimate son of Giulio de' Medici. The truth of his lineage remains unknown and debated.

Regardless of his paternity, throughout Alessandro's brief life, Giulio—as Pope Clement VII—showed him great favoritism, elevating Alessandro over Ippolito de Medici as Florence's first hereditary monarch, despite the latter's comparable qualifications.

== Cardinal ==
=== Under Pope Leo X ===
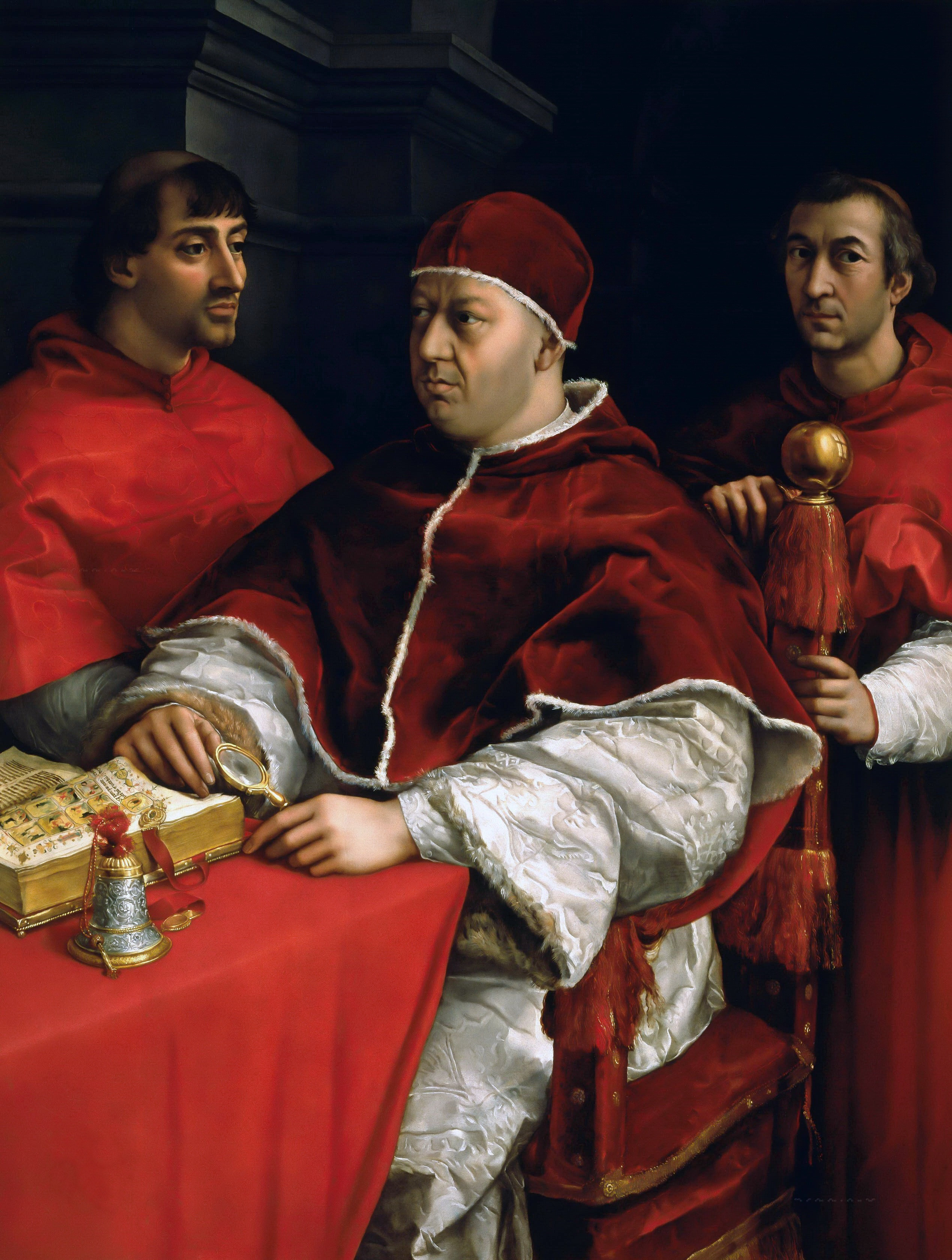
Giulio Cardinal de' Medici, left; with his cousin Pope Leo X, center; and Luigi Cardinal de' Rossi, right; by Raphael, 1519

Giulio de' Medici appeared on the world stage in March 1513, at the age of 35, when his cousin Giovanni de' Medici was elected Pope, taking the name Leo X. Pope Leo X reigned until his death on 1 December 1521.

"Learned, clever, respectable, and industrious", Giulio de' Medici's reputation and responsibilities grew at a rapid pace, unusual even for the Renaissance. Within three months of Leo X's election, he was named Archbishop of Florence. Later that autumn, all barriers to his attaining the Church's highest offices were removed by a Papal dispensation that resulted in his birth being recognized as legitimate. It stated that his parents had been betrothed per sponsalia de presenti. This Papal act permitted Leo X to create him cardinal during the first Papal consistory on 23 September 1513. On 29 September, he was appointed Cardinal Deacon of Santa Maria in Domnica—a position that had been vacated by the Pope.

Cardinal Giulio's reputation during the reign of Leo X is recorded by contemporary Marco Minio, the Venetian ambassador to the Papal Court, who wrote in a letter to the Venetian Senate in 1519: "Cardinal de' Medici, the Pope's cardinal nephew, who is not legitimate, has great power with the Pope; he is a man of great competence and great authority; he resides with the Pope, and does nothing of importance without first consulting him. But he is returning to Florence to govern the city."

==== Statesmanship ====
While Cardinal Giulio was not officially appointed Vice-Chancellor of the Church (second-in-command) until 9 March 1517, in practice Leo X governed in partnership with his cousin from the beginning. Initially, his duties centered primarily on administering Church affairs in Florence and conducting international relations. In January 1514, Henry VIII of England appointed him Cardinal protector of England. The following year, Francis I of France nominated him to become Archbishop of Narbonne, and in 1516 named him cardinal protector of France. In a scenario typical of Cardinal Giulio's independent-minded statesmanship, the respective kings of England and France, recognizing a conflict of interest in Giulio protecting both countries simultaneously, brought pressure to bear on him to resign his other protectorship; to their dismay, he refused.

Cardinal Giulio's foreign policy was shaped by the idea of la libertà d'Italia, which aimed to free Italy and the Church from French and Imperial domination. This became clear in 1521, when a personal rivalry between King Francis I and Holy Roman Emperor Charles V boiled over into war in northern Italy. Francis I expected Giulio, France's cardinal protector, to support him; but Giulio perceived Francis as threatening the Church's independence—particularly the latter's control of Lombardy, and his use of the Concordat of Bologna to control the Church in France. At the time, the Church wanted Emperor Charles V to combat Lutheranism, then growing in Germany. So Cardinal Giulio negotiated an alliance on behalf of the Church, to support the Holy Roman Empire against France. That autumn, Giulio helped lead a victorious Imperial-Papal army over the French in Milan and Lombardy. While his strategy of shifting alliances to liberate the Church and Italy from foreign domination proved disastrous during his reign as Pope Clement VII, during the reign of Leo X it skillfully maintained a balance of power among the competing international factions seeking to influence the Church.

==== Armed conflicts ====
Giulio de' Medici led numerous armed conflicts as a cardinal. Commenting on this, his contemporary Francesco Guicciardini wrote that Cardinal Giulio was better suited to arms than to the priesthood. He served as papal legate to the army in a campaign against Francis I in 1515, alongside inventor Leonardo da Vinci.

==== Achievements ====
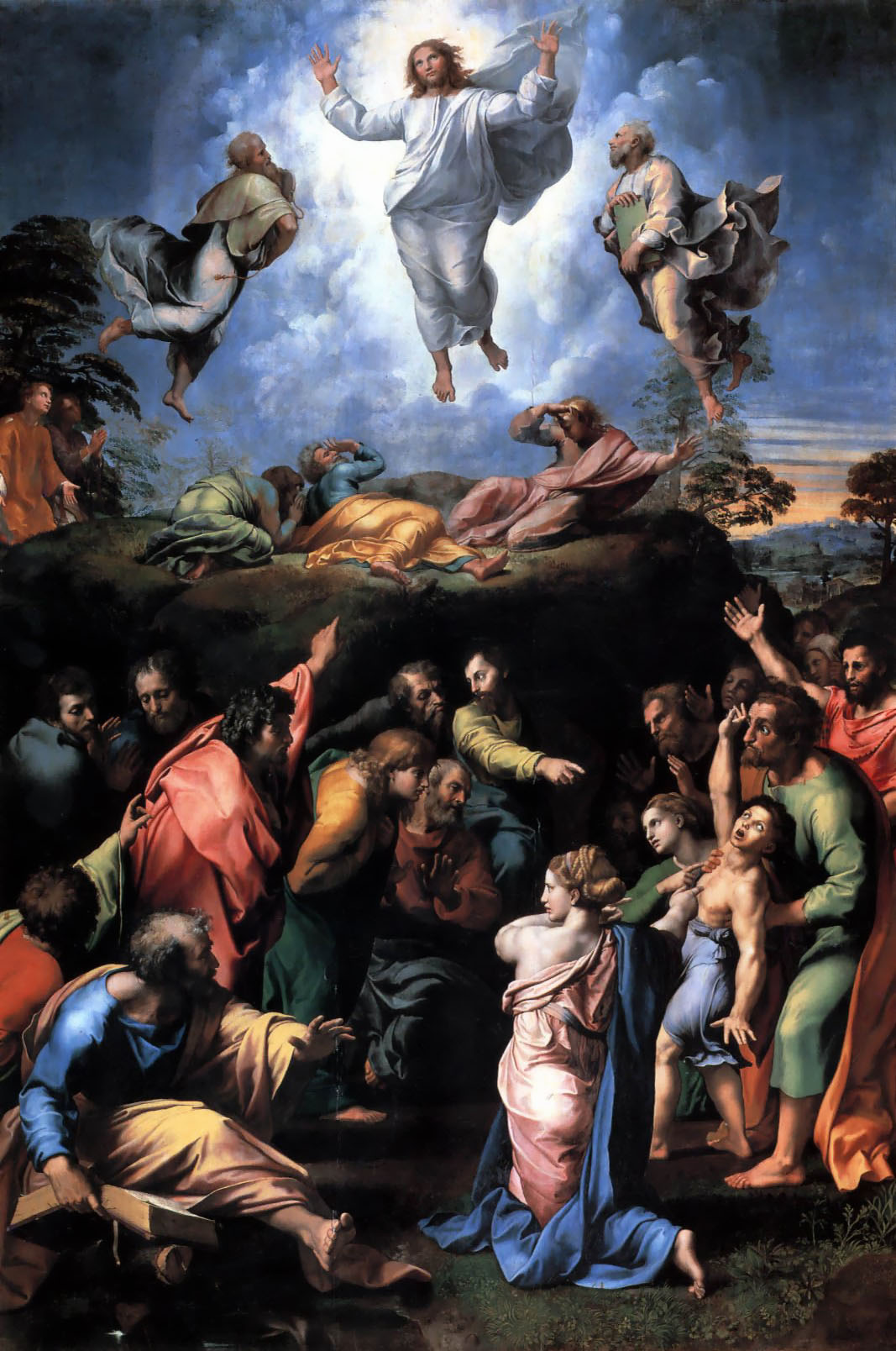
The Transfiguration, by Raphael, 1520. Commissioned by Cardinal Giulio de' Medici

Cardinal Giulio's other endeavors on behalf of Pope Leo X were similarly successful, such that "he had the credit of being the prime mover of papal policy throughout the whole of Leo's pontificate". In 1513, he was member of the Fifth Lateran Council, assigned the task of healing the schism caused by conciliarism. In 1515, his "most significant act of ecclesiastical government" regulated prophetic preaching in the manner of Girolamo Savonarola. He later organized and presided over the Florentine Synod of 1517, where he became the first member of the Church to implement the reforms recommended by the Fifth Lateran Council. These included prohibiting priests from carrying arms, frequenting taverns, and dancing provocatively – while urging them to attend weekly confession. Similarly, Cardinal Giulio's artistic patronage was admired (e.g., his commissioning Raphael's Transfiguration and Michelangelo's Medici Chapel, among other works), particularly for what goldsmith Benvenuto Cellini later called its "excellent taste".

=== Gran Maestro of Florence ===
Cardinal Giulio governed Florence between 1519 and 1523, following the death of its civic ruler, Lorenzo II de Medici, in 1519. There "he was permitted to assume almost autocratic control of State affairs", and "did very much to place public interests upon a firm and practical basis". U.S. President John Adams later characterized Giulio's administration of Florence as "very successful and frugal". Adams chronicles the cardinal as having "reduced the business of the magistrates, elections, customs of office, and the mode of expenditure of public money, in such a manner that it produced a great and universal joy among the citizens".

On the death of Pope Leo X in 1521, Adams writes there was a "ready inclination in all of the principal citizens [of Florence], and a universal desire among the people, to maintain the state in the hands of the Cardinal de' Medici; and all this felicity arose from his good government, which since the death of the Duke Lorenzo, had been universally agreeable."

=== Under Pope Adrian VI ===
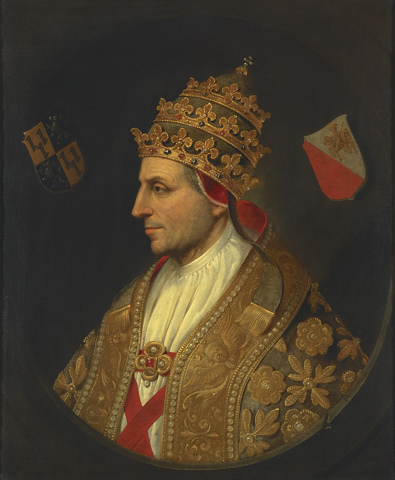
Portrait of Pope Adrian VI in the Rijksmuseum

When Pope Leo X died on 1 December 1521, Cardinal Giulio was "widely expected to succeed him"—but instead, during the conclave of 1522, the College of Cardinals elected a compromise candidate, Adrian VI of the Netherlands. Of why this happened, historian Paul Strathern writes, "it was common knowledge that [Cardinal Giulio] had been Leo X's most able adviser, as well as manager of the pope's financial affairs. The fact that Leo X had blithely ignored his cousin's advice, on so many occasions, was widely seen as being responsible for the plight of the papacy—not the influence of Cardinal Giulio de' Medici. On the contrary, Cardinal Giulio appeared to be everything that Leo X was not: he was handsome, thoughtful, saturnine and gifted with good taste. Despite this, many remained steadfast in their opposition to his candidacy."

In conclave, Cardinal Giulio controlled the largest voting bloc, but his enemies forced the election to a stalemate. Among them were Cardinal Francesco Soderini, a Florentine whose family had lost a power struggle to the Medici "and held a grudge"; Cardinal Pompeo Colonna, a Roman nobleman who wanted to become Pope himself; and a group of French cardinals who "were unwilling to forget Leo X's treachery to their King".

Realizing that his candidacy was in jeopardy, "Cardinal Giulio now chose to make an astute tactical move. He declared modestly that he was unworthy of such high office; instead, he suggested the little-known Dutch scholar Cardinal Adriaan Boeyens, an ascetic and deeply spiritual man who had been tutor to the Holy Roman Emperor Charles V. Cardinal Giulio was sure that Cardinal Boeyens would be rejected—on the grounds of his obscurity, his lack of political expertise and the fact that he was not Italian. The selfless suggestion that had been made by Cardinal Giulio de' Medici would then demonstrate to all that he was in fact the ideal candidate. But this move backfired badly, Cardinal Giulio's bluff was called and Cardinal Boeyens was elected as Pope Adrian VI."

During his 20-month papacy, Adrian VI "seemed to set great store by Cardinal Medici's opinions ... And all the other cardinals were kept distinctly at arm's-length." In this way, Cardinal Giulio "wielded formidable influence" throughout Adrian's reign. Splitting time between the Palazzo Medici in Florence and the Palazzo della Cancelleria in Rome, Cardinal Giulio "lived there as a generous Medici was expected to live, a patron of artists and musicians, a protector of the poor, a lavish host".

==== Assassination plot of 1522 ====
In 1522, rumors began to swirl that Cardinal Giulio—lacking legitimate successors to rule Florence—planned to abdicate rule of the city and "leave the government freely in the people". When it became clear that these rumors were untrue, a faction of mostly elite Florentines hatched a plot to assassinate him and then install their own government under his "great adversary", Cardinal Francesco Soderini. Soderini encouraged the plot, exhorting both Adrian and Francis I of France to strike against Giulio and invade his allies in Sicily. This did not happen. Instead of breaking with Giulio, Adrian had Cardinal Soderini imprisoned. Afterward, the principal conspirators were "declared rebels", and some were "apprehended and beheaded; by which means Giulio was again secured [as leader of Florence]."

== Pope ==
Following Adrian VI's death on 14 September 1523, Cardinal Giulio overcame the opposition of the French king and finally succeeded in being elected Pope Clement VII in the next conclave (19 November 1523).

Pope Clement VII brought to the papal throne a high reputation for political ability and his accomplishments were compared to those of a wily diplomat. But his contemporaries considered him worldly and indifferent to the perceived dangers of the Protestant Reformation.

At his accession, Clement VII sent the Archbishop of Capua, Nikolaus von Schönberg, to the kings of France, Spain, and England, in order to bring the Italian War to an end. An early report from the Protonotary Marino Caracciolo to the Emperor records: "As the Turks threaten to conquer Christian states, it seems to him that it is his first duty as Pope to bring about a general peace of all Christian princes, and he begs him (the Emperor), as the firstborn son of the Church, to aid him in this pious work." But the pope's attempt failed.

=== Continental and Medici politics ===
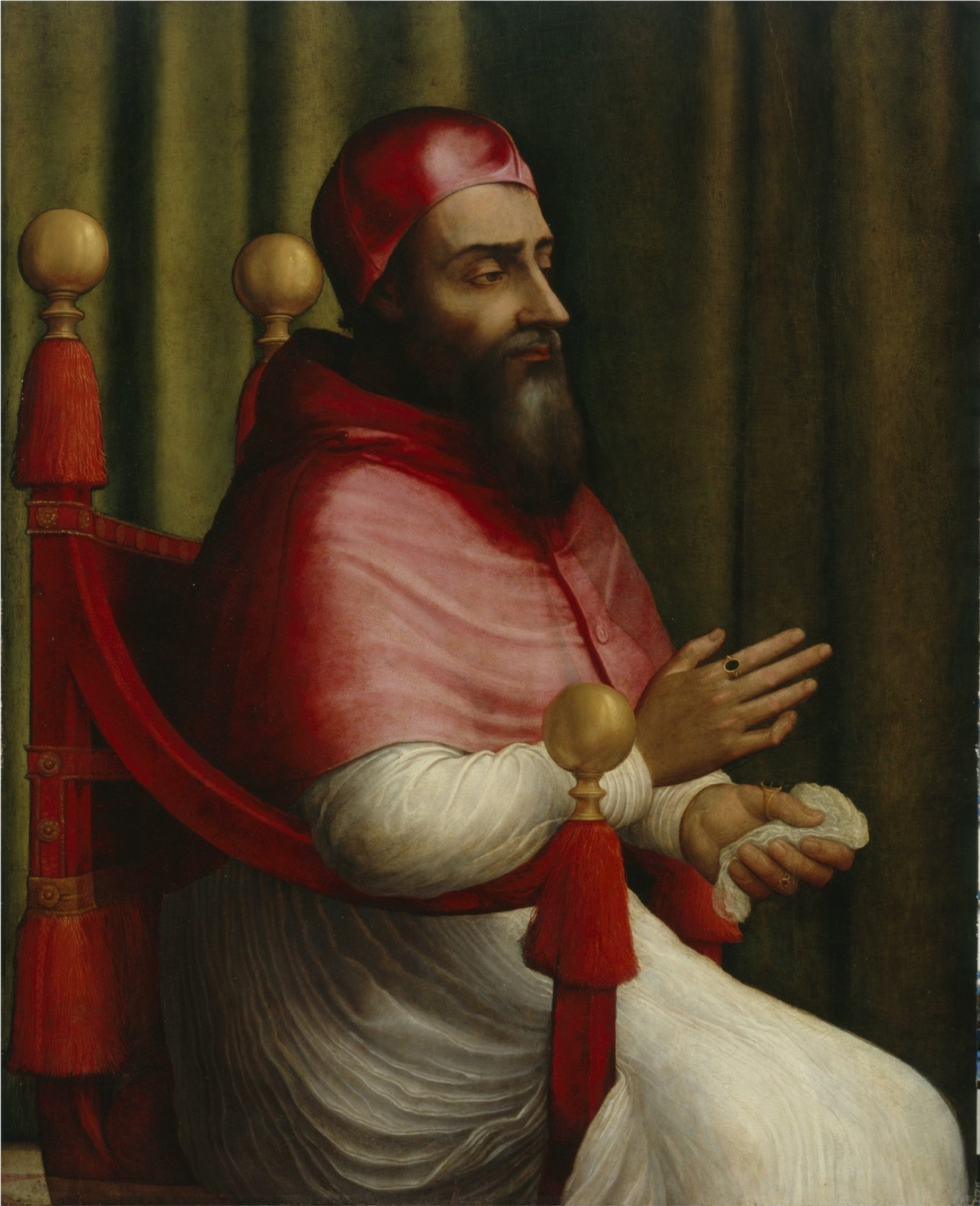
Portrait of Clement VII by Giuliano Bugiardini (c. 1532)

Francis I of France's conquest of Milan in 1524, during his Italian campaign of 1524–1525, prompted the Pope to quit the Imperial–Spanish side and to ally himself with other Italian princes, including the Republic of Venice, and France through a treaty of January 1525. This treaty granted the definitive acquisition of Parma and Piacenza for the Papal States, the rule of Medici over Florence and the free passage of the French troops to Naples. This policy in itself was sound and patriotic, but Clement VII's zeal soon cooled; by his want of foresight and unseasonable economy, he laid himself open to an attack from the turbulent Roman barons, which obliged him to invoke the mediation of the emperor, Charles V. One month later, Francis I was crushed and imprisoned in the Battle of Pavia, and Clement VII went deeper in his former engagements with Charles V, signing an alliance with the viceroy of Naples.

But deeply concerned about Imperial arrogance, he was to pick up with France again when Francis I was freed after the Treaty of Madrid (1526): the Pope entered into the League of Cognac together with France, Venice, and Francesco II Sforza of Milan. Clement VII issued an invective against Charles V, who in reply defined him a "wolf" instead of a "shepherd", menacing the summoning of a council about the Lutheran question.

Like his cousin Pope Leo X, Clement was considered too generous to his Medici relatives, draining the Vatican treasuries. This included the assignment of positions all the way up to Cardinal, lands, titles, and money. These actions prompted reform measures after Clement's death to help prevent such excessive nepotism.

=== Evangelization ===
In his 1529 bull Intra Arcana Clement VII gave a grant of permissions and privileges to Charles V and the Spanish Empire, which included the power of patronage within their colonies in the Americas.

=== Sack of Rome ===
The Pope's wavering politics also caused the rise of the Imperial party inside the Curia: Cardinal Pompeo Colonna's soldiers pillaged Vatican Hill and gained control of the whole of Rome in his name. The humiliated Pope promised therefore to bring the Papal States to the Imperial side again. But soon after, Colonna left the siege and went to Naples, not keeping his promises and dismissing the Cardinal from his charge. From this point on, Clement VII could do nothing but follow the fate of the French party to the end.

Soon he found himself alone in Italy too, as Alfonso I d'Este, duke of Ferrara, had supplied artillery to the Imperial army, causing the League Army to keep a distance behind the horde of Landsknechts led by Charles III, Duke of Bourbon and Georg von Frundsberg, allowing them to reach Rome without harm.

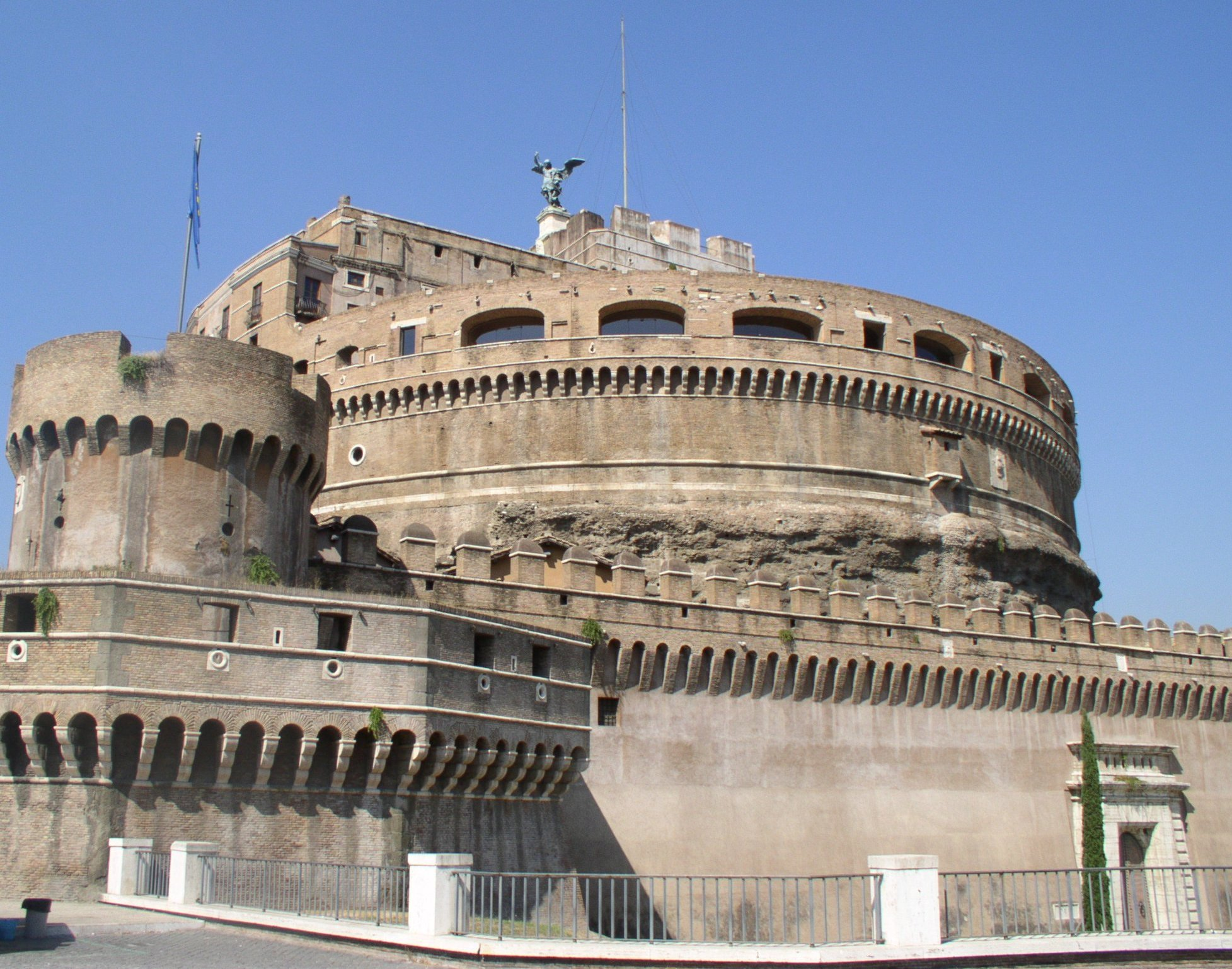
Castel Sant'Angelo

Charles of Bourbon died while mounting a ladder during the short siege and his starving troops, unpaid and left without a guide, felt free to ravage Rome from 6 May 1527. The many incidents of murder, rape, and vandalism that followed ended the splendours of Renaissance Rome forever. Clement VII, who had displayed no more resolution in his military than in his political conduct, was shortly afterwards (6 June) obliged to surrender himself together with the Castel Sant'Angelo, where he had taken refuge. He agreed to pay a ransom of 400,000 ducats in exchange for his life; conditions included the cession of Parma, Piacenza, Civitavecchia, and Modena to the Holy Roman Empire. (Only the last could be occupied in fact.) At the same time, Venice took advantage of his situation to capture Cervia and Ravenna while Sigismondo Malatesta returned to Rimini.

Clement was kept as a prisoner in Castel Sant'Angelo for six months. After having bought off some Imperial officers, he escaped disguised as a peddler and took shelter in Orvieto and then in Viterbo. He came back to a depopulated and devastated Rome only in October 1528.

Meanwhile, in Florence, Republican enemies of the Medici took advantage of the chaos to again expel the Pope's family from the city.

In June 1529 the warring parties signed the Peace of Barcelona. The Papal States regained some cities and Charles V agreed to restore the Medici to power in Florence. In 1530, after an eleven-month siege, the Tuscan city capitulated and Clement VII installed his illegitimate nephew Alessandro as duke. Subsequently, the Pope followed a policy of subservience to the emperor, endeavouring on the one hand to induce him to act with severity against the Lutherans in Germany and on the other to avoid his demands for a general council.

==== Appearance ====
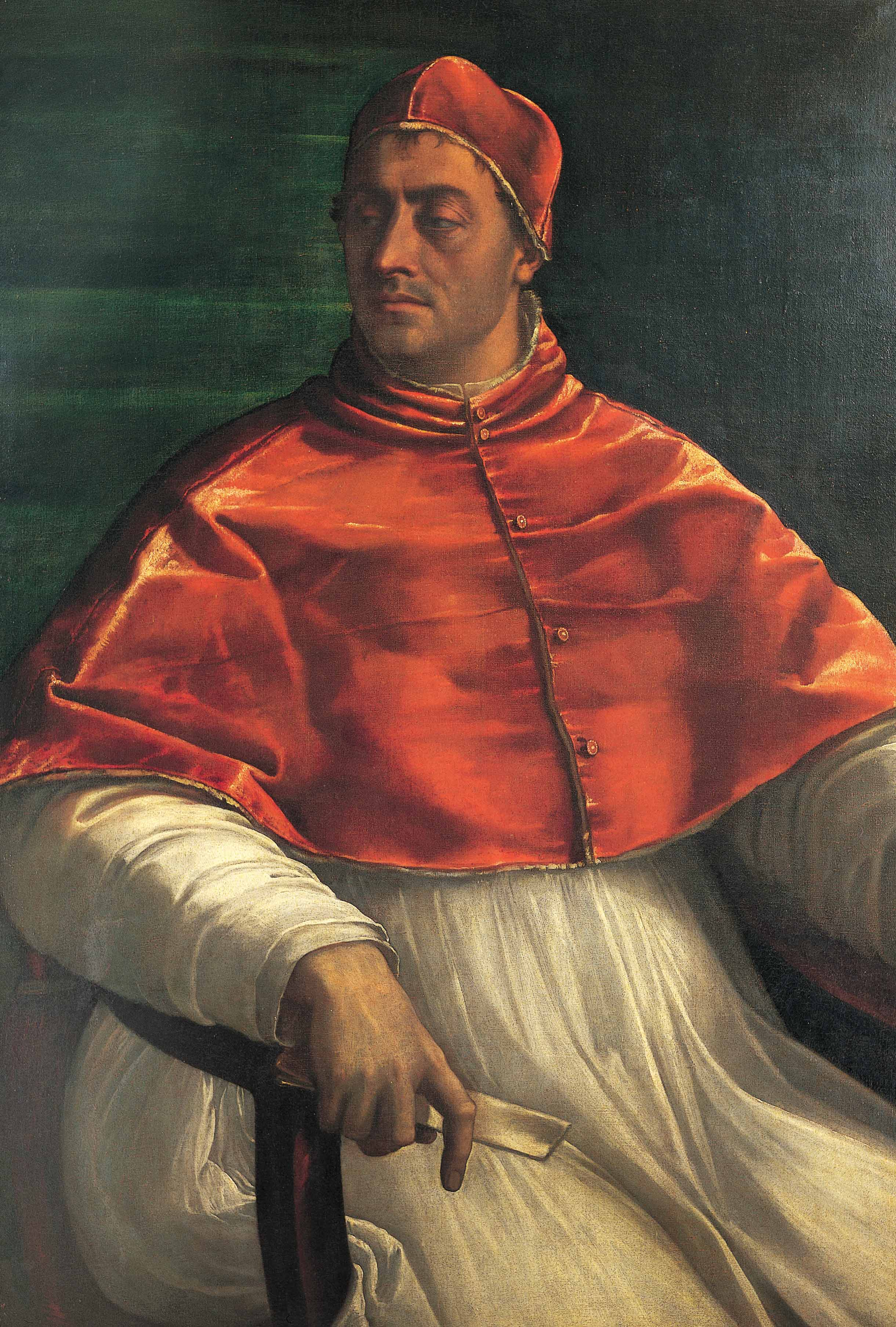
Clement VII, age 48 Portrait by Sebastiano del Piombo, 1526

During his half-year imprisonment in 1527, Clement VII grew a full beard as a sign of mourning for the sack of Rome. This was in contradiction to Catholic canon law, which required priests to be clean-shaven, but had as precedent the beard Pope Julius II wore for nine months in 1511–12 as a sign of mourning for the papal city of Bologna.

Unlike Julius II, however, Clement kept his beard until his death in 1534. His example in wearing a beard was followed by his successor, Paul III, and indeed by 24 popes after him, down to Innocent XII, who died in 1700. Clement was thus the unintentional originator of a fashion that lasted well over a century.

==== Ancona ====
In 1532, Clement VII took possession of Ancona, which definitively lost its freedom and became part of the Papal States, ending hundreds of years when the Republic of Ancona was an important maritime power.

=== English Reformation ===
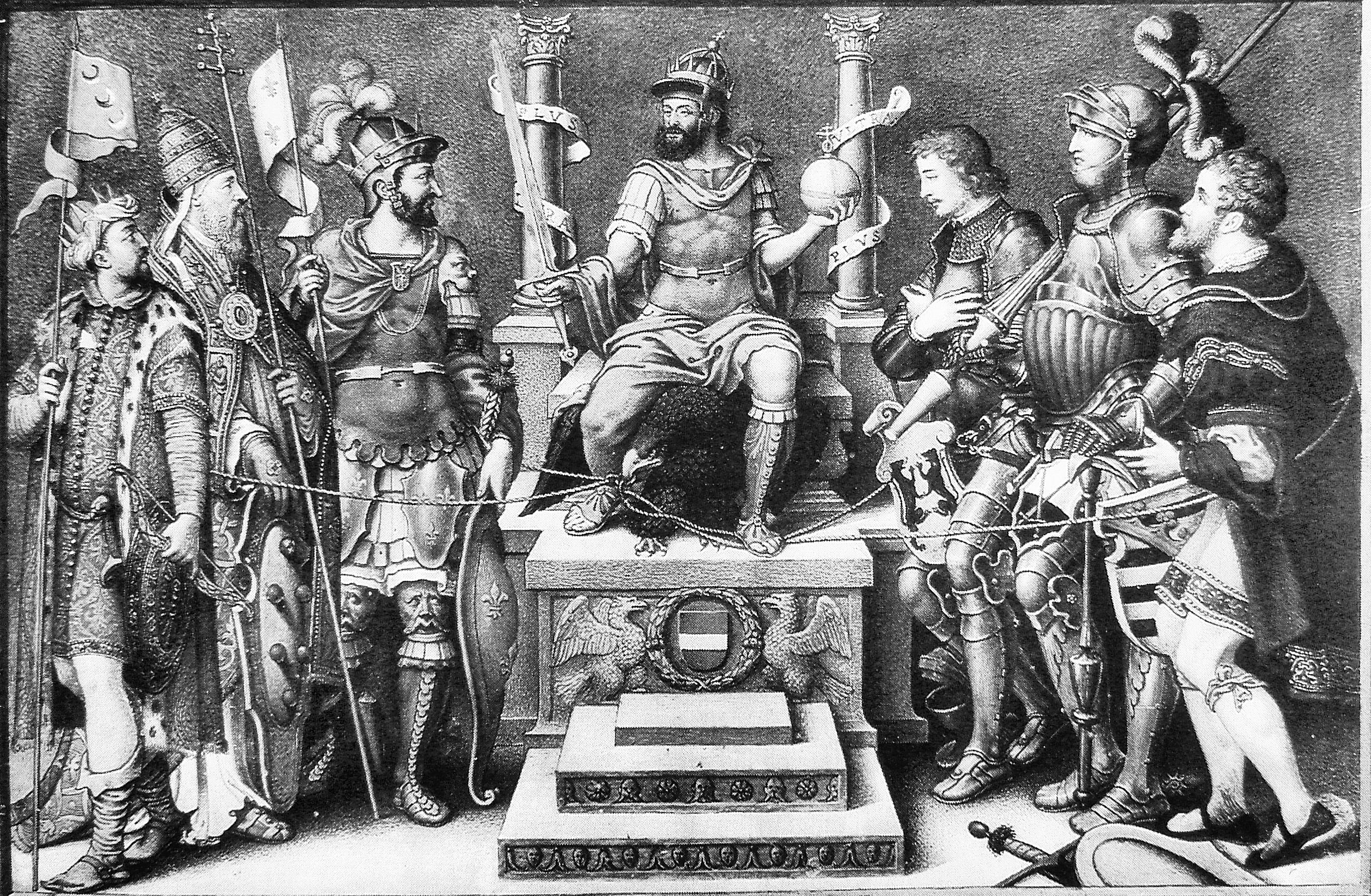
Charles V, enthroned over his defeated enemies (from left): Suleiman the Magnificent, Pope Clement VII, Francis I of France, the Duke of Cleves, the Elector of Saxony, and the Landgrave of Hesse. Giulio Clovio, mid-16th century

By the late 1520s, King Henry VIII wanted to have his marriage to Charles's aunt Catherine of Aragon annulled. The couple's sons died in infancy, threatening the future of the House of Tudor, although Henry did have a daughter, Mary Tudor. Henry claimed that this lack of a male heir was because his marriage was "blighted in the eyes of God". Catherine had been his brother's widow, but the marriage had been childless, so the marriage was not against Old Testament law, which forbids such unions only if the brother had children. Moreover, Pope Julius II had given a dispensation to allow the wedding. Henry now argued that this had been wrong and that his marriage had never been valid. In 1527 Henry asked Clement to annul the marriage, but the Pope, possibly acting under pressure from Catherine's nephew, Holy Roman Emperor Charles V, whose effective prisoner he was, refused. Pope Clement VII discreetly advised King Henry VIII to divorce Queen Catherine without seeking an official annulment, aiming to resolve the politically and personally sensitive situation surrounding the legitimacy of their marriage. Despite the Pope's counsel, Henry VIII remained committed to following the proper ecclesiastical procedures, insisting that any actions taken must align with the established norms of the Catholic Church. During these negotiations, Henry was represented at the papal court by Gregorio Casali, who had served as his permanent representative at the Curia since 1525. Casali worked through a wider family network, including his brothers and cousins, which provided the English Crown with contacts, information and other resources in Rome and elsewhere in Italy during the dispute over Henry's marriage. According to Catholic teaching, a validly contracted marriage is indivisible until death, and thus the pope cannot annul a marriage on the basis of an impediment previously dispensed. Many people close to Henry wished simply to ignore Clement, but in October 1530 a meeting of clergy and lawyers advised that the Parliament of England could not empower the Archbishop of Canterbury to act against the Pope's prohibition. In Parliament, Bishop John Fisher was the Pope's champion.

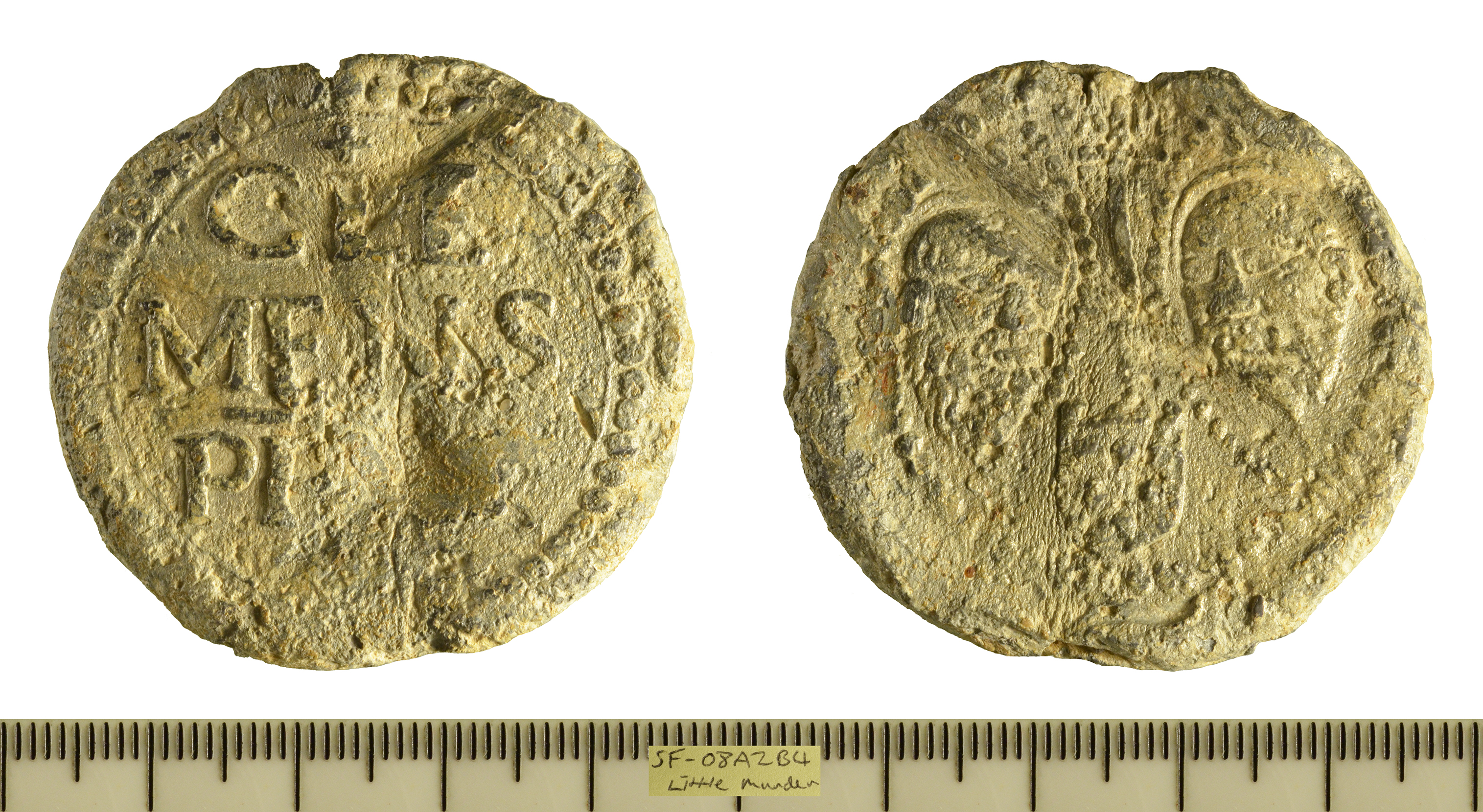
Lead bulla of Clement VII, found in Hertfordshire, England

Henry subsequently underwent a marriage ceremony with Anne Boleyn, in either late 1532 or early 1533. The marriage was made easier by the death of the Archbishop of Canterbury William Warham, a stalwart friend of the Pope, after which Henry persuaded Clement to appoint Thomas Cranmer, a friend of the Boleyn family, as his successor. The Pope granted the papal bulls necessary for Cranmer's promotion to Canterbury, and also demanded that Cranmer take the customary oath of allegiance to the pope before his consecration. Laws made under Henry already declared that bishops would be consecrated even without papal approval. Cranmer was consecrated, while declaring beforehand that he did not agree with the oath he would take. Cranmer was prepared to grant the annulment of the marriage to Catherine as Henry required. The Pope responded to the marriage by excommunicating both Henry and Cranmer from the Catholic Church.

Consequently, in England, in the same year, the Act of Conditional Restraint of Annates transferred the taxes on ecclesiastical income from the Pope to the Crown. The Peter's Pence Act outlawed the annual payment by landowners of one penny to the Pope. This act also reiterated that England had "no superior under God, but only your Grace" and that Henry's "imperial crown" had been diminished by the Pope's "unreasonable and uncharitable usurpations and exactions". Ultimately, in 1534, Henry led the English Parliament to pass the Act of Supremacy that established the independent Church of England and broke from the Catholic Church.

=== Marriage of Catherine de' Medici ===
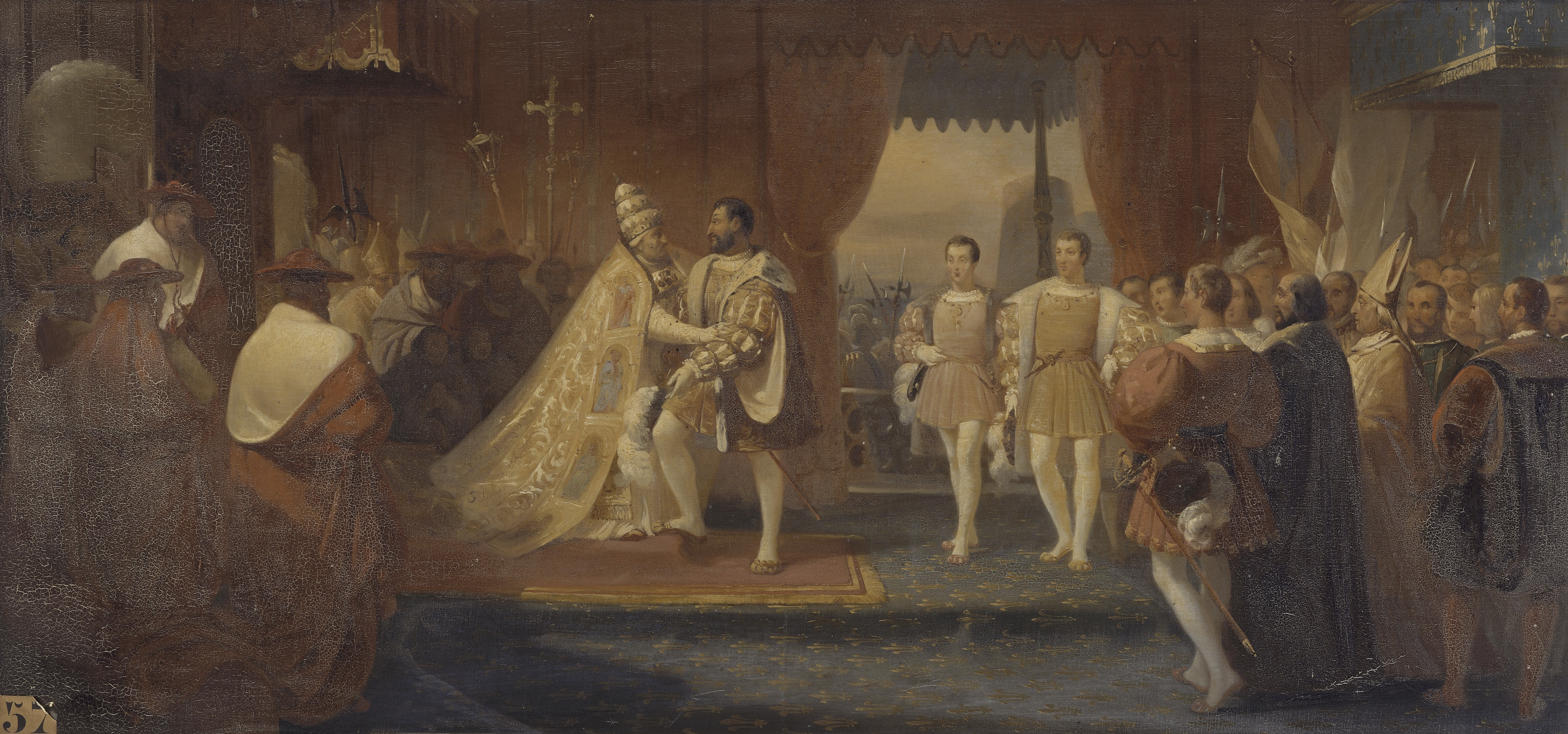
Meeting of Francis I and Pope Clement VII in Marseille, 13 October 1533

In 1533, Clement married his cousin's granddaughter, Catherine de' Medici, to the future King Henry II of France, son of King Francis I. Due to an illness, before setting out to Marseille for the wedding, Clement issued a Bull on 3 September 1533 giving instructions on what to do if he died outside Rome. The wedding ceremony took place at Église Saint-Ferréol les Augustins on 28 October 1533 and was conducted by Clement himself. It was "followed by nine days of lavish banquets, pageants, and festivities." On 7 November in Marseille, Clement created four new cardinals, all of them French. He also held separate, private meetings with Francis I and Charles V. Charles' daughter, Margaret of Austria was set to marry Clement's relative—Alessandro de' Medici, Duke of Florence—in 1536.

According to Medici historian Paul Strathern, Clement marrying Catherine into France's royal family and Alessandro becoming Duke of Florence and marrying into the Hapsburg family "marked perhaps the most significant turning point in the history of the Medici family—the ascent into nobility in Florence, and the joining of the French royal family. Without the guiding hand of Clement VII, the Medici would never have been able to achieve the pinnacles of greatness that were yet to come" in the following centuries.

== Death ==
On 10 December 1533, Clement returned to Rome with a fever and complaining of stomach problems. Strathern writes of how he had been ill for months: "[he] was aging rapidly...his liver was failing and his skin turned yellow; he also lost the sight of one eye and became partially blind in the other." He was so ill at the beginning of August 1534 that Cardinal Agostino Trivulzio wrote to King Francis that the Pope's doctors feared for his life.

On 23 September 1534, Clement wrote a long letter of farewell to Emperor Charles. He also affirmed, just days before his death, that Michelangelo should paint The Last Judgment above the altar in the Sistine Chapel. Clement VII died just two days later, on 25 September 1534, having lived 56 years and four months, reigning for 10 years, 10 months, and 7 days. His body was interred in Saint Peter's Basilica, and later transferred to a tomb in Santa Maria sopra Minerva in Rome, which was designed by Baccio Bandinelli.

Clement's biographer Emmanuel Rodocanachi writes that "in accordance with the custom of those times, people attributed his death to poison"—specifically, poisoning by death cap mushroom. Clement's symptoms and the length of his illness do not, however, support the hypothesis that he had been poisoned with death cap mushroom.

== Legacy ==
=== Political legacy ===
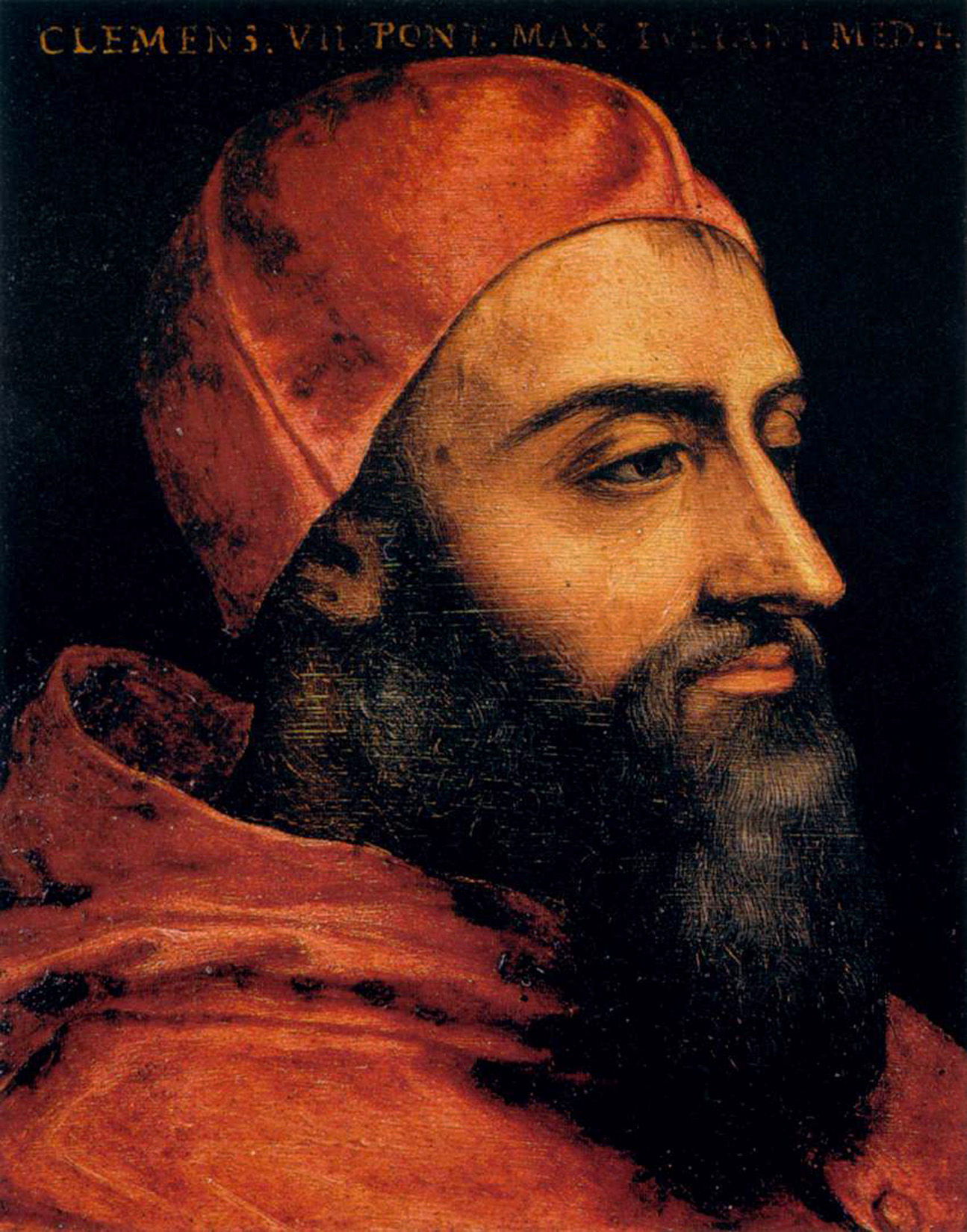
Agnolo Bronzino – Portrait of Pope Clement VII

Clement VII's papacy is generally regarded as one of history's most tumultuous; opinions of Clement himself are often nuanced. For example, Clement's contemporary Francesco Vettori writes that he "endured a great labor to become, from a great and respected cardinal, a small and little-esteemed pope", but also that "if one considers the lives of previous popes one may truly say that, for more than a hundred years, no better man than Clement VII sat upon the Throne. Nevertheless, it was in his day that the disaster took place while these others, who were filled with all vices, lived and died in felicity—as the world sees it. Neither should we seek to question the Lord, our God, who will punish—or not punish–in what manner and in what time it pleases him."

The disasters of Clement's pontificate—the Sack of Rome and the English Reformation—are regarded as turning points in the histories of Catholicism, Europe, and the Renaissance. Modern historian Kenneth Gouwens writes, "Clement's failures must be viewed above all in the context of major changes in the dynamics of European politics. As warfare on the Italian peninsula intensified in the mid-1520s, the imperative of autonomy [for the Catholic Church and Italy] required enormous financial outlays to field standing armies. Political survival perforce eclipsed ecclesiastical reform as a short-term goal, and the costs of war necessitated the curtailment of expenditure on culture. Clement pursued policies consistent with those of his illustrious predecessors Julius II and Leo X; but in the 1520s, those policies could but fail.... Reform of the Church, to which his successors would turn, required resources and concerted secular support that the second Medici pope was unable to muster."

Regarding Clement's struggle to liberate Italy and the Catholic Church from foreign domination, historian Fred Dotolo writes that "one might see in his papacy a vigorous defense of papal rights against the growth of monarchial power, a diplomatic and even pastoral struggle to retain the ancient division within Christendom of the priestly and kingly offices. Should the new monarchs of the early modern period reduce the papacy to a mere appendage of secular authority, religious issues would become little more than state policy.... Clement VII attempted to restrain the expansion of royal power and maintain the independence of Rome and of papal prerogatives."

Ecclesiastically, Clement is remembered for orders protecting Jews from the Inquisition, approving the Theatine, Barnabite, and Capuchin Orders, and securing the island of Malta for the Knights of Malta.

In a final analysis of Clement's papacy, historian E.R. Chamberlin writes, "in all but his personal attributes, Clement VII was a protagonist in a Greek tragedy, the victim called upon to endure the results of actions committed long before. Each temporal claim of his predecessors had entangled the Papacy just a little more in the lethal game of politics, even while each moral debasement divorced it just a little more from the vast body of Christians from whom ultimately it drew its strength." More charitably, modern historian James Grubb writes, "indeed, at a certain point it is difficult to see how he might have fared much better, given the obstacles he faced. Certainly his predecessors since the end of the Schism had experienced their share of opposition, but did any have to fight on so many fronts as Clement, and against such overwhelming odds? At one time or another he battled the Holy Roman Empire (now fueled by precious metals from America), the French, the Turks, rival Italian powers, fractious forces within the papal states, and entrenched interests within the Curia itself. That the precious liberta d'Italia (freedom from outside domination) should have been lost irrevocably seems more an inevitability than a product of Clement's particular failings. He tried his utmost...."

=== Portrayals ===
The life of the second Medici pope has been portrayed numerous times in films and television, notably the Netflix series Medici: The Magnificent, where the figure is portrayed by British actor Jacob Dudman.

=== Patronage ===
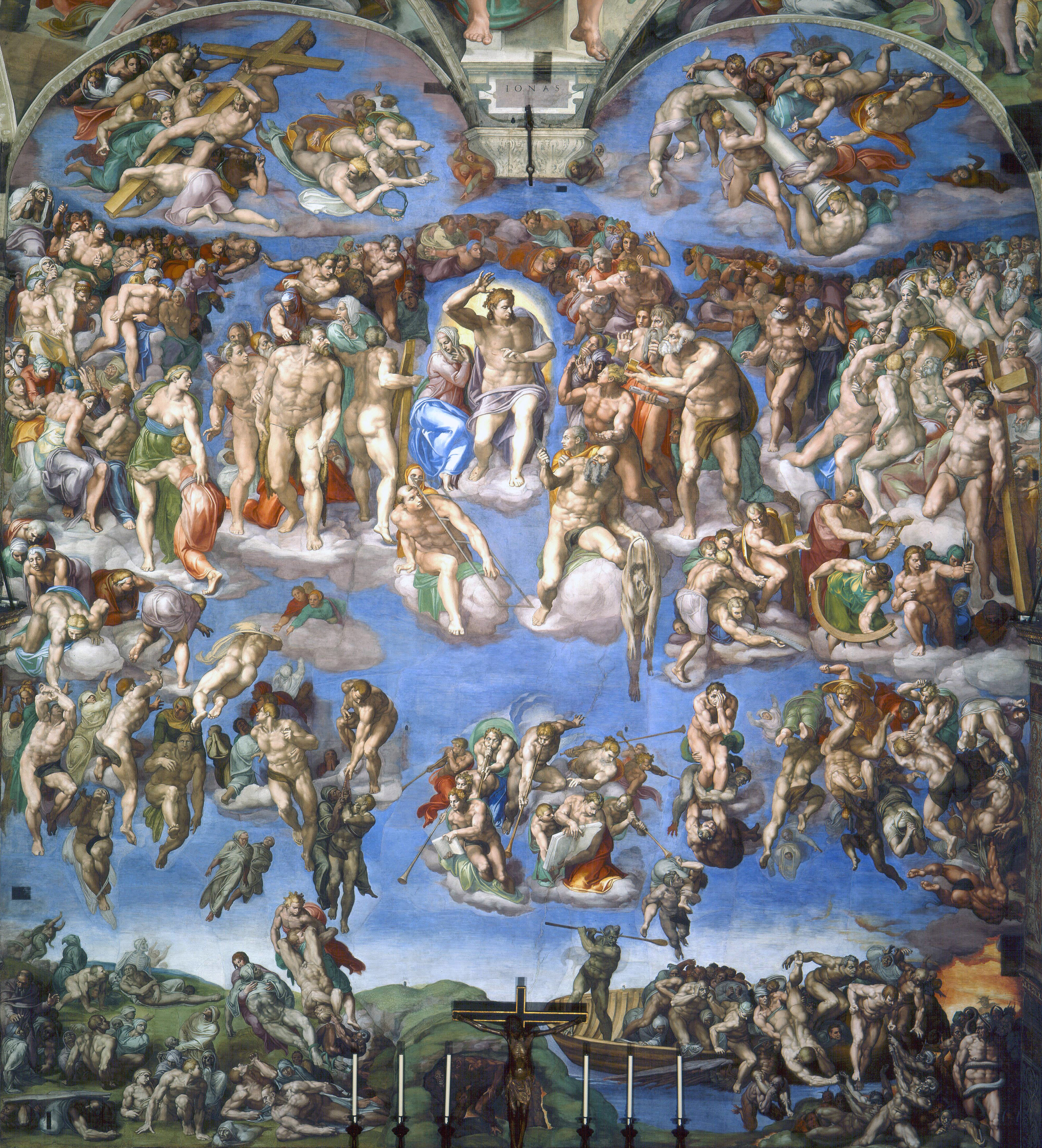
The Last Judgement by Michelangelo, commissioned by Pope Clement VII

As both a cardinal and Pope, Giulio de' Medici "commissioned or supervised many of the best-known artistic undertakings of the cinquecento." Of those works, he's best known for Michelangelo's monumental fresco in the Sistine Chapel, The Last Judgment; Raphael's iconic altarpiece The Transfiguration; Michelangelo's sculptures for the Medici Chapel in Florence; Raphael's architectural Villa Madama in Rome; and Michelangelo's innovative Laurentian Library in Florence. "As a patron, [Giulio de' Medici] proved extraordinarily confident in technical affairs," which allowed him to suggest workable architectural and artistic solutions for commissions ranging from Michelangelo's Laurentian Library to Benvenuto Cellini's celebrated Papal Morse. As Pope, he appointed goldsmith Cellini head of the Papal Mint; and painter Sebastiano del Piombo keeper of the Papal Seal. Following the 1527 Sack of Rome, he took refuge in Orvieto and commissioned architect Antonio da Sangallo the Younger to construct a deep, double-helix well (later known as the Pozzo di San Patrizio), a monumental, inverted tower of renaissance geometry and Chiaroscuro. Sebastiano's tour de force, The Raising of Lazarus, was produced via a contest arranged by Cardinal Giulio, pitting Sebastiano in direct competition with Raphael over who could produce the better altarpiece for the Narbonne Cathedral. When he promised Raphael's Portrait of Leo X to Federico II Gonzaga of Mantua, he secretly commissioned Andrea del Sarto to paint an exact replica; the copy was sent to Mantua in place of the original and successfully deceived both the Duke and Raphael's former pupil Giulio Romano.

Giulio de' Medici's patronage extended to theology, literature, and science. Some of the best known works associated with him are Erasmus' On Free Will, which he encouraged in response to Martin Luther's critiques of the Catholic Church; Machiavelli's Florentine Histories, which he commissioned; and Copernicus' heliocentric idea, which he personally approved in 1533. When Johann Widmanstetter explained the Copernican system to him, he was so grateful that he gave Widmanstetter a valuable gift. In 1531 Clement issued rules for the oversight of human cadaver dissection and medical test trials, a sort of primitive code of medical ethics. Humanist and author Paolo Giovio was his personal physician.

Giulio de' Medici was a talented musician, and his circle included many well-known artists and thinkers of the Italian High Renaissance. For example, "in the days before his papacy, the future Clement VII had been close to Leonardo da Vinci," with Leonardo gifting him a painting, the Madonna of the Carnation. He was a patron of the satirist Pietro Aretino, who "wrote a series of viciously satirical lampoons supporting the candidacy of Giulio de' Medici for the papacy." As Pope, he appointed author Baldassare Castiglione as Papal diplomat to Holy Roman Emperor Charles V; and historian Francesco Guicciardini as governor of the Romagna, the northernmost province of the Papal States.

==== The Clementine Style ====
Italian Renaissance artistic trends from 1523 to 1527 are sometimes called the "Clementine style", and notable for their technical virtuosity. In 1527, the Sack of Rome "put a brutal end to an artistic golden age, the Clementine style that had developed in Rome since the coronation of the Medici Pope". André Chastel describes the artists who worked in the Clementine style as Parmigianino, Rosso Fiorentino, Sebastiano del Piombo, Benvenuto Cellini, Marcantonio Raimondi, and numerous associates of Raphael: Giulio Romano, Giovanni da Udine; Perino del Vaga; and Polidoro da Caravaggio. During the Sack, several of these artists were either killed, made prisoner, or took part in the fighting.

=== Character ===
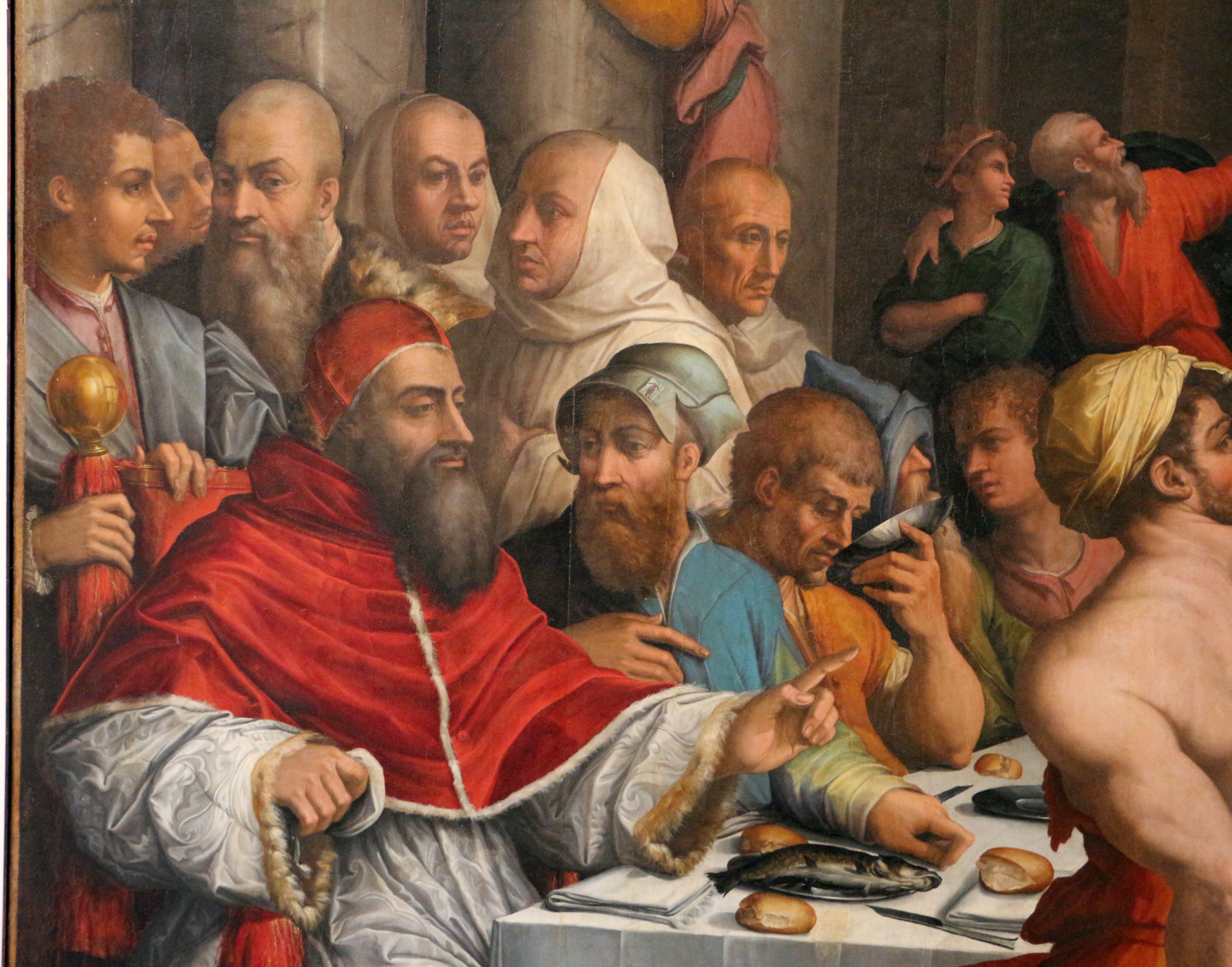
Pope Clement VII as Saint Gregory the Great by Giorgio Vasari

Clement was renowned for his intelligence and counsel, but maligned for his inability to take timely and decisive action. Historian G.F. Young writes, "he spoke with equal knowledge of his subject whether that were philosophy and theology, or mechanics and hydraulic architecture. In all affairs he displayed an extraordinary acuteness; the most perplexing questions were unravelled, the most difficult circumstances penetrated to the very bottom, by his extreme sagacity. No man could debate a point with more address." Historian Paul Strathern writes, "his inner life was illuminated by an unwavering faith;" he was also in "surprisingly close contact with the ideals [of Renaissance humanism], and even more surprisingly was deeply sympathetic to them." For example, "Clement VII had no difficulty in accepting Copernicus's heliocentric idea, and appeared to see no challenge to his faith in its implications; his Renaissance humanism was open to such progressive theories." Of Clement's other qualities, Strathern writes "he had inherited his murdered father's good looks, though these tended to lapse into a dark scowl rather than a smile. He also inherited something of his great-grandfather Cosimo de' Medici's skill with accounts, as well as a strong inclination to his legendary caution, making the new pope hesitant when it came to taking important decisions; and unlike his cousin Leo X, he possessed a deep understanding of art."

Of Clement's limitations, historian Francesco Guicciardini writes, "although he had a most capable intelligence and marvelous knowledge of world affairs, he lacked the corresponding resolution and execution.... He remained almost always in suspension and ambiguous when he was faced with deciding those things that from afar he had many times foreseen, considered, and almost revealed." Strathern writes that Clement was "a man of almost icy self-control, but in him the Medici trait of self-contained caution had deepened into a flaw.... If anything, Clement VII had too much understanding—he could always see both sides of any particular argument. This had made him an excellent close adviser to his cousin Leo X, but hampered his ability to take matters into his own hands." The Catholic Encyclopedia notes that while his "private life was free from reproach and he had many excellent impulses ... despite good intention, all qualities of heroism and greatness must emphatically be denied him."

== See also ==
- Republic of Florence
- Italian Wars
- Medici family
- List of popes from the Medici family
- Cardinals created by Clement VII
- Tour Grimaldi

Catholic Church titles
Preceded by Cosimo de' Pazzi	Archbishop of Florence; 1513–1523	Succeeded by Cardinal Nicolò Ridolfi
Preceded by Cardinal Guillaume Briçonnet	Archbishop of Narbonne; 1515–1523	Succeeded by Cardinal Jean de Lorraine
Preceded by Giovanni Battista Orsini	Apostolic Administrator of Bitonto; 8 February – November 1517	Succeeded by Giacomo Orsini
Preceded by Cardinal Achille Grassi	Bishop of Bologna; 8 January – 3 March 1518	Succeeded by Cardinal Lorenzo Campeggi
Preceded by Cardinal Niccolò Fieschi	Apostolic Administrator of Embrun; 5–30 July 1518	Succeeded by François de Tournon
Preceded by Girolamo Ghinucci	Apostolic Administrator of Ascoli Piceno; 30 July – 3 September 1518	Succeeded by Filos Roverella
Preceded by Cardinal Ippolito d'Este	Bishop of Eger; 1520–1523	Succeeded by Pál Várdai
Preceded by Silvestro de' Gigli	Apostolic Administrator of Worcester; 1521–1522	Succeeded by Cardinal Girolamo Ghinucci
Preceded by Adrian VI	Pope; 19 November 1523 – 25 September 1534	Succeeded by Paul III

== Sources ==
- Hersey, George L. (1993). High Renaissance Art in St. Peter's and the Vatican: An Interpretive Guide. The University of Chicago Press.
- Reynolds, Anne (2016). "The Papal Court in Exile: Clement VII in Orvieto, 1527–28". In Gouwens, Kenneth; Reiss, Sheryl E. (eds.). The Pontificate of Clement VII: History, Politics, Culture. Ashgate Publishing. pp. 143–164.
- Visceglia, Maria Antonietta (2006). "A comparative historiographic reflection on sovereignty in early modern Europe: interregnum rites and papal funerals". In Schilling, Heinz; Tóth, István György (eds.). Cultural Exchange in Early Modern Europe. Cambridge University Press. pp. 162–190.
