= Robert Morton (bishop) =

15th-century Bishop of Worcester

- Bishop of Worcester
- Appointed: 16 October 1486
- Term ended: May 1497
- Predecessor: John Alcock
- Successor: Giovanni de' Gigli

Orders
- Consecration: 28 January 1487

Personal details
- Died: May 1497
- Denomination: Roman Catholic

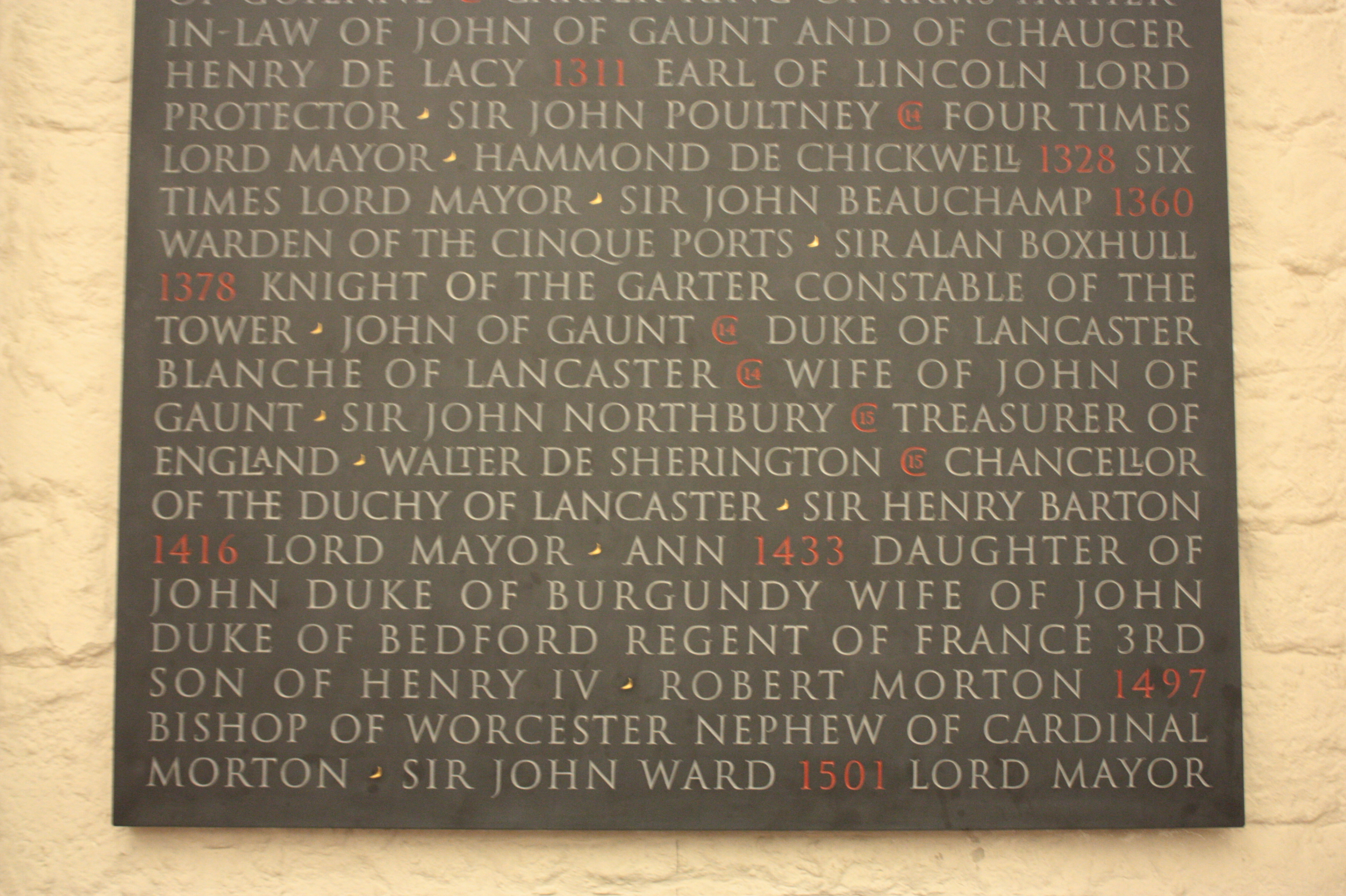
Morton's name on the Memorial to graves destroyed in Old St Paul's Cathedral

Robert Morton (1435–May 1497) was an English priest and Bishop of Worcester.

== Life ==
Morton was the son of William Morton, Member of Parliament for Shaftesbury, and the nephew of John Morton, the Archbishop of Canterbury.

Morton gained an MA from the University of Oxford in 1458 and was awarded an LLD by them in 1480 as a way for the university to honour his uncle.

Morton received the benefice of All Saints', Huntington in 1458, and by the time he was elected to the episcopate in 1486, he was also the Prebendary of St Paul's, Salisbury, York, Beverley, and Wherwell Abbey, as well as the archdeacon of Gloucester and of Winchester.

On 9 January 1479 Morton became Master of the Rolls, losing it on 22 September 1483 when his uncle opposed Richard III of England. Morton also played a part in the campaign against Richard, and was with Henry Tudor at the Battle of Bosworth. After Henry became king, Morton was again made Master of the Rolls on 13 November 1485.

Morton was appointed to the sixth stall in St George's Chapel, Windsor Castle in 1481 and held this until 1486.

On 16 October 1486, Morton became Bishop of Worcester, and he was consecrated on 28 January 1487. On 15 March 1497, he received a pardon from Henry VII, which was intended to secure his property against extortions. He was the last English Bishop of Worcester before the English Reformation, with his successors being Italian, and served until his death in May 1497. He was buried in Old St Paul's Cathedral rather than his own Worcester Cathedral. As a result, his grave and monument were destroyed in the Great Fire of London in 1666. His name is now listed on a monument in the crypt giving the names of important graves lost.

Due to the large absence of material on his life from 1458 to 1477, where Morton is recorded receiving a papal dispensation, he is sometimes considered to be the same man as Robert Morton, a composer who lived at around the same time.

== Citations ==
Catholic Church titles
Preceded by John Alcock	Bishop of Worcester; 1486–1497	Succeeded by Giovanni de' Gigli
