= Giovanni de' Gigli =

15th-century Bishop of Worcester

- Bishop of Worcester
- Appointed: 30 August 1497
- Term ended: 25 August 1498
- Predecessor: Robert Morton
- Successor: Silvestro de' Gigli

Orders
- Consecration: 10 September 1497

Personal details
- Died: 25 August 1498
- Denomination: Catholic

Giovanni de' Gigli was a fifteenth-century canon of Wells and Bishop of Worcester. He was nominated to the bishopric on 30 August 1497 and consecrated on 10 September 1497. However, before he could return to England to serve as bishop, he died in Rome on 25 August 1498.

== Citations ==
Catholic Church titles
Preceded by Robert Morton	Bishop of Worcester; 1497–1498	Succeeded by Silvestro de' Gigli
