= Lorenzo Campeggio =

Italian cardinal and politician (1474–1539)

His Eminence Lorenzo Campeggio
- Cardinal-Bishop of Sabina; Cardinal protector of England
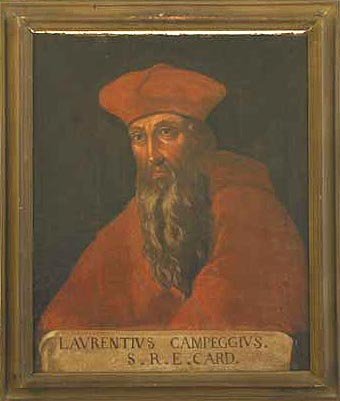
- Diocese: Sabina
- Appointed: 28 November 1537
- Term ended: 19 July 1539
- Predecessor: Bonifacio Ferrero
- Successor: Antonio Sanseverino
- Previous post: Bishop of Feltre (1512‍–‍1520)

Orders
- Consecration: 6 April 1518
- Created cardinal: 1 July 1517 by Leo X
- Rank: Cardinal-Priest (1517–1534); Cardinal-Bishop (1534–1539)

Personal details
- Born: 7 November 1474 Milan, Duchy of Milan
- Died: 19 July 1539 (aged 64) Rome, Papal States
- Buried: (1) Santa Maria in Trastevere, Rome; (2) Santi Marta e Bernardino, Bologna
- Parents: Giovanni Zaccaria Campeggio and Dorotea Tebaldini
- Spouse: Francesca Guastavillani
- Children: 5

Lorenzo Campeggio (7 November 1474 – 19 July 1539) was an Italian cardinal and politician. He was the last cardinal protector of England.

== Life ==
Campeggio was born in Milan to a noble family, the eldest of five sons.

Campeggio initially intended to pursue a career in law, obtaining his degree in 1499. In 1510, following the death of his wife, Campeggio began to serve the Catholic Church.

In 1511 and from 1513 to 1517, Campeggio served as nuncio on two separate occasions to Maximilian I. In 1517, during his second period as nuncio to Maximilian I, Leo X made him a cardinal.

On 22 January 1523, Campeggio was appointed cardinal–protector of England. While in England, Campeggio was tasked with convincing Henry VIII to pledge his support to a planned crusade against Selim I that was envisioned by Leo X. In 1528, Campeggio returned to England in order to hear the case for divorce between Henry VIII and Catherine of Aragon. Due to the mental duress and his affliction with gout, this period of time was particularly unpleasant for Campeggio.

Campeggio wrote his De depravato statu ecclesiae for Adrian VI, which proposed radical reforms for the papal bureaucracy.

Catholic Church titles
Preceded by Antonio Pizzamano	Bishop of Feltre; 1512–1520	Succeeded by Tomaso Campeggi
New title	Cardinal-Priest of San Tommaso in Parione; 1517–1519	Succeeded by Girolamo Doria
Preceded by Antoine Bohier du Prat	Cardinal-Priest of Sant'Anastasia; 1519–1528	Succeeded by Antoine du Prat
Preceded by Achille Grassi (bishop)	Bishop of Bologna; 1523–1525	Succeeded by Andrea della Valle (administrator)
Preceded by Edmund Audley (bishop)	Administrator of Salisbury; 1524–1534	Succeeded by Nicholas Shaxton; As CofE bishop of Salisbury (unrecognized by Vatican)
Preceded by Edmund Audley (bishop)	Administrator of Salisbury; 1524–1534	Succeeded by Himself; As RC administrator of Salisbury (unrecognized by Crown)
Preceded by Francesco Armellini Pantalassi de' Medici	Cardinal-Priest of Santa Maria in Trastevere; 1528–1534	Succeeded by Antonio Sanseverino
Preceded by Diego de Cabrera (bishop)	Administrator of Huesca; 1530–1532	Succeeded by Jerónimo Doria (bishop)
Preceded by Girolamo Campeggi (bishop)	Administrator of Poreč (Parenzo); 1533–1537	Succeeded by Giovanni Campeggi (bishop)
Preceded by Himself; As administrator of Salisbury (recognized by both Crown and Vatican)	Administrator of Salisbury (unrecognized by Crown); 1534–1539	Succeeded by Gasparo Contarini (administrator)
Preceded by Giovanni Landi (archbishop)	Administrator of Candia; 1534–1536	Succeeded by Pietro Landi (archbishop)
Preceded by Bonifacio Ferrero	Cardinal-Bishop of Albano; 1534–1535	Succeeded by Matthäus Lang von Wellenburg
Preceded by Bonifacio Ferreri	Cardinal-Bishop of Palestrina; 1535–1537	Succeeded by Antonio Sanseverino
Preceded by Bonifacio Ferrero	Cardinal-Bishop of Sabina; 1537–1539	Succeeded by Antonio Sanseverino
