= Cardinal electors for the 1503 conclaves =

Two conclaves were held in 1503.

The first conclave was held following the death of Pope Alexander VI on August 18, 1503. This conclave lasted from September 16, 1503 to September 22, 1503 and ended in the election of Cardinal Francesco Piccolomini, who took the name of Pope Pius III.

The second conclave followed the death of Pope Pius III on October 18, 1503. This conclave lasted from October 31, 1503 to November 1, 1503 and ended in the election of Cardinal Giuliano della Rovere, who took the name of Pope Julius II.

== Participants in the conclaves of 1503 ==
The following table lists all cardinals eligible to vote in the papal conclaves of 1503 and indicates which conclaves each cardinal actually participated in.

Name	Nationality	Portrait	September conclave	October conclave
Giuliano della Rovere	Italian		Yes	Yes; Elected Pope
Jorge da Costa	Portuguese		Yes	Yes
Girolamo Basso della Rovere	Italian		Yes	Yes
Oliviero Carafa	Italian		Yes	Yes
Antonio Pallavicini Gentili	Italian		Yes	Yes
Lorenzo Cybo de Mari	Italian		Yes	Yes
Francesco Piccolomini	Italian		Yes; Elected Pope	†; Deceased
Raffaele Riario	Italian		Yes	Yes
Giovanni Colonna	Italian		Yes	Yes
Ascanio Sforza	Italian		Yes	Yes
Giovanni de' Medici	Italian		Yes	Yes
Federico di Sanseverino	Italian		Yes	Yes
Giovanni Antonio Sangiorgio	Italian		Yes	Yes
Bernardino López de Carvajal	Spanish		Yes	Yes
Giuliano Cesarini, iuniore	Italian		Yes	Yes
Domenico Grimani	Italian		Yes	Yes
Alessandro Farnese	Italian		Yes	Yes
Ippolito d'Este	Italian		No	Yes
Luigi d'Aragona	Italian		Yes	Yes
Juan de Castro	Spanish		Yes	Yes
Georges d'Amboise	French		Yes	Yes
Amanieu d'Albret	French		Yes	Yes
Pedro Luis de Borja Lanzol de Romaní	Spanish		Yes	Yes
Jaime Serra i Cau	Spanish (Valencian)		Yes	Yes
Pietro Isvalies	Italian		No	Yes
Francisco de Borja	Spanish		Yes	Yes
Juan de Vera	Spanish		Yes	Yes
Ludovico Prodocator	Cypriot		Yes	Yes
Antonio Trivulzio, seniore	Italian		Yes	Yes
Marco Cornaro	Italian		Yes	Yes
Gianstefano Ferrero	Italian		Yes	Yes
Juan Castellar y de Borja	Spanish		Yes	Yes
Francisco de Remolins	Spanish		Yes	Yes
Francesco Soderini	Italian		Yes	Yes
Niccolò Fieschi	Italian		Yes	Yes
Francisco Desprats	Spanish		Yes	Yes
Adriano Castellesi	Italian		Yes	Yes
Jaime de Casanova	Spanish		Yes	Yes
Francisco Lloris y de Borja	Spanish (Valencian)		Yes	Yes
Luis Juan del Milà	Spanish (Valencian)		No	No
Raymond Peraudi	French		No	No
Guillaume Briçonnet	French		No	No
Philippe de Luxembourg	French		No	No
Tamás Bakócz	Hungarian		No	No
Melchior von Meckau	German		No	No

Konrad Eubel provides a list of the cardinals at the Conclave of October 1503, in which he states that Melchior Cupis von Meckau was not present. Joannes Burchard, the papal Master of Ceremonies for the Conclave, does not include Von Meckau or his conclavists in his list of participants. There were thirty-nine cardinal electors present for the September conclave.

== See also ==
- List of popes
