= Francisco de Borja =

Spanish cardinal

His Eminence Francisco de Borja
- Archbishop of Cosenza
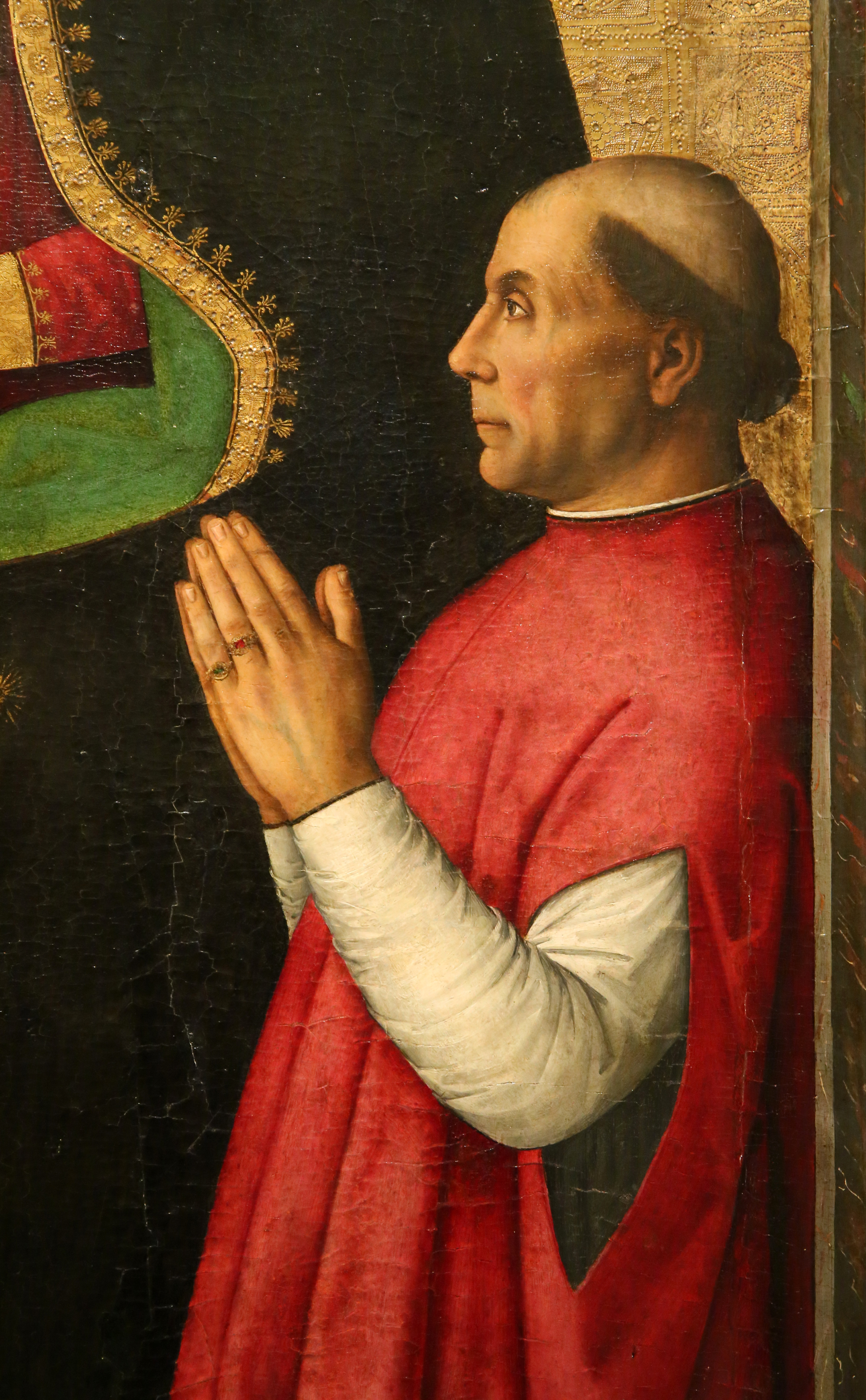
- Francisco de Borja depicted in Virgen de las Fiebres, painted by Pinturicchio, 1497
- Church: Catholic Church
- Appointed: 6 Nov 1499
- Term ended: 4 Nov 1511
- Predecessor: Ludovico Agnelli
- Successor: Giovanni Ruffo de Theodoli
- Other posts: Cardinal-Priest of Santi Nereo e Achilleo (1506-1511)

Orders
- Created cardinal: 28 September 1500 by Pope Alexander VI
- Rank: Cardinal-Priest

Personal details
- Born: Francisco de Borja y Navarro de Alpicat; 1441 Xàtiva, Kingdom of Valencia
- Died: 4 November 1511 (aged 69–70) Reggio Emilia, Italy

Francisco de Borja y Navarro de Alpicat (1441 – 4 November 1511) was a Spanish cardinal, and the seventh of ten cardinal-nephews created by Pope Alexander VI.

== Biography ==
Borja was born in 1441 in Xàtiva, Kingdom of Valencia, from the Aragonese family of Ça Borja established in Valencia since 1239 by land granted by the Aragon crown, He became a canon in the cathedral chapter of Valencia.

After the election of Rodrigo Borja as Alexander VI, Francisco went to Rome, becoming a protonotary apostolic, and then the treasurer general on 20 September 1493. He was elected bishop of Teano on 19 August 1495 and retained the see until 5 June 1508, when he resigned in favor of his nephew of the same name. There is no evidence he was ever consecrated. Alexander VI elevated Francisco as a cardinal priest on 28 September 1500, in pectore and published his cardinalate on 2 October, adding the title of S. Cecilia on 5 October.

He later accumulated a variety of additional benefices: first as Abbot commendatario of the monasteries of San Vincenzo al Volturno and of S. Stefano di Sermo, then the diocese of Terracina on 19 August 1495 and then the metropolitan see of Cosenza on 6 November 1499.

He was made papal legate to Campagna in 1501, and left Rome on 22 June to retake Rocca di Papa and other estates of the Colonna for the papacy. In 1502, he followed Lucrezia Borgia to Ferrara for her marriage to Alfonso d'Este, and became tutor to Alexander VI's youngest son, Giovanni Borgia (Infans Romanus).

From January 1503 to 1504, Borja held the title of Camerlengo, and during that time, on 10 March, he attempted to recover some debts owed to the College of Cardinals. He participated in the papal conclaves of September and October 1503, before gaining the title of Ss. Nereo ed Achilleo on 11 August 1506.

Along with other cardinals, Borja plotted against Pope Julius II, and from Ferrara published in opposition to the pontiff. His signature is also affixed to the document dated 16 March 1511, which attempted to bring the pope to a council in Pisa; Borja delegated his authority in absentia to the five other cardinals who attended the council. As a result, Borja was deprived of his cardinalate and excommunicated by Julius II on 24 October 1511. The other councilars—Cardinals Federico di Sanseverino, Bernardino López de Carvajal, Guillaume Briçonnet, René de Prie, and Amanieu d'Albret (another cardinal-nephew of Alexander VI)—were also excommunicated, but unlike Borja they lived long enough to be pardoned and have their cardinalates reinstated in 1513 by Pope Leo X. Before death, Borja was briefly protoprete from January 1511, dying on 4 November 1511 in Reggio Emilia (where he is buried) before having had the opportunity to learn of his excommunication.

== Popular culture ==
Francisco is referenced as a member of a conspiracy in the 2010 video game Assassin's Creed: Brotherhood.

== See also ==
- House of Borgia
- Route of the Borgias
