= Francisco de Remolins =

Spanish Roman Catholic bishop and cardinal

His Eminence Francisco de Remolins
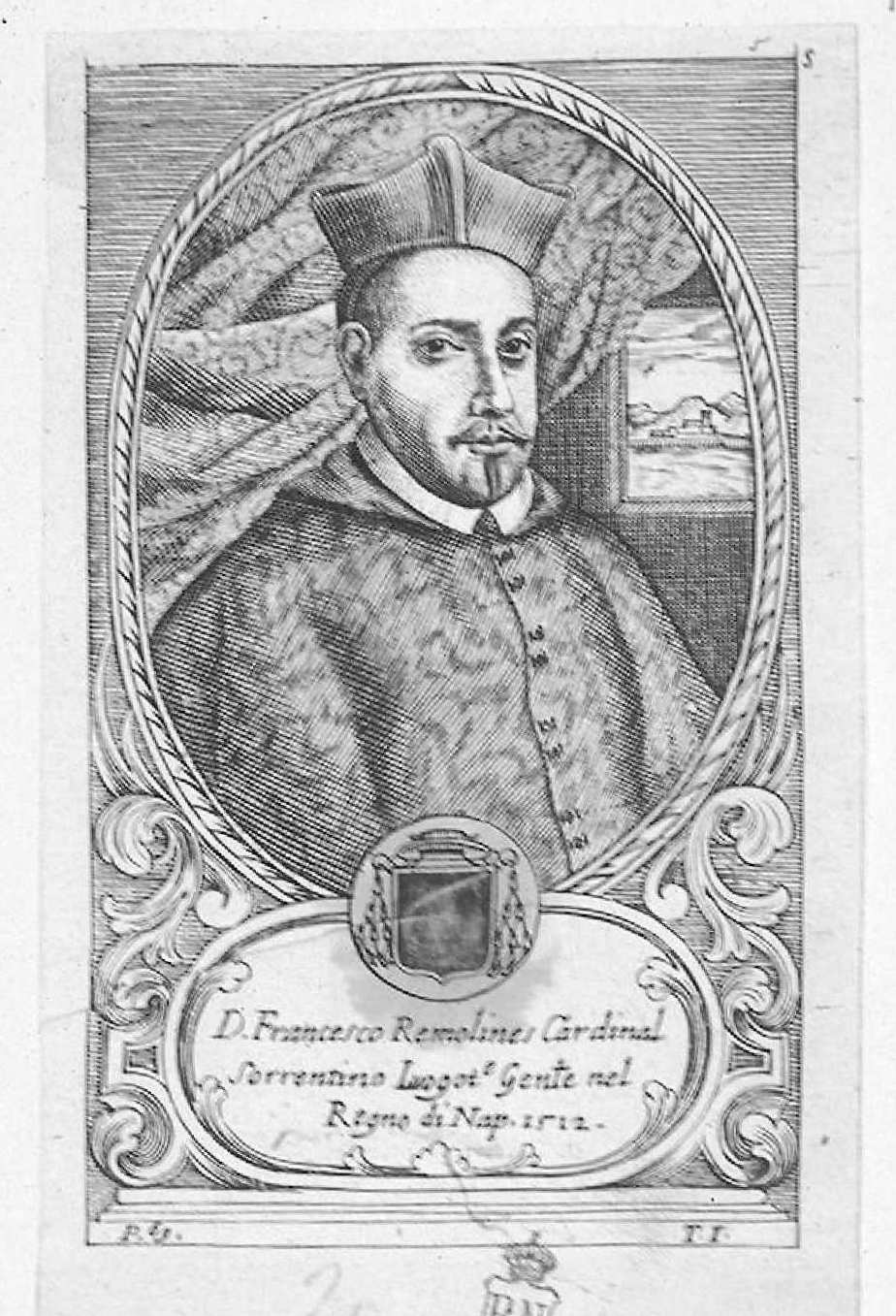
- Church: Roman Catholic Church

Orders
- Created cardinal: 31 May 1503 by Pope Alexander VI

Personal details
- Born: 1462 Lleida, Crown of Aragon
- Died: 5 February 1518 (aged 55–56) Rome, Papal States

Francisco de Remolins (1462 – 5 February 1518) (called the Cardinal of Sorrento and il cardinale Elvense) was a Spanish Roman Catholic bishop and cardinal.

== Biography ==
Francisco de Remolins was born in Lleida in 1462. He studied law at the University of Lleida, and then at the University of Pisa, from which he received a doctorate of both laws.

Remolins married as a young man, but his marriage was annulled and the young woman entered a convent. Remolins received the tonsure and then became a secretary to Ferdinand II of Aragon. The king later appointed him as his ambassador to the Holy See. He then became a preceptor to Cesare Borgia.

Remolins became cantor of the cathedral chapter of Mazzara. He then became a protonotary apostolic. He was later an auditor of the Roman Rota and an auditor of the governor of Rome.

In 1496 Cardinal Luis Julian de Milà, Bishop of Lleida, named him auxiliary bishop of Lleida. He was consecrated as a bishop by Cardinal de Milà ca. 1496.

In 1498 he was sent to Florence along with Gioacchino Torriani, Master of the Order of Preachers, as Commissary Apostolic to initiate process against Girolamo Savonarola; Savonarola was sentenced to death on 18 May 1498.

Because of his family's closeness to Pope Alexander VI, he then resigned as auxiliary bishop of Lleida to join the papal court. In February 1501, the pope appointed him governor of Rome; as governor, he carried on a bloody repression of the pope's enemies, the Colonna family and the Orsini family.

He was named Archbishop of Sorrento on 3 March 1501; he held this office until 23 January 1512. He was taken prisoner by the Ottoman Empire and had to be ransomed by the church.

Pope Alexander VI made him a cardinal priest in the consistory of 31 May 1503. He received the titular church of Santi Giovanni e Paolo on 12 June 1503.

He served as apostolic administrator of the see of Perugia from 4 August 1503 until March 1506.

He participated in both the papal conclave of September 1503 that elected Pope Pius III and the papal conclave of October 1503 that elected Pope Julius II.

Following the election of Pope Julius II, Cardinal Remolins feared reprisals against the House of Borgia and therefore escaped from Rome on 20 December 1503. The pope, however, wrote him a conciliatory letter and the cardinal returned to Rome and entered the pope's service.

As a diplomat, he secured the devolution of the Romagna from the Republic of Venice. Also, in the course of the Italian War of 1499–1504, he acted in the service of Ferdinand II of Aragon against Louis XII of France.

In 1504, he became Bishop of Fermo, occupying this see until his death, though without ever visiting the diocese in person. In 1511, he replaced Ramón de Cardona as Viceroy of Naples, holding this office until 1513.

He opted for the titular church of San Marcello al Corso on 27 October 1511, though also retaining the titulus of Santi Giovanni e Paolo in commendam until 6 July 1517. At the end of 1511, he became archpriest of the Basilica di Santa Maria Maggiore. He attended the Fifth Council of the Lateran (1512–17). On 23 January 1512 he became the apostolic administrator of the see of Palermo; he held this post until his death. He played a part in establishing the Roman Inquisition in Palermo; he was a great supporter of the Inquisition.

He participated in the papal conclave of 1513 that elected Pope Leo X.

He was administrator of the see of Sarno from 22 June 1513 until 11 February 1517.

In mid-1513, he was opposed to Pope Leo X giving clemency to Cardinals Bernardino López de Carvajal and Federico di Sanseverino.

From 9 September 1513 until his death, he was administrator of the see of Gallipoli. For the second half of 1515, he was also administrator of the see of Lavello.

He opted for the order of cardinal bishops on 16 March 1517, taking the Suburbicarian Diocese of Albano.

In May 1517, he was one of three cardinals who managed the process of two cardinals, Bandinello Sauli and Alfonso Petrucci, accused of plotting against the pope. As president of this tribunal, he sentenced Cardinal Petrucci to death on 16 July 1517. On 4 November 1517 he was one of eight cardinals appointed to a commission to wage war against the Ottoman Empire.

He was the cardinal protector of the Servite Order.

He died in Rome on 5 February 1518. He was buried in the Basilica di Santa Maria Maggiore - he was allegedly buried alive because when his coffin was later opened, his arm was above his head. He was reburied in Santa Maria sopra Minerva.
