= Federico di Sanseverino =

Italian Roman Catholic cardinal

His Eminence Federico di Sanseverino
- Cardinal-Deacon of San Teodoro
- Church: Catholic Church

Personal details
- Born: 1462 Naples, Italy
- Died: 7 August 1516 Rome, Italy

Federico di Sanseverino (died 1516) was an Italian Roman Catholic cardinal of the 16th century. Grandson of the Duke of Urbino, he spent most of his ecclesiastical career as a political operative, first for the Sforza in Milan, and then representing French interests. Most of his colleagues regarded him as a worldly man, more interested in pleasures, hunting and weapons, rather than prayer.

== Biography ==
Federico di Sanseverino was born in Naples in 1462. He was the son of Roberto Sanseverino d'Aragona, a general of the papal army, and his second wife Elisabetta da Montefeltro, natural daughter of the Duke of Urbino Federico da Montefeltro.

Early in his career, he was a cleric in Milan before becoming a protonotary apostolic. On 5 November 1481 he became the apostolic administrator of the see of Maillezais and occupied that post until 1508. Around 1492, he became provost of the church of Santa Maria in Crescenzago. He was the apostolic administrator of the see of Novara from 30 May 1505 until 24 October 1511.

He became a firm and faithful supporter of the Duke of Milan Ludovico Sforza. Thanks to the influence of Sforza, in the consistory of 9 March 1489, Pope Innocent VIII made him a cardinal deacon in pectore. Because of his youth, his creation was not published during the lifetime of Innocent VIII. During the sede vacante following the death of Innocent VIII, Sanseverino went to Rome, escorted by his brother Gaspare and a group of armed men, to demand his admission to the Sacred College and participation in the conclave. Ludovico's brother, Cardinal Ascanio Sforza, convinced the College of Cardinals to publish Sanseverino's creation on 26 July 1492, and he received the deaconry of San Teodoro. Having assumed the title of Cardinal of S. Teodoro, he joined the Curia in the influential party of Ascanio Sforza, intent on averting the election of Giuliano Della Rovere, to the advantage of Rodrigo Borgia (Pope Alexander VI). According to Ludwig Pastor, 'the corruption during the reign of Pope Innocent VIII had increased to such an extent that it became possible by bribery to procure the election of such a successor as Pope Alexander VI Sanseverino's compensation included Rodrigo Borgia's house in Milan.

His ecclesiastical ambitions were compromised, for some time, on the one hand, because relations had become tense between Rome and Milan and, on the other, due to the distrust of the curial circles towards him because of his reputation as a worldly man, dedicated to pleasures, to hunting and weapons, rather than to prayer.

In November 1494, the new pope sent Sanseverino as papal legate to Charles VIII of France in Siena. He returned quickly to Rome, where his loyalty was suspected by the pope. In retaliation for the Franco-Milan alliance, Cardinals Sanseverino and Bernardino Lunati were arrested following the consistory of 10 December 1494, and held in the Apostolic Palace until 19 December 1494. He was then subsequently released to arrange the French king's entrance to Rome on 31 December 1494.

After the conquest of the Kingdom of Naples by the French, Sanseverino re-aligned with Ludovico il Moro and supported an anti-French coalition. In May 1495, he briefly held the position of captain of the Church's men-at-arms. He resumed managing relations between the French court and the Curia and was involved in the work of reconciling the Orsini and Colonna families, with the aim of keeping Alexander VI under pressure.

On 8 February 1496, he became apostolic administrator of the see of Thérouanne, occupying this post until 12 November 1498. On 1 July 1497, he became apostolic administrator of the see of Vienne and held this office until 26 January 1515, when he resigned in favour of his nephew Alessandro.

With a second French incursion into Lombardy, in the summer of 1499, Sanseverino returned north to participate in the defence of the duchy. He became the commendatory abbot of Morimondo Abbey. On that occasion, the not always idyllic relations with the Moro experienced a moment of relaxation and allowed him to take possession of the abbeys of Morimondo and S. Vittore, both in Milan.

At the beginning of September, he followed the defeated duke in his hasty escape towards the imperial lands, but in February 1500, he himself led, with his brother Galeazzo and Cardinal Sforza, the Milanese troops to reconquer Milan. He was then sent by the duke to Maximilian of Habsburg with 40,000 ducats to urge his descent into Italy in defence of the Sforza power. The final collapse of the ducal troops pushed him to remain at the imperial court. However, in September 1500, he opted for a reconciliation with Louis XII.

He participated in the papal conclave of September 1503 that elected Pope Pius III. He also participated in the papal conclave of October 1503 that elected Pope Julius II.

On 24 May 1504, Pope Julius II named him papal legate to the Patrimonium Sancti Petri. He became apostolic administrator of the see of Novara on 30 May 1505. On 1 May 1510 he opted for the deaconry of Sant'Angelo in Pescheria, while continuing to hold the deaconry of San Teodoro in commendam.

There was friction with Julius II over the possession of the Abbey of Chiaravalle, which the king had assigned to him, and his loyalty to France when the pope was reconciled with Venice in February 1510. After the pope threatened to imprison Sanseverino in the Castel Sant'Angelo in June 1510, the cardinal joined the pope's enemies. In October 1510, he sought refuge, with another four cardinals, in the camp of the French army and went to Milan. There, on 16 May 1511, he was one of the signatories of a document calling a council in Pisa for 1 September 1511. He did not attend this council after the pope threatened him with excommunication. He participated with the French forces at the Battle of Ravenna (1512); Louis XII of France planned to make Cardinal Sanseverino governor of the Papal States after deposing the pope, but this never came to pass. The choice to support the French resulted in his excommunication and dismissal as cardinal by Julius II in January 1512, who redistributed his numerous benefits to other prelates.

Following the death of Pope Julius II, Cardinal Sanseverino did not participate in the papal conclave of 1513 that elected Pope Leo X. Shortly thereafter, the cardinal was arrested in Florence on the pope's orders, with a promise he would be released if he repented. On 17 June 1513 he denounced the schismatical council of Pisa and submitted to the pope's authority in a letter later read at a session of the Fifth Council of the Lateran. He and Cardinal Bernardino López de Carvajal arrived in Rome on 27 June 1513 and personally repented in a secret consistory held in Rome. He was absolved by the pope, ordered to fast for a month, and restored to the College of Cardinals.

From June 1513, he was the cardinal protodeacon. Shortly later, he was named cardinal protector of the Kingdom of France. On 25 June 1515, he was arrested on the pope's orders because it looked like one of his servants had killed a papal guard, but he proved his innocence the next day. In November 1515, he was sent as a papal legate to Francis I of France, who met him outside the gates of Bologna.

He died in Rome on 7 August 1516. He is buried in Santa Maria in Aracoeli.

Catholic Church titles
Preceded by Jean d'Amboise	Administrator of Maillezais; 1481–1508	Succeeded by Pietro de Accolti de Aretio
Preceded by Teodoro Paleologo di Montferrato	Cardinal-Deacon of San Teodoro (1st term); 1492–1511	Succeeded by Alfonso Petrucci
Preceded by Antoine de Croy	Administrator of Thérouanne; 1496–1498	Succeeded by Philippe de Luxembourg
Preceded by Antoine de Clermont	Administrator of Vienne; 1497–1515	Succeeded by Alessandro Sanseverino
Preceded by Girolamo Pallavicini	Apostolic Administrator of Novara; 1505–1511	Succeeded by Matthäus Schiner
Preceded by Giuliano Cesarini (iuniore)	Cardinal-Deacon of Sant'Angelo in Pescheria; 1510–1514	Succeeded by Matthäus Lang von Wellenburg
Preceded by Alfonso Petrucci	Cardinal-Deacon of San Teodoro (2nd term); 1514–1516	Succeeded by Francesco Pisani
