= Jaime de Casanova =

Jaime de Casanova (died 1504) (called Cardinal Casanova) was a Spanish Roman Catholic cardinal.

== Biography ==
Jaime de Casanova was born in Xàtiva, ca. 1435.

Early in his career, Casanova came under the protection of Cardinal Roderic Llançol i de Borja (the future Pope Alexander VI). In Rome, he became abbreviatore di parco minore; then a papal notary; and then a protonotary apostolic. In 1492, he was a witness at the dissolution of the marriage of Lucrezia Borgia and Gaspare Aversa, and in 1493, was a witness at her marriage to Giovanni Sforza. In 1497, he became an officiali audientie contradictarum, and in 1498 a papal chamberlain.

Pope Alexander VI made him a cardinal priest in the consistory of 31 May 1503. He received the titular church of Santo Stefano Rotondo on 12 June 1503.

In August 1503, he was present at the Papal Mass performed for the dying pope. The pope died on 18 August 1503; the next day his son Cesare Borgia sent Michelotto Corella and a band of thugs to the Papal Apartments, where they pulled a knife on Cardinal Casanova and demanded he give them all the money in the apartments. Terrified, Cardinal Casanova handed over the keys.

He participated in the papal conclave of September 1503, though his participation was limited by bad health. He participated in the consecration of Pope Pius III, but not his coronation. He then participated in the papal conclave of October 1503 that elected Pope Julius II. He was able to attend the new pope's coronation, but not his first consistory and meeting of the College of Cardinals. His health recovered a little in spring 1504.

He died in Rome on 4 June 1504. He is buried in Santa Maria del Popolo.
