= 1503 papal conclave =

1503 papal conclave may refer to:

- September 1503 papal conclave, which elected Pius III to succeed Alexander VI
- October 1503 papal conclave, which elected Julius II to succeed Pius III
