= Bernardino Lunati =

Italian Roman Catholic cardinal

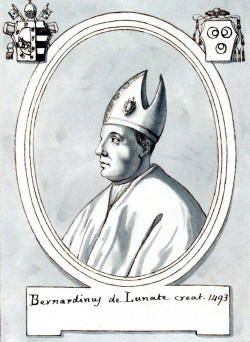
Bernardino Lunati

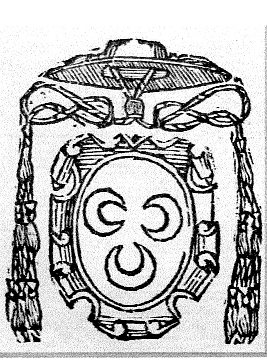
Coat of arms of Cardinal Bernardino Lunati

Bernardino Lunati (1452–1497) was an Italian Roman Catholic cardinal. His entire ecclesiastical career was due to his patron, Cardinal Ascanio Sforza, whom he served first as secretary, then as chancellor. As cardinal, he aided Sforza in his political maneuvers. Sforza was either unable or unwilling to obtain for his protege any munificent benefices and Lunati remained dependent on him.

== Biography ==
Bernardino Lunati was born in Pavia in 1452 to Filippina Beccaria and Antonio, miles auratus, an important leader of the Visconti army who supported the succession of Francesco I Sforza in the Duchy of Milan.

He obtained the patronage of Ascanio Sforza, and was involved in diplomatic missions on his behalf. In November 1483 Lunati was sent to Rome to supervise the negotiations for Sforza's appointment to cardinal. Having obtained the important dignity on 14 March 1484, the following August Cardinal Sforza moved to Rome to participate in the conclave which was to elect the successor of Pope Sixtus IV and brought Lunati with him as his own conclavist.

Having settled in the Roman residence of Cardinal Sforza, Lunati carried out the functions of chancellor there, signing the letters that the latter dictated to him. When necessary, he was employed in private diplomatic missions: in the spring-summer of 1486 he was sent to Naples to work for the cessation of the barons' war; in July 1487 he was sent to Milan to evaluate the possibilities that his master had of being appointed regent of the Duchy in the event of the death of Ludovico il Moro. Joined by Ascanio in November, Lunati remained with him for almost a year.

Returning to Rome in the autumn of 1488 together with Ascanio, Lunati became his very active during the negotiations that led to the creation of the thirteen-year-old Giovanni de' Medici (future Pope Leo X) as cardinal. To this success Sforza added another when at the conclave of 1492, he managed to have Rodrigo Borgia elected as Pope Alexander VI. Lunati served as Sforza's conclavist on this occasion as well. Sforza was reportedly handsomely bribed and received the office of Vice-Chancellor.

Called to live in the apostolic palace alongside his master, Lunati was invested with the title of apostolic prothonotary and was able to act as an intercessor for obtaining bulls and briefs apostolic of ordinary content.

Sforza lobbied for Lunati to be made a cardinal, and Pope Alexander VI complied at the consistory of 20 September 1493. Lunati was made cardinal deacon of San Ciriaco alle Terme Diocleziane on 23 September 1493. Immediately after, he was raised to the cardinalate, Lunati was ordained as a priest. Lunati remained a "poor cardinal" dependent on Ascanio's continued economic support. His benefices were always very poor and never included a bishopric.

Coming into conflict with Alexander VI during the preliminary phases of the arrival of Charles VIII of France, Sforza established contacts with the anti-papal front and in the spring of 1494 sent Lunati to Milan in order to ascertain through him the possibilities of calling a Gallican council with which to put the pontiff on trial. Having returned to Rome, Lunati was busy, between the summer and the following autumn, ensuring diplomatic cover for the anti-papal moves that his master, who had fled the city for fear of retaliation, was plotting clandestinely.

In retaliation for the Franco-Milan alliance Cardinals Sforza, Sanseverino, and Lunati were arrested following the consistory of 10 December 1494, and held in the Apostolic Palace until 19 December 1494. Freed by order of Alexander VI (who thought of using him to order the surrender of the pro-French rebels), Lunati took advantage of the opportunity to disappear and go strengthen the ranks of the anti-papal revolt. On December 31. 1494 Charles VIII entered Rome, with Lunati and other cardinals in his retinue. Following the agreement reached between the pope and the king on January 15, 1495, Cardinal Lunati traveled with Cardinal Sforza to Milan, returning to Rome with him on 21 February 1495. He accompanied the pope to Orvieto on 27 May 1495 and returned with him to Rome on 27 June.

On January 16, 1495, together with Ascanio, he fled from a Rome occupied by the troops of Charles VIII, suddenly become an enemy of the Milanese. On 27 May they were among the cardinals who, alongside the pope, abandoned Rome for Orvieto. In the autumn of the same year, in view of the anti-French revolt promoted by Ascanio, Lunati was sent to the Kingdom of Naples to support the Aragonese war of reconquest. On 10 July 1495 he was named apostolic administrator of the see of Aquino, holding this post until 13 November 1495.

Alexander VI intended to confiscate Bracciano from the Orsini, and give it to his son, Giovanni Borgia, 2nd Duke of Gandía. The great difficulties it entailed from a military point of view were underestimated. In the consistory of 26 October 1496 Lunati was named papal legate to Guidobaldo da Montefeltro, Duke of Urbino, captain general of the papal troops, in the war against the Orsini family. He was with the duke for the occupation of Anguillara Sabazia, Galera, Bassano, Sutri, Campagnano di Roma, Formello, Sacrofano, and Cesena.

With the Papal troops routed in January 1497 by an Orsini counter-offensive, Lunati returned to Rome, where he died of fever on 8 August 1497. Lunati had a natural son, Alessandro, in Pavia. Ascanio worked to get his father's benefice of San Savino in Piacenza transferred to the son, who went on to have an ecclesiastical career. Lunati is buried in Santa Maria del Popolo. The monument was financed by Ascanio Sforza.
