= Pietro Isvalies =

Italian Roman Catholic bishop and cardinal

Pietro Isvalies (died 1511) (called the Cardinal of Oristano) was an Italian Roman Catholic bishop and cardinal.

== Biography ==
Pietro Isvalies was born in Messina, part of an obscure family of Spanish origin.

Early in his career, he became a canon of the cathedral chapter of the Cathedral of Messina. He later became vicar general of the metropolitan see of Messina. He later moved to Rome, becoming a protonotary apostolic. He was the governor of Rome from 11 August 1496 until September 1500.

On 18 February 1497 he was elected Archbishop of Reggio Calabria. He was consecrated as a bishop in the Sistine Chapel on 4 June 1497 by Bartolomé Flores, Archbishop of Cosenza, secretary to the pope. He occupied this post until 24 July 1506, when he resigned in favor of his nephew Francesco.

At the request of Ferdinand II of Aragon, Pope Alexander VI made Isvalies a cardinal priest in the consistory of 28 September 1500. He received the red hat on 2 October 1500 and the titular church of San Ciriaco alle Terme Diocleziane on 5 October 1500.

On 5 October 1500 he was made legate a latere to the Kingdom of Hungary and the Kingdom of Poland; he left for the legation on 19 November 1500.

On 21 June 1503 he became the apostolic administrator of the see of Veszprém, occupying this post until his death.

He did not participate in the papal conclave of September 1503 that elected Pope Pius III. He did participate in the papal conclave of October 1503 that elected Pope Julius II.

He opted for the titular church of Santa Pudenziana on 18 August 1507, though he retained the titulus of San Ciriaco alle Terme Diocleziane in commendam until his death. He was the administrator of the see of Ourense from 7 June 1508 until his death. He was the cardinal protector of the Kingdom of Poland from 1 May 1510. He was the administrator of the see of Messina from 1510 until his death.

In January 1511, he accompanied the pope to the siege of Mirandola. In Ravenna on 24 May 1511, the pope made him legate a latere to Bologna and Romagna. He was archpriest of the Basilica di Santa Maria Maggiore.

He died in Cesena on 22 September 1511. He is buried in the Basilica di Santa Maria Maggiore.
