= Amanieu d'Albret =

French Roman Catholic cardinal

Amanieu d'Albret (1478 – 1520) was a French Roman Catholic cardinal.

== Life ==
Amanieu d'Albret was born in the Kingdom of France ca. 1478, the son of Alain I of Albret, and Frances, Countess of Périgord. His older brother Jean married Catherine of Navarre. His uncle Louis d'Albret was also a cardinal. He had three illegitimate children, one son and two daughters.

Early in his career, he became a protonotary apostolic He was also Archimandrite of San Rufo. On 19 July 1499 he became apostolic administrator of the see of Comminges but on 1 January 1502 the cathedral chapter of Saint-Bertrand-de-Comminges Cathedral chose another candidate as bishop.

== Cardinal ==
Amanieu was made a cardinal deacon in the consistory of 20 March 1500 by Pope Alexander VI. The pope sent him the red hat on 2 October 1500 and he received the deaconry of San Nicola in Carcere on 5 October 1500.

From 4 May to 10 October 1500, Amanieu was administrator of the see of Oloron. He was administrator of the see of Pamiers from 14 March 1502 until 1506. After Cardinal Giuliano della Rovere sought refuge in Savona, Amanieu was secretly despatched on 21 June 1502 to bring him back, but failed in this mission.

Amanieu participated in both the papal conclave of September 1503 that elected Pope Pius III, and the papal conclave of October 1503 that elected Pope Julius II. After this second conclave he had to leave Rome.

Amanieu was administrator of the see of Vannes from 8 January to 14 October 1504; of the see of Bazas from 4 December 1504 until his death; of the see of Lescar from 6 October 1507 until 20 June 1515; and of the see of Pamplona from 13 May 1510 until 1512, and again from 1517 until his death.

Amanieu participated in the plot of cardinals against Pope Julius II. In 1511, he attended the schismatic Council of Pisa even after the pope threatened him with excommunication. (Note: According to Jennifer Britnell and Christine Shaw, Amanieu was forced by Louis XII to attend the Council in Pisa) There, he was a strong supporter of the French party. After the death of Julius II, he did not participate in the papal conclave of 1513 that elected Pope Leo X. The new pope absolved Cardinal d'Albret (along with Cardinals Guillaume Briçonnet and René de Prie) and confirmed him in his offices. He also served as administrator of the see of Pamiers from 1514 until his death. He became the cardinal protodeacon on 3 September 1520.

He died in Casteljaloux on 20 December 1520. He is buried in Casteljaloux.

== Sources ==
- Albret (2018). "ALBRET, Amanieu d' (ca. 1478-1520)". Biographical Dictionary of the Cardinals of the Holy Roman Church.
- Bardati, Flaminia (2010). "Between the king and the pope: French cardinals in Rome (1495-1560)". Urban History. 37 (3, Special Issue: Locating communities in the early mdern Italian city (December)): 419–433.
- Britnell, Jennifer; Shaw, Christine (2000). "A French Life of Pope Julius II, 1519: Jean Beaufils and his Translation of Platina". Bibliothèque d'Humanisme et Renaissance. 62 (1): 103–118.
- Duboscq, Guy (1938). "Amanieu, cardinal d'Albret et les évêchés du sud-ouest de la France d'après un compte du début du XVIe siècle". Annales du Midi (in French). 50–198: 200–207.
- Setton, Kenneth M. (1984). The Papacy and the Levant (1204-1571). Vol. III: The Sixteenth Century to the Reign of Julius III. The American Philosophical Society.
