= Gerolamo Pallavicini =

Roman Catholic prelate (died 1503)

Most Reverend Gerolamo Pallavicini
- Bishop of Novara
- Church: Catholic Church
- Diocese: Roman Catholic Diocese of Novara
- In office: 1485–1503
- Predecessor: Ascanio Maria Sforza
- Successor: Federico di Sanseverino

Personal details
- Died: 18 August 1503 Novara, Italy

Gerolamo Pallavicini (died 1503) was a Roman Catholic prelate who served as Bishop of Novara (1485–1503).

== Biography ==
On 18 April 1485, Gerolamo Pallavicini was appointed during the papacy of Pope Innocent VIII as Bishop of Novara. He served as Bishop of Novara until his death on 18 August 1503. While bishop, he was the principal co-consecrator of Nikolaus Schinner, Bishop of Sion (1498).

== External links and additional sources ==
- Cheney, David M. "Diocese of Novara". Catholic-Hierarchy.org. (for Chronology of Bishops) ^{[self-published]}
- Chow, Gabriel. "Diocese of Novara (Italy)". GCatholic.org. (for Chronology of Bishops) ^{[self-published]}

Catholic Church titles
Preceded by Ascanio Maria Sforza	Bishop of Novara; 1485–1503	Succeeded by Federico di Sanseverino
