= Florentius de Faxolis =

Italian priest and music theorist

Florentius de Faxolis, in Italian Fiorenzo de' Fasoli (c. 1461 – 18 March 1496), was an Italian priest and music theorist.

Florentius entered the pay of Cardinal Ascanio Sforza in 1481–1482, while the cardinal was living in Rome and Naples. His rise after this was rapid. In 1482, he obtained a canonry in the collegiate church of San Fiorenzo in Fiorenzuola d'Arda. In 1483, he was appointed chaplain of Santa Maria della Stella in Milan. In 1484, he received a papal dispensation allowing him to become a priest before the canonical age.

At the cardinal's behest, Florentius wrote a treatise in Latin on music theory, the Liber musices (Book of Music), between 1485 and 1492. It is preserved in a single manuscript—now in Milan, Biblioteca Trivulziana, 2146—illuminated by Attavante degli Attavanti or his atelier. It contains 95 folios and is divided into three books. The only contemporary theorist cited by Florentius is Blasius Romero. The work closes with a poem by Francesco Tranchedino.

== Editions ==
- Book on Music, ed. Bonnie J. Blackburn and Leofranc Holford-Strevens (Harvard University Press, 2010).
- Un manuale di musica per Ascanio Sforza: il Liber Musices di Florentius (Ms. 2146 della Biblioteca Trivulziana di Milano), ed. Francesco Rocco Rossi (PhD diss., University of Pavia, 2007), vols. 1 and 2.
