= Conclavist =

Personal aide to a cardinal during a papal conclave

A conclavist was a personal aide of a cardinal present in a papal conclave. The term is sometimes used to refer to all present with a conclave, including the cardinal-electors, but is more properly applied only to the non-cardinals. Conclavists played an important historical role in the negotiations of papal elections and in the evolution of secrecy (or the lack thereof), writing many of the extant accounts of papal elections.

Three popes have been elected from former conclavists, including Pope Pius VI (a conclavist in the 1740 conclave). Other conclavists have later been elevated to the cardinalate, such as Pierre Guérin de Tencin (1721), Niccolò Coscia (1724), Christoph Anton Migazzi (1740), and Carlo Confalonieri (1922).

Pope Paul VI in effect eliminated the role of the historical conclavist by banning private aides and creating a common support staff.

== Background ==
The participation of the laity in the election of a pope predates the creation of the papal conclave, with different degrees of involvement characterizing papal selection before 1059. The concept of papal elections as an exclusive event dates to the use of the Basilica of St. John Lateran, which was too small to accommodate "the whole people", as the site of papal elections during the Byzantine Papacy (537–752). The modern conception of the papal election as the exclusive provenance of the College of Cardinals dates to Pope Nicholas II's 1059 bull In Nomine Domini, which limited suffrage to the cardinal-bishops.

The word conclavist comes from conclave (derived from the Latin cum clave, meaning "with a key"), which evolved during the thirteenth century, being formalized by Pope Gregory X's Ubi periculum in 1274, promulgated during the Second Council of Lyon. The procedure of locking in the papal elections was intermittently used until, and exclusively used after, 1294. The norms on the number and type of individuals that could accompany them varied from conclave to conclave until the mid fifteenth century, when the role of the conclavist "had become defined".

== History ==
=== From the 15th century ===
From the mid-fifteenth century, cardinals were permitted only one conclavist each, usually a servant. This man servant served as a secretary and confidant to his cardinal master, and an intermediary between the cardinals. Many cardinals preferred to delegate the negotiation of "promises of favors" to their conclavist, which "played so major a role in papal elections for the next three centuries". Clandestine meetings between conclavists were often influential on the outcome of the conclave. According to Baumgartner, "talented conclavists could achieve a great deal for their masters, but because so much of what they did was behind the scenes, it is difficult to assess accurately their place in the elections, although many conclavists wrote diaries and memoirs detailing the events of the conclaves and their roles".

The allowable number of conclavists was increased by two by the time of the 1484 conclave and these were housed above the cells of the cardinal electors, all of whom could be housed in the same chapel due to their small number. Limitations on the number of conclavists were often viewed as only a suggestion: during the conclave of 1549–50, when cardinals were limited to two conclavists, some had three or more, and one snapshot of the occupants of the conclave suggests an average of seven conclavists per cardinal. Attempts to reduce the total number of people in the conclave—including many ambassadors and foreign agents—proved unsuccessful. The number of the conclavists ensured that the various bookmakers of Rome were well-informed, streamlining the practice of gambling on papal elections.

Conclavists were compensated for the inconvenience of being locked in the conclave by the ransacking of the furnishings of the cell of the newly elected pope and by the expectation of money and benefices.

=== From Pius IV ===
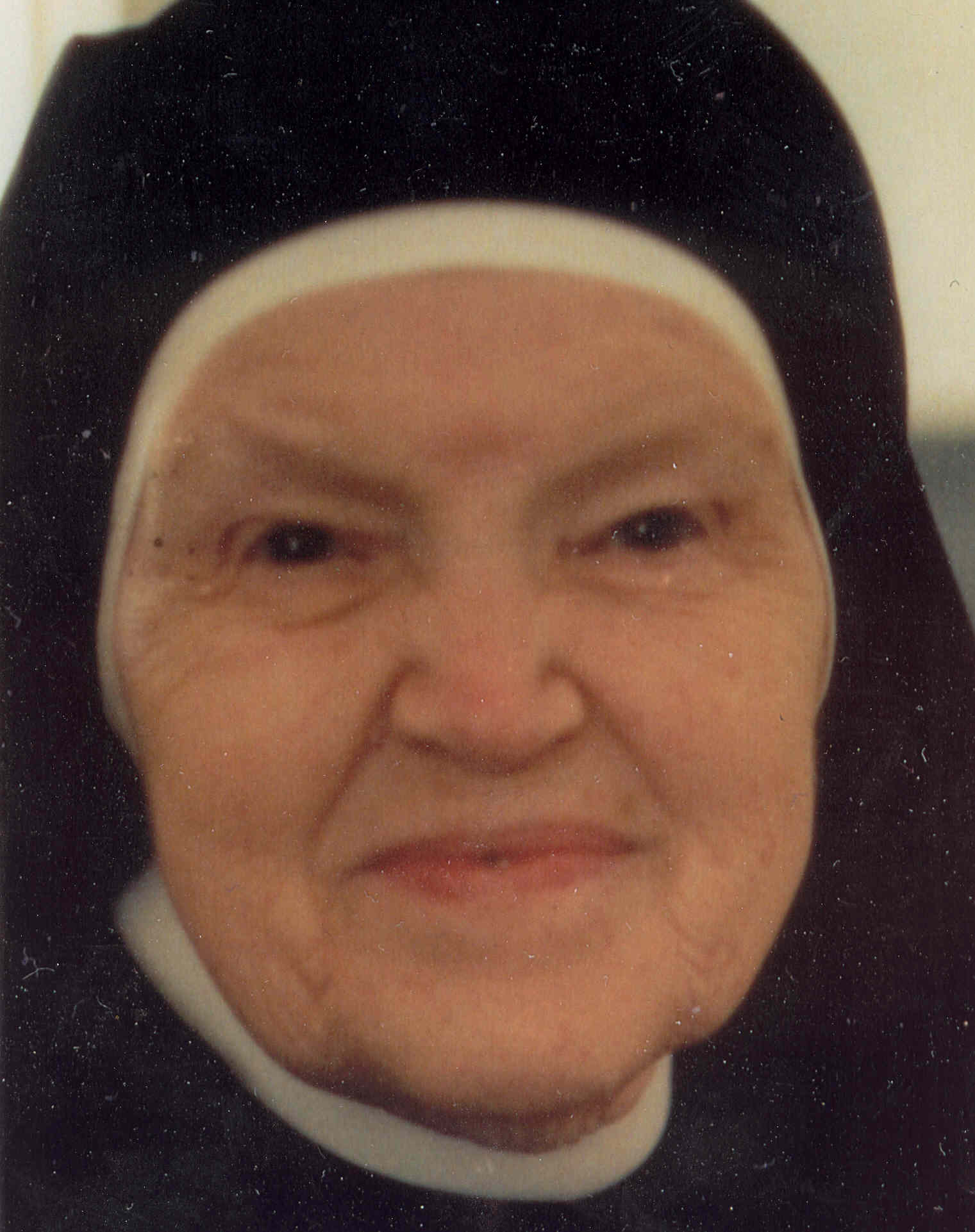
Pascalina Lehnert, one of the few women in history permitted to serve as a conclavist.

A frequent choice of conclavist was the brother or nephew of the cardinal elector, until Pope Pius IV (1559–1565) banned this practice. Pius IV issued an apostolic constitution on the subject of conclavists; he limited cardinals to two conclavists, except for princes and the most senior cardinals, whom he permitted three. In addition to the restriction on relatives, Pius IV required that the conclavist have been in the service of the cardinal for at least one year prior to the conclave. He also decreed that the conclavists collectively be paid 10,000 crowns from the papal treasury and 2,000 more from vacant benefices. He banned the practice of sacking the cell of the elected pope, but the practice continued nonetheless.

A document from the seventeenth century entitled "Advice for the Conclavist" describes the duties and rewards of the practice: conclavists were expected to care for the physical needs of the cardinal elector (e.g. making his bed and warming his food), gather information, spread disinformation, carry a heavy purse for distributing funds to minor conclave servants in exchange for information, possess wine and food in his cell for entertaining, and carry disguises for himself and his boss so they could move from cell to cell unrecognized.

The erudite abbot Felice Gualterio, of the noble family from Orvieto and younger brother of the conclavist Sebastiano Gualterio, in his treatise "The Conclavist" underscores that sentiment: "I wish my conclavist would transform himself, if it were possible, into the nature of a chameleon, as this animal takes on the quality of the colours of all things which he comes near to and so, speaking and dealing with humans, he would be able to satisfy everyone's nature".

Unlike a cardinal, who—in the case of illness, certified under oath by a physician—may leave a conclave, a conclavist cannot. In 1621, forty conclavists died during the conclave (along with eight cardinals) due to a bout of malaria. Two conclavists were forcibly ejected from the 1829 conclave on March 15 for being agents of Austria. During the papal conclave, 1878 (the first in the Vatican since 1775) a common kitchen was used from meals and cardinals were barred from receiving food from the outside; as this reduced the chances for communicating with the outside world during meals, the cardinals began objecting to eating with the conclavists and staff and were given a separate table.

Throughout history, conclavists have almost exclusively been men; however, during the conclave of 1939, Cardinal Pacelli (who was elected Pope Pius XII) was allowed to bring several German nuns, including Pascalina Lehnert, into "Cell No. 13" as his conclavists.

Anecdotal accounts have often blamed conclavists for the breach of secrecy in papal elections. For example, after the 1903 conclave, before the election of Giuseppe Sarto as Pope Pius X was announced, several conclavists apparently attempted to signal his election from the window by "imitating the sewing motions of a tailor, sarto in Italian". The papal conclave, 1963 was the first swept for listening devices, and there are contradictory accounts of a conclavist using a small radio to alert the CIA (or, alternatively, the Vatican Radio) of the results of the election before flushing the device down the toilet.

=== From Paul VI ===
Pope Paul VI (1963–1978) reformed the rules of the conclave in an attempt to enforce secrecy; he replaced the allowance of two conclavists per cardinal with a set of common secretaries and servants. Paul VI's reforms in effect eliminated the conclavists, increasing the space available for the rapidly expanding size of the College of Cardinals (the common secretaries and servants numbered about seventy in the two 1978 papal conclaves). Since the reign of Paul VI, the only non-cardinals present in conclave after the pronunciation of Extra omnes ("everyone out") by the master of papal liturgical celebrations are the master himself and the priest chosen to give a homily on the subject of electing the pope, and even they depart after the homily. Under the constitution promulgated by Pope John Paul II, the Congregation of Cardinals may confirm a nurse to assist a cardinal in ill-health, even during the period of election.

== Other notable conclavists ==
The following conclavists have written notable historical accounts of conclaves:

- Pietro Paolo Gualtieri of Arezzo, conclavist to Bernardino Maffei during the conclave of 1549–1550
- Sebastiano Gualterio, bishop of Viterbo, of the noble family from Orvieto (also spelled "Gualtieri", but not related to Pietro Paolo Gualtieri), conclavist to Alessandro Farnese during the conclave of 1549–1550
- Angelo Massarelli, conclavist to Cardinal Cervini during the conclave of 1549–1550
- Antonio Maria di Savoia di Collegno, conclavist to Cristoforo Madruzzo during the conclave of 1549–1550
- Pedro de Toledo, conclavist and brother to Juan Álvarez de Toledo during the conclave of 1549–1550
