= 1978 papal conclave =

1978 conclave may refer to:

- August 1978 conclave, which elected John Paul I to succeed Paul VI
- October 1978 conclave, which elected John Paul II to succeed John Paul I
