= 1492 conclave =

Election of Catholic Pope Alexander VI

Papal conclave August 1492

Dates and location
- 6–11 August 1492; Sistine Chapel, Apostolic Palace, Papal States

Key officials
- Dean: Roderic de Borja
- Sub-dean: Oliviero Carafa
- Camerlengo: Raffaele Riario
- Protopriest: Luis Juan del Mila y Borja; Girolamo Basso della Rovere
- Protodeacon: Francesco Piccolomini

Election
- Ballots: 4

Elected pope
- Roderic de Borja; Name taken: Alexander VI
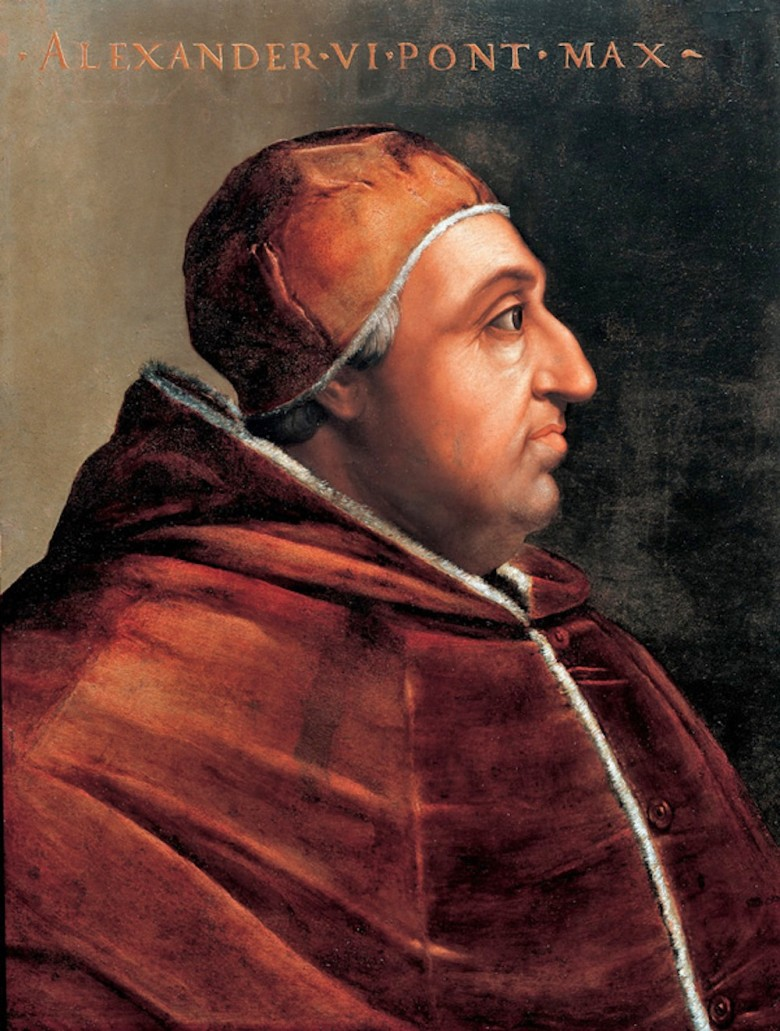

A papal conclave was held from 6 to 11 August 1492 to elect a new pope to succeed Innocent VIII, who had died on 25 July 1492. Of the 27 members of the College of Cardinals, all but four attended. (Note: The current 80-year-old age limit for cardinal electors was introduced by Pope Paul VI in 1970.) On the fourth ballot, the conclave elected Cardinal Rodrigo Borja, the vice chancellor of the Roman Catholic Church. After accepting his election, he took the name Pope Alexander VI.

The event was the first papal conclave to be held in the Sistine Chapel. Cardinal Rodrigo Borja was elected unanimously on the fourth ballot. The election is notorious for allegations that Borja bought the votes of his electors, promising them lucrative appointments and other material gifts. Concerns about this conclave were among the reasons that Pope Julius II—who was at the time of the election one of the foremost candidates and participants, as Cardinal Giuliano della Rovere—enacted stronger rules against simony in 1503, shortly after Alexander VI's death in the same year. In the 1492 conclave, Charles VIII of France reportedly bankrolled 200,000 ducats (plus 100,000 ducats from the Doge of Genoa) for the election of Giuliano della Rovere.

== Cardinal electors ==
Of the 23 cardinals participating in the conclave, fourteen had been elevated by Pope Sixtus IV. The cardinals of Sixtus IV, known as the "Sistine Cardinals" and led by Giuliano della Rovere, had controlled the conclave of 1484, electing one of their own, Giambattista Cibo as Pope Innocent VIII. Since 1431 the composition of the College of Cardinals had been radically transformed, increasing the number of cardinal-nephews (from 3 to 10), crown-cardinals (from 2 to 8), and representatives of powerful Roman noble families (from 2 to 4). With the exception of three curial officials and one pastor, the cardinals were "secularly-minded princes largely unconcerned with the spiritual life of either the Latin church or its members."

At the time of Innocent VIII's death, the names of Cardinals Gherardo and Sanseverino (both created in pectore), had not been published, thus making them ineligible to participate in the conclave; however, both were published as an act of the College in sede vacante, Gherardo having been pushed by Giovanni Battista Orsini and Sanseverino by Ascanio Sforza. Gherardo was assigned the title of Santi Nereo e Achilleo, which it was believed Innocent VIII had intended for him; Sanseverino was given the poor and undesirable diaconate of San Teodoro to ensure that the future pontiff would confirm his assignment.

According to the account of bishop ambassador Giovanni Andrea Boccaccio, at least seven cardinals considered themselves papabile, having dismantled the furnishings of their palaces as a precaution against the traditional pillaging of the pope-elect's residence by the Roman populace: da Costa, di Campofregoso, Michiel, Piccolomini, Domenico della Rovere, Savelli, and Zeno.

Elector	Nationality	Order and title	Elevated	Elevator	Notes
Rodrigo Borja	Kingdom of Valencia	Cardinal-Bishop of Porto e Santa Rufina	20 February 1456 created in pectore; published 17 September 1456	Callixtus III	Vice-Chancellor of the Holy Roman Church, Administrator of Valencia elected Pope Alexander VI; Cardinal-nephew, House of Borgia
Oliviero Carafa	Neapolitan	Cardinal-Bishop of Sabina	18 September 1467	Paul II	Vice Dean of the College of Cardinals; Crown cardinal of Ferdinand I of Naples
Giuliano della Rovere	Savona	Cardinal-Bishop of Ostia and Velletri	16 December 1471 created in pectore; published 22 December 1471	Sixtus IV	Dean of the College of Cardinals, Cardinal-nephew, bishop of Bologna, administrator of Avignon; Future Pope Julius II
Giovanni Battista Zeno	Venetian	Cardinal-Bishop of Frascati	21 November 1468	Paul II	Cardinal-nephew
Giovanni Michiel	Venetian	Cardinal-Bishop of Palestrina	21 November 1468	Paul II	Cardinal-nephew
Jorge da Costa	Portuguese	Cardinal-Bishop of Albano	16 December 1476	Sixtus IV	Archbishop of Lisbon; Crown cardinal of Afonso V of Portugal
Girolamo Basso della Rovere	Savona	Cardinal-Priest of S. Crisogono	10 December 1477 created in pectore; published 12 December 1477	Sixtus IV	Cardinal-nephew; bishop of Recanati e Macerata
Domenico della Rovere	Piedmont	Cardinal-Priest of S. Clemente	10 February 1478	Sixtus IV	Cardinal-nephew; archbishop of Turin
Paolo di Campofregoso	Genoese	Cardinal-Priest of S. Sisto	15 May 1480	Sixtus IV	Former ruler of Genoa; archbishop of Genoa
Giovanni Conti	Roman	Cardinal-Priest of S. Vitale	15 November 1483	Sixtus IV	
Giovanni Giacomo Sclafenati	Milanese	Cardinal-Priest of S. Cecilia	15 November 1483	Sixtus IV	Bishop of Parma
Lorenzo Cibò di Mari	Genoese	Cardinal-Priest of S. Marco	9 March 1489	Innocent VIII	Cardinal-nephew; archbishop of Benevento
Ardicino della Porta	Milanese (Novara)	Cardinal-Priest of Ss. Giovanni e Paolo	9 March 1489	Innocent VIII	Bishop of Aleria
Antoniotto Pallavicini	Genoese	Cardinal-Priest of S. Prassede	9 March 1489	Innocent VIII	Bishop of Orense
Maffeo Gherardo, O.S.B.Cam.	Venetian	Cardinal-Priest of Ss. Nereo e Achilleo	9 March 1489 (created in pectore)	Innocent VIII	Not published before death of Innocent VIII; patriarch of Venice
Francesco Piccolomini	Sienese	Cardinal-Deacon of S. Eustachio	5 March 1460	Pius II	Protodeacon, bishop of Siena, future Pope Pius III, Cardinal-nephew
Raffaele Riario	Savona	Cardinal-Deacon of S. Lorenzo in Damaso	12 December 1477	Sixtus IV	Camerlengo of the Holy Roman Church, Cardinal-nephew
Giovanni Battista Savelli	Roman	Cardinal-Deacon of S. Nicola in Carcere Tulliano	15 May 1480	Sixtus IV	Former Governor of Bologna
Giovanni Colonna	Roman	Cardinal-Deacon of S. Maria in Aquiro	15 May 1480	Sixtus IV	
Giambattista Orsini	Roman	Cardinal-Deacon of S. Maria Nuova	15 November 1483	Sixtus IV	
Ascanio Sforza	Milanese	Cardinal-Deacon of Ss. Vito e Modesto	6 March 1484 created in pectore; published 17 March 1484	Sixtus IV	House of Sforza, ruling family member of Milan
Giovanni de' Medici	Florentine	Cardinal-Deacon of S. Maria in Domnica	9 March 1489	Innocent VIII	Future Pope Leo X, member of the ruling family of Florence
Federico Sanseverino	Neapolitan	Cardinal-Deacon of S. Teodoro	9 March 1489 (created in pectore)	Innocent VIII	Not published before death of Innocent VIII

=== Absent cardinals ===
There is no evidence that the 4 absent cardinals made an attempt to reach Rome for the conclave.

Elector	Nationality	Order and title	Elevated	Elevator	Notes
Luis Juan del Mila y Borja	Catalan	Cardinal-Priest of Ss. IV Coronati	20 February 1456 created in pectore; published 17 September 1456	Callixtus III	Archpriest of the Sacred College; bishop of Lérida; de facto retired Cardinal-nephew
Pedro González de Mendoza	Castilian	Cardinal-Priest of S. Croce in Gerusalemme	7 May 1473	Sixtus IV	Archbishop of Toledo; Had not left Iberian Peninsula since elevation Crown cardinal of the Catholic Monarchs
André d'Espinay	French	Cardinal-Priest of Ss. Silvestro e Martino ai Monti	9 March 1489	Innocent VIII	Archbishop of Bordeaux, and Lyon; Crown cardinal of Charles VIII of France
Pierre d'Aubusson	French	Cardinal-Deacon of S. Adriano	9 March 1489	Innocent VIII	Grand Master of Knights Hospitaller; Busy defending Rhodes from the Turks

== Procedures ==
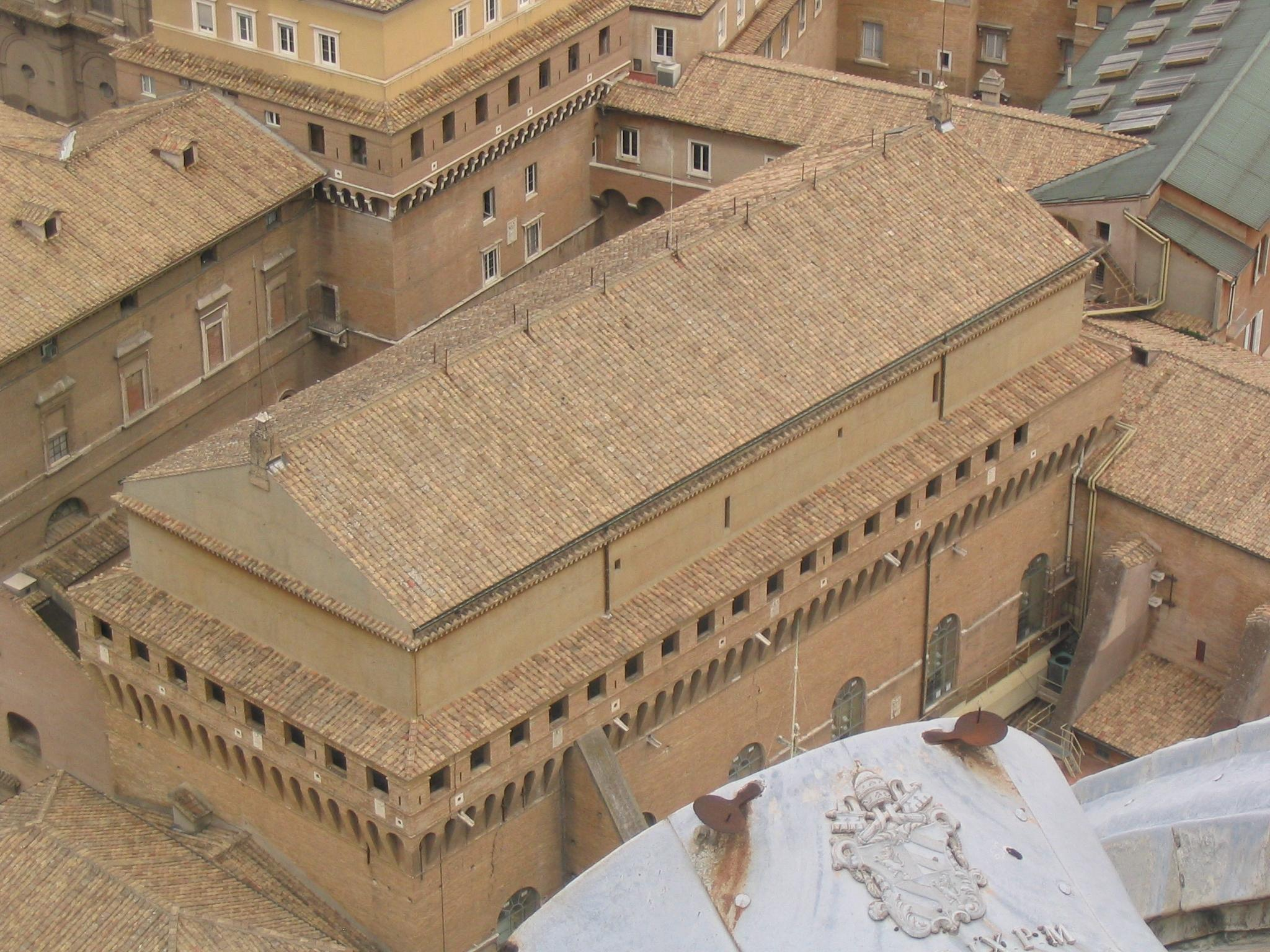
The conclave was the first held in the Sistine Chapel

As dictated by the prescriptions Ubi periculum and Ne Romani, the conclave should have begun on 4 August, ten days after the death of Innocent VIII; however, the conclave was delayed to await the slow arrival of the aged Gherardo, bearing a letter from Venice's Council of Ten urging his acceptance into the College. The cardinals had decided as early as their first meeting on 24 July to use the Sistine Chapel for the balloting and assembly of the conclave.

Johann Burchard, the German papal master of ceremonies, who presided over the conclave, as well as the previous one in 1484, kept an extensive diary, noting that each cardinal was provided:

A table, a chair, a stool. A seat for the dischargement of the stomach. Two urinals, two small napkins for the table of the lord. Twelve little napkins for the same lord and four hand towels. Two little cloths for wiping cups. Carpet. A chest or box for the garments of the lord, his shirts, rochets, towels for wiping the face and a handkerchief. Four boxes of sweets for provisions. One vessel of sugared pine-seeds. Marzipan. Cane sugar. Biscuits. A lump of sugar. A small pair of scales. A hammer. Keys. A spit. A needle case. A writing case with penknife, pen, forceps, reed pens, and pen stand. A quire of paper for writing. Red wax. A water jug. Salt cellar. Knives. Spoons. Forks [...].

The Mass of the Holy Spirit (celebrated by Giuliano della Rovere rather than Borja who as Dean would traditionally have been the celebrant) and then a speech by Bernardino Lopez de Carvajal, a Spaniard and the ambassador to Ferdinand and Isabella, on the "evils afflicting the Church" preceded the beginning of the conclave on 6 August 1492. Another Spaniard, Gonzalo Fernandez de Heredia, archbishop of Tarragona, was appointed prefect of the Vatican. Two important offices during sede vacante were filled with compatriots of Cardinal Borja, and it is believed that they both were chosen by Borja in his capacity as Dean to strengthen his position before the conclave.

The remainder of 6 August was consumed by the drafting and subscription to the conclave capitulation, which—although not extant—is known to have restricted the number of new cardinals which could be created by the new pope.

== Vote count ==
Nationality of cardinal electors
Country	Number of electors
Papal States, Savona	4 each
Genoa, Milan, Naples, Venice	3 each
Florence, Portugal, Spain	1 each

The first ballot ("scrutiny"), held on 8 August was said to have resulted in nine votes for Carafa, seven for Borja, Costa, and Michiel, and five for Giuliano della Rovere, with Sforza notably receiving zero votes.

The second ballot produced nine for Carafa, eight for Borja, seven for Michiel, and five for Giuliano della Rovere.

According to the Florentine Ambassador, one of the guards of the conclave, as of 10 August there had been three unsuccessful ballots, favoring Costa and Carafa, but in no way indicating Borja might be chosen. According to Sigismondo de' Conti, papal secretary and chronicler, the vote was unanimous on the fourth ballot, taken early in the morning on 11 August although Borja had only 15 votes prior to the accessus; other accounts say Borja received all the votes except for his own, which he gave to Carafa.

According to the Catholic Encyclopedia, the election of Rodrigo Borja was "almost entirely due to" Giambattisti Orsini.

== Allegations of simony ==
Pope Alexander VI, painted by Pinturicchio

According to Pastor, 'the corruption during the reign of Pope Innocent VIII had increased to such an extent that it became possible by bribery to procure the election of such a successor as Pope Alexander VI'. The Venetian envoy to Milan informed his confrère in Ferrara: "that by simony and a thousand villanies and indecencies the papacy has been sold, which is a disgraceful and detestable business", adding that he expected Spain and France to withhold their support from the new pontiff. After the conclave, a ubiquitous epigram within Rome was: "Alexander sells the Keys, the Altar, Christ Himself—he has a right to for he bought them."

On 10 August after the third ballot, Ascanio Sforza allegedly came to believe his own ambitions of being elected pope were impossible and became susceptible to Borja's offer: the office of Vice-Chancellor and the associated Palazzo Borgia, the Castle of Nepi, the bishopric of Erlau (with annual revenue of 10,000 ducats) and other benefices. Sforza was also reputed to have received four mule-loads of silver (some sources say gold), which Borja ordered to be delivered immediately after the deal was struck. The price of the other cardinals was as follows: Orsini, the fortified towns of Monticelli and Soriano, the legation of the Marches, and the bishopric of Cartagena (with annual revenue of 5,000 ducats); Colonna, the abbey of Subiaco and its environs (with annual revenue of 3,000 ducats); Savelli, Civita Castellana and the bishopric of Mallorca; Pallavicini, the bishopric of Pamplona; Michiel, the suburbicarian see of Porto; Riario, Spanish benefices with annual income of 4,000 ducats and the return of a house in the Piazza Navona (which Sforza had occupied) to the children of Count Girolamo. Sanseverino's compensation included Rodrigo Borgia's house in Milan. Cardinals Sclafenati and Domenico della Rovere were to receive abbacies and/or benefices. Cardinals Andicino della Porta and Conti followed Sforza, whom they had originally supported.

The aforementioned cardinals plus Borja's own vote numbered 14, one short of the required two-thirds majority. However, Cardinals Carafa, Costa, Piccolomini, Cibò, and Zeno, followed by Medici, were unwilling to be bribed. Cardinal Giuliano della Rovere, followed by Basso, was intractably opposed to Borja's election. Thus, the eighty-six-year-old Gherardo, the Cardinal Patriarch of Venice, who was paid only 5,000 ducats, constituted the deciding vote.

According to Professor Picotti, who extensively researched the conclave and came to the conclusion that simony had occurred, no accounts of papal income and expenditure exist in the registers of Introitus et Exitus for August 1492, and debts from the Apostolic Camera to Cardinals Campofregoso, Domenico della Rovere, Sanseverino, and Orsini appeared soon afterwards. The Spannocchi bank, which housed much of Borja's wealth, was said to have nearly crashed after the conclave due to the velocity of transactions.

Some sources say that Charles VIII of France had bankrolled 200,000 ducats (plus 100,000 ducats from the Doge of Genoa) for the election of Giuliano della Rovere, although several otherwise bribable cardinals were hostile to French interference.

Other historians regard politics as a stronger factor within the conclave than pure simony, with the personal rivalry between Giuliano della Rovere and Ascanio Sforza (who had met to discuss the upcoming conclave in Castel Gandolfo even before Innocent VIII had died) substituting for the ancient struggle between Naples and Milan, with the intractability between the two parties making Borja a viable candidate.

== Aftermath ==
When Giuliano della Rovere was elected Pope Julius II in 1503, he issued a bull annulling any papal election brought about by simony, and defrocking and excommunicating any cardinal who sold his vote. Although the twenty-six day reign of Pope Pius III intervened between Alexander VI and Julius II, the alleged unscrupulousness of the Borgia pope was still firmly in the institutional memory of the Roman Curia. While cardinal during the reign of Alexander VI, Julius II had been assailed politically and often militarily outside the sturdy wall of his Castle of Ostia.

== Media ==
The conclave is fictionalized in the 2011 premiere episode of the Showtime series The Borgias, with Jeremy Irons as Borja and Colm Feore as della Rovere, and across several episodes of Tom Fontana's Borgia of the same year, with John Doman as Borja and Dejan Čukić as della Rovere.

For multiple years, academic and author Ada Palmer has regularly held a course at the University of Chicago simulating the 1492 papal conclave.
