= Ascanio Sforza =

Italian cardinal of the Catholic church

Cardinal Ascanio Maria Sforza
- Cardinal-Deacon
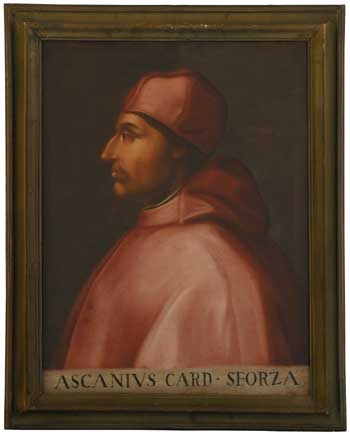
- Church: Ss. Vito e Modesto
- Diocese: Administrator of 9 dioceses

Orders
- Created cardinal: 17 March 1484 by Pope Sixtus IV
- Rank: Cardinal-Deacon

Personal details
- Born: 3 March 1455 Cremona, Lombardy
- Died: 28 May 1505 (aged 50) Rome, Papal States
- Buried: S. Maria del Popolo, Rome
- Residence: Rome
- Parents: Francesco Sforza, Duke of Milan; Bianca Maria Visconti
- Occupation: Courtier; politician
- Profession: Cleric
- Education: Home schooled by Francesco Filelfo

Ascanio Maria Sforza Visconti (3 March 1455 – 28 May 1505) was an Italian cardinal of the Catholic Church. Generally known as a skilled diplomat who played a major role in the election of Rodrigo Borgia as Pope Alexander VI, Sforza served as Vice-Chancellor of the Holy Roman Church from 1492 until 1505.

== Biography ==
=== Early years ===
A member of the House of Sforza, Ascanio Sforza was born in Cremona, Lombardy. His parents were Francesco Sforza, Duke of Milan, and Bianca Maria Visconti. He was also the brother of two Milanese dukes, Galeazzo Maria Sforza (1466–1476) and Ludovico Sforza (1494–1499), and the uncle of a third, Gian Galeazzo Sforza (1476–1494). Ascanio was a student of Francesco Filelfo, a courtier of Duke Francesco Sforza, who introduced him to government and literature. Other cardinals of the family were Guido Ascanio Sforza di Santa Fiora (1534), Alessandro Sforza (1565), Francesco Sforza (1583) and Federico Sforza (1645).

Aged 10, he was named commendatory abbot of Chiaravalle. While still an adolescent, Ascanio was promised the red hat of a cardinal of the Roman Catholic Church by Guillaume d'Estouteville, who wanted to gain Galeazzo Maria Sforza's support for his candidacy for the papal throne in 1471. However, it was in fact Francesco della Rovere (Sixtus IV) who won the papal election, and Ascanio's promotion to cardinal was delayed.

In September 1473, Ascanio's niece Caterina, the daughter of Duke Galeazzo Maria, was married to the nephew of Pope Sixtus IV, Girolamo Riario (the brother of Cardinal Pietro Riario). Girolamo was one of the leading members of the Pazzi Conspiracy against the life of Lorenzo the Magnificent of Florence.

Hoping to pacify Milan, Sixtus IV attempted to create Ascanio a cardinal in 1477, but the Sacred College refused to accept him into its ranks.

=== Episcopate ===
Nevertheless, Ascanio entered the episcopate when he was appointed Bishop of Pavia in September 1479, retaining the diocese until his death. In 1484 he represented Ludovico Sforza at the Congress of Cremona.

=== Cardinalate ===
Coat of Arms of Cardinal Ascanio Sforza

Pope Sixtus IV finally created him cardinal deacon of Ss. Vito e Modesto on 17 March 1484. Ascanio entered Rome on 23 August of the same year. Pope Sixtus had died on 12 August, and the Conclave to elect his successor was about to begin. Cardinal Ascanio's formal ceremony of investiture had not taken place, and some cardinals voiced objections to his participation in the forthcoming conclave. Due to Cardinal Rodrigo Borgia’s intervention, however, Ascanio was received with full cardinalitial rights. Ascanio was given an important assignment by his brother Ludovico, who at the time was Duke of Bari and Regent of Milan. Ascanio and Cardinal Giovanni d'Aragona were to present a formal letter to the Cardinals in Congregation, advising them that Milan opposed the election of Cardinals Barbo, Costa, Cibò, and Savelli. Cibò and Savelli were followers of Cardinal Giuliano della Rovere and his pro-French policy. Unfortunately, the letter from Duke Ludovico, sent on 26 August, did not reach their hands in time; otherwise, it would have been the earliest known attempt at an exclusiva (veto) in a papal election. Giovanni Battista Cybo was elected Pope Innocent VIII on 29 August 1484.

Sforza became administrator of Novara from 25 October 1484 to 18 April 1485, occupying the post again in May 1505, a few days before his death on 27 May.

As a cardinal, Ascanio's main priority was to reconcile Ferdinand I of Naples, known as Ferrante, with the Sforza dynasty. A dispute with Cardinal Jean Balue, the French ambassador to the Papal Court, in March 1486 complicated matters. Balue had suggested that Innocent VIII summon René II, Duke of Lorraine to retrieve his rights over the Neapolitan throne – leading to a violent quarrel with Ascanio; to which only the pope could bring a halt.

Ascanio was appointed Administrator of the See of Cremona on 28 July 1486 and occupied the post until his death. He also became Administrator of the See of Pesaro in 1487 until May 1491. In 1490 Sforza commissioned Bramante and Giovanni Antonio Amadeo to construct the Chiostro Grande ("large cloister") and the chapterhouse at Chiaravalle.

In his effort to ally Naples with Milan, he received Ferdinand of Capua, Ferrante's grandson, in his palace in Trastevere in May 1492. The banquet organised in honour of the Neapolitan prince was so extravagant and magnificent that, according to Stefano Infessura, If I were to give an account, no one would believe me. It is enough that if the King of France or some similar person should visit, nothing more could be provided. Ferdinand hoped to arrange a marriage between another of King Ferrante's grandsons, Don Luigi d'Aragona, with a member of Pope Innocent's family, Battistina Cibò. The alliance was hoped to put some distance between Innocent and the French. At the same time, Ferdinand of Capua was seeking to obtain the investiture of Naples from the Pope, thereby solidifying his family's hold on the Kingdom, to the prejudice of René II, Duke of Lorraine, the French claimant. On 4 June 1492, Pope Innocent issued a bull, determining that King Ferrante would be succeeded by his son Alfonso, and Alfonso by Ferdinand. The French were checked. The Milanese were happy.

=== Vice-Chancellor ===
In the Conclave of August 1492, after having accepted that he would not be able to obtain the papal tiara for himself, Ascanio promised his vote to Rodrigo Borgia, then-Vice-Chancellor of the Holy Roman Church. Borgia promised Sforza the office of Vice-Chancellor of the Holy Roman Church, as well as the Palazzo Borgia. In addition, he would receive the castle at Nepi, the Bishopric of Eger (which had an annual income of 10,000 ducats), two canonries, and the office of Prior of a convent in the diocese of Calahorra which was held by Borgia. Borgia was elected to the papal throne partly due to Ascanio's persuasive manner, becoming Alexander VI. He appointed Ascanio his Vice-Chancellor as he had promised, making him the virtual prime minister of the Holy See. Sforza resigned his deaconry of S. Vito e Modesto on 26 August 1492 and opted for it again on 31 January 1495 and occupied it until his death. He was named administrator of the Metropolitan See of Eger on 31 August 1492, retaining that position until June 1496. In order to strengthen the relationship between his family and the papal house, Ascanio arranged the marriage of Giovanni Sforza, his cousin and governor of Pesaro, to Lucrezia Borgia, the Pope's illegitimate daughter, in 1493. The marriage was annulled in 1497, on grounds of non-consummation.

=== French invasion ===
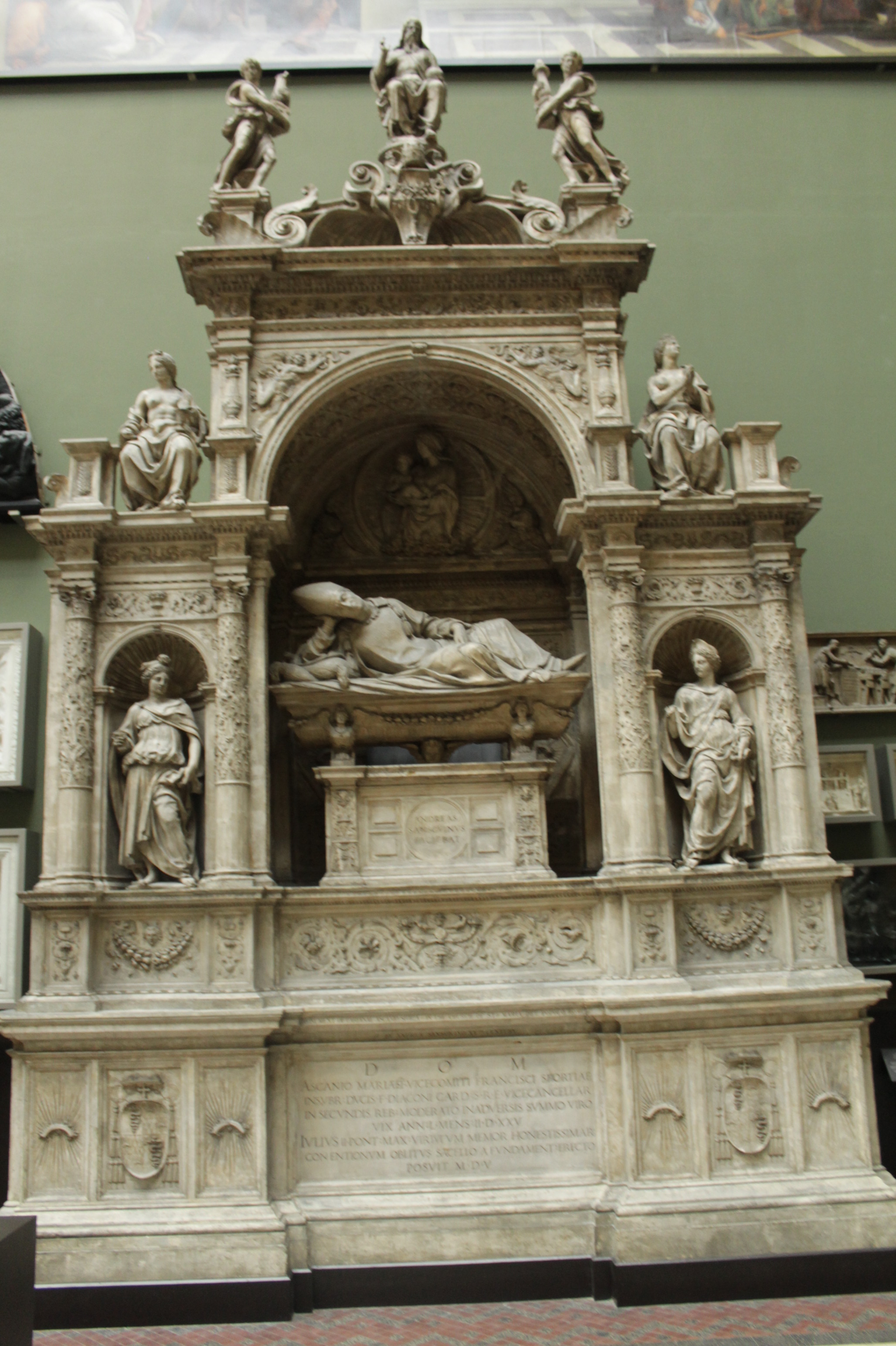
Tomb of Cardinal Ascanio Sforza, full size copy of the grave in Rome, cast in plaster, Victoria and Albert Museum

Cardinal Sforza was named Administrator of the diocese of Elne, a suffragan of the diocese of Narbonne in France, in January 1494; on 20 January 1495, Caesare Borgia was appointed Bishop of Elne, and Sforza relinquished the administratorship in May 1495.

The friendship between Ascanio and Alexander VI came to an end when the French invaded Italy in September 1494. Aware of Cardinal Giuliano della Rovere’s machinations against him, Alexander decided to resist the French. Ludovico Sforza, having secretly allied himself with King Charles VIII of France, Ascanio betrayed the Pope together with several cardinals and clamoured for his deposition under della Rovere. After the papal triumph over the King, Milan abandoned the French, and Ascanio was received once again in the Vatican. He never managed, however, to regain his former influence over the Pope. When Giovanni Borgia, the Pope's son, was stabbed in 1497, Ascanio did not attend the following consistory and was accused of the murder. He was immediately absolved, however, by the Pope.

When the French again invaded Italy with the support of the Holy See, Ascanio watched his brother Ludovico Sforza's downfall and imprisonment (1500), unable to act. On 15 June 1500, he was taken to France and imprisoned in Lyon, later at the Tour de Bourges. He was freed on 3 January 1502 based on his promise not to leave France without royal permission. He participated in the Papal conclave, September 1503. He made futile efforts to succeed Alexander VI, fighting against Cardinal della Rovere and Georges d'Amboise, the formal nominee of France. When Pius III (Francesco Piccolomini) died the same month of his coronation, Cardinal Sforza took part in the Papal conclave, October 1503, but Giuliano della Rovere (Julius II) was elected nearly unanimously.

On 23 May 1505, Cardinal Ascanio attended a Secret Consistory in good health and went hunting after lunch. On his return, he felt ill. He took medicine against the plague, but on Wednesday, 28 May, he took to his bed with a cold sweat. The fifty-year-old Ascanio died in Rome, in the house in his garden next to S. Girolamo dei Schiavoni, on 28 May 1505. It was not disappointment, however, that killed Cardinal Ascanio, but the plague (pestis inguinaria). He was buried that same evening, with no cardinal and neither Master of Ceremonies being present due to the plague. Julius II commissioned the erection of the Cardinal's tomb in the Cappella Maggiore of Santa Maria del Popolo, with a revealing inscription in which Pope Julius declared himself "mindful of [Ascanio's] most honourable virtues" and "forgetful of [past] contentions" ("virtutum memor honestissimarum, contentionum oblitus"). The artist was Andrea Sansovino.

=== The arts ===
Ascanio's lifelong focus on public affairs distracted his attention from being a patron of the arts. However, he was the one to introduce Josquin des Prez, the most famous musician of the Renaissance, to the papal court in 1486. He also commissioned the Liber musices of Florentius de Faxolis. Strenuous and hard-skinned as a politician, Ascanio preferred gambling rather than studying. He was undoubtedly Machiavellian, but also clear-sighted and intelligent, with haughty spirit and unflinching courage. His political morals were typical of his era and he remained dedicated to his love for Milan and for his family.

== Representations in popular culture ==
=== Television ===
- In the 1981 BBC series The Borgias, Cardinal Sforza is played by British actor Clive Merrison.
- In the 2011 Showtime series The Borgias, Cardinal Sforza is played by British actor Peter Sullivan.
- In the Canal+ series Borgia: Faith and Fear, Cardinal Sforza is played by English actor Christian McKay.

== Bibliography ==
- Moroni, Gaetano, ed. (1854). Dizionario di erudizione storico-ecclesiastica da S. Pietro sino ai nostri giorni ... (in Italian). Vol. LXV. Venezia: Tip. Emiliana. pp. 90–93.
- Pastor, Ludwig von. The History of the Popes, from the close of the Middle Ages, third edition, Volume V Saint Louis: B. Herder 1902.
- Pastor, Ludwig von. The History of the Popes, from the close of the Middle Ages, second edition, Volume VI Saint Louis: B. Herder 1902.
- Pélissier, Léon-Gabriel (1897). Le cardinal Ascanio Sforza prisonnier des Vénitiens (1500) (in French). Paris: Imprimerie Daupeley-Gouverneur.
- Pellegrini, Marco (2002). Ascanio Maria Sforza: la parabola politica di un cardinale-principe del Rinascimento. Nuovi studi storici, 60. (in Italian). Vol. 2 vols. Roma: Istituto storico italiano per il Medio Evo.
