= October 1503 conclave =

Election of Pope Julius II

Papal conclave October 1503

Dates and location
- October 1503; Apostolic Palace, Papal States

Key officials
- Dean: Giuliano della Rovere
- Camerlengo: Raffaele Riario
- Protodeacon: Giovanni Colonna

Election
- Electors: 38 (list)
- Ballots: 1

Elected pope
- Giuliano della Rovere; Name taken: Julius II
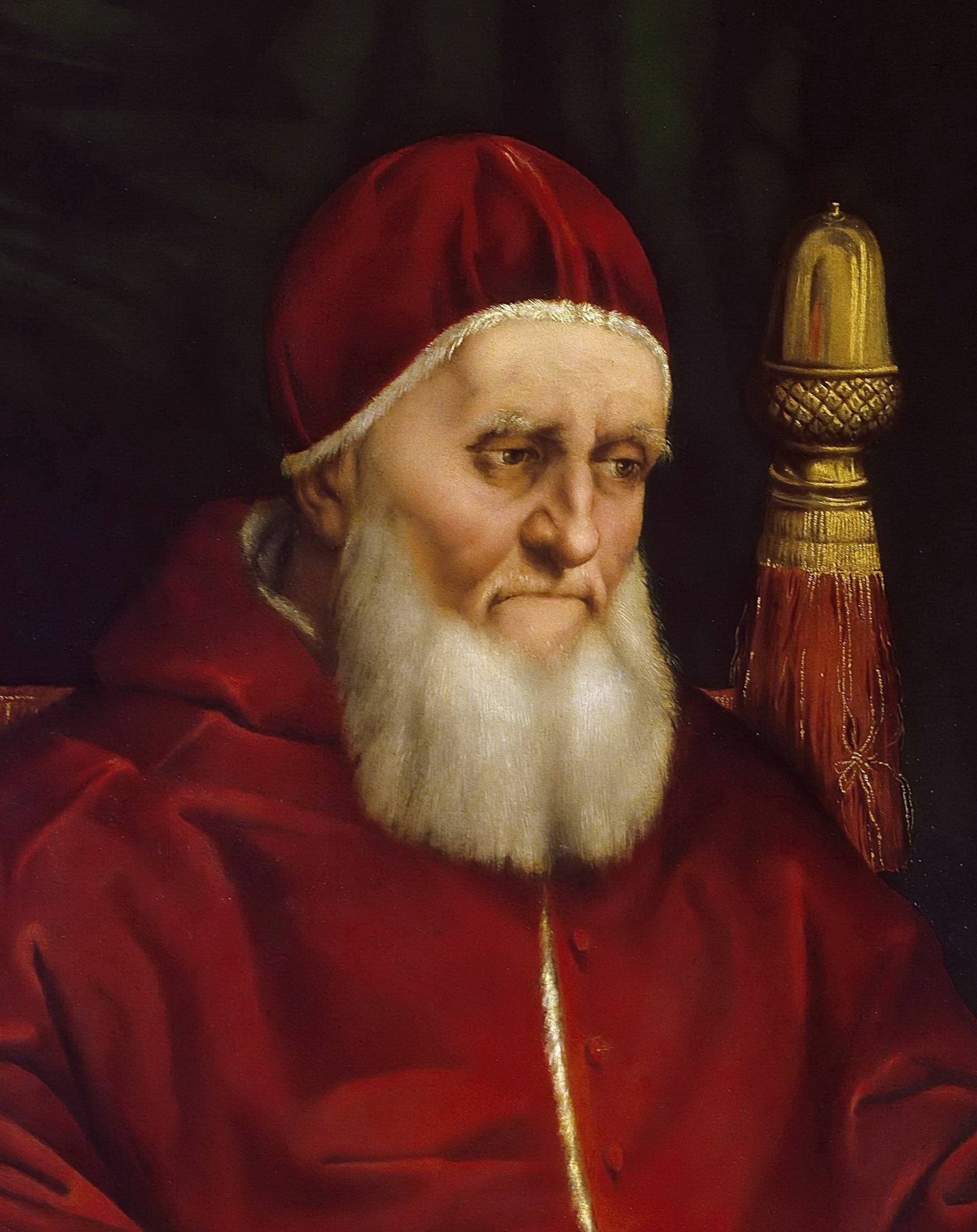

The October 1503 conclave elected Cardinal Giuliano della Rovere as Pope Julius II to succeed Pope Pius III. The conclave took place during the Italian Wars barely a month after the September 1503 conclave, and none of the electors had travelled far enough from Rome to miss the conclave. The number of participating cardinals was thirty-eight, the College of Cardinals having been reduced by the election of Piccolomini as Pius III, who did not elevate cardinals. At a consistory on 11 October Pope Pius had proposed to make Cardinal d'Amboise's nephew a cardinal, as part of his effort to conciliate the French, but the response from the cardinals was not enthusiastic.

== Background ==
The previous conclave in September 1503 had already been caught up in the Italian Wars, surrounded by the forces of Louis XII of France, those of Ferdinand II of Aragon, and those of Cesare Borgia the son of Pope Alexander VI. Cardinal Georges d'Amboise had been the favorite candidate of Louis XII. Cardinal Giuliano della Rovere, who had returned to Rome on 3 September 1503, following the death of Pope Alexander VI, was also a strong papabile. But it was Cardinal Francesco Piccolomini, who was the favorite of the bookmakers gambling on papal elections, who had been elected on 22 September.

Pius III (Francesco Todeschini-Piccolomini) was ordained a priest on 30 September 1503 and consecrated a bishop on 1 October 1503 by Cardinal Giuliano della Rovere, the Bishop of Ostia. He was crowned as Pope Pius III on 8 October. He died on 18 October, after just 26 days in office. The cardinals, who had attended the coronation and the succeeding consistories, had not dispersed, and so they were all able to assemble for the new conclave.

The number of cardinal electors who convened again to elect a new pope was larger than in September. Two cardinals who had not been at the September conclave were present for the October conclave: Ippolito d'Este and Pietro Isvalies, the Legate for Hungary. Cardinal d'Este had broken his leg while on his way to the September conclave. He returned to Rome on 28 October 1503.

It was reported by Niccolò Machiavelli to the Council of Ten in Florence on 31 October, the day of the beginning of the Conclave, that della Rovere was being given a 90% chance of being elected.

== Proceedings ==
See Cardinal electors for the 1503 papal conclaves.

In the month between the conclaves, della Rovere met with Cesare Borgia and the Spanish cardinals, whose support he lacked in the previous conclave, to assure them he would uphold Cesare's command (Gonfaloniere) of the papal army and his territorial possessions in Romagna (the Romandiola). Cesare delivered the support of all eleven Spanish cardinals. It was reported to the Council of the Ten of the Badia in Florence that della Rovere had promised that Cardinal Pedro Luis de Borja-Lanzol, Cesare Borgia's second-cousin, would be given the office of Major Penitentiary, the current holder of which was della Rovere himself. Coincidentally, Borja-Lanzol was actually named Major Penitentiary on 7 December 1503.

Della Rovere was also negotiating with Cardinal d'Amboise (the Cardinal of Rouen) on 5 October, according to information received in Venice from their ambassador in Rome. Georges d'Amboise also accepted the candidacy of della Rovere, regarding his own candidacy as impossible and della Rovere as the least threatening of the Italian cardinals to the French interests. It was reported by the Ambassador of Modena, Beltrando Costabili in a dispatch of 1 November, after the election, that the new Pope had dined with Cardinals Amboise, Sanseverino and Trivulzio, and that he had confirmed for Amboise his position as Legate in France, and had given him besides the Legateship in Avignon. His nephew, François Guillaume de Clermont, Archbishop of Narbonne, the intermediary in negotiations between Amboise and della Rovere, was named a cardinal on 29 November 1503.

Joannes Burchard, the papal Master of Ceremonies, records that the Conclave was enclosed at the first hour of the night on 31 October. Next morning there was a Mass of the Holy Spirit, held at the "sixteenth hour". This was followed by the signing of the Capitulations, by all thirty-seven cardinals.

=== Capitulations ===
Despite the claim of Frederic Baumgartner that there were no capitulations, there were electoral capitulations. They are carefully noted in Johannes Burchard's Diary, and they were signed by the Cardinals on 1 November 1503, All Saints' Day.

The Electoral Capitulations contained clauses relating to:

- the prosecution of the war against the Turks
- the summoning of a general council within two years
- forbidding the pope from making war against any of the great powers without a 2/3 vote of the Cardinals
- the Cardinals being consulted on all important matters, especially on the creation of new cardinals

=== Voting ===
After the Capitulations were dealt with, the Conclavists were removed and the doors closed, so that the voting could begin. The voting was by written ballot, and it was a preference ballot. One cardinal could name several candidates on the ballot, and five Cardinals did in fact take the trouble and time to do so. The details of each and every ballot were recorded by Burchard in his Diary, who also comments that all of the ballots were in the handwriting of the cardinal, except for three, which were written by an attendant.

Ascanio Sforza and his faction were reserved at first, but voted for della Rovere on the first scrutiny, due to various promises of favors. The vote was nearly unanimous for della Rovere on the first ballot, with the exception of his own vote, according to Baumgartner, which he cast for Amboise, Riario and Carafa. Baumgartner is not correct: Cardinal d'Amboise cast his vote for Carafa and Da Costa. There were therefore two ballots which did not name della Rovere. After his election, Cardinal Oliviero Carafa, the senior Cardinal Bishop, presented the new Pope with the Fisherman's ring (anulus Piscatoris) which had belonged to Pius III, but Julius produced a ring of his own, which caused some surprise. He then signed the Electoral Capitulations and took the oath to observe them. This was officially witnessed by Burchard in his capacity as a notary. The Pope declined to sign any of the rolls of supplications (requests for favors and benefices) put before him by the cardinals, but handed them over to Fabio Santorio, whom he named Datary, with the promise to sign them all, and the requests of the conclavists as well.

Louis XII of France who had opposed Piccolomini a month earlier—exclaiming about Cesare "that son of a whore has prevented Rouen from becoming pope!"— accepted the election of della Rovere, although they would soon be at war once Julius II formed the Catholic League.

The conclave is claimed to have been the shortest ever, less than ten hours.
