= September 1503 conclave =

Election of Catholic Pope Pius III

Papal conclave September 1503

Dates and location
- 16–22 September 1503; Apostolic Palace, Papal States

Key officials
- Dean: Giuliano della Rovere
- Camerlengo: Raffaele Riario
- Protodeacon: Francesco Piccolomini

Election
- Electors: 39 (list)
- Candidates: Giuliano della Rovere; Francesco Piccolomini; Georges d'Amboise
- Ballots: 2

Elected pope
- Francesco Piccolomini; Name taken: Pius III
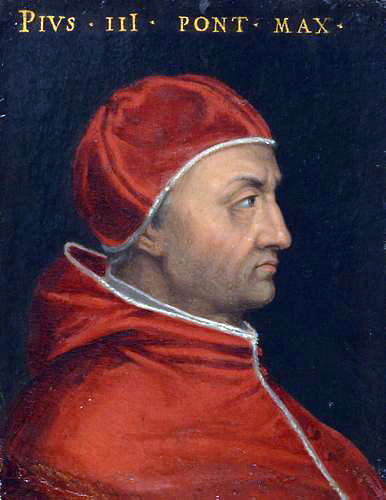

The September 1503 conclave elected Pope Pius III to succeed Pope Alexander VI. Due to the Italian Wars, the College of Cardinals was surrounded by three potentially hostile armies, loyal to Louis XII of France, Ferdinand II of Aragon, and Cesare Borgia (the cardinal-nephew and illegitimate son of Alexander VI).

The participation of thirty-nine cardinals, made possible by the delay of the funeral of Alexander VI, made the conclave the largest in history, up to that time, in terms of the number of electors. There were 21 Italian cardinals, 11 Spanish, and 7 French. A convergence of factors undid years of planning by Louis XII and his predecessor Charles VIII of France to promote the candidacy of Georges d'Amboise. After receiving far fewer votes than expected on the first ballot due to the independent candidacy of Giuliano della Rovere and the loss of control of the Spanish cardinals by Cesare Borgia, d'Amboise threw his support to Cardinal Francesco Piccolomini, who was elected Pius III on the second ballot despite receiving only four on the first.

== Background ==
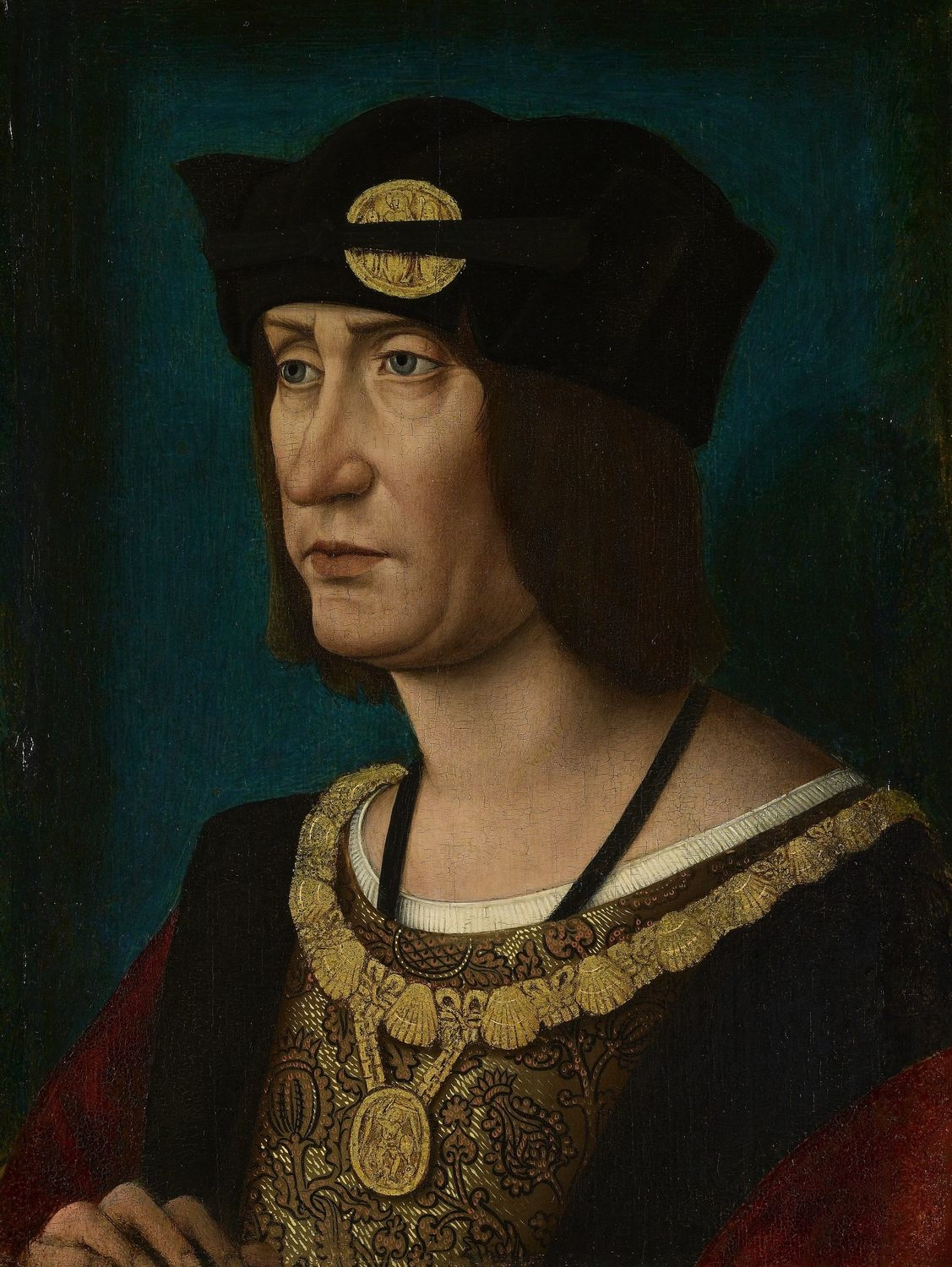
Louis XII of France

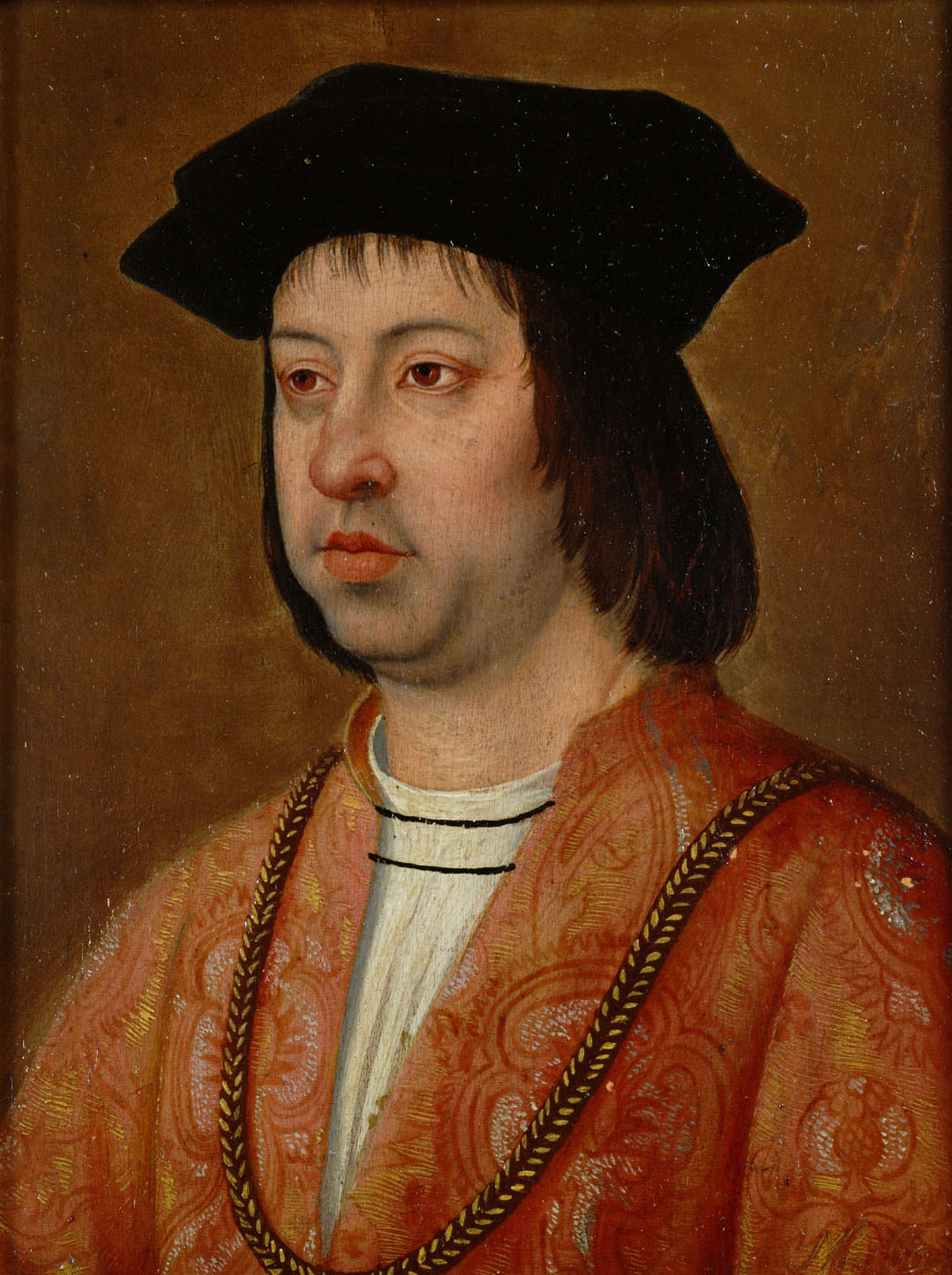
Ferdinand II of Aragon

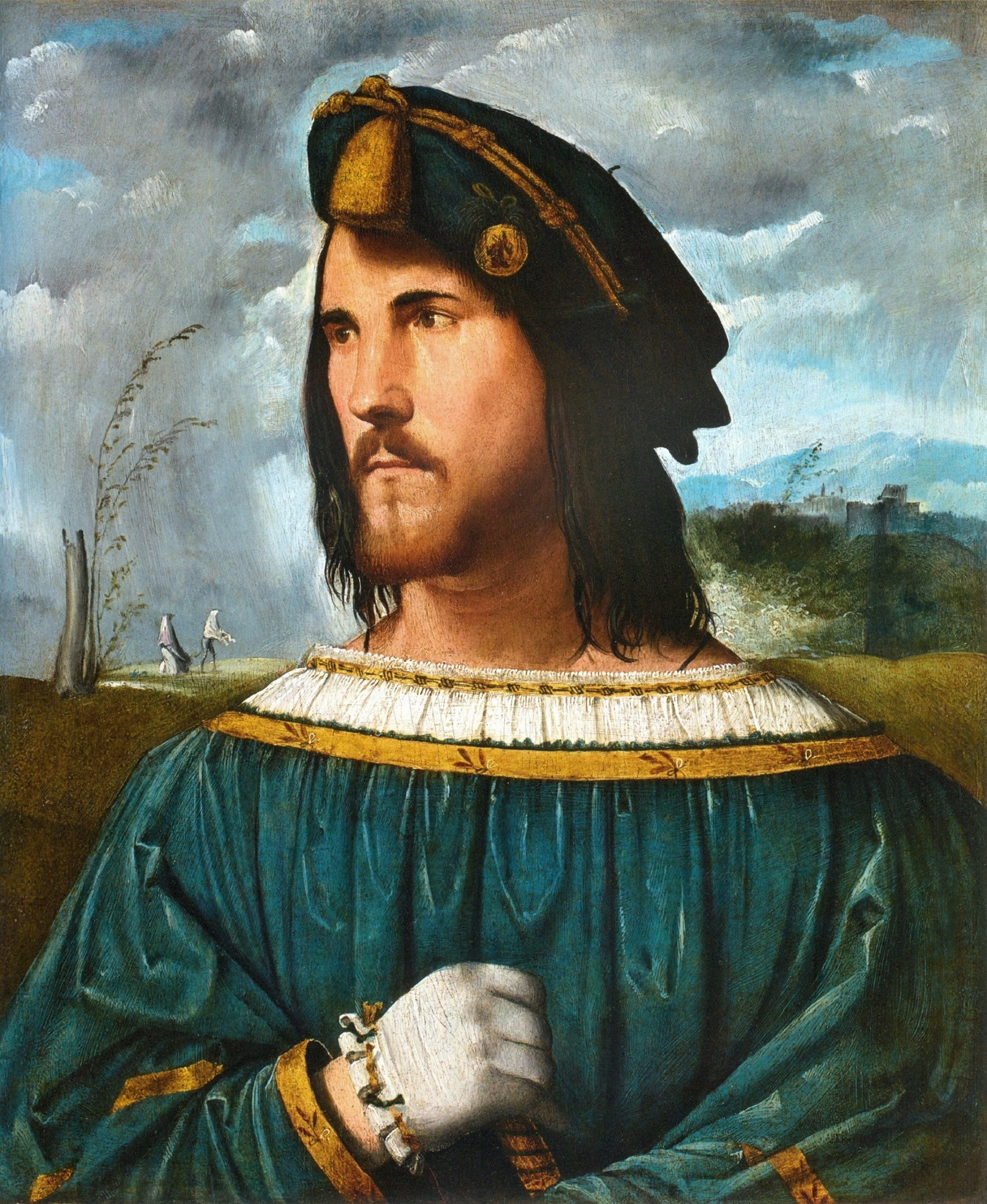
Cesare Borgia

The conclave was the first in two centuries held under the pall of an "outsider army". The Italian Wars had been under way since Charles VIII of France decided to enforce the Angevin claim to the Kingdom of Naples, ousting Ferrante of Aragon, who in turn was aided by his relative Ferdinand II of Aragon.

Alexander VI had initially sided with Ferdinand of Aragon but in 1498 recognized Louis XII of France, the heir of Charles VIII, as the king of Naples. Nevertheless, Ferdinand had made serious gains in the war, forcing Louis to send a reinforcement force in 1503 which neared Rome when Alexander VI died in August. Rather than continue to Naples, Louis XII ordered his force to wait outside Rome for the duration of the conclave. The Neapolitan army was only forty miles to the South as well.

Cesare Borgia, Alexander VI's former cardinal-nephew and Captain General of the Church also commanded a papal army within the walls of Rome; however, Cesare's influence was weakened by his sudden illness. The College of Cardinals initially decided to meet in Castel Sant'Angelo due to the triple threat of armed interference, and the start of the conclave was delayed by the need to prepare the building for this new use and for Cesare acquiesce to removing his troops from the city. However, on September 3, the college elected to move to a chapel in the Apostolic Palace designed by Niccolò dell'Arca.

== Cardinal-electors ==
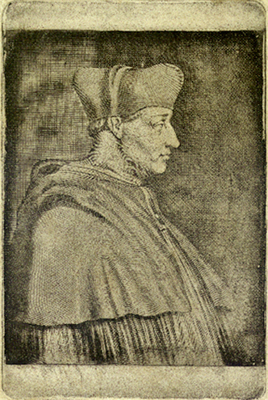
Georges d'Amboise, the candidate of Louis XII

There were thirty-nine cardinal electors.

Cardinal Georges d'Amboise was the favorite of Louis XII, and also expected the support of the faction of Cardinal Giuliano della Rovere (future Pope Julius II), who had fled to France due to a dispute with Alexander VI. Furthermore, Charles VIII and later Louis XII had been campaigning of d'Amboise's behalf for years and had entered into a secret treaty with Cesare Borgia for the support of the eleven Spanish cardinals (more loyal to Cesare than the Spanish monarch) in exchange for the maintenance of his numerous territorial claims. Ascanio Sforza, who had been taken prisoner by the French in 1500 when they captured Milan, was also freed in exchange for his promise to vote for d'Amboise.

D'Amboise was also bankrolled with a large sum of gold and—according to the Venetian ambassador—no attempt at bribe or threat was spared. The Roman crowds hailed him as the next pope when he triumphantly entered the city on September 10.

A French agent informed the college that the king would regard it as a "major affront" were the conclave to begin before the arrival of d'Amboise and the other French cardinals. Della Rovere, from Genoa, also sent a courier to demand the college await his arrival as well. Rather than begin the conclave after the proscribed ten days after the pope's funeral, the college opted to delay Alexander VI's funeral to accommodate these demands, and the conclave was entered on September 21. d'Amboise and his supporters were able to arrive in time and only two of the eight absent cardinals were French.

The thirty-nine cardinal-electors made the election the largest since the creation of the conclave.

=== The papabile ===
The Roman bookmakers, accustomed to gambling on papal elections, did not regard d'Amboise's election as certainly as the Roman public. His odds were set at 13 to 100, while della Rovere's were 15 to 100; Cardinal Piccolomini (elected Pope Pius III) was the favorite at 30 to 100.

== Proceedings ==
The French released Ascanio Sforza from captivity for his vote.

The cardinals began by drafting a conclave capitulation, unlike all previous capitulations in that it contained no mention of limiting the size of the College of Cardinals to 24. It did, however, include a payment of 2,400 ducats from the pope annually to any cardinal with income less than 6,000 ducats.

The French cardinals soon discovered the wisdom of the bookmakers, having underestimated della Rovere's ambition and overestimated his loyalty. He declared that he would only vote for d'Amboise if he was the final vote needed for d'Amboise to be elected. Furthermore, della Rovere declared he wished to see an Italian pope rather than a "barbarian" (non-Italian) and feared the return of the Avignon Papacy, an opinion shared by all twenty-two Italian cardinals. d'Amboise agreed to move the French army farther north as a sign of good faith before he realized the intentions of della Rovere.

Ascanio Sforza, however, kept to his word to vote for d'Amboise, although he did not attempt to persuade any other Italian cardinal to do so.

Furthermore, Cesare Borgia proved too ill to exert control over the Spanish cardinals, who instead followed the instructions of the king of Spain to vote against the French. The Spaniards themselves could not be elected due to the antagonism of the Italian cardinals against Alexander VI.

=== Scrutinies ===
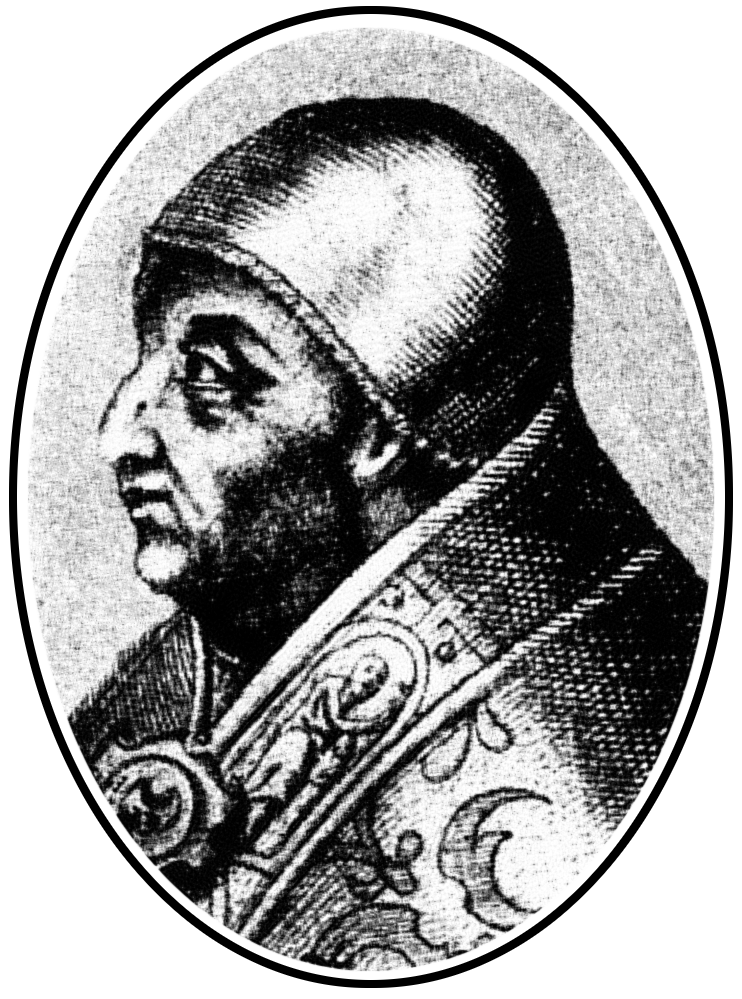
Pope Pius III was elected on the second vote.

The different accounts of the conclave (written by the conclavists for the various cardinals) disagree on the number of votes received by the three papabile; on the first scrutiny. Baumgartner regards as the most accurate the account according 15 votes to della Rovere, 13 to d'Amboise, and 4 to Piccolomini. This was bad news for d'Amboise, who knew that many of his pledged supporters had promised only to vote for him on the first scrutiny. Therefore, d'Amboise threw his support to Piccolomini.

Piccolomini was elected by accessus on the second scrutiny, taking the name Pius III after his uncle Pius II. The sixty-four-year-old Piccolomini was too ill even to attend this scrutiny. Since he was only a deacon, Piccolomini was ordained a bishop by della Rovere, only to die on October 18.
