= Pope Pius III =

Head of the Catholic Church in 1503

- Bishop of Rome
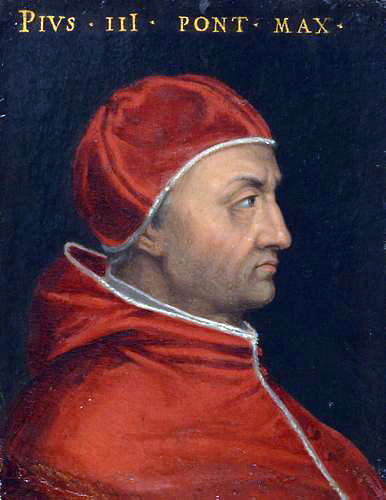
- Church: Catholic Church
- Papacy began: 22 September 1503
- Papacy ended: 18 October 1503
- Predecessor: Alexander VI
- Successor: Julius II
- Previous posts: Cardinal-Deacon of San Eustachio (1460–1503); Administrator of Siena (1460–1503); Archbishop of Siena (1460–1503); Archdeacon of Brabant (1462–1503); Legate to Rome and the Papal States (1464); Cardinal Protodeacon (1471–1503); Administrator of Fermo (1485–1494); Legate to Perugia (1488–1489); Cardinal Protector of England (1492–1503); Cardinal Protector of Germany (1492–1503); Legate to France (1493–1495); Administrator of Pienza and Montalcino (1495–1498); Administrator of Fermo (1496–1503)

Orders
- Ordination: 30 September 1503 by Giuliano della Rovere
- Consecration: 1 October 1503 by Giuliano della Rovere
- Created cardinal: 5 March 1460 by Pius II

Personal details
- Born: Francesco Todeschini-Piccolomini; 9 May 1439 Sarteano, Republic of Siena
- Died: 18 October 1503 (aged 64) Rome, Papal States
- Buried: St. Peter's Basilica; later moved to Sant'Andrea della Valle
- Coat of arms

Papal styles of Pope Pius III
- Reference style: His Holiness
- Spoken style: Your Holiness
- Religious style: Holy Father
- Posthumous style: None

Pope Pius III (Italian: Pio III, Latin: Pius Tertius; 9 May 1439 – 18 October 1503), born Francesco Todeschini, then Francesco Todeschini-Piccolomini, was head of the Catholic Church and leader of the Papal States from 22 September 1503 to his death. At just twenty-six days, he had one of the shortest pontificates in papal history.

Francesco was the nephew of Pope Pius II, who granted him the use of the family name "Piccolomini", and appointed the twenty-one-year old Francesco as Archbishop of Siena. He served as papal legate in a number of places. In 1503, the now-frail Francesco, known as Cardinal Piccolomini, was elected pope as a compromise candidate between the Borgia and della Rovere factions. Although he announced plans for reforms, he died less than a month later.

== Life ==
=== Early life ===
Francesco Todeschini-Piccolomini, a member of the House of Piccolomini was born in Sarteano on 9 May 1439, as the fourth child of Nanno Todeschini and Laudomia Piccolomini, the sister of Pope Pius II.

Francesco was received as a boy into the household of Aeneas Silvius who permitted him to assume the name and arms of the Piccolomini family. He studied Canon law at the University of Perugia, and obtained a doctorate after the completion of his studies.

=== Cardinalate ===
In 1457, Todeschini-Piccolomini was granted the office of Provost of the Collegiate Church of Sankt Viktor in Xanten (later Xanten Cathedral), which had been a benefice of his uncle. Francesco held the benefice from 1457 to 1466, and again from 1476 to 1495.

Cardinal Aeneas Silvius Piccolomini was elected pope as Pius II on 19 August 1458. In the excited tumult following the announcement, the Roman mob sacked his house, which was located near the church of S. Agostino, not far from the north end of the Piazza Navona; even the marble stones were taken. When the Piccolomini family arrived in Rome, therefore, they had no palazzo of their own to use as their base of operations. Francesco moved into the Vatican Palace with his uncle. Pius II was aware that this was a temporary situation; he remarked in a letter to his nephew Antonio that "One is not the nephew of a pope forever (non-semper pontificis nepos). In 1461, the Pope authorized Cardinal Francesco to purchase a property near the Campo de' Fiori in Rome which had belonged to the recently deceased Cardinal Giovanni Castiglione. The documents made it clear that it was not the Pope or the Papacy which were buying the property, but the Piccolomini family, and that it was private property, not property of the Church, even though Cardinal Francesco's deaconry was not far distant. On this land, Cardinal Francesco, with the Pope's help, built the Piccolomini Palace. In 1476, Cardinal Francesco deeded the palace to his brothers Giacomo and Andrea, and their descendants, on the condition that it not be alienated from the male line. The Palazzo Piccolomini no longer survives, having been razed to make room for the new church of Sant'Andrea della Valle, which was begun in 1591.

Piccolomini already held the office of protonotary apostolic at the time that he was appointed the administrator of the Archdiocese of Siena in 1460. He was granted the title and the insignia of an archbishop, but he did not receive episcopal consecration until a week before his coronation as pope. The episcopal duties at Siena were carried out by an auxiliary bishop, Antonio Fatati.

Pope Pius II, who was visiting Siena at the time, appointed his nephew a cardinal on 5 March 1460, naming him Cardinal-Deacon of Sant'Eustachio on 26 March.

He was also named commendatory abbot of the monastery of San Vigilio, Siena. He reconstructed and extended the residence next to the church, which he continued to use throughout his life.

In 1460, the Pope appointed him legate of the March of Ancona, with the experienced Bishop of Marsico as his counsellor. He departed Rome on 30 April, and returned on 1 February 1461 for consultations; he returned to Ancona on 1 June 1461, and was back in Rome on 8 November. He proved studious and effective in his job.

Piccolomini was made the archdeacon of Brabant in Cambrai in 1462 and he held that benefice until 1503. On 26 March 1463, Pope Pius II granted Cardinal Francesco the monastery of San Saba on the Aventine Hill in commendam. The cardinal immediately began extensive restoration, construction, and decoration works on the ancient buildings, spending at least 3,000 ducats on the work.

Piccolomini was named Vicar of Rome and the rest of the Papal States on 21 June 1464, as Pius II departed Rome for Ancona, where he intended to meet the Venetians and launch a crusade in the Balkans. However, Pius II died at Ancona on 14 August 1464, terminating the project.

==== Conclaves of 1464 and 1471 ====
Francesco Todeschini Piccolomini participated in the conclave that elected Pope Paul II in 1464. As a nephew of the late pope, he should have had considerable influence in the politics of the election. Of the twenty cardinals who participated, however, the twelve who had not been named by Pius II agreed among themselves that they would not vote to elect anyone except one of themselves. This excluded Francesco Piccolomini and all of his uncle's cardinals. As it happened, the first vote was still in progress when Cardinal Pietro Barbo of Venice received the required two-thirds of the votes, and the scrutiny was quickly made unanimous. He chose the name Paul II (1464–1471).

Cardinal Piccolomini was named Legatus de latere in Germany on 20 February 1471. He was accompanied as his secretary by Agostino Patrizi Piccolomini, the former private secretary of Pius II, who wrote an account of the mission. He departed on 18 March, and served in this important legation for the Imperial diet at Regensburg/Ratisbon, and was still there when the Pope died on 26 July 1471. Consequently, he was absent for the Conclave of 1471 which elected Pope Sixtus IV. He returned to Rome on 27 December 1471.

He succeeded to the position of Cardinal Protodeacon in 1471, upon the promotion of Cardinal Rodrigo Borgia to the see of Albano on 30 August 1471.

Francesco served in a new legation for Pope Sixtus IV, to restore ecclesiastical authority in Umbria.

==== Conclaves of 1484 and 1492 ====
Todeschini-Piccolomini participated in the conclave of 1484 which resulted in the election of Pope Innocent VIII, and as the protodeacon he made the first public announcement of the election and crowned the new pope. According to Stefano Infessura, he was one of the half-dozen cardinals who had slept soundly in their beds on the night between 28 August and 29 August, and had not participated in the clandestine midnight conferences that produced a two-thirds majority for Cardinal Giovanni Battista Cibo. Neither had he engaged in the extensive simoniac trading that took place.

He was made the administrator of Fermo in 1485; he resigned the position in 1494, in favor of Agostino Piccolomini. He was reappointed when Agostino resigned in 1496, and he kept that post until his election to the Papacy.

He was appointed papal legate to Perugia on 5 November 1488, and departed Rome on 15 November. He served in Perugia until 1489.

Todeschini-Piccolomini participated in the conclave of 1492 which elected Pope Alexander VI. He belonged to the faction of the more senior cardinals who gathered around Cardinal Oliviero Carafa of Naples. Cardinal Francesco was sufficiently respected that he received six votes at the first scrutiny (Sixteen were needed to elect), seven on the second, and one on the third. He resisted the election of Cardinal Rodrigo Borgia almost to the end, as one of the five hold-outs. As Cardinal Protodeacon Piccolomini announced and crowned the new pontiff.

He served as the protector of England at the Roman Curia from 1492 to 1503, and of Germany.

He was appointed legate to King Charles VIII of France, whose army was then entering Tuscany, in the consistory of 1 October 1494, departing Rome on 17 October; he returned to Rome on 5 March 1495, after the King declined to meet him. On 27 May 1495, he and numerous other cardinals accompanied Pope Alexander VI on a visit to Orvieto, which had been arranged to avoid a meeting between the Pope and King Charles, who was returning from his expedition against Naples. Charles was in Rome from 1 to 4 June, and the Pope and his retinue returned to the city on 27 June.

He was named the administrator of the diocese of Pienza and Montalcino on 31 October 1495, and occupied it until 14 March 1498, when he resigned in favor of his relative, Girolamo Piccolomini.

Following the murder of his son Giovanni Borgia in 1497, Alexander VI appointed Francesco Piccolomini a member of a commission of six cardinals, in a short-lived effort to reform the Roman Curia. On 8 February 1501, Pope Alexander also appointed Piccolomini, in his capacity as Protodeacon, to a commission to take charge of the income from the tithe (decuma), and dispensing it for yet another contemplated crusade against the Turks.

==== The Piccolomini Library ====
In 1502 he commissioned a library with access from an aisle of Siena Cathedral that was intended to house the library of humanist texts assembled by his uncle. Francesco commissioned the artist Pinturicchio to fresco its vault and ten narrative panels along the walls, depicting scenes from the life of Pope Pius II. Its iconography illustrating the donor's career gives an edited version of Pius II's life, passing over his former support of the Antipope Felix V. Though Pinturicchio labored for five years, the books never reached their splendid destination; yet the Piccolomini Library is a monument of the High Renaissance in Siena. Some of Pope Pius III's most famous portraits can be viewed in the Louvre Museum.

== Pontificate ==
=== Election to papacy ===
Pope Alexander VI died on 18 August 1503, and amid the disturbances consequent upon his death, it took the combined pressures of all the ambassadors in Rome to induce Cesare Borgia to withdraw from the city, so that an unpressured conclave might take place. Despite urgent pleas of the cardinals to stay away, both the Orsini and the Colonna factions entered the city with troops, intending to avenge old and new grievances. Because of these negotiations, the Conclave did not begin until 16 September. Cardinal Piccolomini was elected on 22 September 1503 and took the name "Pius III" after his uncle Pius II. This selection can be seen as a compromise between factions, Borgia and della Rovere, picking a frail cardinal with long experience in the Roman Curia over the kin of either Sixtus IV or Alexander VI.

=== Programme ===
On 25 September the new pontiff held an unusual Consistory meeting of cardinals and other officials, including the ambassadors of several states. Normally, a pope did not hold such meetings until after his coronation, but Pius III was faced with an emergency, and he was being hard pressed by the Spanish cardinals. A French army, which was nominally under the command of Cesare Borgia, who was ill and in bed, was demanding passage through Rome in order to attack the Spanish government in Naples. Naples was a papal fief, which complicated diplomacy. At the consistory, Pius first announced his desire to bring about peace between the kings of France and Spain. Then he promulgated the aims of his pontificate: the immediate reform of the church, with the establishment of a council of cardinals; strict reform of the expenses and financial situation of the church; peace in the Papal States; and the support of Cesare Borgia, now without his French support, against his enemies who were planning to murder him. The next day, he told the Venetian ambassador, Antonio Giustinian: "In consequence of the pressure put upon me by the Spanish cardinals, I have been compelled to some briefs in favour of Cesare Borgia, but I will not give him any further help. I do not intend to be a warlike, but a peace-loving pope."

=== Illness and death ===
On the morning of 26 September, the newly elected pope underwent an operation on his ulcerous left leg, enduring the pain of cutting in two places. The next day, he announced that he would not carry out the ceremony of the possession of his cathedral on the day of the coronation, as the custom was, because of his lameness.

Piccolomini was never ordained a priest, remaining in diaconal orders, until 30 September 1503, when he finally received ordination. Cardinal Giuliano della Rovere ordained him in one of the halls of the papal palace. Della Rovere and two other bishops consecrated him a bishop on 1 October 1503, in the same hall.

A Venetian agent in Rome reported the pope's ill health on 3 October, and politicking for the next conclave began.

The coronation took place on 8 October 1503. Cardinal Raffaello Riario, the Protodeacon, performed the coronation. Several of the features of the ritual had to be omitted due to Pius' troublesome leg. Johann Burchard, the papal master of ceremonies, noted that the pope said Mass sitting.

On Thursday, 12 October, as Beltrando Costabili reported to the Ercole I d'Este, Duke of Ferrara, Pope Pius had a long audience and did not eat during the day, having been taking medicine the previous day, on which the fever struck and never left him.

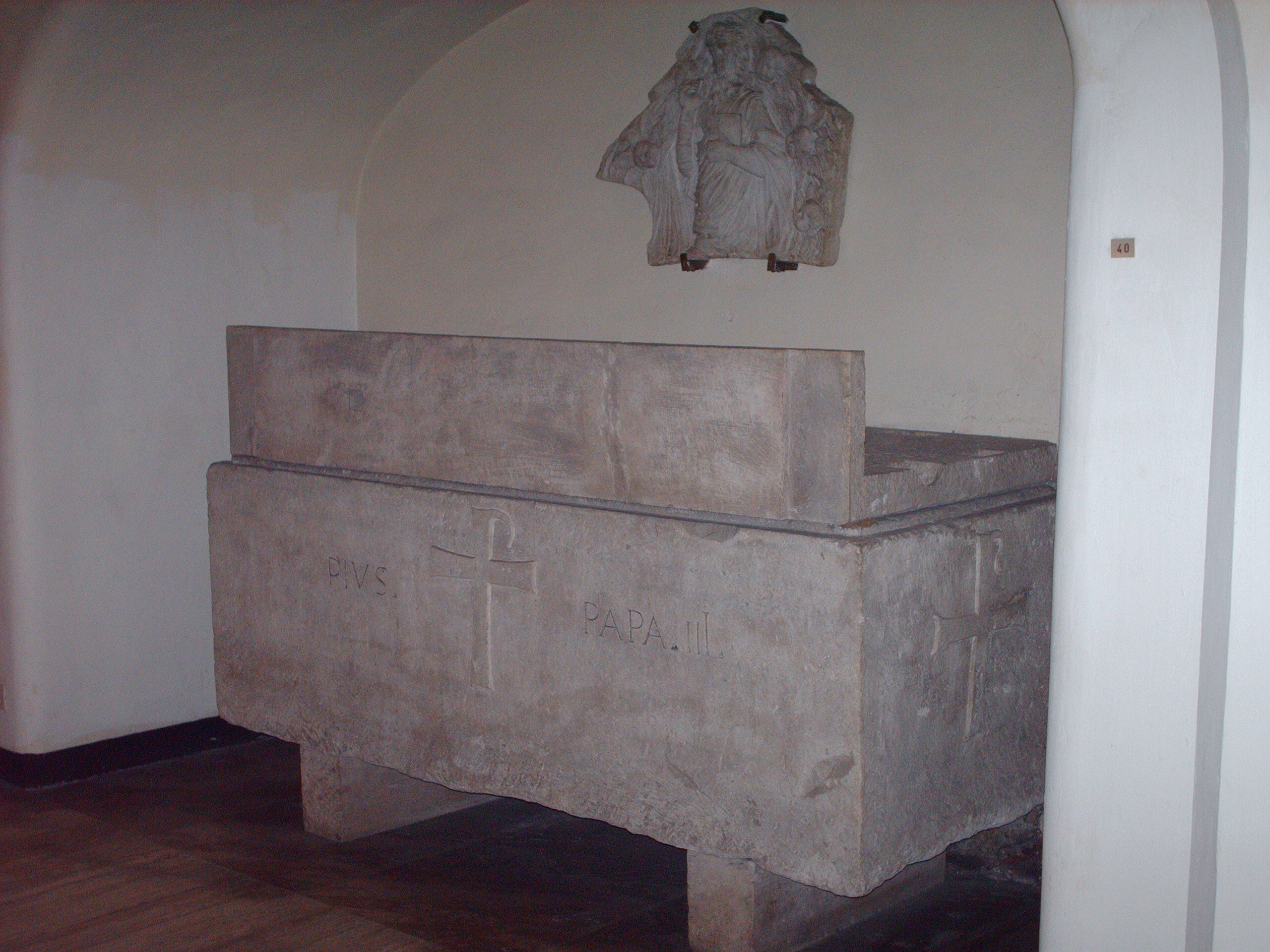
Former tomb of Pius III

After a brief pontificate of 26 days he died on 18 October 1503, of a septic ulcer in his leg. Some have alleged that Pope Pius died of poison administered at the instigation of Pandolfo Petrucci, the ruler of Siena.

He was buried in the chapel of San Andrea in Saint Peter's Basilica, next to his uncle Pius II, his brothers Giacomo and Andrea serving as his executors. He had already chosen his burial place when he wrote his will in 1493. When the basilica was being rebuilt, the monument was transferred below to the grottoes and the remains of Pius III and his uncle to the church of San Andrea della Valle in Rome put in a mausoleum created by Cardinal Alessandro Peretti di Montalto in 1614.

== See also ==
- Cardinal protector of England

== Bibliography ==
- Eubel, Conradus, ed. (1914). Hierarchia catholica (in Latin). Vol. Tomus II (second ed.). Münster: Libreria Regensbergiana.
- Hendrix, John (2003). History and Culture in Italy. Lanham MD USA: University Press of America. ISBN 978-0-7618-2628-6.
- Munman, Robert (1993). Sienese Renaissance Tomb Monuments. Philadelphia: American Philosophical Society. ISBN 978-0-87169-205-4.
- Nevola, Fabrizio (2007). Siena: Constructing the Renaissance City. New Haven CT USA: Yale University Press. ISBN 978-0-300-12678-5.
- Novembri, Valeria; Prezzolini, Carlo, eds. (2005). Francesco Tedeschini Piccolomini: papa Pio III : atti della Giornata di studi, Sarteano, 13 dicembre 2003 (in Italian). Montepulciano (Siena): Le Balze. ISBN 978-88-7539-079-2.
- Pastor, Ludwig von (1902). The History of the Popes: From the Close of the Middle Ages. Vol. VI (second ed.). London: K. Paul, Trench, Trübner & Company. pp. 185–231. 613–621.
- Piccolomini, Paolo (1903). "Il Pontificato di Pio III secondo le testimonianze di una fonte contemporanea," in: Archivio Storico Italiano, 5 serie, XXXII (1903), pp. 102–138. (in Italian)
- Richardson, Carol (1998). "The Lost Will and Testament of Cardinal Francesco Todeschini Piccolomini (1439–1503)," Papers of the British School at Rome Vol. 66 (1998), pp. 193–214.
- Richardson, Carol (2003). "The housing opportunities of a Renaissance cardinal." Renaissance Studies Vol. 17, No. 4 (2003), pp. 607–627.
- Strnad, A.A. (1966). "Francesco Todeschini-Piccolomini. Politik und Mäzenatentum im Quattrocento," in: Römische Historische Mitteilungen VIII-IX (1964–1966), pp. 101–425. (in German)
- The Encyclopædia Britannica, Vol.19, Ed. Thomas Spencer Baynes, Henry G. Allen Company, 1890.
- Ugurgieri della Berardenga, C. (1973). Pio II Piccolomini con notizie su P. III e altri membri della famiglia. Firenze 1973, pp. 504–523. (in Italian)
- Williams, George L., Papal Genealogy: The Families And Descendants of the Popes, McFarland & Company Inc., 1998.

Catholic Church titles
Preceded by Alexander VI	Pope; 22 September – 18 October 1503	Succeeded by Julius II
