= Notre-Dame-de-la-Sède Cathedral =

Cathedral in Saint-Lizier, France

Coordinates: 43°0′10″N 1°8′15″E

Notre-Dame-de-la-Sède Cathedral Cathédrale Notre-Dame-de-la-Sède de Saint-Lizier
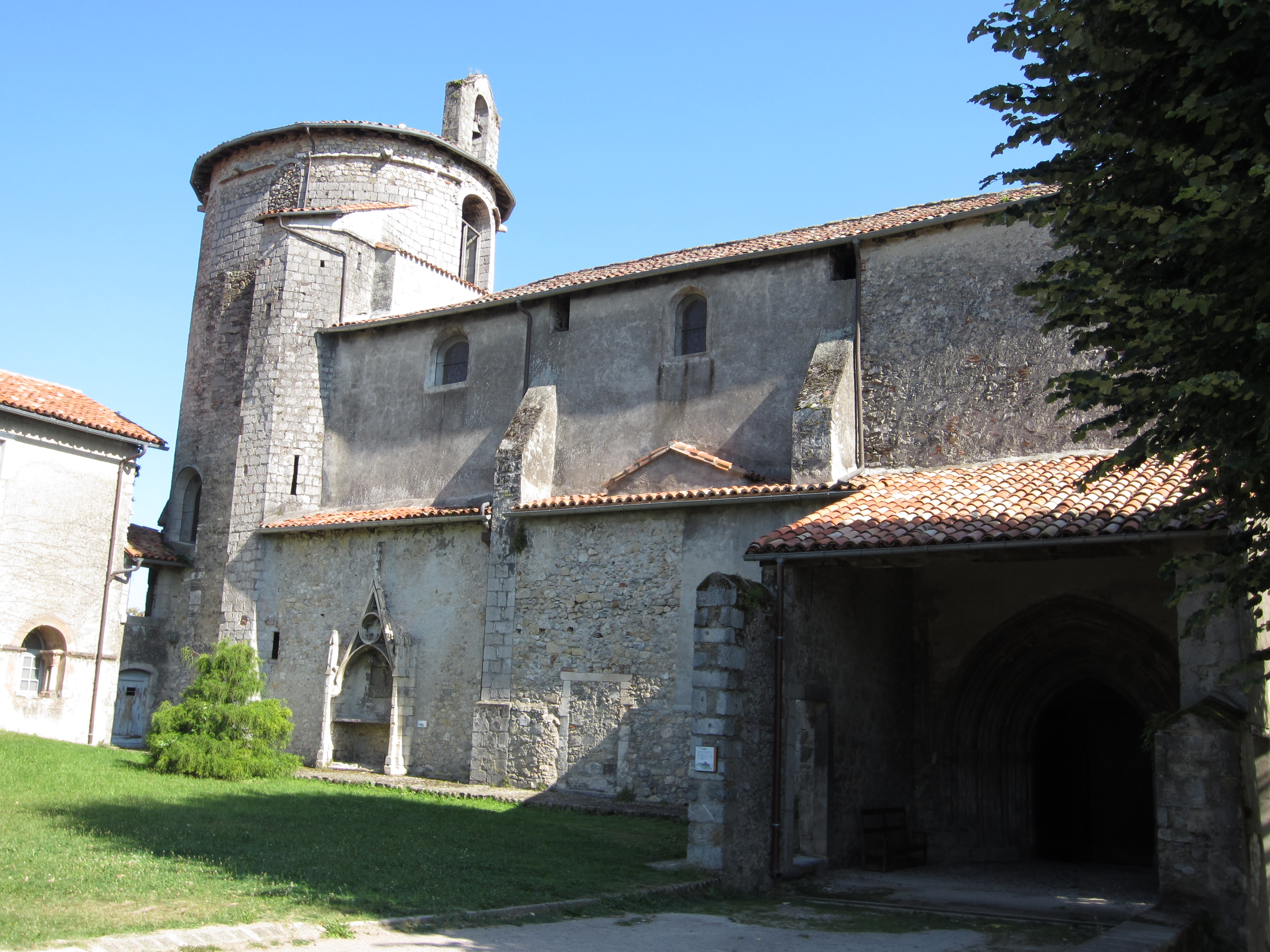

Religion
- Affiliation: Roman Catholic Church
- Region: Ariège
- Rite: Roman Rite
- Ecclesiastical or organisational status: Cathedral

Location
- Location: Saint-Lizier
- Interactive map of Notre-Dame-de-la-Sède Cathedral; Cathédrale Notre-Dame-de-la-Sède de Saint-Lizier

Architecture
- Type: church

Notre-Dame-de-la-Sède Cathedral (French: Cathédrale Notre-Dame-de-la-Sède de Saint-Lizier) is one of two former co-cathedrals of the town of Saint-Lizier in southern France. The other is the Saint-Lizier Cathedral. The town of Saint-Lizier was formerly the seat of the Bishop of Couserans. The diocese was abolished under civil constitution of the clergy in 1790, and this was confirmed by the Concordat of 1801.

== Architecture ==
The present church building dates from the 12th century, and was built at the site of an earlier church. It was enlarged in the 14th century, and modified in the 16th century. The adjacent bishop's palace was built around 1675. It has been listed since 1994 as a monument historique by the French Ministry of Culture.
