= Guido Pisanus =

Guido Pisanus is a Latin name that may refer to:

- Guido Pisano (died 1149), a prelate and diplomat
- Guido of Pisa (died 1169), a geographer
