= Glycerius (disambiguation) =

Glycerius (c. 420 – after 480) was a Western Roman Emperor reigning from 473 to 474.

Glycerius may also refer to:

- Saint Glycerius (bishop of Milan), 5th-century bishop
- Saint Glycerius of Antioch, deacon
- Saint Lycerius or Glycerius (died 548), bishop of Couserans in the 5th and 6th centuries
