= Navarrus of Acqs =

Navarrus of Acqs (French: Navarre d'Acqs) was the bishop of Couserans from 1207 to 1216.

Navarrus was a son of Raymond Arnald, viscount of Dax. He entered the Premonstratensian abbey of Combelongue, where he was elected abbot. For his strong opposition to Albigensianism, he was called "the terror and the hammer of the Albigensian heretics". During the Albigensian Crusade, Navarrus sided with the crusaders and worked closely with the papal legates. An undated document from the archives of Jaca Cathedral names a certain Navarrus as "legate of the apostolic see". This legation is usually attributed to the bishop of Couserans, but, as the document is usually dated to the decade beginning in 1229, Peter Linehan regards this legation as spurious.

In 1207, Navarrus, along with the legate Arnauld Amaury, received instructions from Pope Innocent III. In August or September, he attended the colloquy of Pamiers between the Waldensians and the Catholics. Pierre des Vaux-de-Cernay records that Navarrus and Folquet de Marselha were the messengers sent by the papal legates to Rome to announce the deaths of the legates Diego of Osma and Raoul de Fontfroide in 1207 and the murder of legate Pierre de Castelnau in 1208. The dating of his mission is uncertain. It may have taken place as late as 1209.

In 1209, Navarrus founded the Premonstratensian abbey of Divielle. During his episcopate, the town of Saint-Lizier, which belonged to his jurisdiction, was attacked by Count Bernard IV of Comminges. The Council of Lavaur (1213), which Navarrus may have attended, censures the count for this and other attacks on the church.

No surviving writings by Navarrus are known.

== Bibliography ==
- Dickens, Andrea Janelle (2024). Heresy in the Middle Ages: A History of Authority and Exclusion. Fortress Press.
- Dutton, Claire (1993). Aspects of the Institutional History of the Albigensian Crusades, 1198–1229 (Ph.D diss.). University of London.
- Gams, Pius Bonifatius (1873). Series episcoporum Ecclesiae catholicae: quotquot innotuerunt a beato Petro apostolo. Typis et Sumptibus Georgii Josephi Manz.
- Goovaerts, Léon (1899). Écrivains, artistes et savants de l'ordre de Prémontré. Société belge de librairie.
- Grado Merlo, Giovanni (2022). "Valdo (or Valdesius) of Lyons and the Poor in Spirit". In Marina Benedetti; Euan Cameron (eds.). A Companion to the Waldenses in the Middle Ages. Brill. pp. 11–33.
- Graham-Leigh, Elaine (2001). "Hirelings and Shepherds: Archbishop Berenguer of Narbonne (1191–1211) and the Ideal Bishop". The English Historical Review. 116 (469): 1083–1102. JSTOR 1562287.
- Graham-Leigh, Elaine (2005). The Southern French Nobility and the Albigensian Crusade. The Boydell Press.
- Linehan, Peter (1971). The Spanish Church and the Papacy in the Thirteenth Century. Cambridge University Press.
- Smith, Damian J. (2022). "The Early Waldenses and the Catholic Poor in the Crown of Aragon (12th–13th Centuries)". In Marina Benedetti; Euan Cameron (eds.). A Companion to the Waldenses in the Middle Ages. Brill. pp. 78–97.
- Tugwell, Simon (2003). "Notes on the Life of St Dominic". Archivum Fratrum Praedicatorum. 73: 5–141.
- Vicaire, M.-Humbert (1967). "Rencontre à Pamiers des courants vaudois et dominicain (1207)". Cahiers de Fanjeaux. 2: 163–194.
