= Saint-Lizier Cathedral =

Coordinates: 43°0′6″N 1°8′15″E

Saint-Lizier Cathedral Cathédrale Saint-Lizier de Saint-Lizier
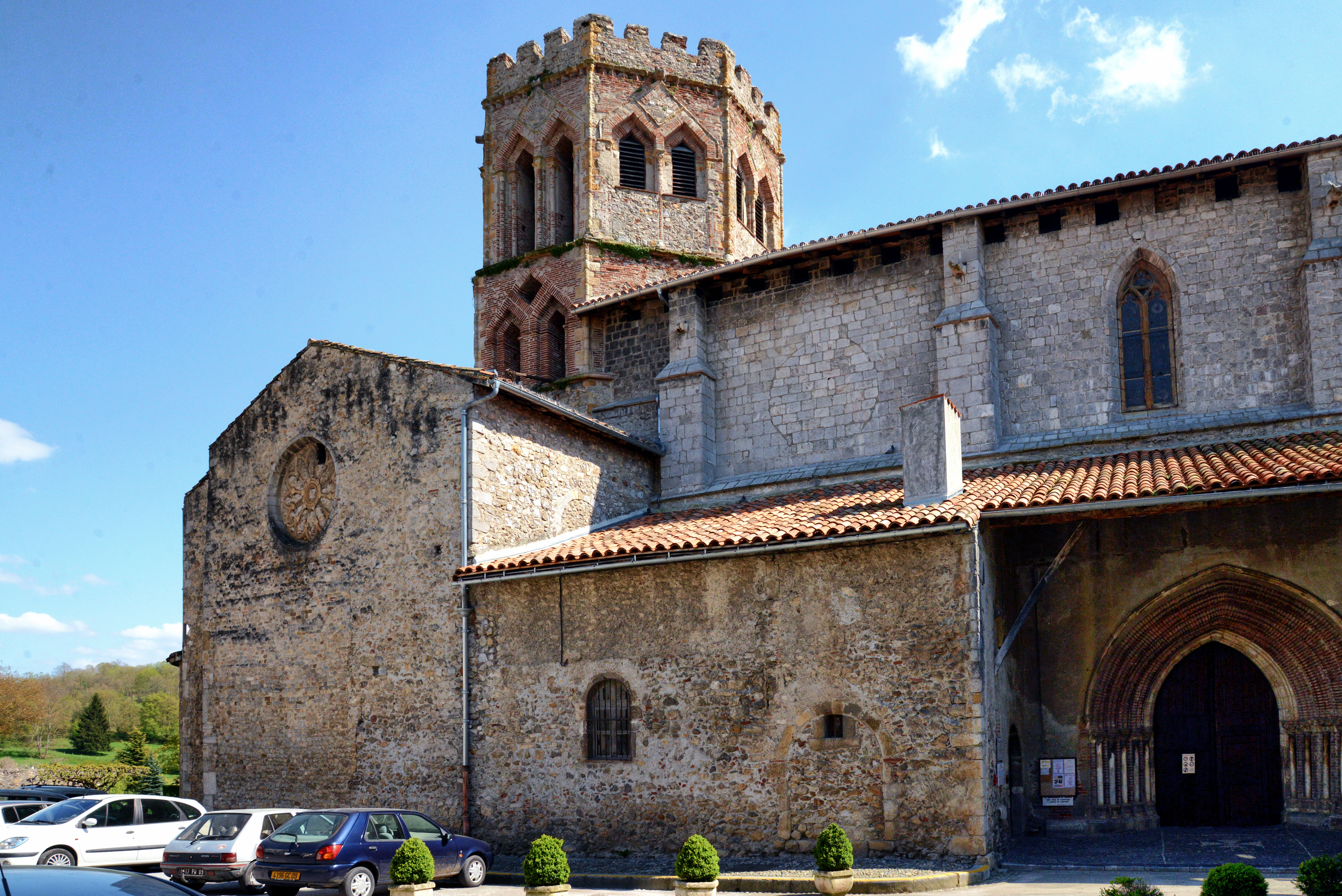

Religion
- Affiliation: Roman Catholic
- Region: Ariège
- Ecclesiastical or organisational status: Cathedral
- Status: Active

Location
- Location: Saint-Lizier
- Interactive map of Saint-Lizier Cathedral; Cathédrale Saint-Lizier de Saint-Lizier

Architecture
- Type: church

Saint-Lizier Cathedral (French: Cathédrale Saint-Lizier de Saint-Lizier) is one of two former co-cathedrals of the town of Saint-Lizier in southern France. The other is the Notre-Dame-de-la-Sède Cathedral. The Saint-Lizier Cathedral is dedicated to Saint Lycerius (French: Saint Lizier), an early bishop of Couserans, after whom the town itself is also named. It has been listed since 1886 as a monument historique by the French Ministry of Culture.

The town of Saint-Lizier, although now severely depopulated, was formerly the seat of the Bishop of Couserans. The diocese was abolished under the civil constitution of the clergy in 1790, and this was confirmed by the Concordat of 1801.

== Architecture ==
The present church building dates from the 11th century, with later additions. There is an adjacent Romanesque cloister.

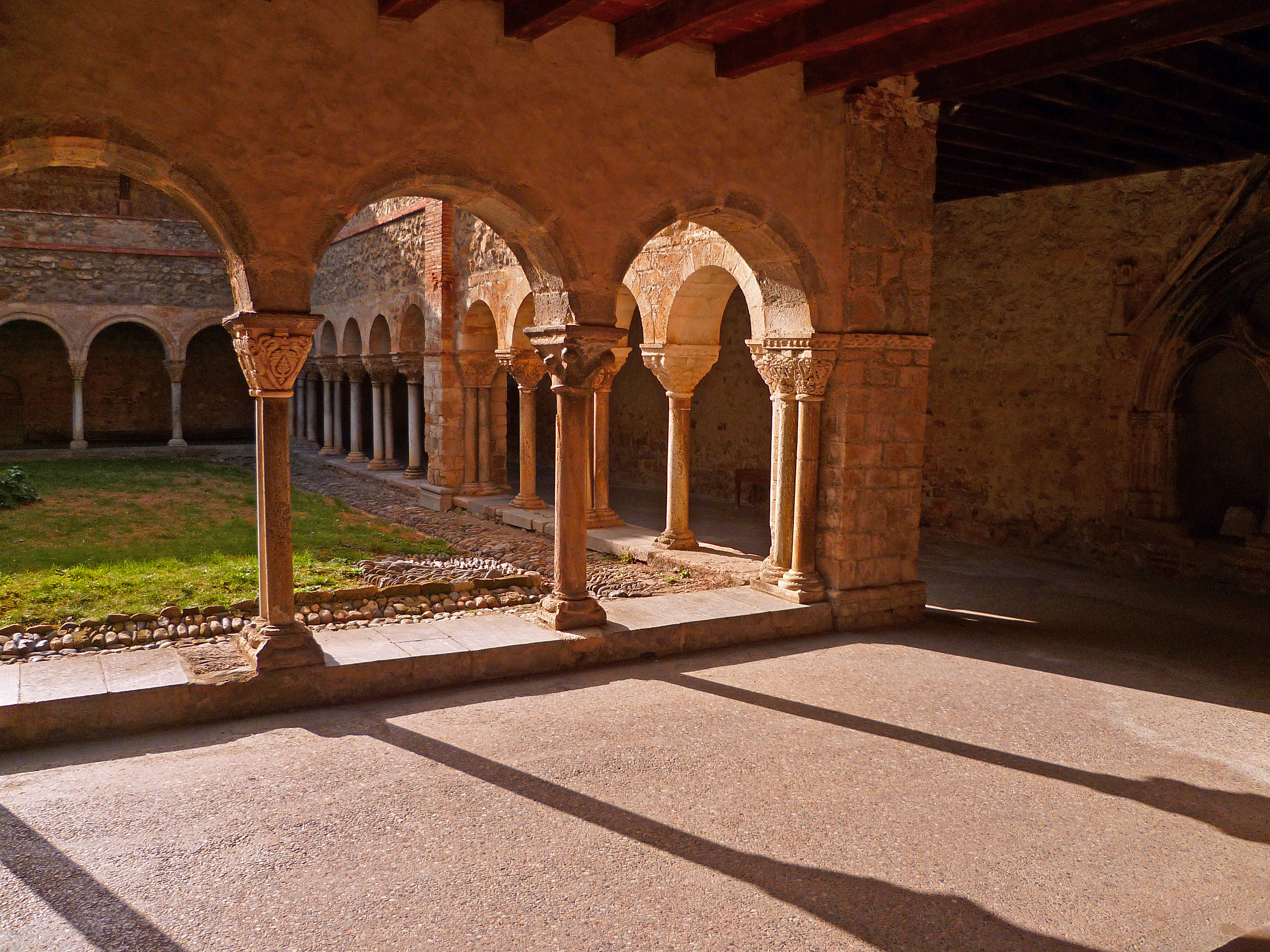
The cloister

=== The Church ===
The sanctuary is made up of a nave with three spans, without collateral or chapels, a transept, and three apses. The nave has a deviation of the very apparent axis due to the origin of the absidioles. The central apse, preceded by a cradle vault, was built at the end of the 11th century. The two small lateral apses are of unequal depth and are roughly constructed in two-meter-thick walls, showing an origin largely anterior to the 11th century. There are also two lateral towers of a Gallo-Roman gate, or of elements of a Frankish or Visigothic fortress.

The central apse corresponding to the choir is vaulte in a cul-de-four. The walls are covered with an exceptional set of Romanesque frescoes dating from the 11th century; Externally, the three apses are not ornamented: the apse presents three flat faces executed in particular with stones of great Roman apparatus and antique marbles recovered from the Gallo-Roman walls of the city.

The nave, which dates from the 12th century, is constructed of rough stones up to two-thirds of the height. The walls were subsequently raised in several stages, particularly in the 13th and 15th centuries. The upper part of the walls is pierced with Gothic windows. This part, as well as the lateral buttresses and the vault dates back to the end of the 15th century.
