= Lycerius =

French saint and bishop

Saint Lycerius
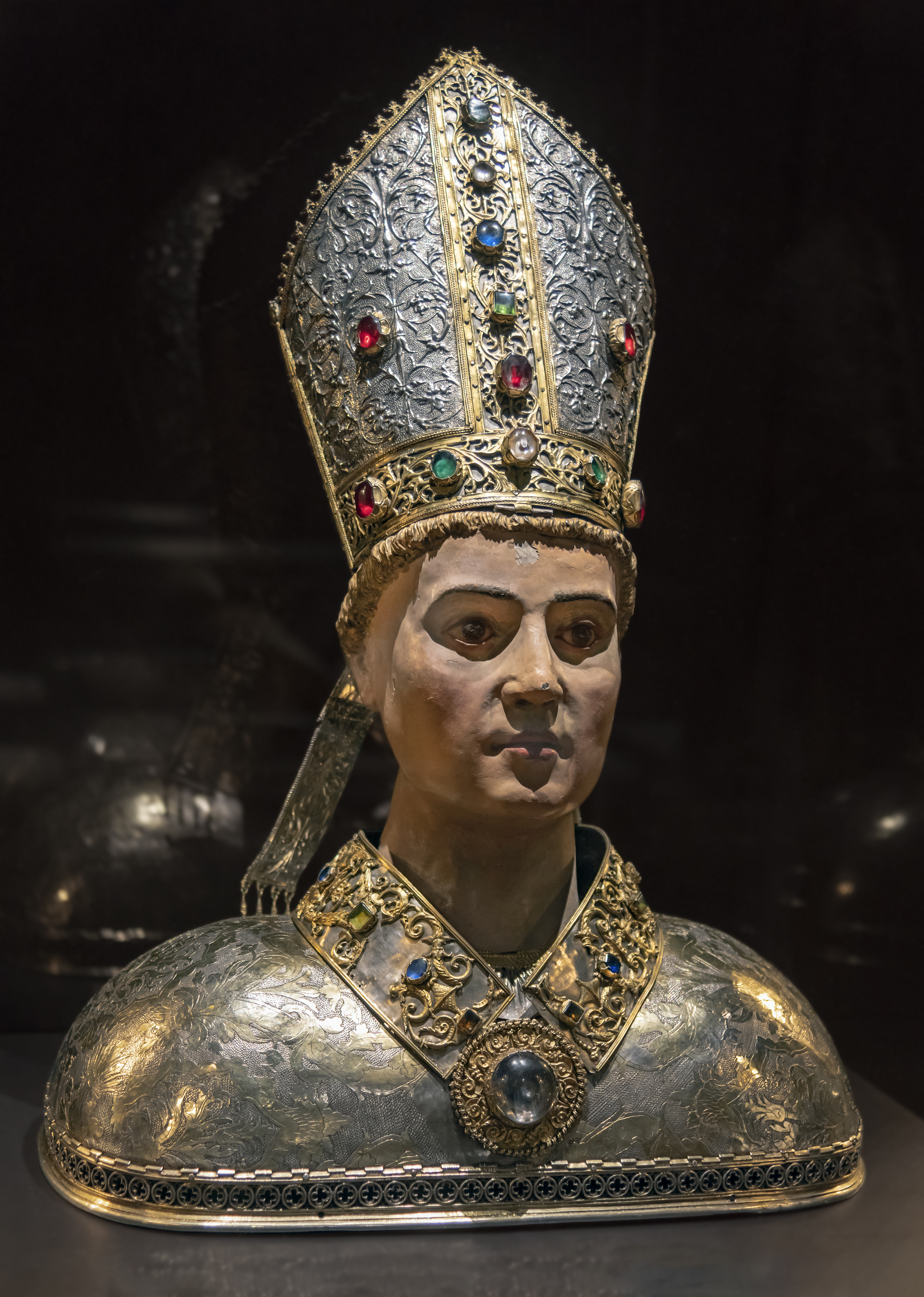
- Saint Lycerius Reliquary
- Died: 548; Couserans
- Venerated in: Roman Catholic Church

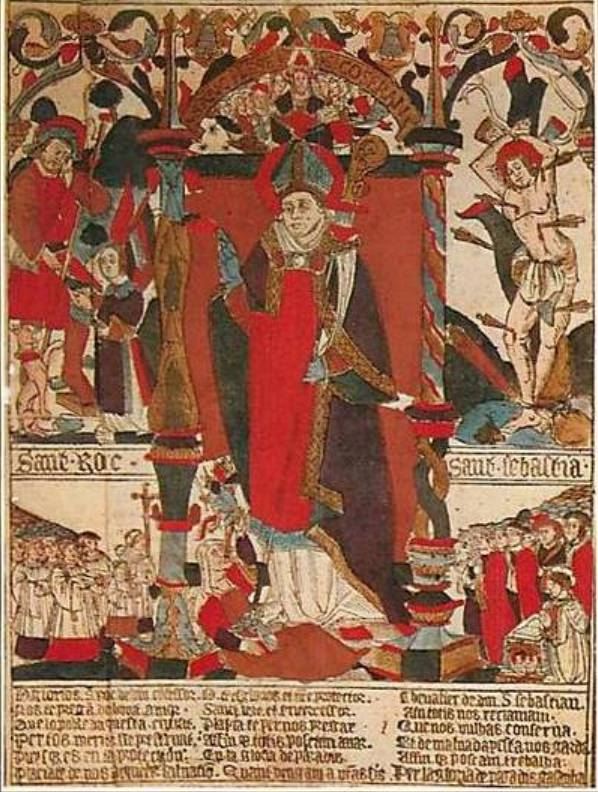
Saint Lycerius (middle) with Saint Roch and Saint Sebastian (holy card, 15th century).

Saint Lycerius (sometimes also Glycerius; French: Saint Lizier; Catalan: Sant Lliceri) (died 548) was a bishop of Couserans in the late 5th and 6th centuries.

Bishop Glycerius is recorded as having attended the Council of Agde in 506.

After his death in 548 he was buried in what is now Saint-Lizier Cathedral and honored as a saint. He is the patron of a number of places in south-western France, notably Saint-Lizier, which he is said to have saved from the Vandals. Saint-Lizier d'Ustou (Ariège); and Saint-Lizier-du-Planté (Gers) are also named for him. His feast day is 27 August.

Lycerius is also linked with Lleida (Lérida) in Catalonia, where there is a tradition (undocumented) of a bishop of the same name in the 3rd century. It is not clear to what extent the Catalan traditions reflect a confusion between two separate individuals, if indeed there is any foundation to them. In Lleida his feast is celebrated on 1 September. He is the secondary patron of Lleida, and the patron of Sant Antoni de Vilamajor.

According to tradition, which cannot be verified, he was a native of Civitas Bigorra, the present Saint-Lézer, near Tarbes. He studied with the bishop of Tarbes, and later with Quintí, bishop of Rodez, who ordained him priest. On account of the sanctity of his life, he was elected bishop of Couserans, and also administered the diocese of Tarbes during its vacancy from 506 to 541.

He is credited with many miracles of healing.

Lycerius is shown wearing bishop's robes standing between two bulls.

== See also ==
- Saint Glycerius
