= Council of Agde =

Synod held in the Septimania region of the Visigothic Kingdom (506 AD)

The Council of Agde was a regional synod of Western Rite Nicene bishops held in September 506 at Agatha or Agde, on the Mediterranean coast east of Narbonne, in the Septimania region of the Visigothic Kingdom, with the permission of the Visigothic King Alaric II, despite him being an Arian.

The Council met under the presidency of Bishop Caesarius of Arles. It was attended by 35 bishops:

- Caesarius of Arles
- Cyprianus of Bordeaux
- Clarus of Elusa
- Tetradius of Bourges
- Heraclianus of Toulouse
- Sophronius of Agde
- Sedatus of Nîmes
- Quintianus of Rodez
- Sabinus of Albi
- Boëtius of Cahors
- Gratianus of Aix
- Nicetius of Aux
- Suavis of Comminges
- Galactorius of Lescar
- Gratus of Oloron
- Vigilius of Lectoure
- Maternus of Lodève
- Petrus de Palatio
- Glycerius of Couserans
- Chronopius of Périgueux
- Probatius of Uzès
- Agroecius of Antibes
- Marcellus of Senez
- Pentadius of Digne
- Caprario of Narbonne‡
- Victorinus of Fréjus‡
- Aprus of Tarbes‡
- Euphrasius of Auvergne‡
- Julianus of Avignon‡
- Sextilius of Bazas‡
- Marcellus of Apt‡
- Pappolo‡
- Leonicus of Châlons-sur-Saône‡‡
- Verus of Tours‡‡

‡ represented by a priest.
‡‡ represented by a deacon.

The Council of Agde promulgated 47 canons on ecclesiastical discipline. In general, its canons shed light on the moral conditions of the clergy and laity in the historical region of Septimania at the beginning of the transition from Roman social order within the Roman province of Gallia Narbonensis to that of the Visigoth migrants. They are also of some importance for the study of certain early ecclesiastical institutions.

Its canon VII, forbidding ecclesiastics to sell or alienate the property of the church from which they drew their living, seems to be the earliest indication of the later system of benefices. In Canon IX, the Council ruled that if married deacons or priests wish to return to marital relations, they should be deprived of all of their ecclesiastical dignities and offices; those, however, who were unaware of the prohibition, could be allowed to retain their office if they abstain in the future. In Canon X, a cleric was forbidden to visit women to whom he was not related, and could have in his house only his mother, sister, daughter, or niece. A bishop was not to ordain anyone a deacon who was not yet twenty-five years old. In order to be ordained a priest or bishop, one had to be at least thirty years of age. If a young married man wished to be ordained, he required the consent of his wife (Canon XVI).

Marriage between cousins was also forbidden.

Also limitations on slavery were discussed.

== Books ==
- Halfond, Gregory I. (2010). Archaeology of Frankish Church Councils, AD 511–768. Boston-Leiden: Brill. pp. 185–188. ISBN 978-90-04-17976-9.
- Hefele, Carl Joseph (1895). A History of the Councils of the Church, from the Original Documents. By the Right Rev. Charles Joseph Hefele ... Vol. IV. A.D. 451 to A.D. 680. Edinburgh: T. & T. Clark.
- Klingshirn, William E. (2004). Caesarius of Arles: The Making of a Christian Community in Late Antique Gaul. Cambridge: Cambridge University Press. pp. 97–104. ISBN 978-0-521-52852-8.
- Maassen, Friedrich (1893). Concilia Aevi Merovingici: 511-695 (in German). Hannover: Impensis Bibliopolii Hahniani. ISBN 978-3-7752-5061-0.
- Mansi, J.-D. (ed.), Sacrorum Conciliorum nova et amplissima collectio editio novissima Tomus IX (Florence 1763).

=== Acknowledgment ===
- This article incorporates text from a publication now in the public domain: Shahan, Thomas (1907). "Council of Agde". In Herbermann, Charles (ed.). Catholic Encyclopedia. Vol. 1. New York: Robert Appleton Company.
