= Wetheman =

Danish noble

Wetheman or Vedeman (died c. 1170) was a Danish nobleman who in 1151 or 1152 founded a lay confraternity in Roskilde to help fight the pagan Wends. A layman, he was its first commander and led the defence of the coast from Wendish pirates. He also played a prominent role in the crusades and wars of King Valdemar I and Bishop Absalon of Roskilde. In 1164, the king put him in charge of the town of Wolgast after its capture.

Wetheman and his confraternity are known only from the chronicle of Saxo Grammaticus, who was writing around 1200. He appears to have had access to a copy of the confraternity's statutes. According to his paraphrase, all members of the confraternity were equal in status. Before battle, they made confession as if dying. On campaign, their behaviour was ascetic. They took little food and slept at their oars. If any Christian captives of the Wends were recovered on campaign, they were to be clothed and freed. They otherwise had the right to the booty, but if the city of Roskilde contributed to their funding the citizens had a right to half the booty. The confraternity apparently had the right to seize any ship as required so long as the owner was recompensed with an eighth of the booty. Saxo credits them with achieving many victories over numerically superior enemies while sustaining little or no loss.

Wetheman's confraternity may be compared to the earlier confraternity of Belchite in Spain for its confessional and crusading character. It may also have had some characteristics of a guild formed by the merchants of Roskilde for their protection or of a town militia. The movement later spread, picking up members among the rural population of Sjælland. Although it was apparently private organization, it took over the function normally fulfilled by the leding. Janus Møller Jensen credits its popularity and success to its religious character. It was "evidently sanctioned by the Church, but it may also have been licensed by the king."

== Bibliography ==
- Jensen, Janus Møller (2004). "Denmark and the Holy War: A Redefinition of a Traditional Pattern of Conflict in the Baltic in the Twelfth Century". In Jon Adams; Kathy Holman (eds.). Scandinavia and Europe, 800–1350: Contact, Conflict and Coexistence. Brepols. pp. 219–236.
- Jensen, Janus Møller (2006). "Wetheman (d. c. 1170)". In Alan V. Murray (ed.). The Crusades: An Encyclopedia. Vol. 4. ABC-CLIO. p. 1276.
- Saxo Grammaticus (2015). Karsten Friis-Jensen (ed.). Gesta Danorum: The History of the Danes. Vol. II. Translated by Peter Fisher. Clarendon Press.
