= Saint-Lizier =

Commune in Occitanie, France

- Commune
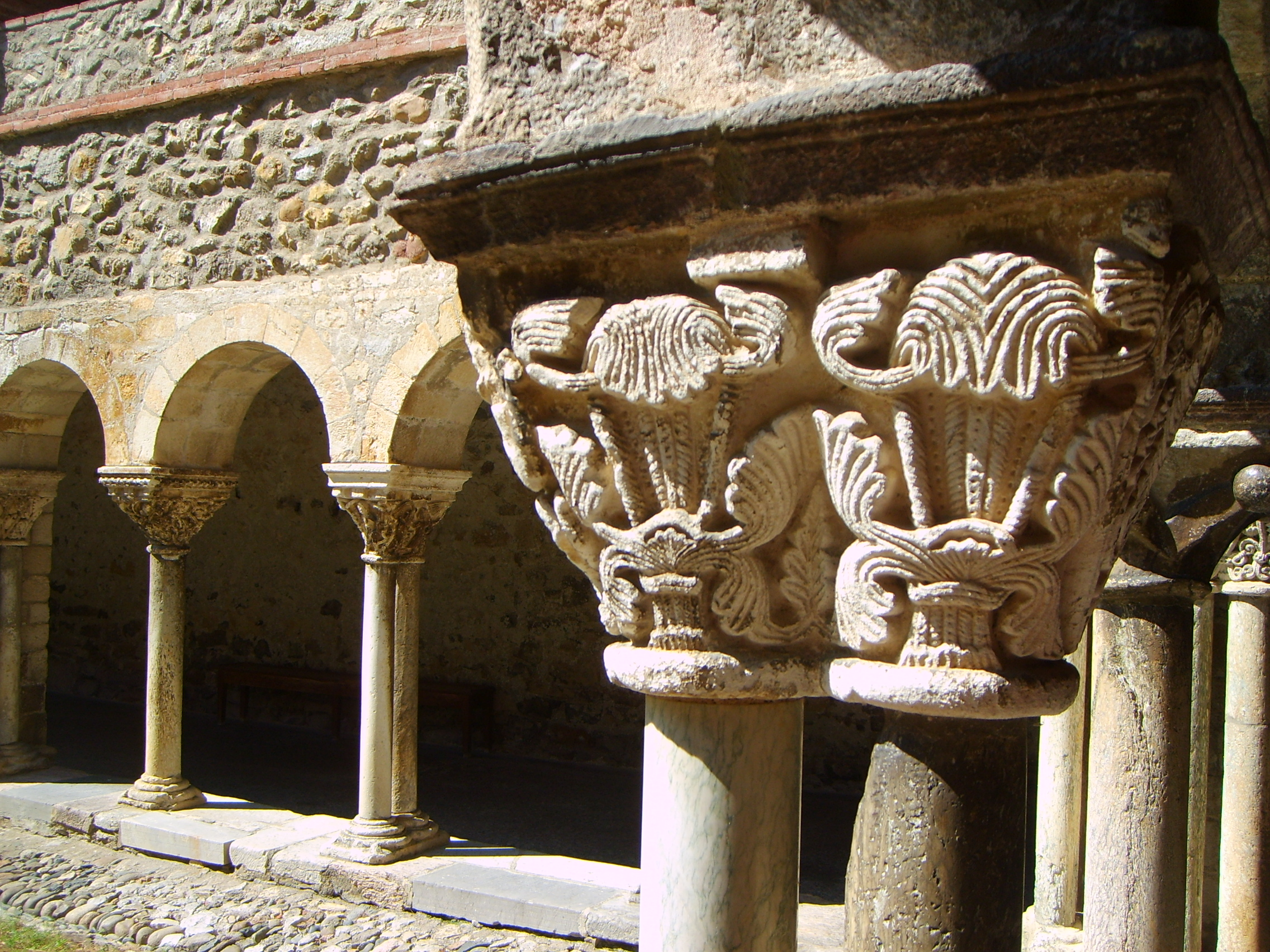
- Saint-Lizier cloister

- Coat of arms
- Location of Saint-Lizier
- Location within France Location within Occitanie
- Coordinates: 43°00′10″N 1°08′15″E
- Country: France
- Region: Occitania
- Department: Ariège
- Arrondissement: Saint-Girons
- Canton: Portes du Couserans
- Intercommunality: Couserans-Pyrénées

Government
  - Mayor (2020–2026): Michel Pichan
- Area^{1}: 9.01 km^{2} (3.48 sq mi)
- Elevation: 484 m (1,588 ft)
- Highest elevation: 578 m (1,896 ft)
- Lowest elevation: 368 m (1,207 ft)
- Population (2023): 1,391
  - Density: 154/km^{2} (400/sq mi)
- Time zone: UTC+01:00 (CET)
  - Summer (DST): UTC+02:00 (CEST)
- INSEE/Postal code: 09268 /09190
- ^{1} French Land Register data, which excludes lakes, ponds, glaciers > 1 km^{2} (0.386 sq mi or 247 acres) and river estuaries.

Saint-Lizier (French pronunciation: [sɛ̃ lizje]; Occitan: Sent Líser) is a commune in the Ariège department in southwestern France, situated on the river Salat.

== History ==
Saint-Lizier has a rich history stretching back to pre Gallo-Roman times. In 72 BC, Pompey, returning from his triumphs in Spain against Sertorius, stopped here. He gathered together the ancient tribes of the area under the name Consorani. The ramparts seen today date from 3rd century AD and enclose the oppidum.

During the fifth century, the citadel became an episcopal see, the oldest in the Ariège area. Its first bishop is thought to have been Saint Valier. The town is named in honor of its 6th Century bishop Lycerius, canonized as Saint Lizier, a bishop who participated in the Council of Agde in 506. The town has two former cathedrals: Saint-Lizier Cathedral (now the parish church) and Notre-Dame-de-la-Sède Cathedral.

== Population ==
Inhabitants of Saint-Lizier are called Licérois in French.

Historical population
| Year | Pop. | ±% p.a. |
|---|---|---|
| 1968 | 1,695 | — |
| 1975 | 1,719 | +0.20% |
| 1982 | 1,855 | +1.09% |
| 1990 | 1,646 | −1.48% |
| 1999 | 1,592 | −0.37% |
| 2007 | 1,457 | −1.10% |
| 2012 | 1,408 | −0.68% |
| 2017 | 1,418 | +0.14% |
| 2023 | 1,391 | −0.32% |
Source: INSEE

== Notable person ==
- The mathematician Alexander Grothendieck (1928–2014) died in Saint-Lizier

== See also ==
- Communes of the Ariège department
