= Lescar Cathedral =

Cathedral located in Pyrénées-Atlantiques, France

Coordinates: 43°19′58″N 0°26′0″W

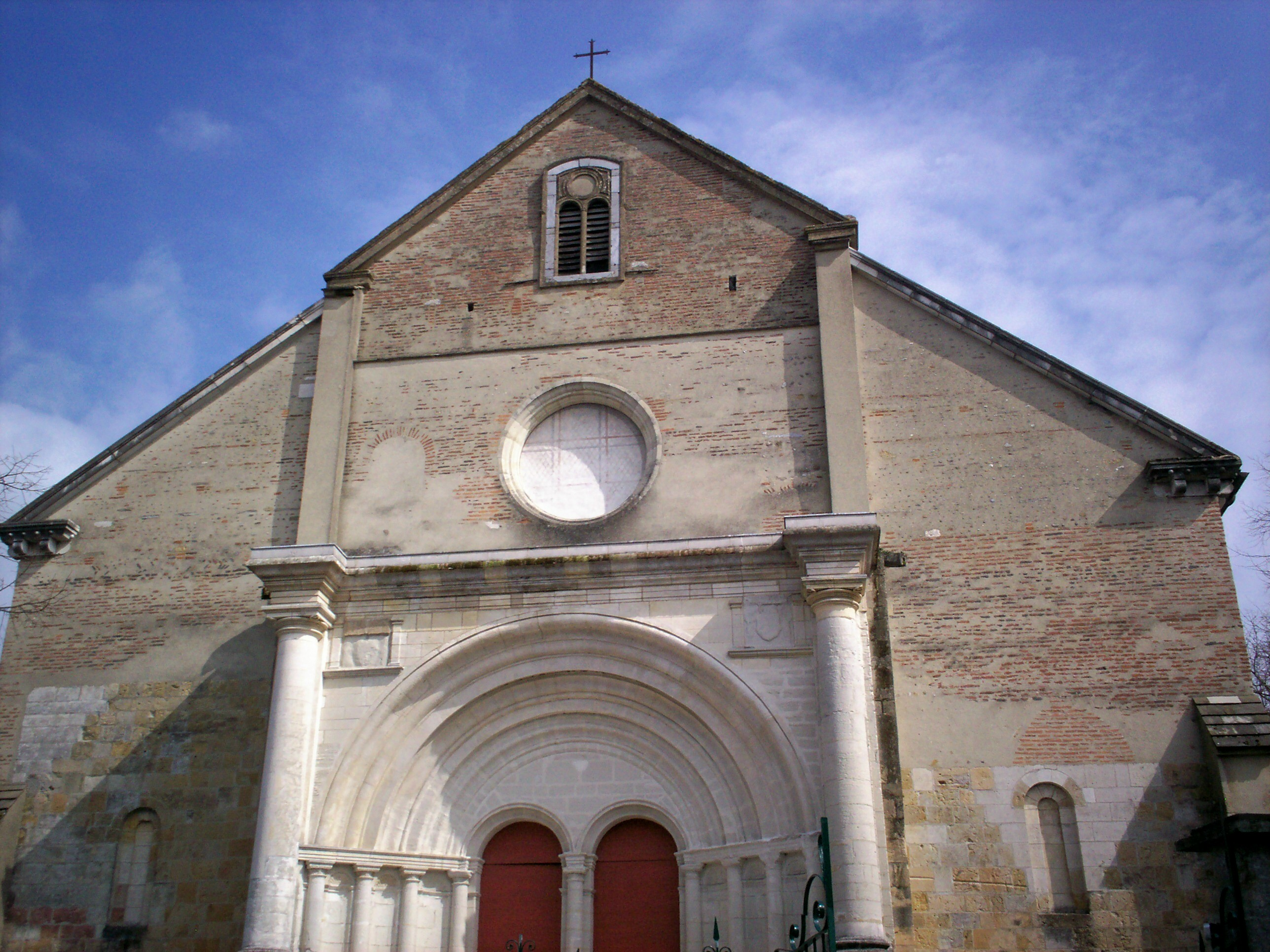
Lescar Cathedral west front

Lescar Cathedral (French: Cathédrale Notre-Dame-de-l'Assomption de Lescar) is a Roman Catholic church and former cathedral dedicated to the Assumption of the Virgin Mary. It is located in the town of Lescar, Pyrénées-Atlantiques, France. It has been listed since 1840 as a monument historique by the French Ministry of Culture.

It was formerly the seat of the Diocese of Lescar, suppressed under the Concordat of 1801 and divided between the dioceses of Agen and Bayonne.

== History and description ==
The building was begun in 1120 by Bishop Guy de Lons, and was sacked by the Protestants during the reign of Jeanne III of Navarre. It was restored in the 17th and 18th centuries. The apse, housing a pavement mosaic from the 12th century with hunting scenes, is in Romanesque style. In the interior, columns have capitals depicting histories of the life of Daniel, of the birth of Christ and the Sacrifice of Isaac.

== Royal burials ==
From the end of the 15th century the cathedral was used as the burial place of the royal family of Navarre. Francis Phoebus was buried here in 1483, followed by Catherine of Navarre, her consort Jean d'Albret and several of their children, among them Henry II of Navarre and his wife Marguerite de Navarre, grandparents of King Henry IV of France.

Of the funerary monuments ordered by Henry II, subjected to iconoclastic damage by Protestants and to the collapse of the sanctuary vault in 1599, nothing remains. Archaeological excavations in 1928-1929 were successful however in rediscovering the royal crypt and the remains of its occupants.

== Gallery ==
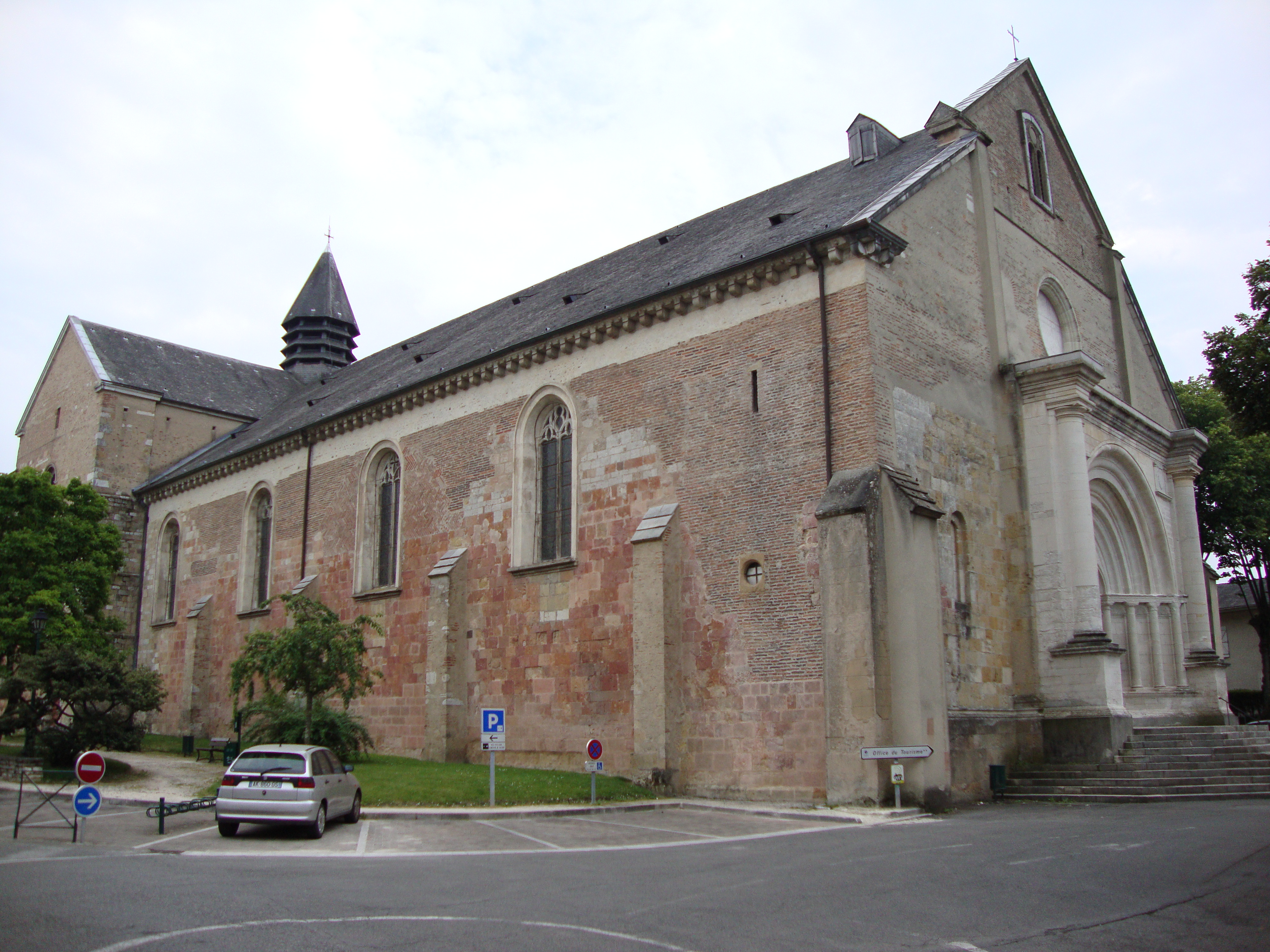
View from the north-west

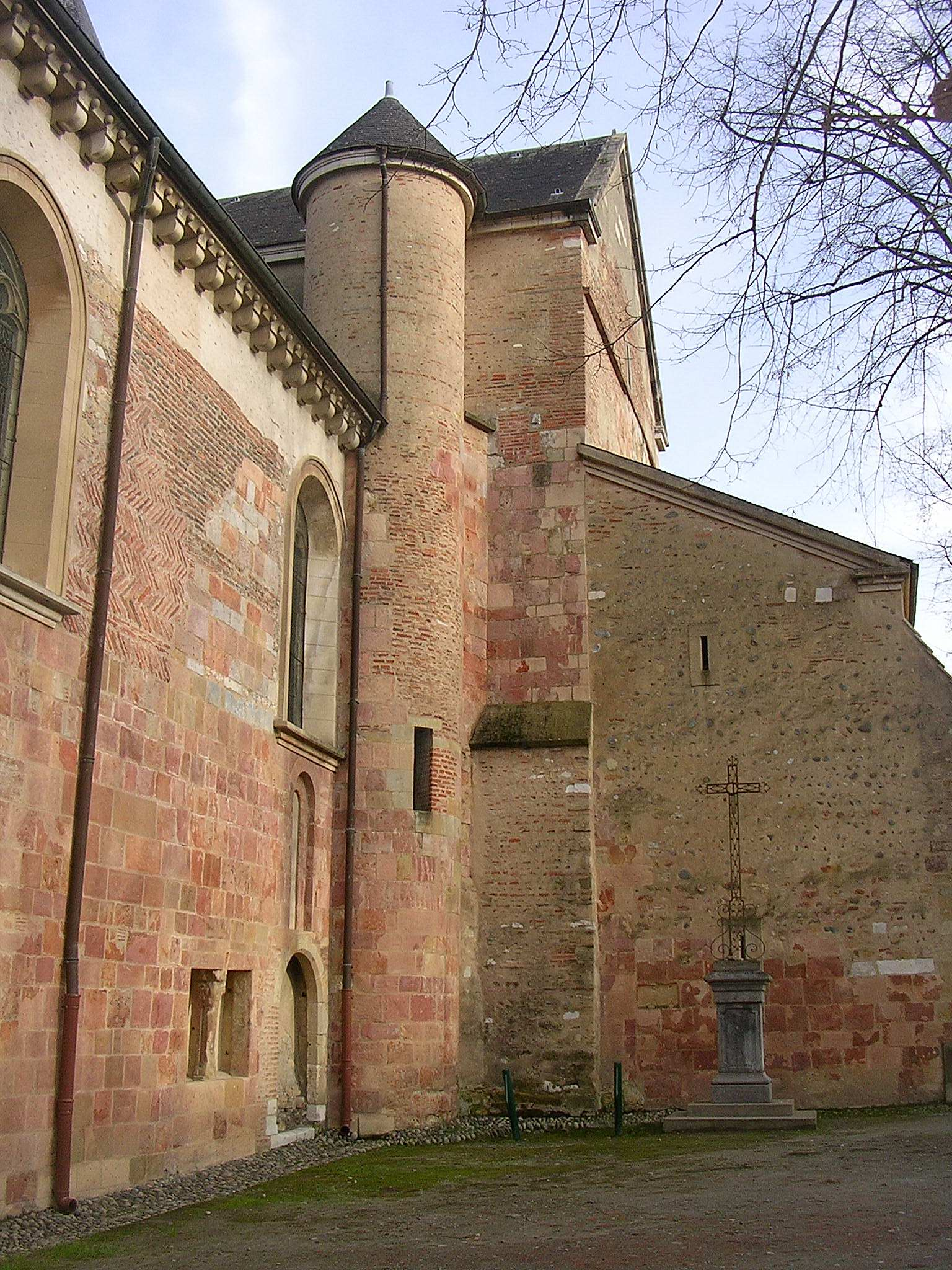
Side view

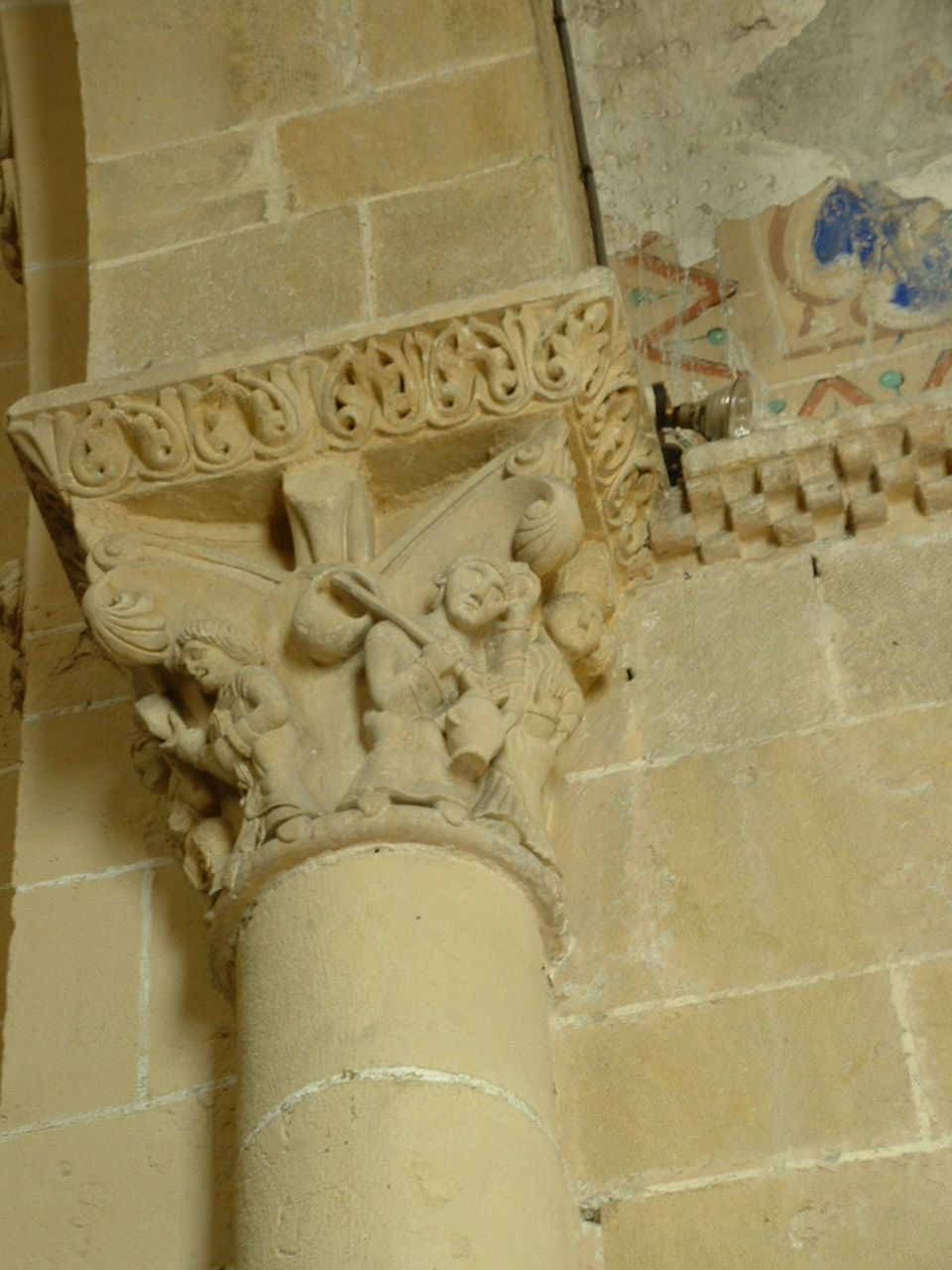
Capital

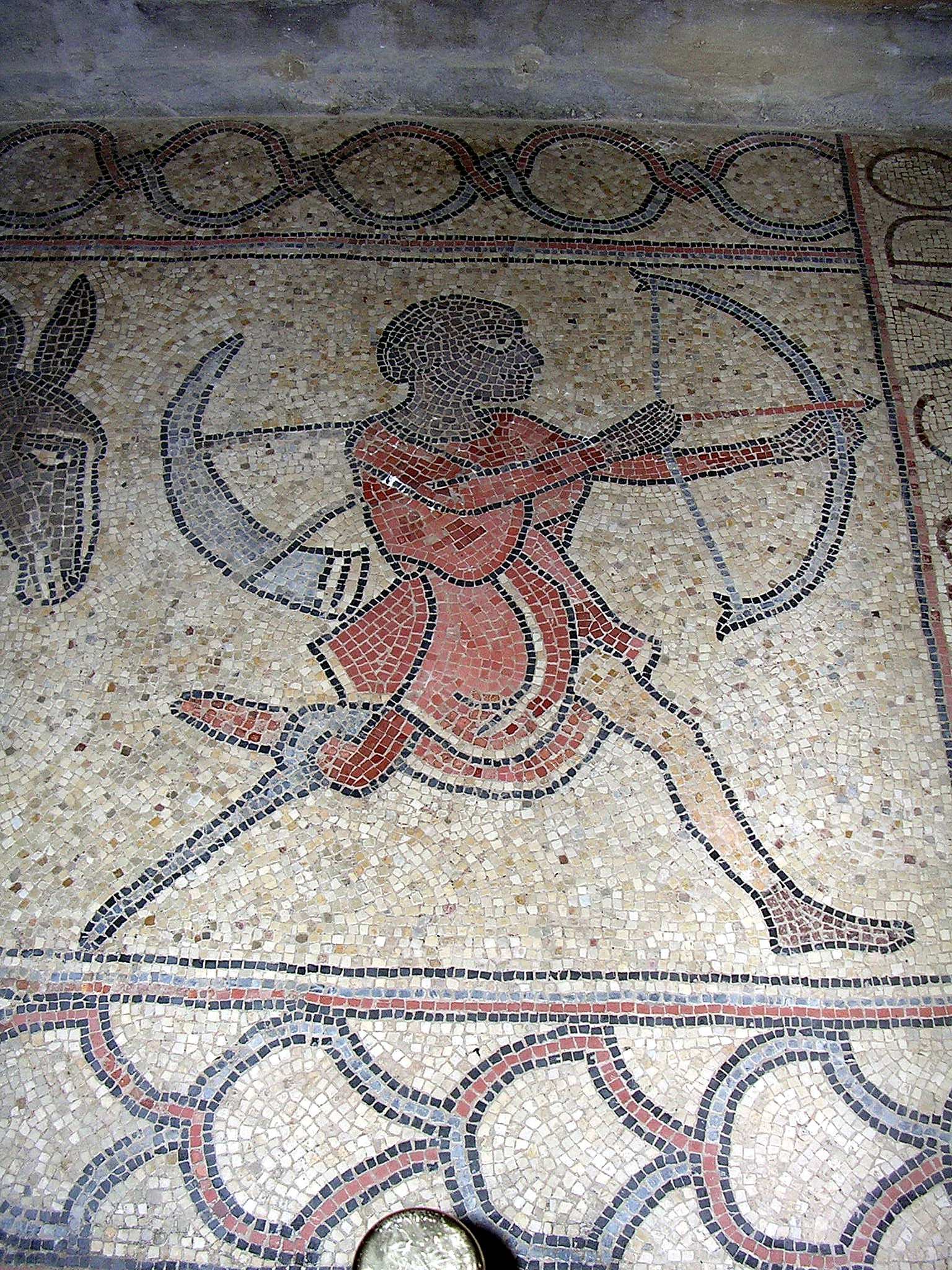
12th-century mosaic

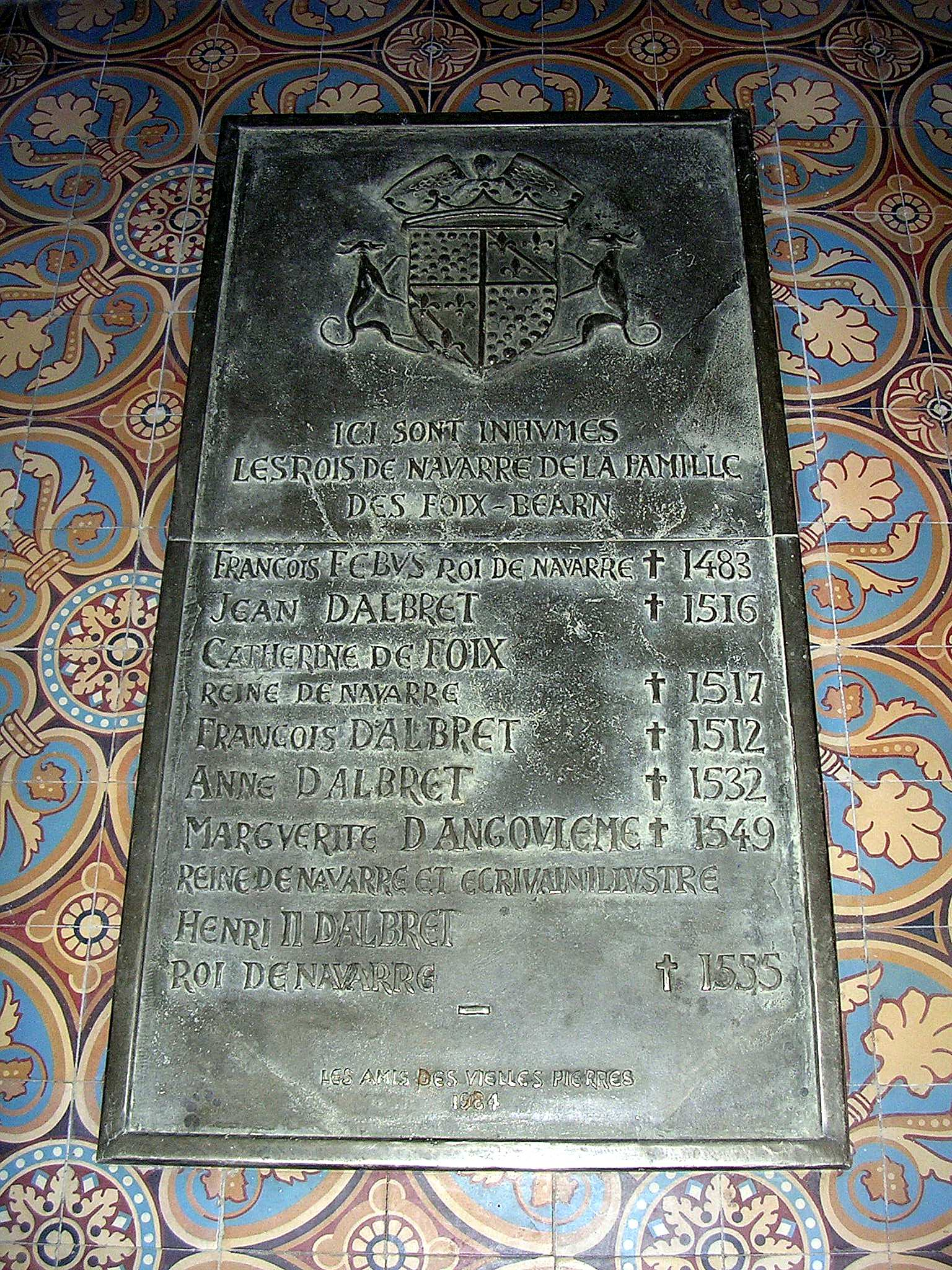
Tomb of the kings of Navarre

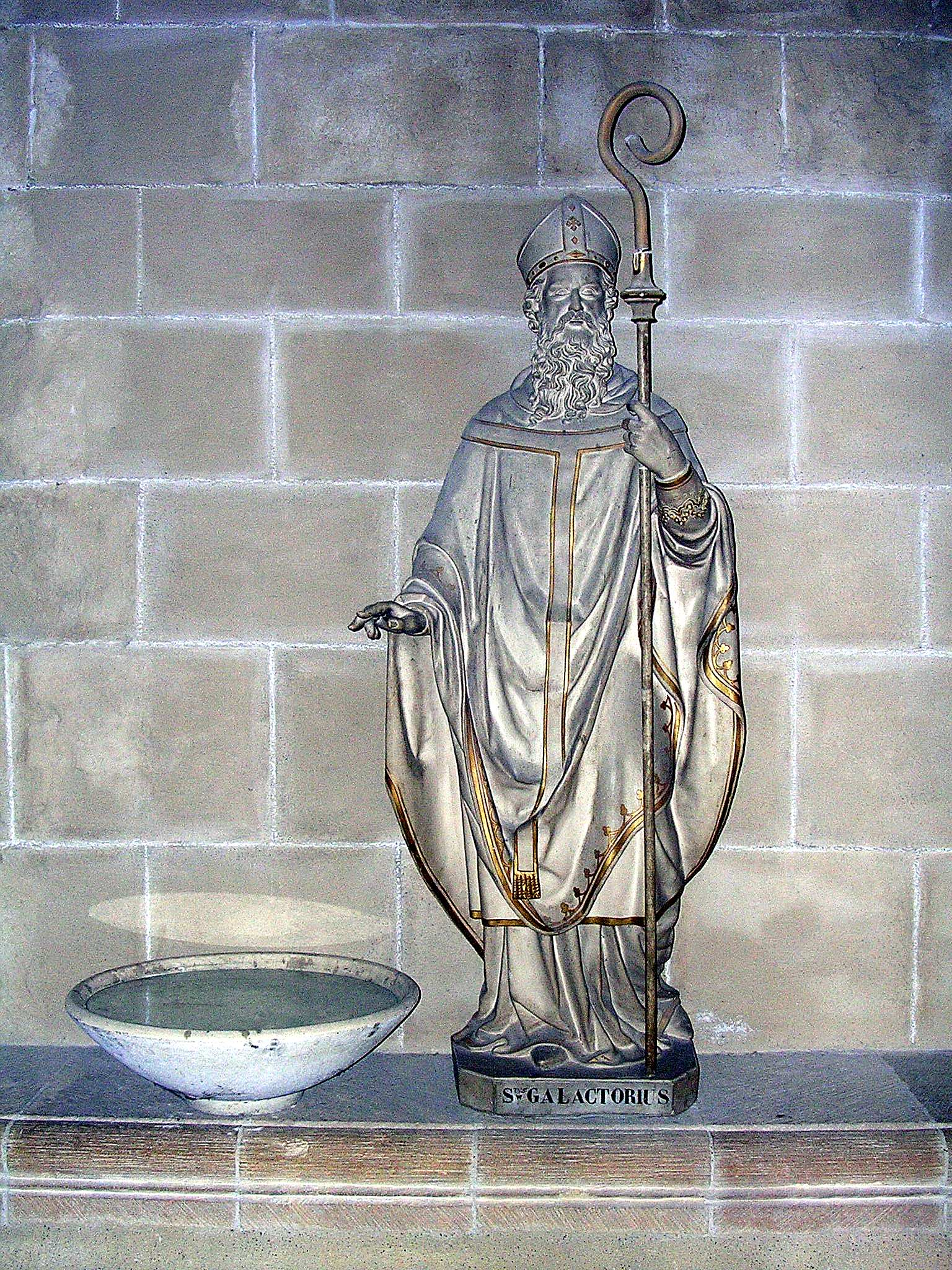
Statue of Saint Galactorius
