= Guy of Lescar =

Guy de Lons (died 1141), also known as Gui or Guido de Loth, was the Bishop of Lescar from 1115 to 1141. He made extensive travels in Spain on four occasions, three as Papal legate (1119, 1121 and 1138). He began construction on the extant Lescar Cathedral in 1120.

On his first legatine visit, Guy was present for the foundation of the Confraternity of Belchite by the Navarro-Aragonese king Alfonso the Battler. In 1134, Guy took part alongside Alfonso's forces in the Battle of Fraga, where he was captured by the Almoravids and imprisoned in Valencia. According to the contemporary Chronica Adefonsi imperatoris (I, §59), he was forced to pay 3,000 maravedíes to free himself, but according to another contemporary source, William of Malmesbury, he was liberated by the miraculous intercession of the Virgin Mary and Saint Ann, to whom he had been praying. This is an early connexion between Marian devotion and the Reconquista.

On 9 October 1138, Guy, acting as Papal legate again, confirmed, ahead of the local archbishop, Diego Gelmírez, the foundation of a nunnery at Genroso by the nobleman Bermudo Pérez de Traba. Guy placed his own autograph at the bottom of the document, next to the text: "I, Guy, bishop of the church of Lescar, praise and confirm this above written page for the honour of God and the Holy Virgin and for the perpetual sustenance of the other servants of God, and legate of Rome I make this sign [signature follows]." On this same legatine mission, Guy also conveyed a summons to Diego to attend the Second Lateran Council in 1139. The Historia compostellana, a contemporary account of Diego's episcopate, portrays Guy as the archbishop's ally in his conflicts with the saecular powers of Spain.
