= Confraternity of Belchite =

Military order of knights founded by Alfonso the Battler in 1122

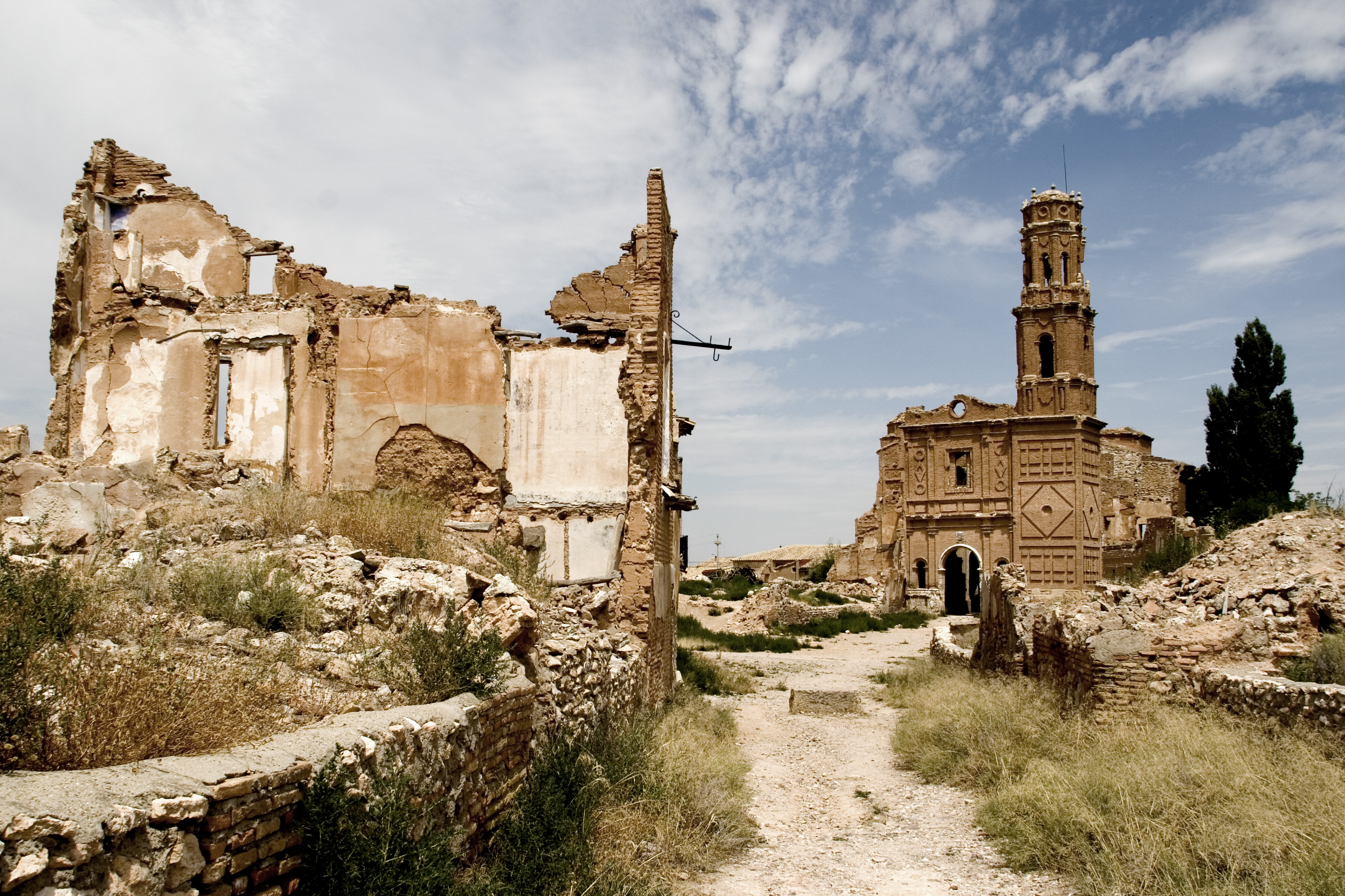
Today Belchite lies in ruins, a casualty of the civil war

The Confraternity of Belchite was a military order established in Belchite by Alfonso the Battler in 1122. Its purpose was to defend the Aragon's Kingdom southern frontier and to foster the crusade against the Muslims, the advance of the Christian Reconquista, and the consolidation of newly settled lands through the fortification and repopulation of sites captured from Islamic control. Membership was open to both laypeople and members of the clergy. It was led by Galindo Sánchez until 1126, and Lope Sánchez served as its Grand Master between 1128 and 1147. Members could enlist permanently or for a set time, vowing "never to live at peace with the pagans but to devote all their days to molesting and fighting them". When Alfonso VII of Leon confirmed the charter of the confraternity, he specified that it existed "for the defence of Christians and the oppression of Saracens". A Christian organisation dedicated to a holy war against Muslims (reconquista), its impetus and development coincide with that of the international military orders and it introduced the concept of an indulgence proportional to length of service.

The confraternity may have used a palm tree as its emblem. The contemporary historian Orderic Vitalis called them Fratres de Palmis, 'brothers of the palm'.

== History ==
In 1117 Alfonso the Battler conquered the town of Belchite, about twenty-two miles southeast of his main target, the city of Zaragoza, which surrendered on 18 December 1118. The following years were spent consolidating these gains, and it was not until 1122 that Alfonso established a confraternity of knights in Belchite. He may have "envisioned international crusading movement based on military orders", as Peter Schickl suggested and Alfonso's will may attest. The foundation charter of the confraternity does not survive, but that of the similar Order of Monreal, founded by Alfonso in 1128, does. We know that the foundation charter of Belchite was witnessed by the most powerful bishops from throughout Spain: Bernard de Sedirac, Oleguer Bonestruga, Diego Gelmírez and Guy de Lescar.

José Lacarra (1971) speculated that the confraternity was merged into the Templar organisation, but there is no evidence of its continuance beyond 1136. More probably it had collapsed by the time of Alfonso the Battler's will (1134), leaving its confirmation charter of 1136 as a political ploy in the haggling over the succession in Aragon. In 1143 a settlement was reached in which Raymond Berengar IV of Barcelona gave the castle at Belchite to the Templars "according as [they could] best come to terms" with its lord, Lope Sanz (Sánchez), who was the princeps and rector of the confraternity in 1136.

== Organisation ==
The confraternity was to have its headquarters either at Belchite or any other suitable fortress in the frontier beyond Zaragoza. It was granted all booty it could seize from the Muslims and exempted from the quinta, the fifth of the booty traditionally owed to the sovereign. It was permitted to colonise any depopulated lands, but all its property was held per deum (of God) and inde deo serviant (for serving God). It elected its own leader, titled princeps or rector, and it employed two merchants exempted from all customs and tolls. Furthermore, the members were permitted to judge cases brought by outsiders against any member.

On 4 October 1136 a synod convened by Alfonso VII sat in Burgos and, at his request, granted an indulgence for those lent support to Belchite. Present were three archbishops—Raymond de Sauvetât, Diego Gelmírez, Paio Mendes—twenty bishops, nine abbots and the Papal legate Guido Pisano. The support that qualified could be permanent or temporary membership, or a donation, and the indulgence applied everybody both lay and religious. The equating of reconquista with crusade was based on the idea of opening a route to Jerusalem through Spain and North Africa. Likewise the Confraternity of Belchite is explicitly compared to the Hospitallers and the Templars, and the indulgence to that granted for the 1113–15 Balearic Islands expedition and the 1118–20 conquest of Zaragoza:

Let he who wishes to serve God [in Belchite] for a year gain the same remission as if he went to Jerusalem. . . If any knight or anyone else, living or dead, should leave his horse or arms for the service of God [in Belchite], let him have the same indulgence as he who has bequeathed them to the Hospital of Jerusalem or the Temple. . . Therefore, dearest brothers, make haste toward the great joy of this indulgence with an eager spirit[.] [B]y the same indulgence the tomb of the Lord [sepulcrum Domini] was delivered from captivity, as were Mallorca and Zaragoza and other places, and likewise, by the favour of God, the road to Jerusalem [iter Hierosolymitanum] from this region [pars] will be opened [aperietur] and the Church of God, which is held there as a slave in captivity, will be liberated.

Much of the language of the indulgence is borrowed from the speech made by Diego Gelmírez at the Council of Compostela (1125), the only other instance of such an indulgence being issued by a Spanish ecclesiastic and not by a pope in the twelfth century. This strongly suggests that Diego was influential in writing up the indulgence of 1136.

The confraternity of Belchite has been compared to the Danish confraternity founded around 1151 by Wetheman. Both represented a local application of the new crusading ideology.

== Influence of the ribāṭ ==
The Spanish orientalist José Antonio Conde was the first to propose a connexion between the military orders and the Islamic ribāṭ:

It seems highly probable that from these rábitos developed, both in Spain and among the Christians in the East, the idea of the military orders, so distinguished for their valour and the outstanding services which they rendered to Christianity. Both institutions were very similar.

In his work on Spanish historiography (1954), Américo Castro also "proposes that the medieval Christian military orders of fighting religious men were modeled on the Islamic ribāṭ." His proposal was rejected for lack of positive evidence by Joseph O'Callaghan (1959), before being taken up by Thomas Glick and Oriol Pi-Sunyer as a textbook example medieval acculturation through stimulus- or idea-diffusion:

Many an alien institution which is basically attractive may be unacceptable in its original form. But it may act as a stimulus to a reinvention within the confines of the recipient culture of a similar institution consonant with the values of the recipient. The ribāṭ was attractive to the Christians and fulfilled a social and military need but was unacceptable owing to Spanish religious values. For the Christians it would have been thoroughly repugnant to take on the trappings of that very religion whose extermination was life's highest goal. Nevertheless we may posit that the Islamic concept acted as a stimulus towards the reinvention of the ribāṭ in completely Christian guise. In such a case, moreover, the anthropologist would expect precisely not to find that document institutional continuity upon which the medievalists so depend.

Elena Lourie argues that the notion of temporary service, so alien to Christian idea of vocation, yet central to the nucleus of the rule of Belchite of 1122 (preserved in the re-issue of 1136, with changes) could only have come from the Islamic ribāṭ. Already the confirmation charter of 1136 shows a shift in emphasis towards the permanent members, and the difference in rank between permanent and temporary members of the Templars shows, Lourie argues, that the one is further from any Islamic source and closer to Christian monastic tradition. Belchite is a "half-way house" between municipal fraternities, the monastic orders and the ribāṭ. She goes on to quote the objection of O'Callaghan why "[i]f the ribāṭ with its complement of warrior-ascetics existed in Spain for centuries ... the first Spanish military order [the Order of Calatrava] was not founded before 1158?" According to Jesuit historian Robert Ignatius Burns, borrowing from a position of strength, which the Christians of Iberia attained only by the mid-eleventh century, is preferred to borrowing from weakness.

== Bibliography ==
- Brodman, James W., trans. "Indulgences for the Confraternity of Belchite (1136)." American Academy of Research Historians of Medieval Spain (2005). Online
- Castro, Américo. The Structure of Spanish History. Princeton: Princeton University Press, 1954.
- Crespo Vicente, Pascual. "La Militia Christi de Monreal y el origen de las órdenes militares en España." Xiloca: revista del Centro de Estudios del Jiloca, 35 (2007), 203–28. PDF
- Fletcher, Richard A. The Episcopate in the Kingdom of León in the Twelfth Century. Oxford: Oxford University Press, 1978. Online
- Fletcher, Richard A. "Reconquest and Crusade in Spain, c. 1050–1150." Transactions of the Royal Historical Society, Fifth Series, 37 (1987), 31–47.
- Forey, Alan John. The Templars in the Corona de Aragón. University of Durham, 1973. Online
- Glick, Thomas F. and Oriol Pi-Sunyer. "Acculturation as an Explanatory Concept in Spanish History." Comparative Studies in Society and History, 11:2 (1969), 136–54.
- Goñi Gaztambide, J. Historia de la Bula de Cruzada en España. Vitoria: 1958.
- Jensen, Janus Møller (2006). "Wetheman (d. c. 1170)". In Alan V. Murray (ed.). The Crusades: An Encyclopedia. 4 vols. ABC-CLIO. vol. 4, p. 1276.
- Kantorowicz, Ernst Hartwig. "Pro Patria Mori in Medieval Political Thought." The American Historical Review, 53:3 (1951), 472–92.
- Lacarra, José María. Vida de Alfonso el Batallador. Zaragoza: 1971.
- Linage Conde, Antonio. "Tipología de la vida religiosa en las Órdenes militares." Anuario de estudios medievales, 11 (1981), 33–58.
- Lourie, Elena. "The Confraternity of Belchite, the Ribat, and the Temple." Viator, 13 (1982), 159–76.
- Maravall, José Antonio. "La idea de Reconquista en la España medieval." Arbor, 28:101 (1954), 1–37.
- McCrank, Lawrence J. "The Foundation of the Confraternity of Tarragona by Archbishop Oleguer Bonestruga." Viator, 9 (1978), 157–77.
- O'Banion, Patrick J. "What has Iberia to do with Jerusalem? Crusade and the Spanish Route to the Holy Land in the Twelfth Century." Journal of Medieval History, 34 (2008), 383–95.
- O'Callaghan, Joseph. "The Affiliation of the Order of Calatrava with the Order of Cîteaux." Analecta Sacra Ordinis Cisterciensis, 15 (1959).
- Pallarés Gil, M. "La frontera sarracena en tiempo de Berenguer IV." Boletín de historia y geografía del Bajo-Aragón, 1 (1907).
- Rassow, Peter. "La cofradía de Belchite." Anuario de historia del derecho español, 3 (1926), 200–26.
- Reilly, Bernard F. The Kingdom of León-Castilla under Queen Urraca, 1109–1126. Princeton: Princeton University Press, 1982. Online
- Schickl, Peter. "Die Entstehung und Entwicklung des Templerordens in Katalonien und Aragon." Gesammelte Aufsätze zur Kulturgeschichte Spaniens, 28 (1975), 91–228.
- Ubieto Arteta, Antonio. "La creación de la cofradía militar de Belchite." Estudios de Edad Media de la Corona de Aragón, 5 (1952), 427–34.
- Wilson, Jonathan. "Tactics of Attraction: Saints, Pilgrims and Warriors in the Portuguese Reconquista." Portuguese Studies, 30:2 (2014), 204–221.
