= Galactorius of Lescar =

Bishop of Lescar

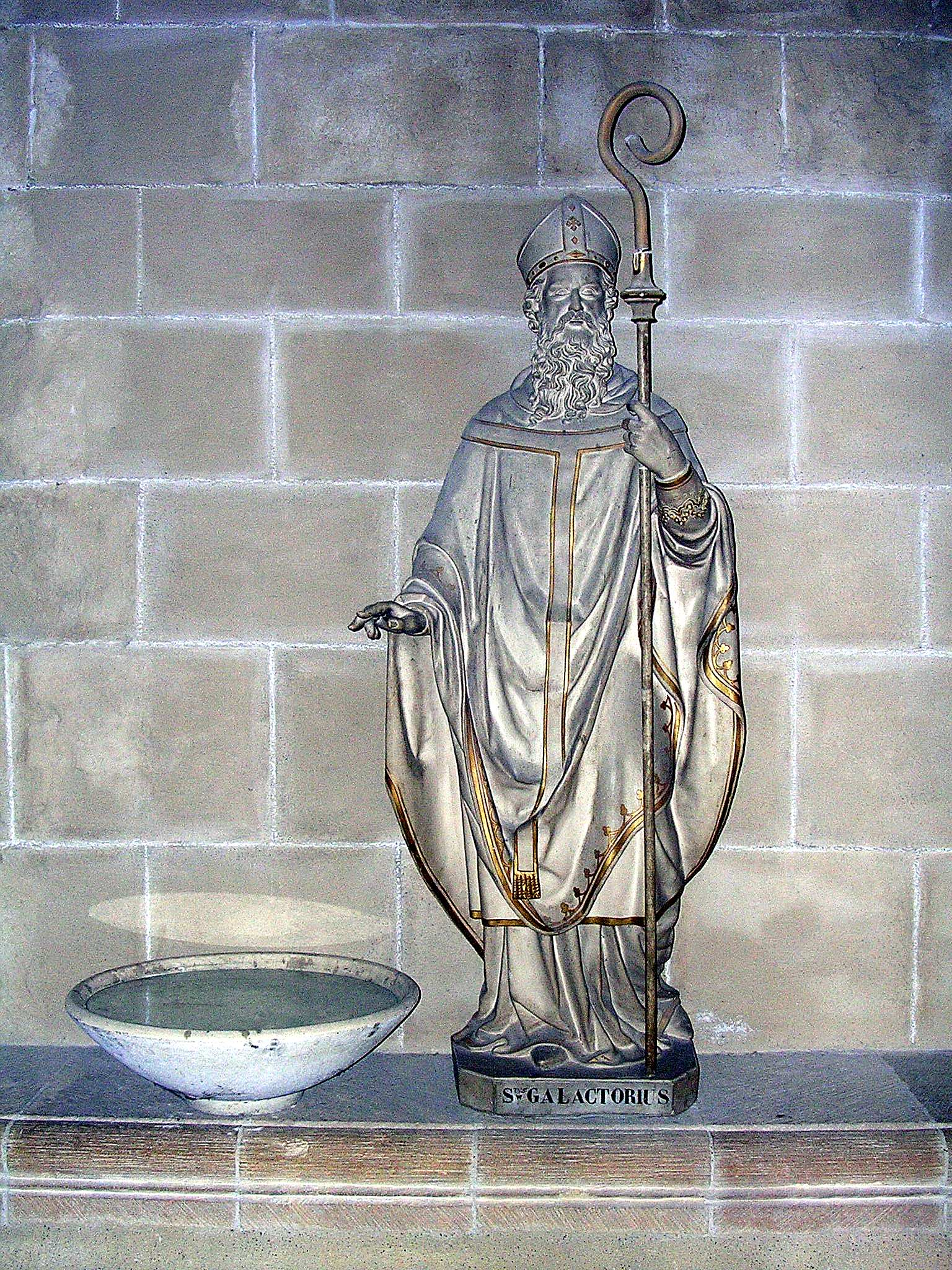
Statue of Saint Galactorius in Lescar Cathedral

Saint Galactorius (French: Saint Galactoire) was a bishop of Lescar in the early 6th century. His feast is celebrated on 27 July.

== Life ==
Galactorius took part in 506 in the Council of Agde, when he was described as "Galactorius, episcopus de Benarno", along with the bishops Saint Gratus of Oloron and Gratianus of Dax, as well as several delegates of the bishops of Tarbes and of Aire. His tenure as bishop is attested and it is known that his diocese was well administered.

=== Legend ===
The legend, told in the breviary of Lescar, printed in 1541, portrays Galactorius fighting the Visigoths at Mimizan in 506 at the head of an armed band and seeking help from Clovis. Taken prisoner, he is said to have met a martyr's death, refusing to abjure his Roman Catholic faith. A religious building is said to have been raised in his honour on the site, later replaced by the belltower of the church of Mimizan.

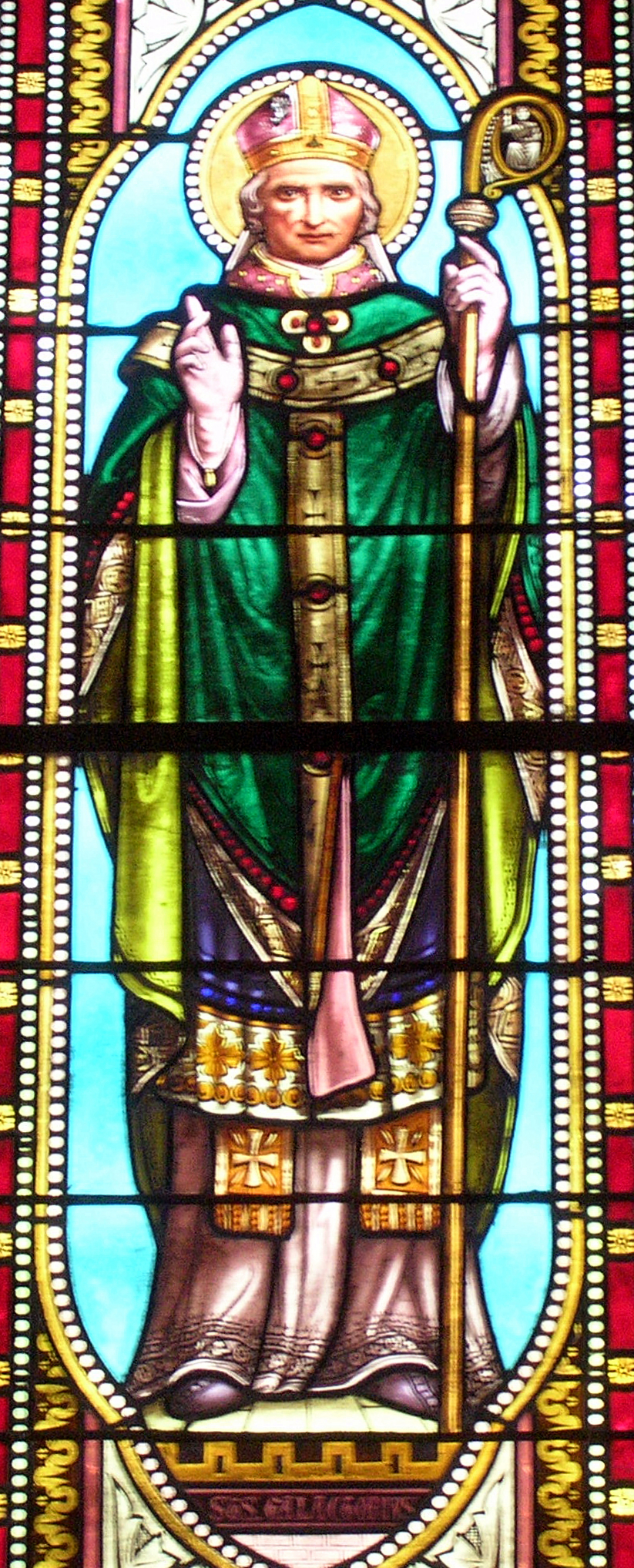
Stained glass window of Saint Galactorius in the church of Mimizan

=== Interpretation ===
It is difficult to conceive of the bishop, despite his possible sympathy with Clovis, taking arms in 506 against Alaric II, who had just given evidence of his tolerance for Roman Catholics by authorising them to hold a council. It is more likely that Galactorius was at Mimizan towards 507 to meet the bishop of Bordeaux and was surprised by Visigoth troops retreating towards the Pyrenees after having been routed at the Battle of Vouillé by the Frankish army. Doubtless humiliated by their defeat, hostile to Roman Catholics and eager for vengeance, such a group would easily have put to death the Catholic bishop of Lescar.

=== Relics ===
The relics of Galactorius were preserved until the Reformation in a casket beneath the high altar of Lescar Cathedral. It is unknown when, and how, they disappeared.
