= Diocese of Lescar =

Coordinates: 43.3331°N 0.4339°W

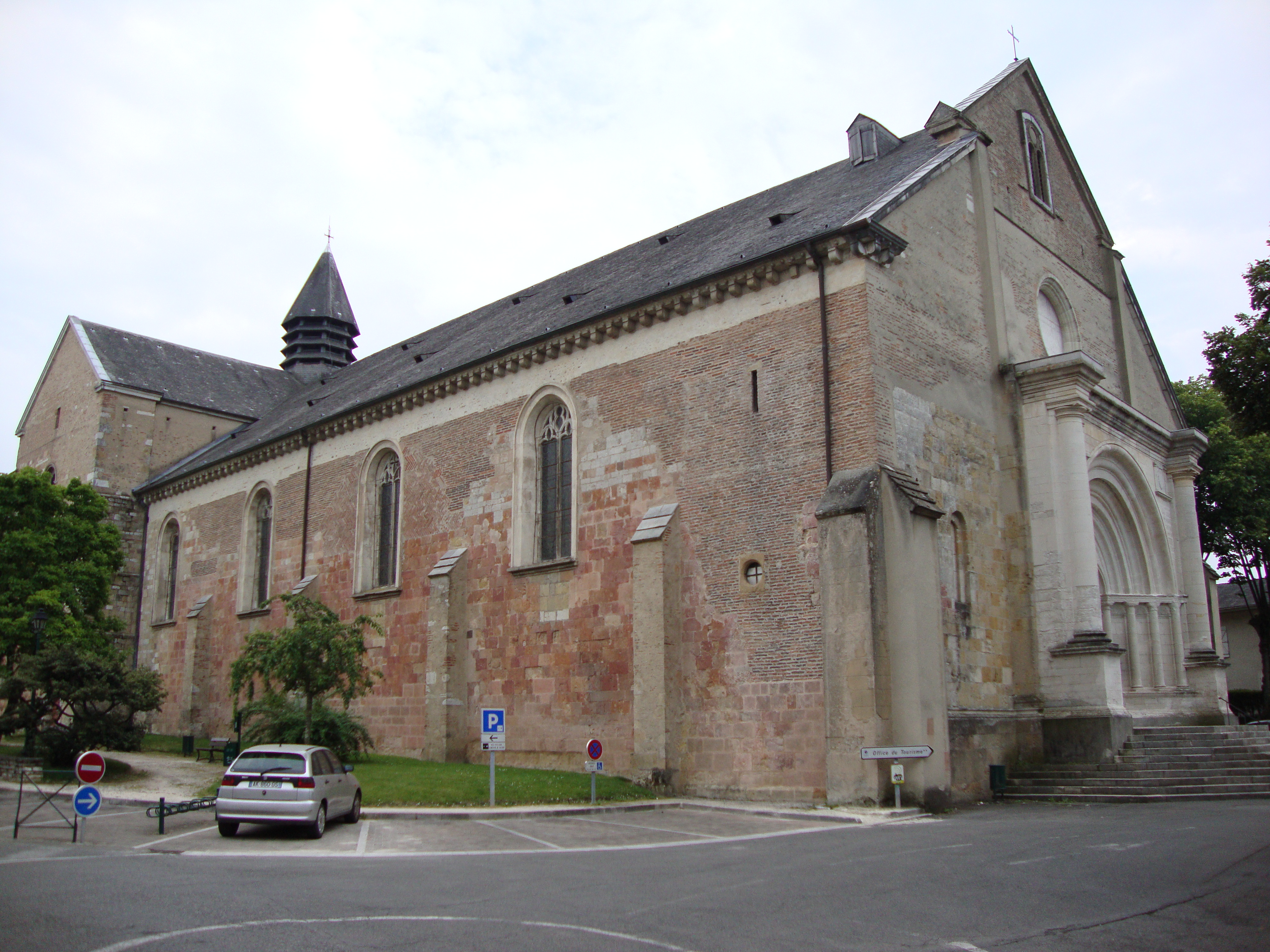
Lescar Cathedral

The Roman Catholic Diocese of Lescar (Latin: Dioecesis Lascurrensis; French: Diocèse de Lescar; Basque: Leskarreko elizbarrutia), in south-western France, was founded in the fifth century, and continued until 1790. It was originally part of the Province of Novempopulania, and Lescar held the seventh place among the cities. Its see was the Cathedral of the Assumption in Lescar, begun in 1120; the crypt of the cathedral was also the mausoleum of the family of Albret in the 16th century.

The bishopric was suppressed by the Legislative Assembly during the French Revolution, in the Civil Constitution of the Clergy in September 1790, as part of a systematic effort to eliminate redundant bishoprics in France. By the Concordat of 1801, struck by First Consul Napoleon Bonaparte and Pope Pius VII, the diocese of Lescar was not revived, and the territory of the diocese was divided between the diocese of Agen and the diocese of Bayonne.

== Bishops of Lescar ==
=== to 1200 ===
- ? c. 506: Saint Julien I.
- c. 506?: Galactorius of Lescar
- c. 585: Sabinus or Savin
- c. 680: Julien II.
- c. 731: Julien III.
- c. 841: Spaleus
- 841–1059: Vacant
- c. 1059: Raymond I. le Vieux
- 1061–1072: Gregor
- 1075–1080: Bernard I.
- 1095–1115: Sanche I.
- 1115–1141: Gui or Guido de Loth (Guy de Lons)
- 1147–1154: Raymond II. d'Assade
- c. 1168: Eudes I. or Odon
- c. 1170: Guillaume I.
- c. 1180: Sanche II. Aner or Sanzanier de Gerderest

=== 1200 to 1400 ===
- c. 1200: Bertrand I.
- 1205–1213: Arsias
- c. 1220: Raymond III. de Bénac
- c. 1231: Sanctius
- 1247–1268: Bertrand II. de La Mothe
- 1269–1292: Arnaud I. de Morlanne (or de Morlaas)
- 1293–1301: Raymond IV. Auger
- 1303–1320: Arnaud II. d'Arbus
- 1320–1321: Guillaume II.
- 1321–1325: Arnaud III. de Saut
- 1326–1348: Raymond V. d'Andoins
- 1348–1352: Arnaud IV.
- 1352–1361: Guillaume III. d'Andoins
- 1362–1368: Bernard II.
- 1368–1401: Eudes II.

=== 1400 to 1600 ===
- 1402–1404: Jean I. (Avignon Obedience)
- 1405–1422: Cardinal Pierre de Foix (Appointed by Alexander V)
- 1425–1428: Arnaud V. de Salies or Salinis
- 1428–1433: Arnaud VI. d'Abadie
- 1453–1460: Pierre II. de Foix
- 1460–1475: Jean II. de Lévis
- 1481–1492: Robert d'Épinay
- 1513–1515: Cardinal Amanieu d'Albret
- 1518–1525: Jean III. de La Salle
- 1525–1530: Paul de Béarn (or de Foix)
- 1532–1553: Jacques de Foix
- 1554–1555: Jean IV. de Capdeville
- 1555: Cardinal Georges d'Armagnac, Administrator
- 1555–1569: Louis d'Albret
- 1575–1590: Jean V.

=== 1600 to 1800 ===
- 1600–1609: Jean-Pierre d'Abadie
- 1609–1632: Jean VI. de Salettes
- 1632–1658: Jean-Henri de Salettes
- 1658–1681: Jean VII. du Haut de Salies
- 1681–1716: Dominique Deslaux de Mesplès
- 1716–1729: Martin de Lacassaigne
- 1730–1762: Hardouin de Châlons
- 1763–1790 (1801): Marc-Antoine de Noé

== See also ==
- Catholic Church in France
- List of Catholic dioceses in France

== Bibliography ==
=== Reference books ===
- Gams, Pius Bonifatius (1873). Series episcoporum Ecclesiae catholicae: quotquot innotuerunt a beato Petro apostolo. Ratisbon: Typis et Sumptibus Georgii Josephi Manz. pp. 563–564. (Use with caution; obsolete)
- Eubel, Conradus, ed. (1913). Hierarchia catholica, Tomus 1 (second ed.). Münster: Libreria Regensbergiana. p. 295. (in Latin)
- Eubel, Conradus, ed. (1914). Hierarchia catholica, Tomus 2 (second ed.). Münster: Libreria Regensbergiana. p. 173.
- Gulik, Guilelmus (1923). Eubel, Conradus (ed.). Hierarchia catholica, Tomus 3 (second ed.). Münster: Libreria Regensbergiana. pp. 219–220.
- Gauchat, Patritius (Patrice) (1935). Hierarchia catholica IV (1592-1667). Münster: Libraria Regensbergiana. p. 216.
- Ritzler, Remigius; Sefrin, Pirminus (1952). Hierarchia catholica medii et recentis aevi V (1667-1730). Patavii: Messagero di S. Antonio. pp. 237–238.
- Ritzler, Remigius; Sefrin, Pirminus (1958). Hierarchia catholica medii et recentis aevi VI (1730-1799). Patavii: Messagero di S. Antonio. p. 254.
- Sainte-Marthe, Denis de (1716). Gallia Christiana: In Provincias Ecclesiasticas Distributa (in Latin). Vol. Tomus primus. Paris: Typographia Regia. pp. 1285–1306, Instrumenta, pp.198–200.

=== Studies ===
- Combes, P. (abbé) (1885). Les évêques d'Agen: essai historique (in French). Agen.
- Duchesne, Louis (1910). Fastes épiscopaux de l'ancienne Gaule: II. L'Aquitaine et les Lyonnaises. Paris: Fontemoing. p. 100.
- Du Tems, Hugues (1774). Le clergé de France, ou tableau historique et chronologique des archevêques, évêques, abbés, abbesses et chefs des chapitres principaux du royaume, depuis la fondation des églises jusqu'à nos jours, par M. l'abbé Hugues Du Tems (in French). Vol. Tome I. Paris: Brunet. pp. 546–555.
- Labu, Denis (1972). Les évêques et la cathédrale de Lescar (in French). Pau: Éditions Marrimpouey jeune.
