= Guido Pisano =

Guido Pisano (died 1149) was a prelate and diplomat from Pisa. He probably belonged to the family of the counts of Caprona, and was promoted to the College of Cardinals and appointed to the deaconry of Santi Cosma e Damiano by Pope Innocent II on 4 March 1132.

Between 10 and 11 December 1146 he was made Papal chancellor by the Pisan Pope Eugene III. He was widely travelled, intervening in Spain, Portugal, France and Germany, and well-connected, to Wibald, to Anselm of Havelberg and to a succession of popes as well as several emperors and kings.

Guido served as a Papal legate to the Spaniards on three occasions. His first visit probably took place in 1133–34, his second in 1135–37 and his third and final in 1143. During the first he went to León (before August 1134), there to either preside over a synod or attend the royal court, to resolve in favour of Bernardo of Compostela a dispute with his archbishop, Diego Gelmírez, and to confirm the election of Berengar as Bishop of Salamanca, also against Diego's wishes. During the second he presided over a synod in Burgos, which granted an indulgence to the Confraternity of Belchite, and on 26 November 1143 during the third he held a council at Girona, where Count Raymond Berengar IV of Barcelona granted of fifth of the territory he had conquered from the Moors to the Knights Templar. On his way through southern France on his first legation, he resolved in favour of the abbey of Saint-Thibéry a dispute over the church of Bessan with the monastery of La Chaise-Dieu.

Guido had returned to Rome from his first Spanish expedition by December 1134. In 1135 he attended the council of Pisa, and then, with Bernard of Clairvaux and Geoffrey of Chartres, led an embassy to Milan to reconcile the revolting populace, which had declared for the Antipope Anacletus II and deposed Bishop Anselmo della Pusterla, with Innocent II. In June 1139 Guido was again in France as legate, holding a council at Uzès, where he resolved a dispute between the church of Lyons and the abbey of Cluny about which know nothing, and also revised his decision on the matter Bessan, forcing Saint-Thibéry to make an annual payment to La Chaise-Dieu as compensation.

Guido returned to Rome by mid-November 1139, and he was still there in 1141, when the Papal curia deposed in absentia Abbot Ariulf of Saint-Riquier from the monastery of Oudenburg. He joined the curia in June 1145, before he was made chancellor. In April 1146 he left the curia to help prepare the regency of Germany during the absence of Conrad III, who was about to leave on the Second Crusade.

Either on 20 April (Easter), at Bamberg, or else on 23 April, at an imperial diet held in Nuremberg, he had a personal audience with Conrad. At the end of the month he met Wibald, a friend with whom he had corresponded by letters for over twenty years, in Würzburg. Guido joined Pope Eugene when the latter took ship from Pisa to France in 1147, there to hold several reforming councils and encourage the Second Crusade. Guido was with the Papal entourage when it entered Trier on 30 November. They returned to Rome in April 1148.

Guido last subscribes to a document dated 16 May 1149, and his successor, Boso, was cardinal-deacon in November. The Gesta Adalberonis records that he was "a very wise man and notably eloquent" (virum prudentissimum et breviloquio notabilem) and Otto of Freising singles him out: "many great and learned men [come] out of the Roman part of the Church, one of whom was Guido the Pisan, who was a cardinal and chancellor of [the Roman] court" (ex parte Romanae ecclesiae viros magnos et claros, quorum unus Guido Pisanus, eiusdem curiae cardinalis et cancellarius erat).
