= Ancient Diocese of Couserans =

Roman Catholic diocese in France (4th c. – 1801)

Coordinates: 43.00°N 1.14°E

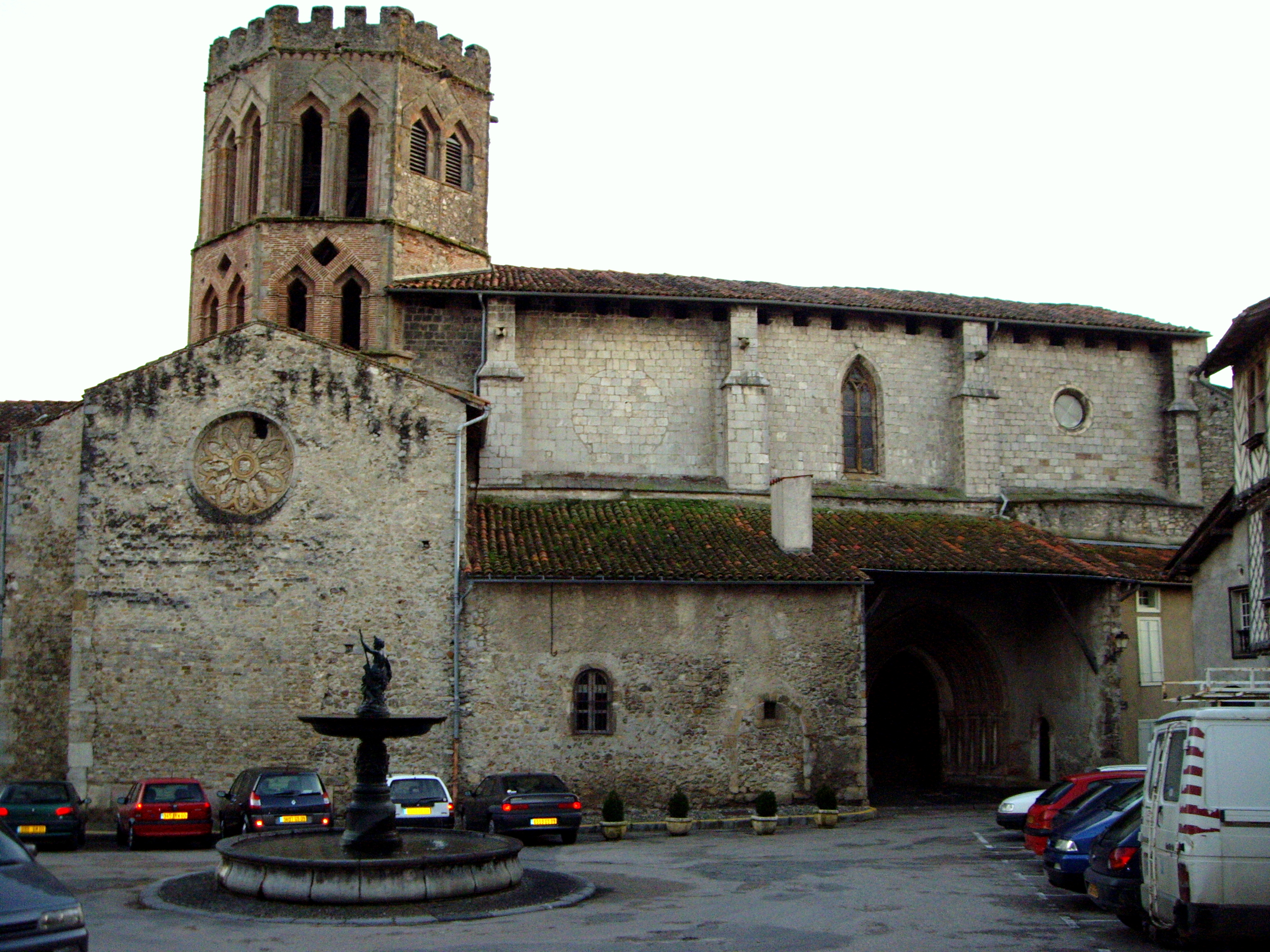
Saint-Lizier Cathedral

The former French Catholic diocese of Couserans existed perhaps from the fifth century to the French Revolution in the late eighteenth century. It covered the former province of Couserans, in south-west France. Its episcopal seat was in Saint-Lizier, a small town to the west of Foix. It was a suffragan of the archdiocese of Auch.

== History ==
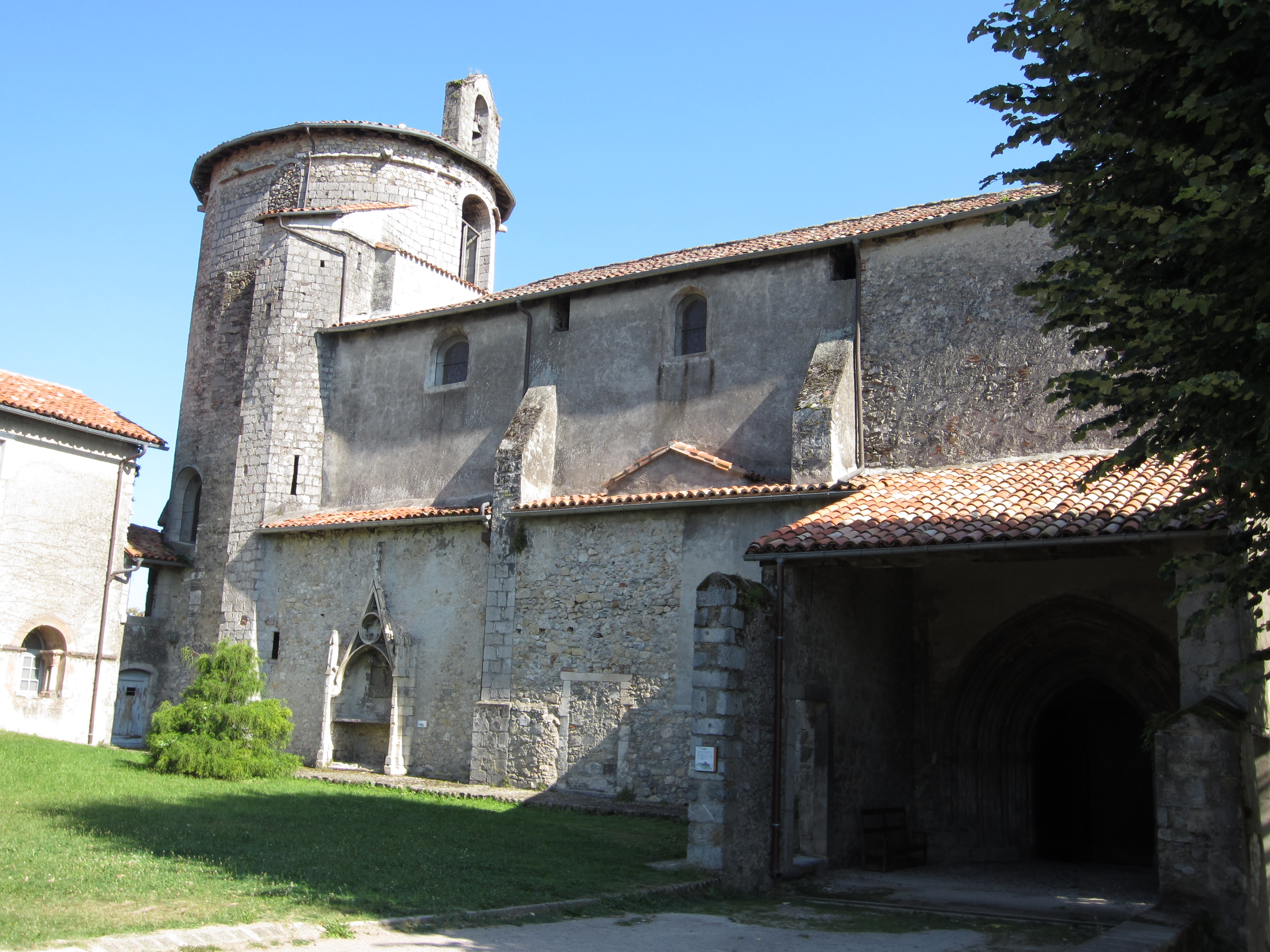
Cathedral of Notre-Dame-de-la-Sède

Couserans was the fifth of the Novempopulaniae civitates. In the 580's peace and a division of territories was arranged between the Merovingian kings Guntram (561–592) and Childebert II (575–595), in which the territory of Couserans was assigned to Childebert. According to Gregory of Tours, the first bishop was Valerius, before the sixth century. Bishop Glycerius was present at the Council of Agde in 506. According to Louis Duchesne, he should be identified with Lycerius whom the Gallia Christiana places later in the list of bishops. Lycerius was patron saint of St-Lizier, the town in which the bishops of Couserans had their official residence.

The historian Pierre de Marca (1643–52), a native of Béarn and President of the Parliament of Navarre, was subsequently Bishop of Toulouse and Archbishop of Paris.

Up until the administration of Bishop Bernard de Marmiesse (1654–1680), the town of Saint-Lezier had two co-cathedrals, the Cathedral of Notre-Dame-de-la-Sède in the upper town next to the Episcopal Palace, and the Cathedral of St.-Lizier farther down to the south. Each co-cathedral was served by its own Chapter, each Chapter having a Precentor, a Sacristan, an Operarius, six Canons, ten Prebendarii and a priest called the Vicar Perpetuus. Over both Chapters stood the Archdeacon and the Aumonier. Bishop de Marmiesse united the two chapters and based them in the Cathedral of Notre-Dame-de-la-Sède; it was composed of the Archdeacon, two Precentors, two Sacristans, two Operarii, the Aumonier, twelve Canons, and two Vicarii perpetui; there were twenty-four prebends. In 1752 there was one dignity and twelve Canons.

The diocese of Couserans was abolished in 1801. In 1822, its territory became part of the restored Diocese of Pamiers, which was renamed "Diocese of Pamiers, Couserans, and Mirepoix" in 1910.

== Bishops ==
=== to 1200 ===
- c. 451: Valerius
- 506-c. 548: Glycerius
- 549–551: Theodorus
- c. 614: Johannes I
- Saint Quintianus
- † ca. 663: Saint Licerius
- c. 663 or 664: Sesemundus
- Maurolenus
- c. 788-c. 791: Francolinus
- c. 879: Wainardus
- c. 887: Rogerius or Roger I.
- 973–978: Bernardus or Bernard I.
- c. 1019: Atto
- c. 1025: Berengarius or Béranger I.
- c. 1035: Bernard II. Raymond
- 1068–1078: Pelet
- 1078–1085: Vacant
- 1085–1095: William I. or Guilielmus
- 1117–1120: Jordanes I.
- 1120–1155: Petrus or Pierre I.
- 1165–1177: Rogerius or Roger II.
- c. 1177: Augustinus
- Stephanus (?)
- c. 1180: Auger I. (or Augerius I.)
- 1190–1191: Arnoldus or Arnaldus I.
- 1195–1198: Laurentius

=== 1200 to 1400 ===
- 1208–1211: Navarrus d'Acqs
- 1213: Sance or Sanchius
- c. 1226: Raymond I. (or Raymundus I.)
- c. 1229: Cerebrun
- 1246–4 October 1270: Nikolaus
- c. 1273: Petrus or Pierre II.
- ?-16. October 1275: Raymond II. de Sobole or de Saboulies
- 1277-c. 1279: Raymond III. de Rostoil
- 1279–1 June 1303: Auger II. (or Augustin) de Montfaucon
- 1303 – 31 May 1309: Bernard III. de Montaigu
- 4 July 1309 – 31 May 1329: Arnaldus II. Fredeti
- 27 June 1329 – 17 July 1336: Raymond IV. de Montaigu
- 17 July 1336 – c. 1337: Antonius d'Aspel
- c. 1337–1342: Pierre III. de Palude
- Durandus
- 1354–1 December 1358: Canardus
- c. 1358–1360 or 1361: Jean II. de Rochechouart
- c. 1361–17 October 1362: Béranger II.
- 10 December 1362 – 1368: Ponce de Villemur
- 19 August 1371 – 18 May 1384: Amelius de Lautrec
- [1381–1384: Arnaldus III.]
- 18 May 1384 – 1389: Pierre IV Aymery (Avignon Obedience)
- 27 May 1390 – 17 October 1390: Robert du Bosc
- 17 October 1390 – 18 September 1405: Gérald or Gérard I de Brolio (de Breuil)

=== 1400 to 1800 ===
- 1405 – 19 Juli 1412: Sicard (or Aicard) de Burguiroles
- 23 September 1412 – (17. January): Guillaume III. Beau-Maître
- 1417–1423?: Guillaume IV. de Nalajo
- 22 December 1423 – 18 May 1425: Arnaldus
- 1425–1428: Jean III
- 1428–1432: Gérard II. Faidit
- before 23 March 1439 – 1440: André
- 18 April 1440 – 1443: Jordanes II. d'Aure
- 1443-c. 1444: Raymond VI. de Tullio
- 1444–1460: Tristan
- 5 November 1460 – 10 March 1475: Guiscard d'Aubusson
- 1480–1515: Jean IV. d'Aule
- 25 June 1515 – 24 April 1523: Charles de Grammont
- 28 April 1523 – 19 September 1524: Gabriel I. de Grammont
- 1524–1548: Ménald de Martory
- 1548–1574: Hector d'Ossun
- 1581–1584: François Bonard
- 1593–1612: Jérôme de Langue (de Lingua)
- 1614–14. November 1621: Octave de Bellegarde
- 7 June 1623 – October 1642: Bruno Ruade, O.Cart.
- 1642-1654: Pierre de Marca
- 28 May 1654 – 22 January 1680: Bernard IV. de Marmiesse
- 1680 – 24 December 1707: Gabriel II. de Saint-Estève
- 24 June 1708 – October 1725: Isaac-Jacob de Verthamont
- 12 January 1727 – 1752: Jean-François de Machéco de Prémeaux
- 22 October 1752 – 28 September 1779: Joseph de Saint-André-Marnays de Vercel
- 1780 – 1795: Dominique de Lastic

== See also ==
- Catholic Church in France
- List of Catholic dioceses in France

== Bibliography ==
=== Reference works ===
- Gams, Pius Bonifatius (1873). Series episcoporum Ecclesiae catholicae: quotquot innotuerunt a beato Petro apostolo. Ratisbon: Typis et Sumptibus Georgii Josephi Manz. pp. 540–541. (Use with caution; obsolete)
- Eubel, Conradus, ed. (1913). Hierarchia catholica, Tomus 1 (second ed.). Münster: Libreria Regensbergiana. (in Latin) pp. 103–104.
- Eubel, Conradus, ed. (1914). Hierarchia catholica, Tomus 2 (second ed.). Münster: Libreria Regensbergiana. (in Latin) p. 134.
- Gulik, Guilelmus (1923). Eubel, Conradus (ed.). Hierarchia catholica, Tomus 3 (second ed.). Münster: Libreria Regensbergiana. p. 176.
- Gauchat, Patritius (Patrice) (1935). Hierarchia catholica IV (1592–1667). Münster: Libraria Regensbergiana. p. 160.
- Ritzler, Remigius; Sefrin, Pirminus (1952). Hierarchia catholica medii et recentis aevi V (1667–1730). Patavii: Messagero di S. Antonio. p. 169.
- Ritzler, Remigius; Sefrin, Pirminus (1958). Hierarchia catholica medii et recentis aevi VI (1730–1799). Patavii: Messagero di S. Antonio. p. 179.
- Sainte-Marthe, Denis de (1715). Gallia Christiana, In Provincias Ecclesiasticas Distributa; Qua Series Et Historia Archiepiscoporum, Episcoporum, Et Abbatum Franciae Vicinarumque Ditionum ab origine Ecclesiarum ad nostra tempora deducitur, & probatur ex authenticis Instrumentis ad calcem appositis: Tomus Primus (in Latin). Vol. Tomus primus. Paris: Johannes-Baptista Coignard. pp. 1123–1187, Instrumenta, 185–190.

=== Studies ===
- Devic, Claude; Vaissete, J. (1872). Histoire générale de Languedoc: avec des notes et les pièces justificatives (in French). Vol. Tome IV. Toulouse: Privat. pp. 378–383.
- Duchesne, Louis (1910). Fastes épiscopaux de l'ancienne Gaule: II. L'Aquitaine et les Lyonnaises. Paris: Fontemoing. pp. 99–100.
- Du Tems, Hugues (1774). Le clergé de France, ou tableau historique et chronologique des archevêques, évêques, abbés, abbesses et chefs des chapitres principaux du royaume, depuis la fondation des églises jusqu'à nos jours (in French). Vol. Tome premier. Paris: Delalain. pp. 482–492.
- Jean, Armand (1891). Les évêques et les archevêques de France depuis 1682 jusqu'à 1801 (in French). Paris: A. Picard. pp. 78–79.
