= Glycerius of Antioch =

Christian saint, martyr and a deacon

Saint Glycerius of Antioch

Martyr
- Died: c.300 AD; Antioch
- Venerated in: Roman Catholic Church
- Canonized: Pre-congregation
- Feast: 14 January

Glycerius (Italian: Glicerio) was a deacon who was martyred in Antioch. He is honoured as a Saint in the Catholic Church. Previously, he was listed as 'Clerus' on 7 January in the Old Roman Martyrology.

== Life ==
Almost nothing is known about the life and martyrdom of Glycerius. He was a deacon and martyr of Antioch. He was tortured seven times, imprisoned, and finally martyred by beheading in Antioch, Syria.
