= Arnaud-Raymond II. de Béon =

Raymond-Arnaud de Beon also known as Arnaud-Raymond II, was a sixteenth century Catholic prelate and Bishop of Oloron in France.

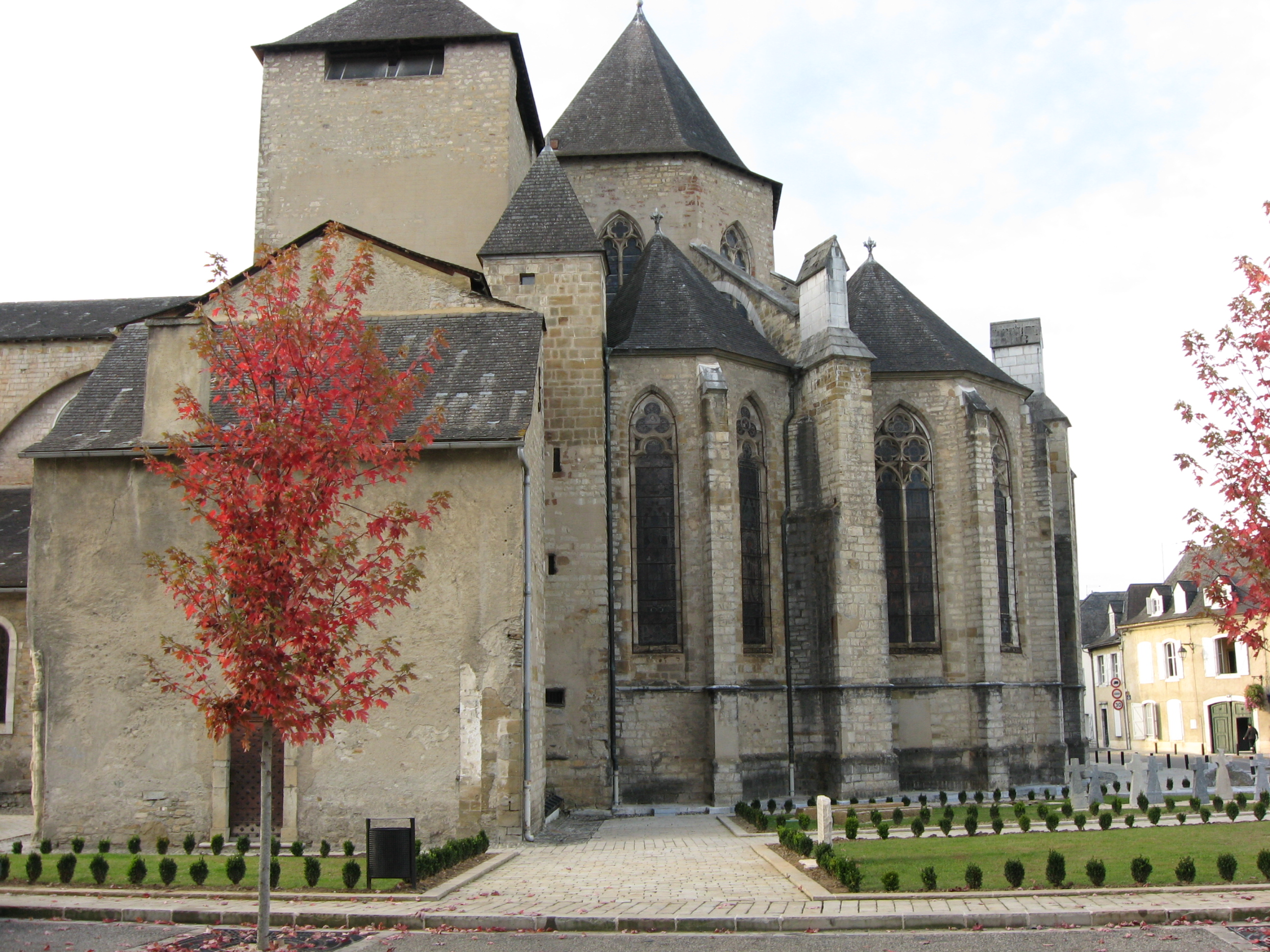
The former Oloron Cathedral, now St Mary's Church.

He assumed the bishopric from Cardinal Amanieu d'Albret who was acting as Administrator and he was Bishop of Oloron from 1507 until 1519 when he was replaced by Cardinal Jean Salviati who acted as Administrator.

He was the executor for his cousin Catherine de Foix, Queen of Navarre, great-grandmother 'of Henry IV of France. He was therefore a relative of Gaston IV, Count of Foix and Eleanor of Navarre (monarch of the Kingdom of Navarre), John II of Aragón and Blanche I of Navarre and of the succeeding bishop, Jacques de Foix.

Religious titles
Preceded by Cardinal Juan López (Administrator)	Bishop of Oloron; 1507–1519	Succeeded by Giovanni Salviati (Administrator)
