= Roger I. de Sentes =

Roger I. de Sentes also known as Rogerius was a twelfth century French Catholic Bishop.

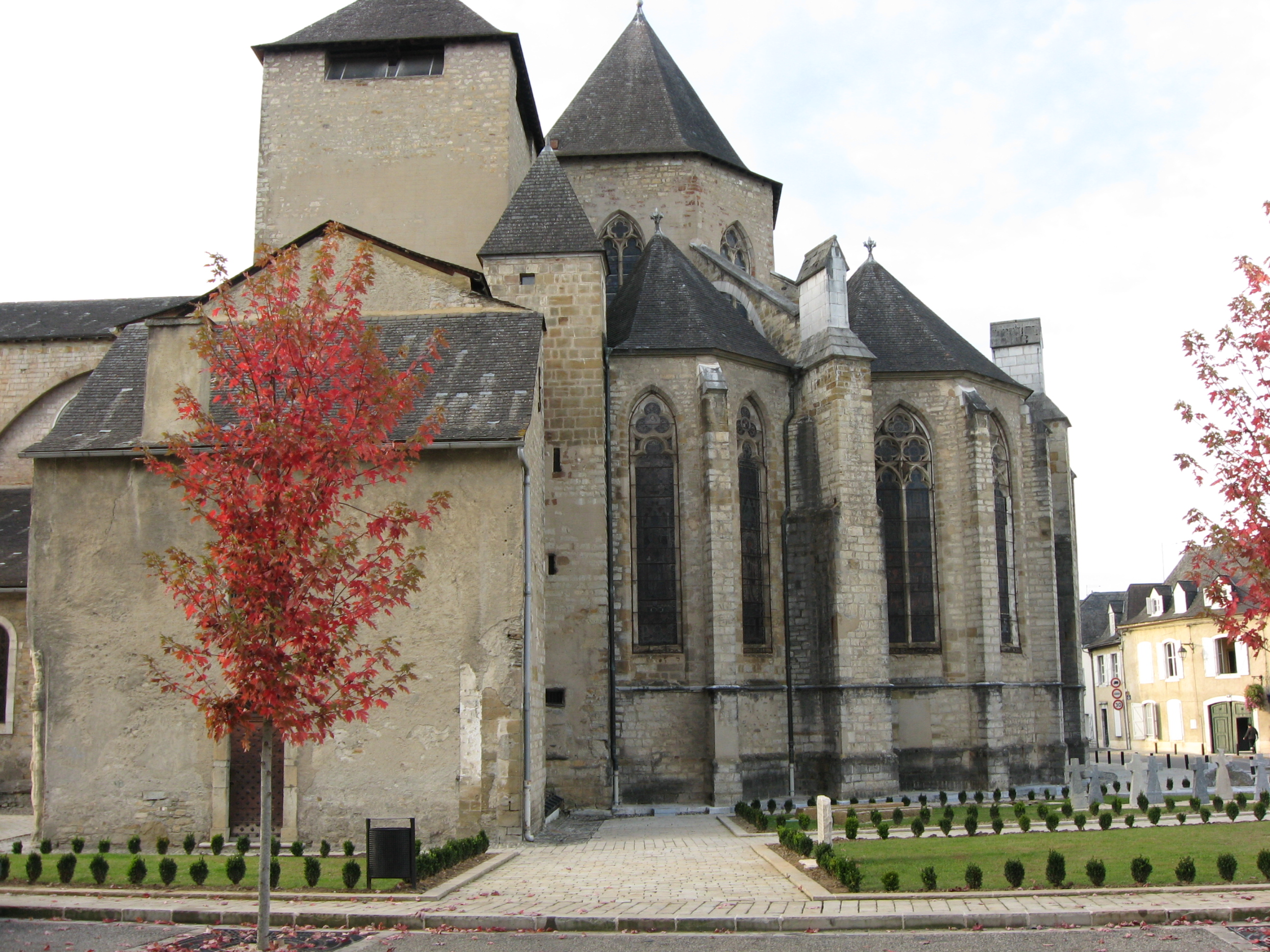
The former Oloron Cathedral, now St Mary's Church, Oloron (built by Roger I.)

Not much is known of his career or episciple work but he was Bishop of Oloron from 1102 until 1114 A.D. His most notable achievement is the construction of Oloron Cathedral.

Religious titles
Preceded by Odon de Bénac	Bishop of Oloron; 1102–1114	Succeeded by Arnaud I. d'Araux
