= Jean I. de Pardailhan =

French Catholic bishop

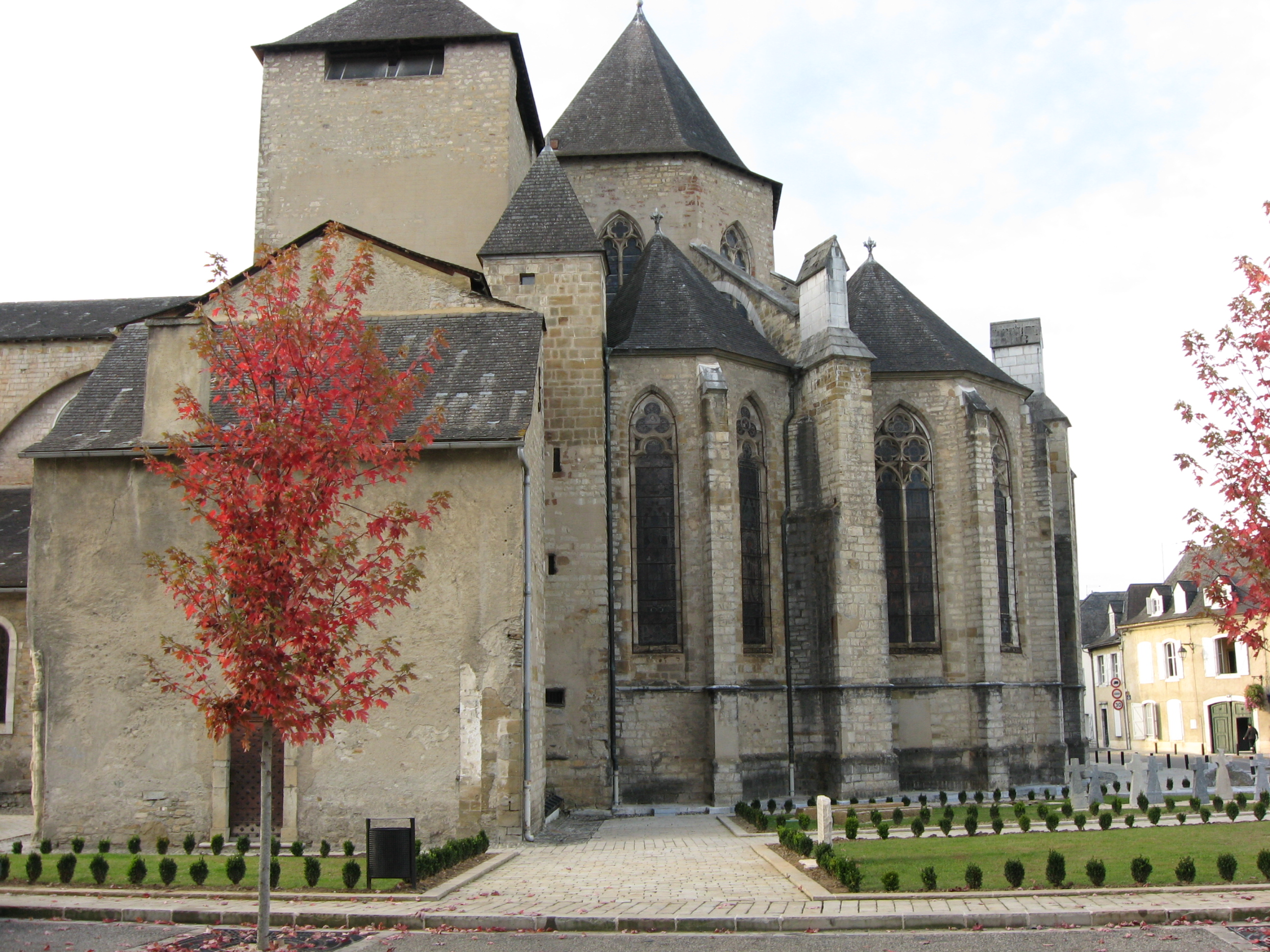
The former Oloron Cathedral, now St Mary's Church.

Jean de Pardaillan was a fourteenth century Catholic Bishop of Oloron in France.

He was Bishop of Oloron from 1 May 1491 until his resignation in 1500. After his resignation the diocese was Administered for 25 years by Cardinals Juan López, Amanieu d'Albret and Giovanni Salviati.

Religious titles
Preceded by Sance II. de Casenave	Bishop of Oloron; 1491–1500	Succeeded by Jacques de Foix
