= Jean-Baptiste-Auguste de Villoutreix =

French prelate of the Catholic Church (1739–1792)

His Excellency, The Most Reverend Jean-Baptiste-Auguste de Villoutreix
- Bishop of Oloron
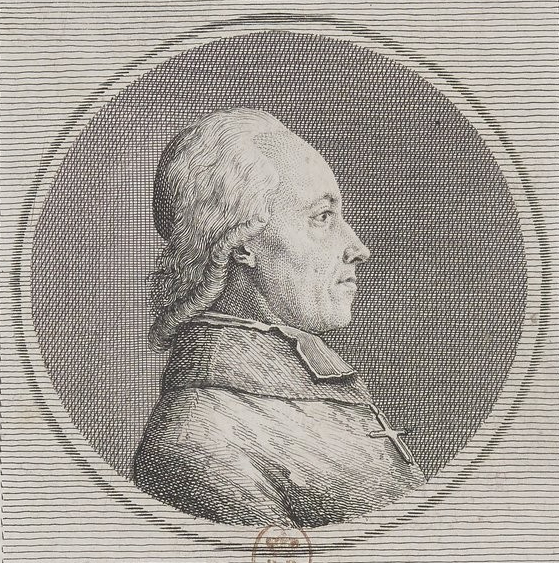
- Church: Catholic
- Diocese: Oloron
- Appointed: 18 July 1783
- Term ended: 12 Mar 1792
- Predecessor: François de Revol

Personal details
- Born: 3 November 1739 Flavignac, France
- Died: 12 March 1792 (aged 52) Paris, France

Ordination history
History
Episcopal consecration
- Principal consecrator: Étienne Charles de Loménie de Brienne
- Co-consecrators: Louis-Apolinaire de La Tour du Pin-Montauban, Seignelay Colbert of Castlehill

Jean-Baptiste-Auguste de Villoutreix de Faye (3 November 1739 – 12 March 1792) was a French prelate of the Catholic Church. He served as the last Bishop of the Diocese of Oloron in France.

He was born in Flavignac in the Limousin region of France, a member of the Villoutreix de Faye family who derived their name from the Castle "Faye" in the parish of Flavignac (Haute-Vienne).

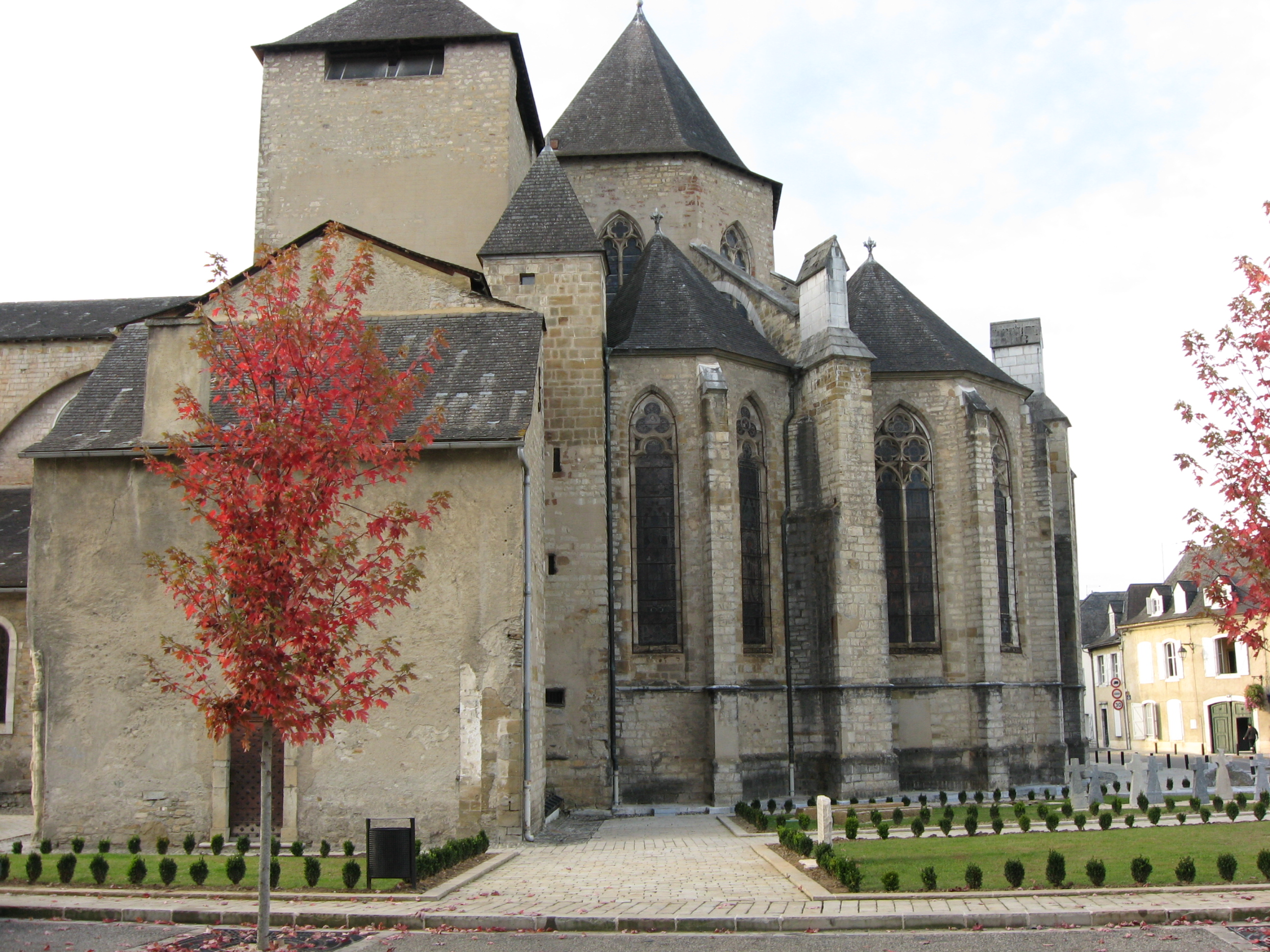
The former Oloron Cathedral, now St Mary's Church

He was appointed Bishop of Oloron on 18 July 1783, and was consecrated as a bishop on 17 August 1783 by the Archbishop of Toulouse, Étienne Charles de Loménie de Brienne.

He wrote in Occitan, French and Basque, and his written works include:

- Villoutreix de Faye, Jean-Baptiste-Auguste de (1817). "Imprimatur". Catechisma oloroeco diocesaren cerbutchuco [Catechism of the Diocese of Oloron]. By Révol, François de. Maytie, Jacques de (ed.). (in French and Basque). Toulouse: Augustin Henault. OCLC 460469674 – via Bibliothèque nationale de France.

He died in Paris.

Religious titles
Preceded by François de Revol	Bishop of Oloron; 1783–1792	Succeeded by See abolished
