= Agustius (bishop) =

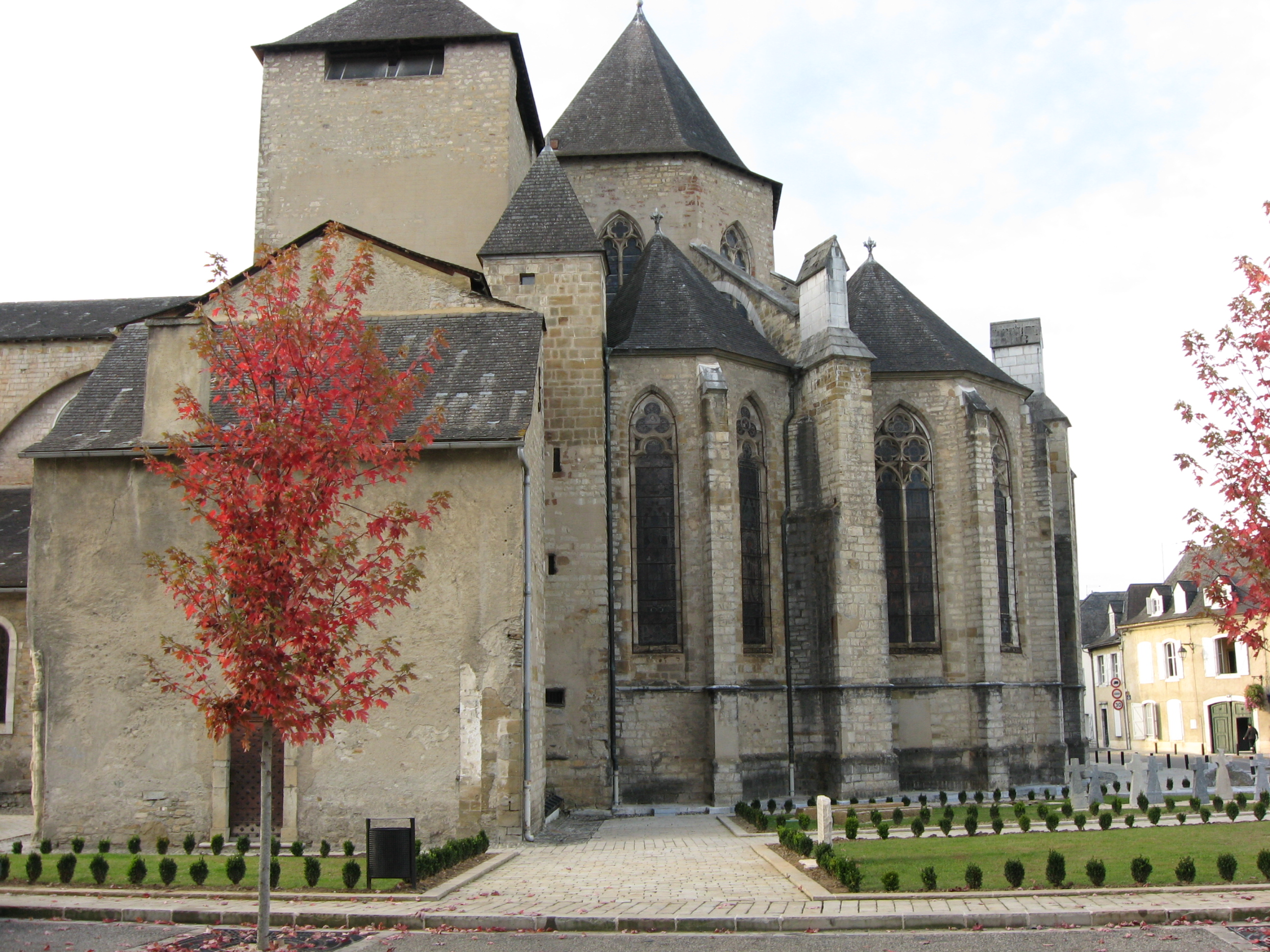
The former Oloron Cathedral, now St Mary's Church, Oloron

Agustius also known as Eusepius, was a sixth-century Catholic Bishop of Oloron in France.

Although the sixth century was a formative time for the French state, the historical records of the time are sparse and little is known about his origins, career or his episcopal work. However, according to the La Grande Encyclopédie, he held the see between 551 and 573 AD. He assumed the see following Gratus of Oloron at a time when the Catholic Church in Southern France was facing significant persecution from the Visigoth kings.

== See also ==
- Oloron-Sainte-Marie
- Ancient Diocese of Oloron

Catholic Church titles
Preceded by Gratus	Bishop of Oloron; 551–573	Succeeded by Lexer
