= Barthélémy-Jean-Baptiste Sanadon =

Bartholomew John the Baptist Sanadon, better known by the name of Jean-Baptiste Sanadon was a constitutional Catholic Bishop and a member of the revolutionary Convention.

== Early life ==
He was born in February 1729 in Evreux (Eure) and died on 9 February 1796 in Sainte-Marie, Pyrénées-Atlantiques). Sanadon entered the Benedictine order and he was principal of the college of Pau, having been a professor of history and literature. In 1785, Sanadon published an essay on the nobility of the Basques, which he extracted from manuscripts of papers knight Jean Philippe de Bela.

== Revolutionary Work ==
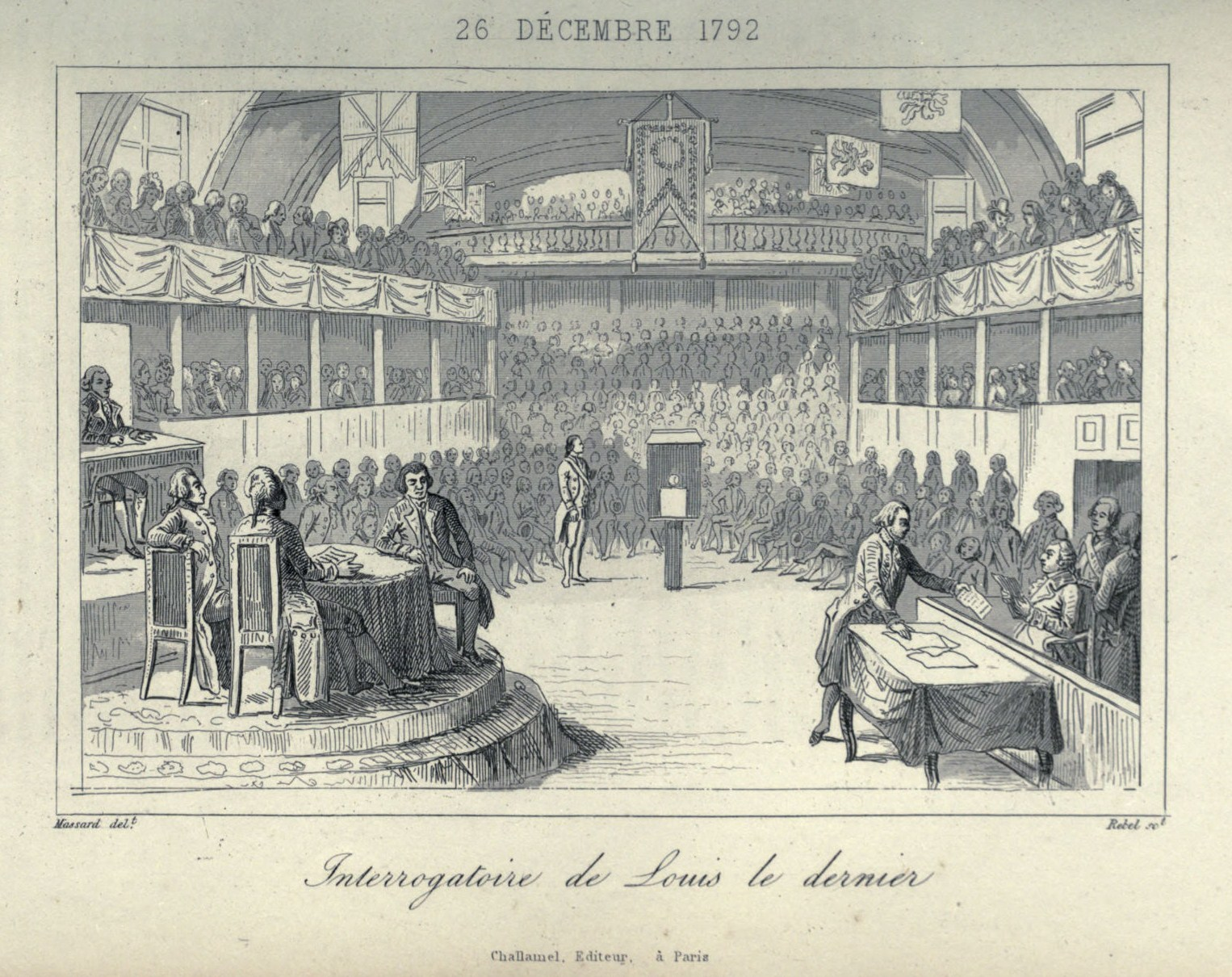
Louis being cross-examined by the Convention.

He was attracted to the ideas of the Revolution and he took the citizenship oath and was elected constitutional bishop of the Lower Pyrenees on 2 March 1790. He moved to Bayonne and took possession of his diocese, on 21 June 1790, despite the protests of former bishops of Lescar, Oloron and Bayonne against the "intrusion" by the new regime.

On 4 September 1792, the electorate in ‘‘Basses-Pyrénées’’ chose him to sit in the National Convention (the first of 6). where he sat with the moderate section. He was also in the so called ‘‘third roll call in the trial of Louis XVI’’ where he said "I vote for life imprisonment for war and peace, deportation."

He resigned on 13 August 1793 and he returned to Bayonne, where he was detained for several months in the Citadel of the Holy Spirit in 1793 and released in 1794, then went to Spain. He was the last Bishop of Oloron.

Religious titles
Preceded by Jean-Baptiste-Auguste de Villoutreix	Bishop of Oloron; 1791 to 1793	Succeeded by see abolished
