= Guillaume III d'Assat (bishop of Oloron) =

Guillaume III. d'Assat also known as ou Guilielmus was a fourteenth century Catholic Bishop of Oloron in France.

== Biography ==
According to the La Grande Encyclopédie he was Bishop of Oloron from 3 June 1371 until his resignation in 1394, although the dates given in the le Trésor de Chronologie are slightly different. There is some hint that he was pressured to resign. After his resignation rival claimants contested to be bishop, as part of the Avignon Papacy controversy. Armand-Guilhem de Bury was the Avignon nomination, while Ogier Vilesongnes was Rome's nomination.

== See also ==
Religious titles
Preceded by Pierre II. d'Estiron	Bishop of Oloron; 1371 – 1395	Succeeded by Armand-Guilhem de Bury
