= Étienne de Mauléon =

French Catholic bishop

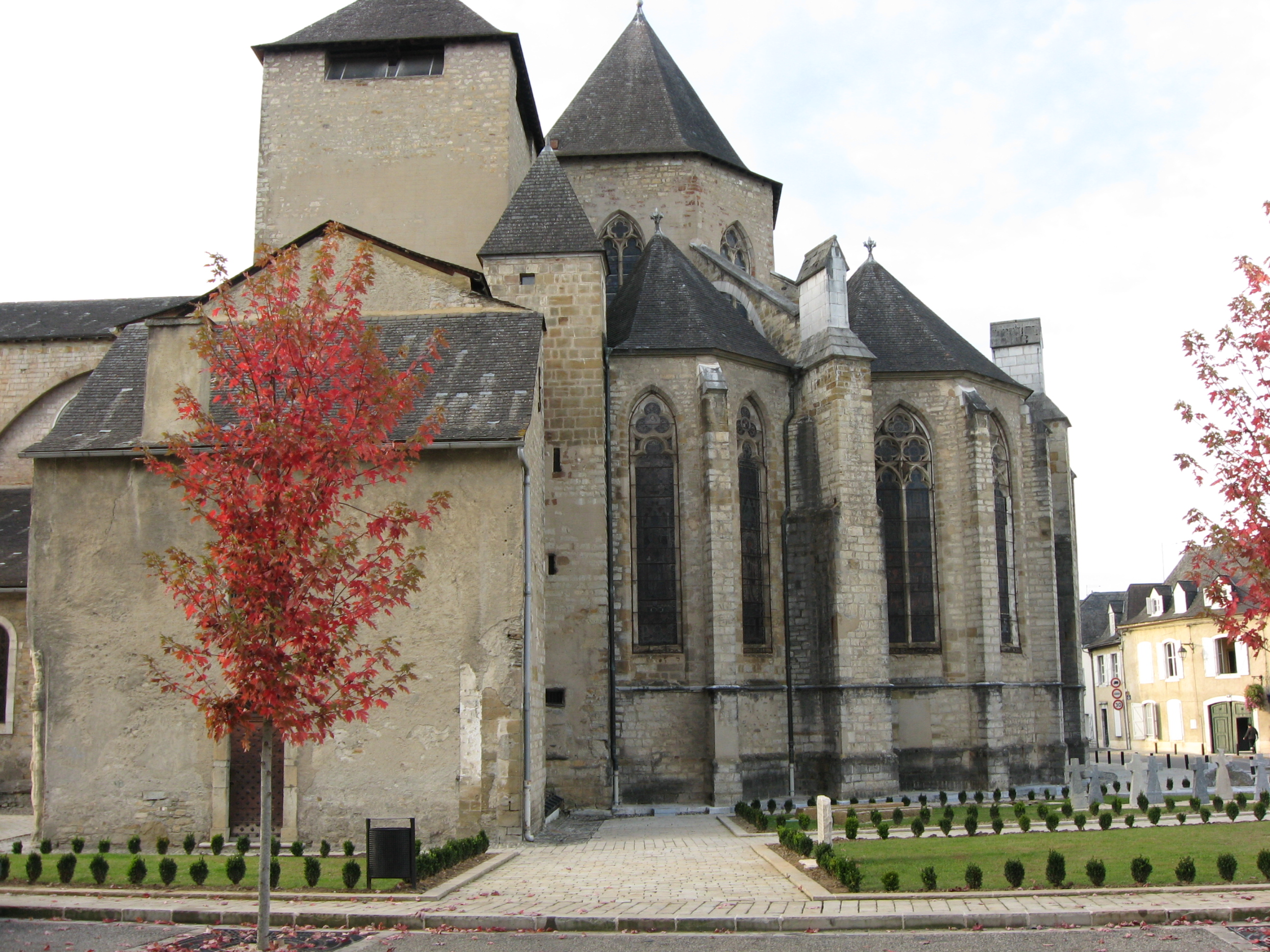
The former Oloron Cathedral, now St Mary's Church, Oloron

Etienne de Mauléon also known as Stephanus, was an eleventh-century French Catholic Bishop of Oloron. Not much is known of his career or episcopal work but he was Bishop from 1060 A.D. until 1078 when he was succeeded by the reformer Amat d'Oloron.

Religious titles
Preceded by Raymond I. le Vieux	Bishop of Oloron; 1060–1078	Succeeded by Amat d'Oloron
