= Château de Maÿtie =

Coordinates: 43.2253°N 0.8858°W

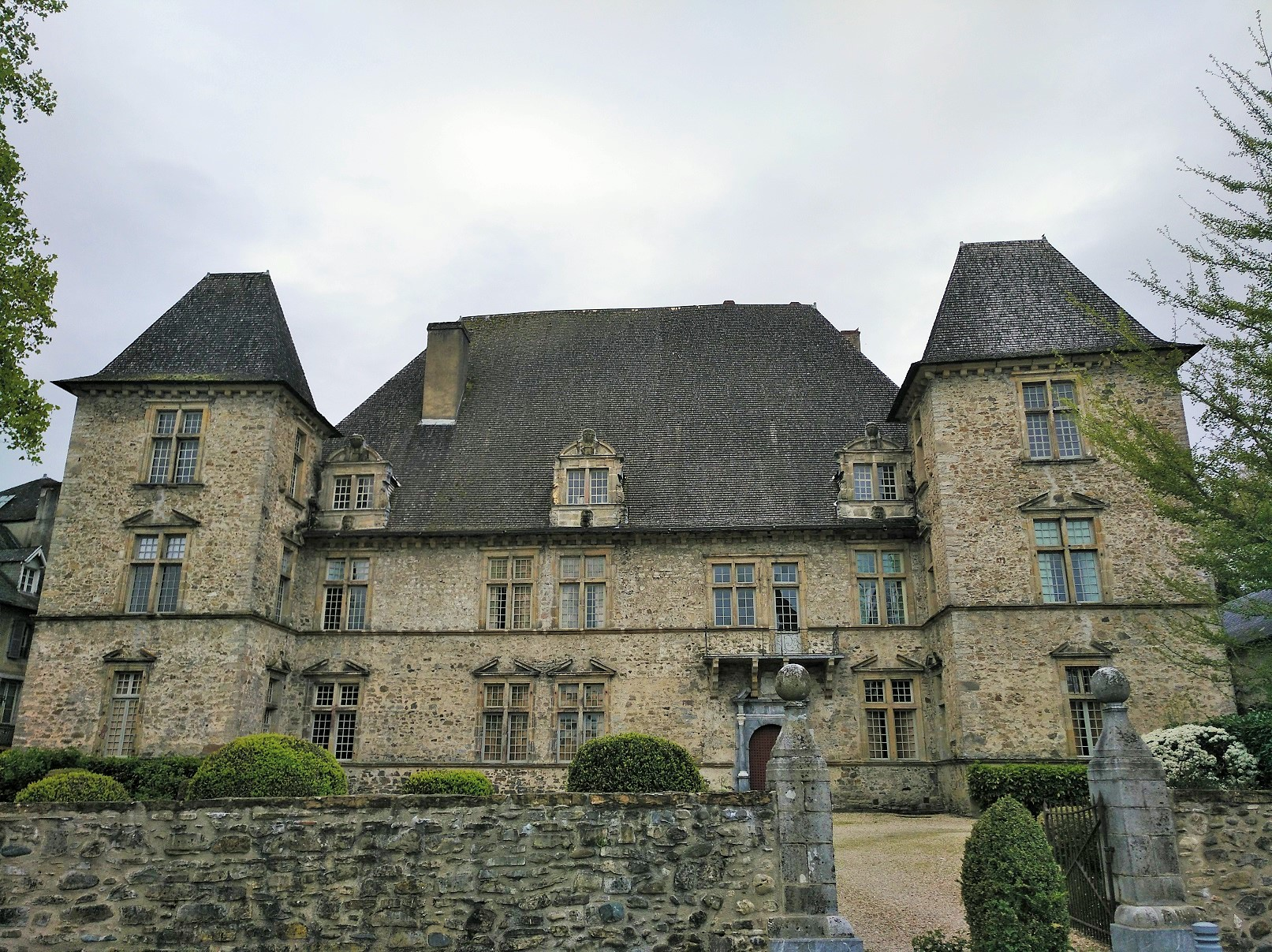
Château de Maÿtie in 2019

Château de Maÿtie, also known as Château d'Andurain, is a castle located at 1 rue du Jeu-de-Paume, Mauléon-Licharre, in the Pyrénées-Atlantiques department, Aquitaine region, southwestern France. Of French Renaissance architecture style, it was built in the late 16th-century and has been classified as a monument historique since 1925.

== Architecture ==
Location of Château de Maÿtie in Aquitaine

The castle has a rectangular shape, flanked at each corner with a square tower. The Renaissance-style architecture encompasses a particularly elegant façade : mullioned windows and pediments, line-alleviating arches, mascarons and a carved balcony. The façade serves as a counterpoint to the imposing, three-story high roof with chestnut shingles.

The interior is characterized by a staircase of graceful openwork arches, serving all floors. The large salon on the ground floor and the bishop's room on the first floor include carved Baroque fireplaces, embedded with a medallion bearing the arms and likeness of Bishop Arnaud de Maytie.

== History ==
The castle was originally built by Arnaud de Maytie who was the Catholic Bishop of Oloron between 1599 and 1623.

In 1661, a revolt under the priest Matalas led to the destruction of one of the four towers of the castle, which has never been rebuilt. The castle has remained in the Azémar Fabrègues family since its construction. The castle is open to visitors during the months of July through September.
