= Garsias de La Mothe =

15th-century French Catholic bishop

Most Reverend Garsias de La Mothe
- Bishop of Oloron
- Church: Catholic Church
- Diocese: Diocese of Oloron
- In office: 1465–1473
- Predecessor: Guillaume de Fondera
- Successor: Sanche de Casanova

Orders
- Consecration: 18 August 1465 by Guillaume d'Estouteville

Personal details
- Died: 1473 Oloron, France

Garsias de La Mothe or Garsias II. de La Mothe (died 1473) was a Roman Catholic prelate who served as Bishop of Oloron (1465–1473).

== Biography ==
On 24 July 1465, Garsias de La Mothe was appointed during the papacy of Pope Paul II as Bishop of Oloron. On 18 August 1465, he was consecrated bishop by Guillaume d'Estouteville, Cardinal-Bishop of Ostia e Velletri, with Philippe de Lévis, Archbishop of Arles, and Michael Anglicus, Bishop of Carpentras, serving as co-consecrators. He served as Bishop of Oloron until his death in 1473.

Catholic Church titles
| Preceded by Guillaume de Fondera | Bishop of Oloron; 1465–1473 | Succeeded by Sanche de Casanova |
