= Antonius Rufus =

Antonius Rufus was the name of a number of men of ancient Rome:

- Antonius Rufus (grammarian), Latin grammarian
- Aulus Antonius Rufus, served as suffect consul of the Roman senate with Marcus Pompeius Silvanus Staberius Flavinus in the year 45.
- Gaius Antonius Rufus, procurator Augusti (that is, chief financial officer of a Roman province) for the province of Pannonia around the 3rd century. There was an inscription to him in a temple dedicated to the Mithraic mysteries in the legionary base of Poetovio (modern Ptuj).
- Antonius Rufus, a Jewish freedman (or libertinus) of the gens Antonia from Apollonopolis Magna (modern Edfu) who lived in the Jewish quarter of that city in the 1st century, and is mentioned on several ostraka as the father of two sons, Nikon and Theodotos.
- Marcus Antonius Rufus, a prominent Roman of the time of Hadrian (that is, early 2nd century), who appears to have lived in Dioskourias, based on inscriptions we have of him there.
- Antonius Rufus Vacariensis, Latin name of Antoine Roussel (that is, Antoine Roussel from La Vacquerie), brother of French cleric Gérard Roussel (or Gerardus Rufus Vacariensis). He lived in the 16th century, and worked as a corrector for printer Henri Estienne, and as a writer contributed work to collections edited by the theologian Josse van Clichtove.
