= Gérard Roussel =

French cleric

Gérard Roussel (1500–1550) was a French cleric and a member (with his former teacher Jacques Lefèvre d'Étaples) of the Circle of Meaux around Guillaume Briçonnet, bishop of Meaux. This group was characterized by evangelical sensibilities, but remained Catholic, at a time when religious identities were unclear and a matter of dispute, due to the very recent Protestant Reformation.

Roussel, along with his teacher and friend Jacques Lefèvre d'Étaples, was described by the historian Thierry Wanegffelen as being "between two pulpits", that of Rome and that of Geneva where Jean Calvin would settle permanently in 1541, and, more generally, between Catholicism and Protestantism.

The Circle of Meaux was broken up in 1525. Roussel, like most of its members and unlike Guillaume Farel, stayed within the Catholic Church. He then became the personal preacher of Marguerite of Navarre, queen consort of Navarre; under her patronage, he became bishop of the diocese of Oloron, within the kingdom of Navarre, in 1536. Jean Calvin addressed on this occasion a letter to Roussel, mostly condemnatory, in which he said :

You [Roussel], who were once blaming the excesses of the Roman clergy, now accept a dignity that forces you to recognize the Mass, although you see it as idolatry, and to pronounce excommunications, although you recognize their injustice.

— Calvin, "To a former friend now a bishop", Quoted in Schmidt, C., Gérard Roussel: prédicateur de la reine Marguerite de Navarre, Strasbourg, Genève, 1845."

Calling to mind the "former piety" of Roussel, "which I [Calvin] formerly admired, and which was for me an example of extreme worth", he called Roussel

To the trumpet, you who are to be on watch, to your arms, priest ! What are you waiting for [...] ? Is it time to sleep ? You have so many people's deaths to account for in front of the Lord !

— Calvin, "To a former friend now a bishop", Quoted in Schmidt, C., Gérard Roussel: prédicateur de la reine Marguerite de Navarre, Strasbourg, Genève, 1845."

Calvin ended his letter with a condemnation of Roussel's new position :

Then, as long as through theft and plunder you shall suck the poor's blood [...] to use and abuse it for superfluous excesses; as long as you shall profane the duty of a priest to hideously and mischievously destroy the flock; as long as you shall be among those that Christ calls thieves, robbers and murderers of his church [...] I shall never hold you to be neither a Christian nor a good man.

— Calvin, "To a former friend now a bishop", Quoted in Schmidt, C., Gérard Roussel: prédicateur de la reine Marguerite de Navarre, Strasbourg, Genève, 1845."

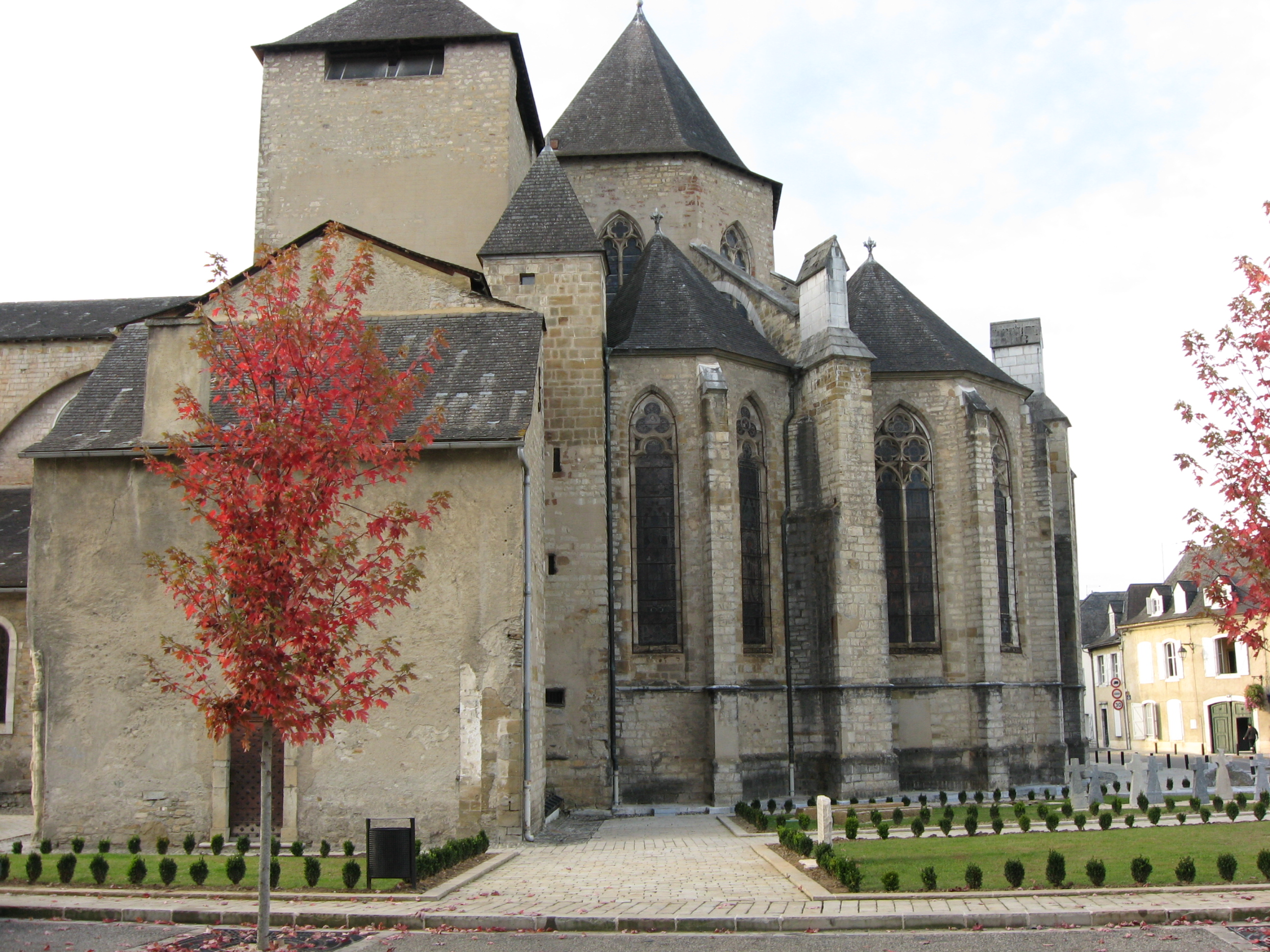
The former Oloron Cathedral, now St Mary's Church.

Gérard Roussel did not cease to be bishop of Oloron; however, he served as advisor to Marguerite of Navarre and then to her husband, king Henry II of Navarre. On his advice, measures quite similar to some aspects of the Protestant Reformation were introduced, such as preaching in vernacular rather than Latin, but without formally breaking away from Catholicism.

In much the same spirit, and to establish a reference for the priests of the kingdom of Navarre, he wrote the Familiar Exposition of the Creed, of the Law and of the Sunday Prayer (Familière exposition du symbole, de la loi et de l'oraison dominicale) in which he explained these fundamental texts in a light that could be seen as Protestant, especially close to the idea of justification by faith; it should however be noted that this trend of interpretation existed within Christianity before the Protestant Reformation, and was still held by some Catholic bishops and theologians. However, such a stance was by now suspect at best, and in 1550 the Sorbonne, at that time Paris' university of theology and a major orthodoxy watchdog in the kingdom of France, condemned Roussel's work as "pernicious for Christiendom [...] reeking of heresy and in part obviously heretic".

Thus, condemned by representatives of both the catholic orthodoxy and the calvinist orthodoxy, Roussel indeed illustrated these men "between Rome and Geneva" studied by Thierry Wanegffelen. He died in the same year 1550.

He had a brother, Antoine Roussel.

Religious titles
Preceded by Cardinal Juan López (Administrator)	Bishop of Oloron; 1507–1519	Succeeded by Giovanni Salviati (Administrator)
