= Tructémonde (bishop of Oloron) =

French Catholic bishop

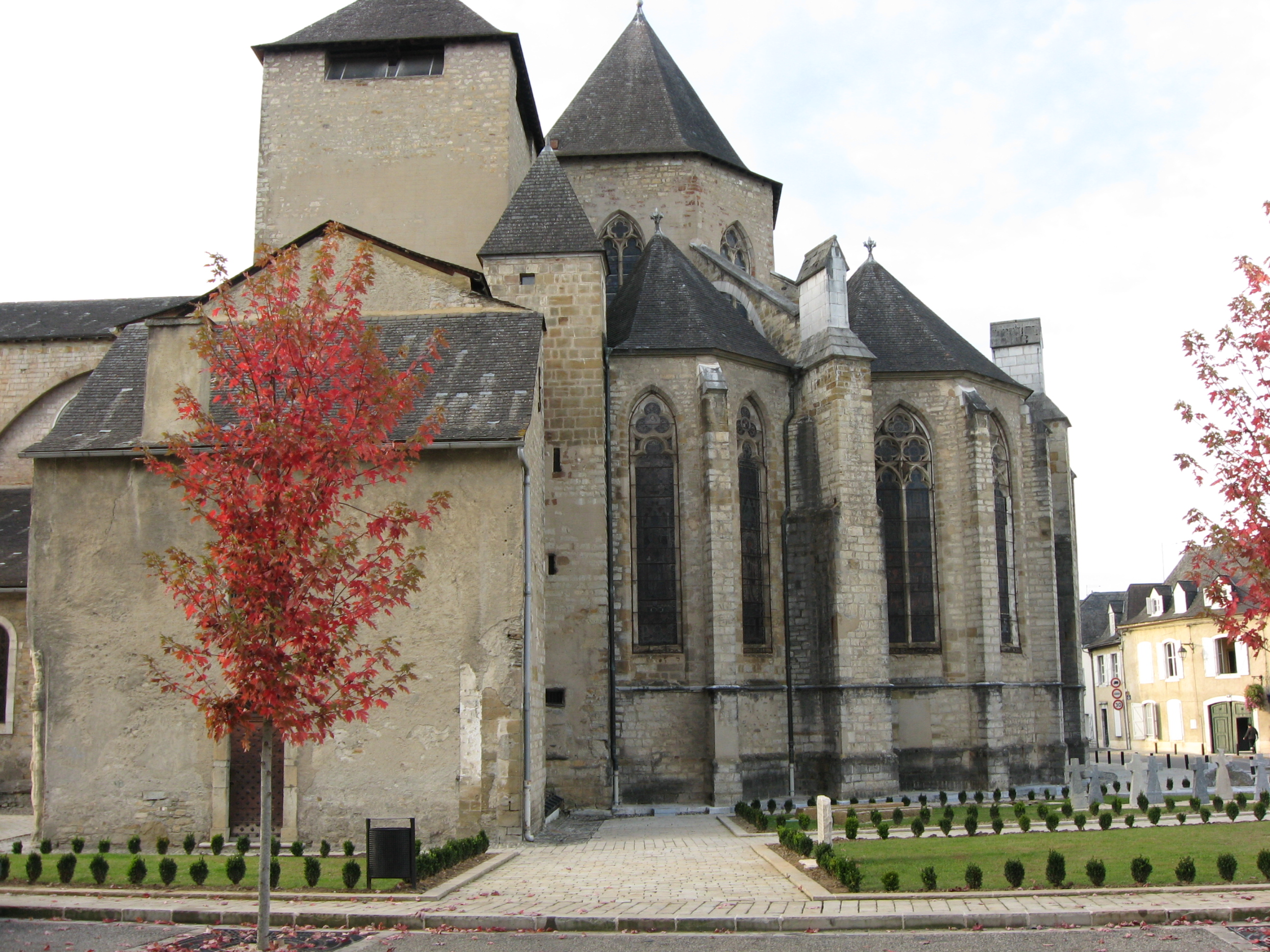
The former Oloron Cathedral, now St Mary's Church, Oloron

Tructémonde was a seventh-century Catholic Bishop of Oloron which is in France.

Although the seventh century was a formative time for the French state, the historical records of the time are sparse and little is known about his origins, career or his episcopal work other than he took the diocesan throne in 661.

Catholic Church titles
Preceded by Zozime	Bishop of Oloron c. 661–662	Succeeded by Arcontius
