= Amatus (archbishop of Bordeaux) =

French prelate, bishop and Papal Legate

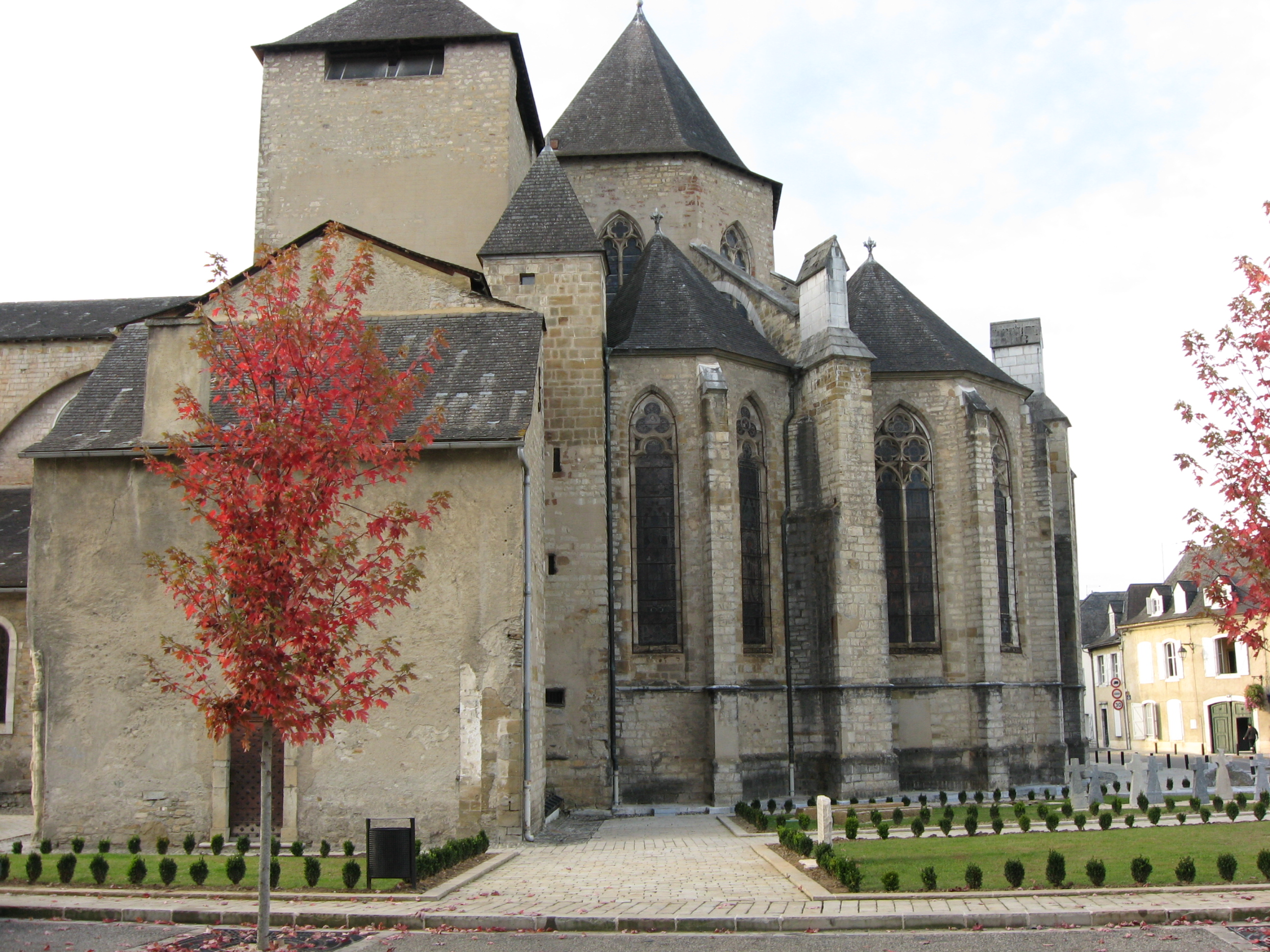
The former Oloron Cathedral, now St Mary's Church

Amatus was an eleventh-century French prelate, Catholic Bishop and Papal Legate.

== Life ==
He was appointed Catholic Bishop of Oloron from 1073 and Archbishop of Bordeaux from 1089 until 1101.

He was a Papal Legate for Pope Gregory VII going to Aquitaine in 1074 and Spain in 1077 Being a papal legate, he was therefore a strong supporter of Gregorys reform movement, instigating it in southern France, in partnership with Hugh of Die. He was also a fierce opponent of Berengar of Tours.

He was also a strong supporter of Church independence from civil authority, a supporter of Gregory during the Investiture Controversy and he pursued a policy of piety among the priesthood. At the Council of Rome, held in Lent 1076, he excommunicated several bishops accused of simony. He also presided over the ‘‘Council of Bordeaux’’ in 1080.

Catholic Church titles
Preceded by Etienne de Mauléon	Bishop of Oloron; 1083–1101	Succeeded by Odon de Bénac
