= Odon de Bénac =

French Catholic bishop

Odon de Bénac was an eleventh-century Catholic Bishop of Oloron in France.

The son of Count Raymond II of Bigorre, he was bishop from 1083AD to 1101AD.

Catholic Church titles
Preceded by Amat	Bishop of Oloron; 1083–1101	Succeeded by Roger I. de Sentes
