= Château de Faye (Flavignac) =

Building in France

Coordinates: 45.7150°N 1.0796°E

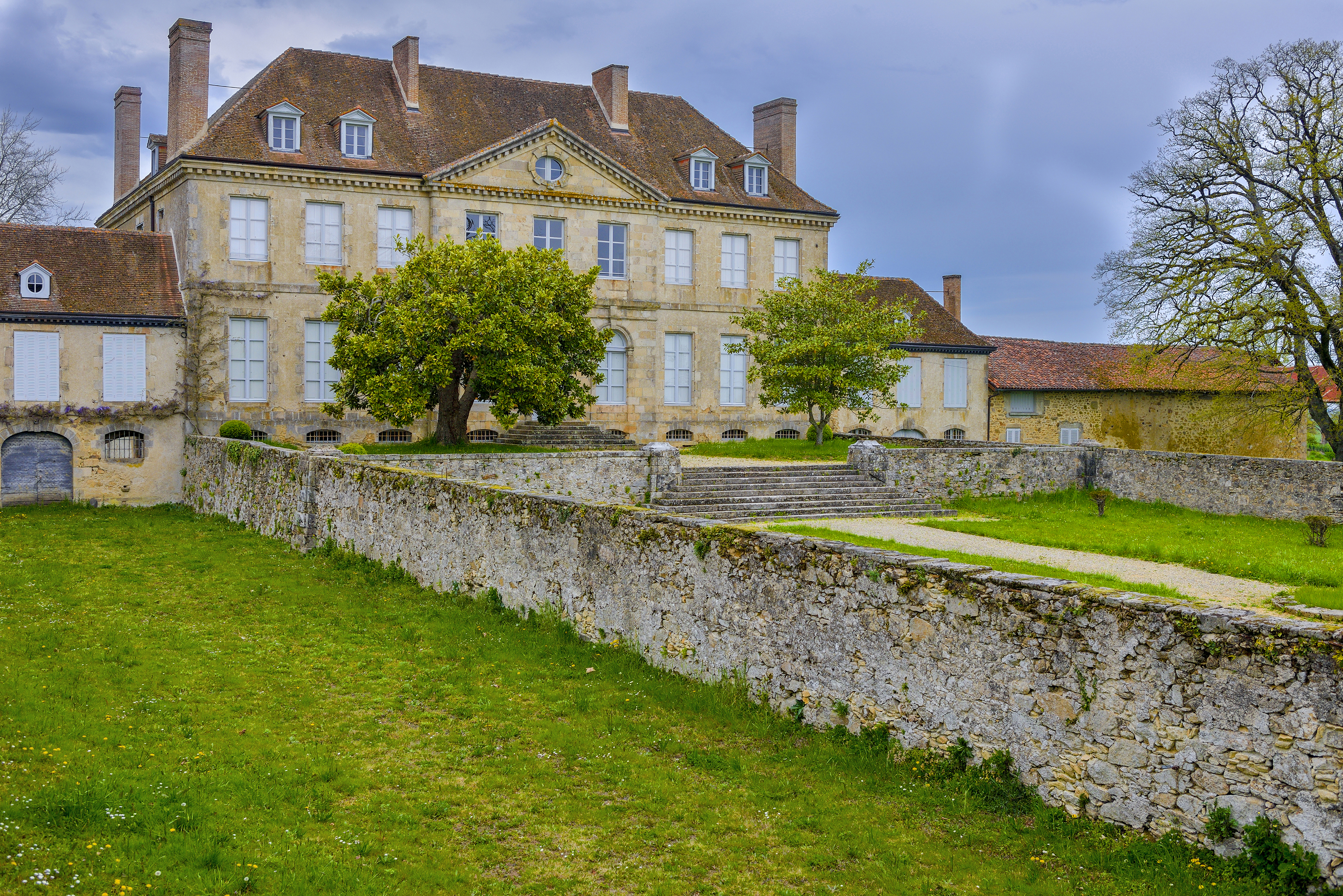
Le château de Faye, commune de Flavignac in 2016

The Château de Faye is a house located in the commune of Flavignac, in the Haute-Vienne département of France It has been owned by Philippe Rosier since 1997.

== History ==
From the 15th century, a manor house belonging to the Loménie family occupied the site until about 1690, when it passed to a relative Pierre de Loménie, who left it to Pierre de Villoutreys, his godson. The Villoutreys family lasted until Louis-Henri Gratz, who committed suicide in the house in 1811.

The property was sold in May 1812 and after two auctions, 112,100 gold francs to M. Léonard de Loménie, a member of the Loménie family who had previously owned the château.

In the 1950s, it was sold to the CGT union of Seine-Maritime and in the 1990s it was bought by its current owners who are undertaking external and internal restorations.

It has been listed since 2005 as a monument historique by the French Ministry of Culture.

== Architecture ==
The current château was built from 1782 to 1786 to a design by the architect Joseph Brousseau, as the old manor dating from the 15th-17th centuries was destroyed.

The new château, which was perhaps not fully completed at the time of the French Revolution, especially in its interiors, presents itself as a framed main building with two low wings. Its interior decorations (raised floor), in the Classical style, are quite beautiful and well-preserved. The interior with its wood panelling and sculptures in gilded wood is a registered historical monument.

A garden à la française, supplemented by a garden, accompanied the monument. The garden has two levels of rectangular terraces, a vegetable garden and an orchard are also registered historical monument. The garden to the east was transformed in the 19th century into a park.
