= Gratus of Oloron =

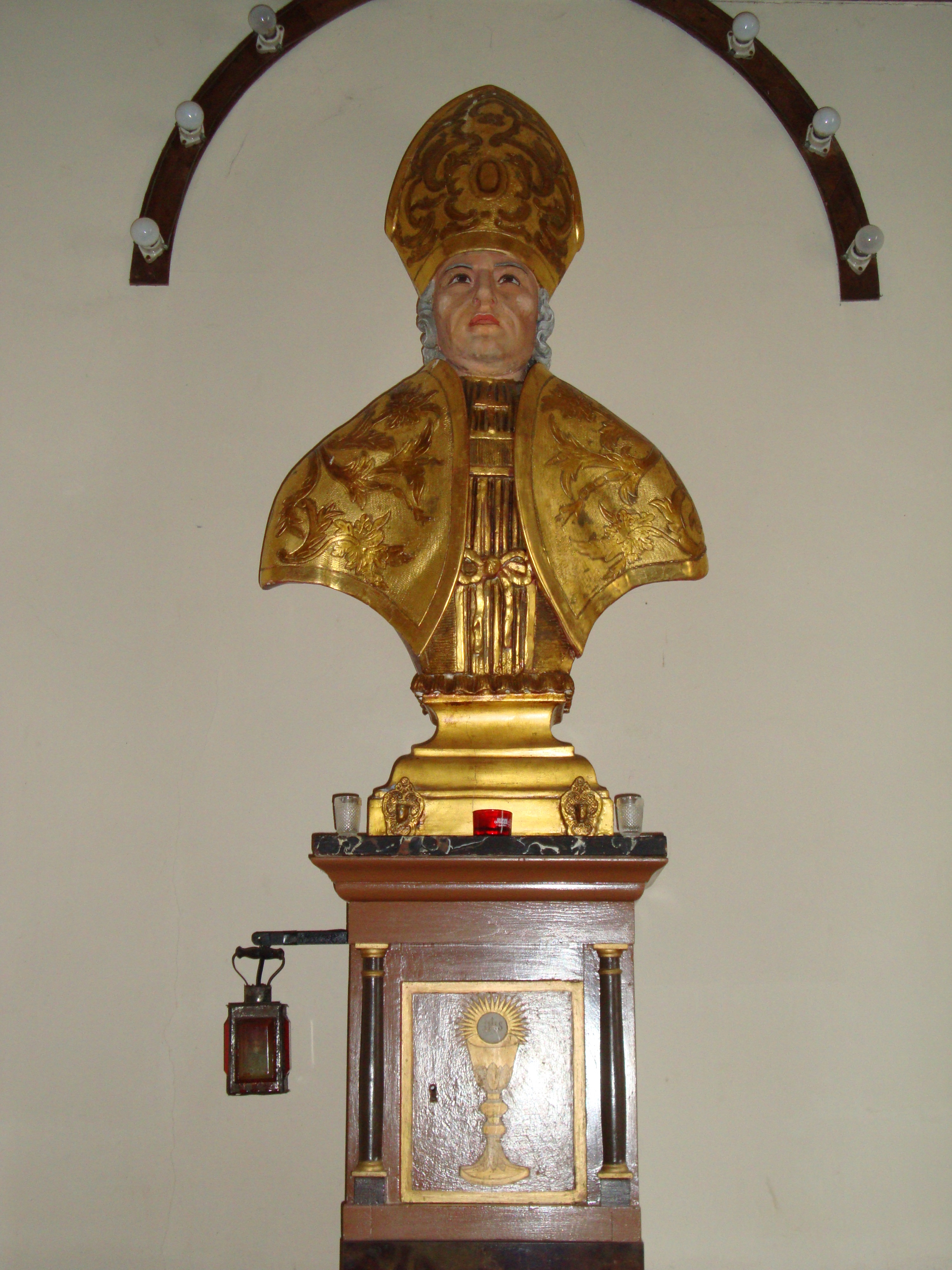
Bust of Saint Gratus of Oloron in the church dedicated to him at Lichos

Saint Gratus of Oloron (French: Grat d'Oloron; Catalan: Grat d'Auloron; also known, from his place of birth, as Grat de Lichos) (born 5th century; died after 506) was the first bishop of Oloron. He is venerated as a saint in the Eastern Orthodox Church and Roman Catholic Church.

== Life ==
He was born in the 5th century at Lichos, in the lower valley of the River Saison, into a Catholic family.

During his youth, Catholics were persecuted by the Arian Euric, king of the Visigoths (466-485). Euric's successor, Alaric II (485-507), was tolerant towards them, permitting among other things the creation of Catholic bishoprics, including that of Oloron, of which Gratus was the first bishop. He took part in the Council of Agde in 506, where 34 Catholic bishops of the Visigothic kingdom met under the chairmanship of Saint Caesarius of Arles.

In 507, the Visigoths were defeated by Clovis at the Battle of Vouillé. After the death of Clovis in 511, however, there was a still a strong Visigothic presence south of the Garonne (Aquitaine). Gratus is believed to have died at Jaca during this period, from where his body was retrieved and brought to its place of permanent rest in Oloron-Sainte-Marie.

His feast day is 11 October.

The Cathedral of Oloron-Sainte-Marie was decorated with five gilt and polychrome wooden panels depicting the scenes from the earth and heaven life of Saint Gratus

== Sources ==
- Nominis.fr: Saint Grat d'Oloron (in French)
- Vrais Chrétiens Orthodoxes Francophones: Grat de Lichos
