= Flavignac =

- Commune
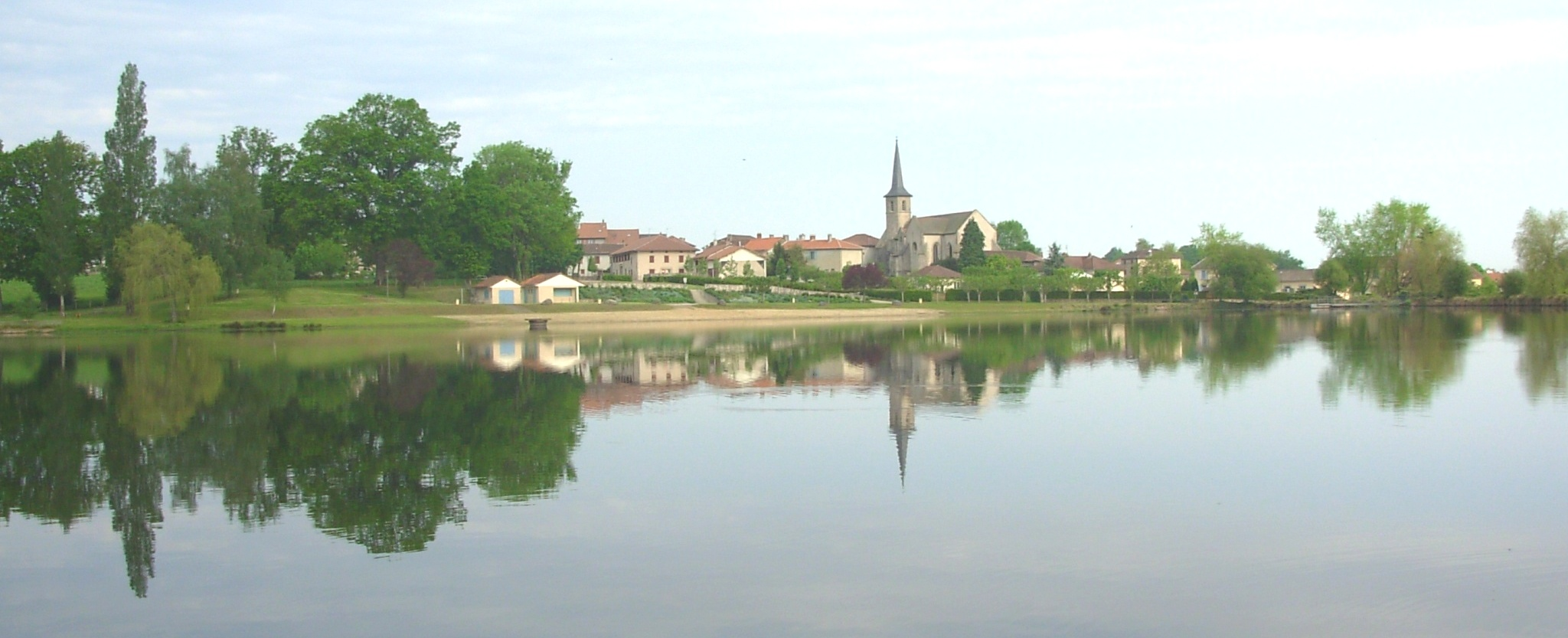
- Lake Saint Fortunat
- Location of Flavignac
- Location within France Location within Nouvelle-Aquitaine
- Coordinates: 45°42′19″N 1°05′35″E
- Country: France
- Region: Nouvelle-Aquitaine
- Department: Haute-Vienne
- Arrondissement: Limoges
- Canton: Saint-Yrieix-la-Perche
- Intercommunality: Pays de Nexon-Monts de Châlus

Government
  - Mayor (2020–2026): Christian Desroche
- Area^{1}: 30.79 km^{2} (11.89 sq mi)
- Highest elevation: 410 m (1,350 ft)
- Lowest elevation: 276 m (906 ft)
- Population (2023): 1,058
  - Density: 34.36/km^{2} (89.00/sq mi)
- Time zone: UTC+01:00 (CET)
  - Summer (DST): UTC+02:00 (CEST)
- INSEE/Postal code: 87066 /87230
- ^{1} French Land Register data, which excludes lakes, ponds, glaciers > 1 km^{2} (0.386 sq mi or 247 acres) and river estuaries.

Flavignac (French pronunciation: [flaviɲak]; Occitan: Flavinhac) is a commune in the Haute-Vienne department in the Nouvelle-Aquitaine region in west-central France.

The town is the location of Château de Faye and Inhabitants are known as Flavignacois.

== See also ==
- Communes of the Haute-Vienne department
