= Jacques de Foix =

French Catholic bishop

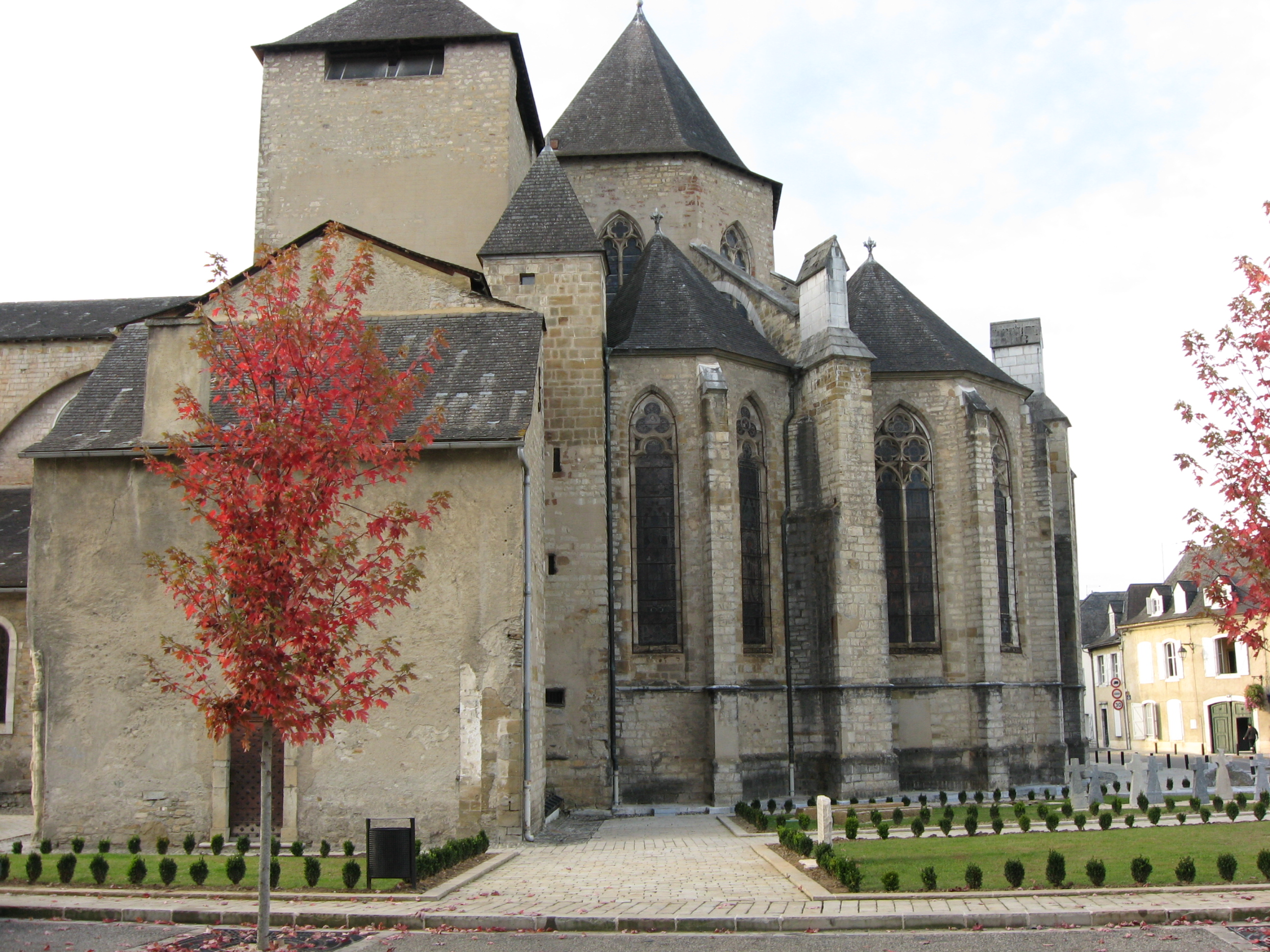
The former Oloron Cathedral, now St Mary's Church.

Jacques de Foix was a sixteenth century Catholic Bishop of Oloron and then Lescar, both in France.

== Early life ==
De Foix was the son of an unknown mistress and Jacques de Foix Infante de Navarra (1469-1500), Count de Montfort. He was a grandson of Gaston IV, Count of Foix and Eleanor of Navarre, monarch of the Kingdom of Navarre.

== Catholic bishop ==
He was Bishop of Oloron from 1521 until 1534 and Bishop of Lescar from 1534 until 1553. He probably died 7 Apr 1553.

== See also ==
- Catholic Church in France

Catholic Church titles
Preceded by Giovanni Salviati	Bishop of Oloron; 1521–1534	Succeeded by Gérard Roussel
