= Oloron Cathedral =

Roman Catholic Church and former cathedral

Coordinates: 43°11′16″N 0°36′58″W

Oloron Cathedral Cathédrale Sainte-Marie d'Oloron-Sainte-Marie
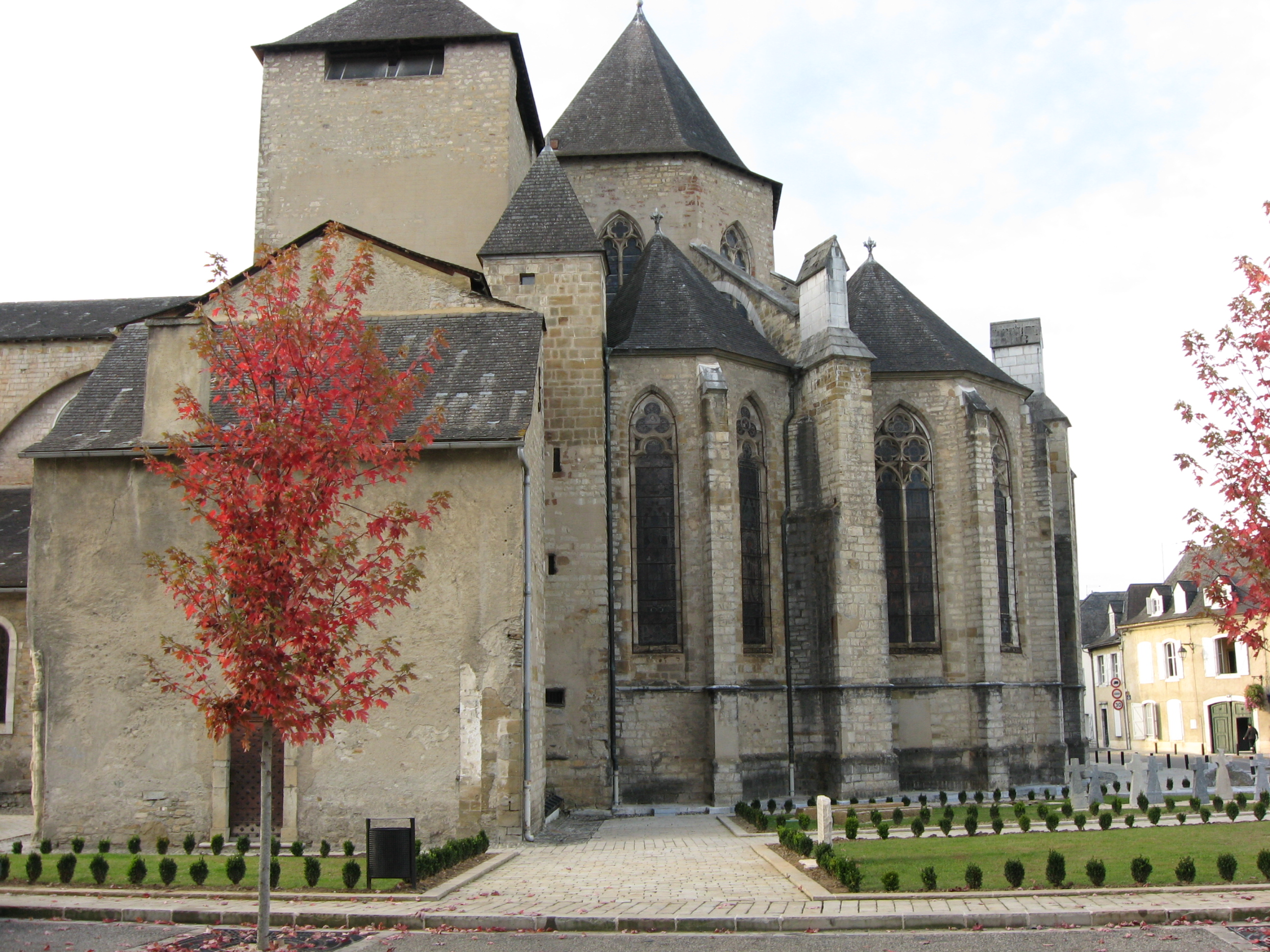
- The former Oloron Cathedral, now St. Mary's Church, Oloron

Religion
- Affiliation: Roman Catholic Church
- Province: Bishopric of Oloron
- Region: Pyrénées-Atlantiques
- Rite: Roman
- Ecclesiastical or organisational status: Cathedral
- Status: Active

Location
- Location: Oloron-Sainte-Marie, France
- Interactive map of Oloron Cathedral; Cathédrale Sainte-Marie d'Oloron-Sainte-Marie

Architecture
- Type: church
- Style: Romanesque, Gothic
- Groundbreaking: 12th century

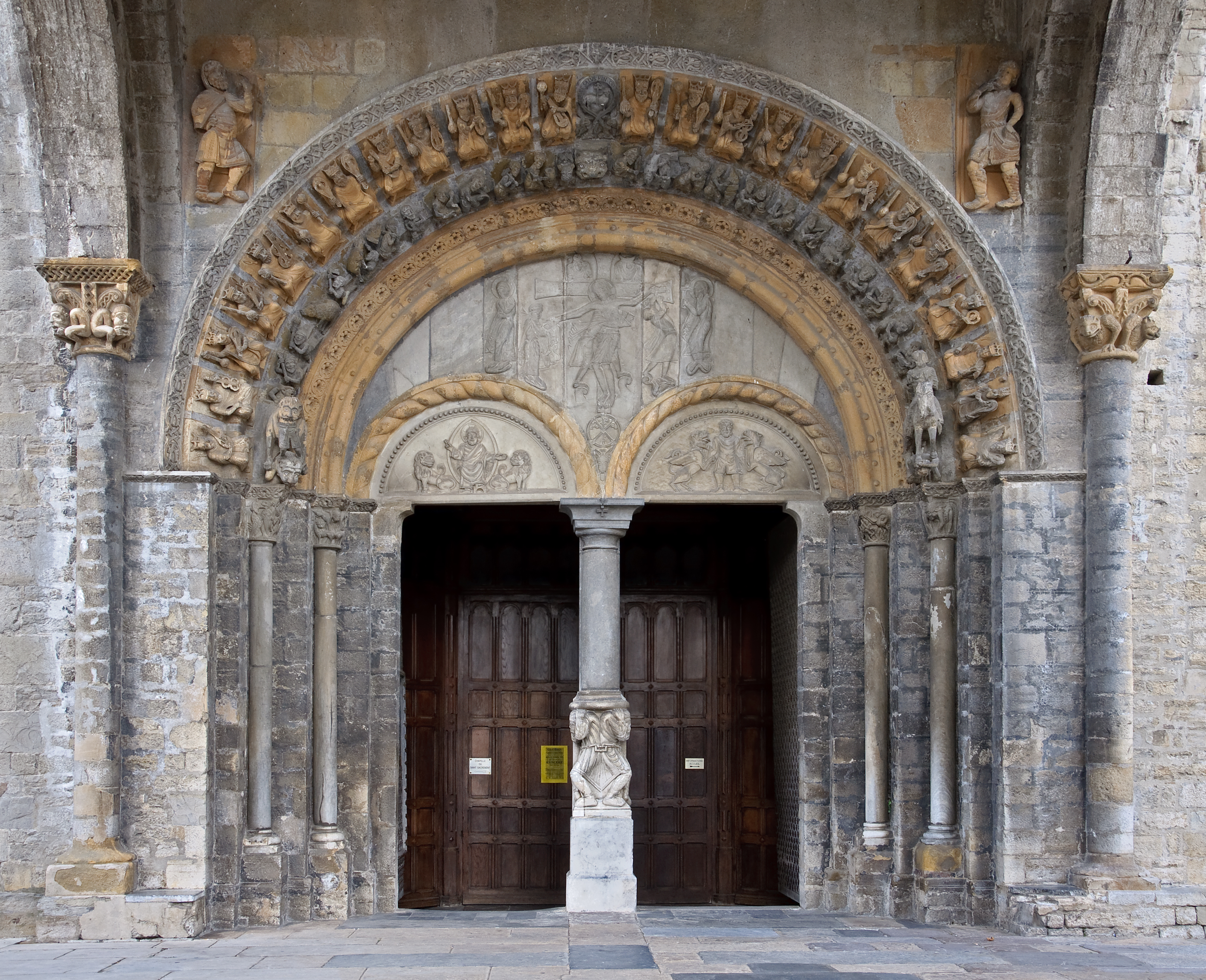
The Romanesque portal

Oloron Cathedral (French: Cathédrale Sainte-Marie d'Oloron-Sainte-Marie), now St. Mary's Church (French: Eglise Sainte-Marie), is a Roman Catholic church and former cathedral located in the town of Oloron-Sainte-Marie, in the Pyrénées-Atlantiques département of France. It is in the Romanesque and Gothic architectural traditions.

Construction was started in the 12th century by Gaston IV, Viscount of Béarn. It was the seat of the Bishopric of Oloron, suppressed by the Concordat of 1801.

It has been listed as a monument historique by the French Ministry of Culture since March 1939, and was named a World Heritage Site by UNESCO in 1998.
