= Diocese of Oloron =

Roman Catholic diocese in France (6th - 19th Century)

Coordinates: 43.19°N 0.62°W

The former Roman Catholic Diocese of Oloron was a Latin rite bishopric in Pyrénées-Atlantiques department, Aquitaine region of south-west France, from the 6th to the 19th century.

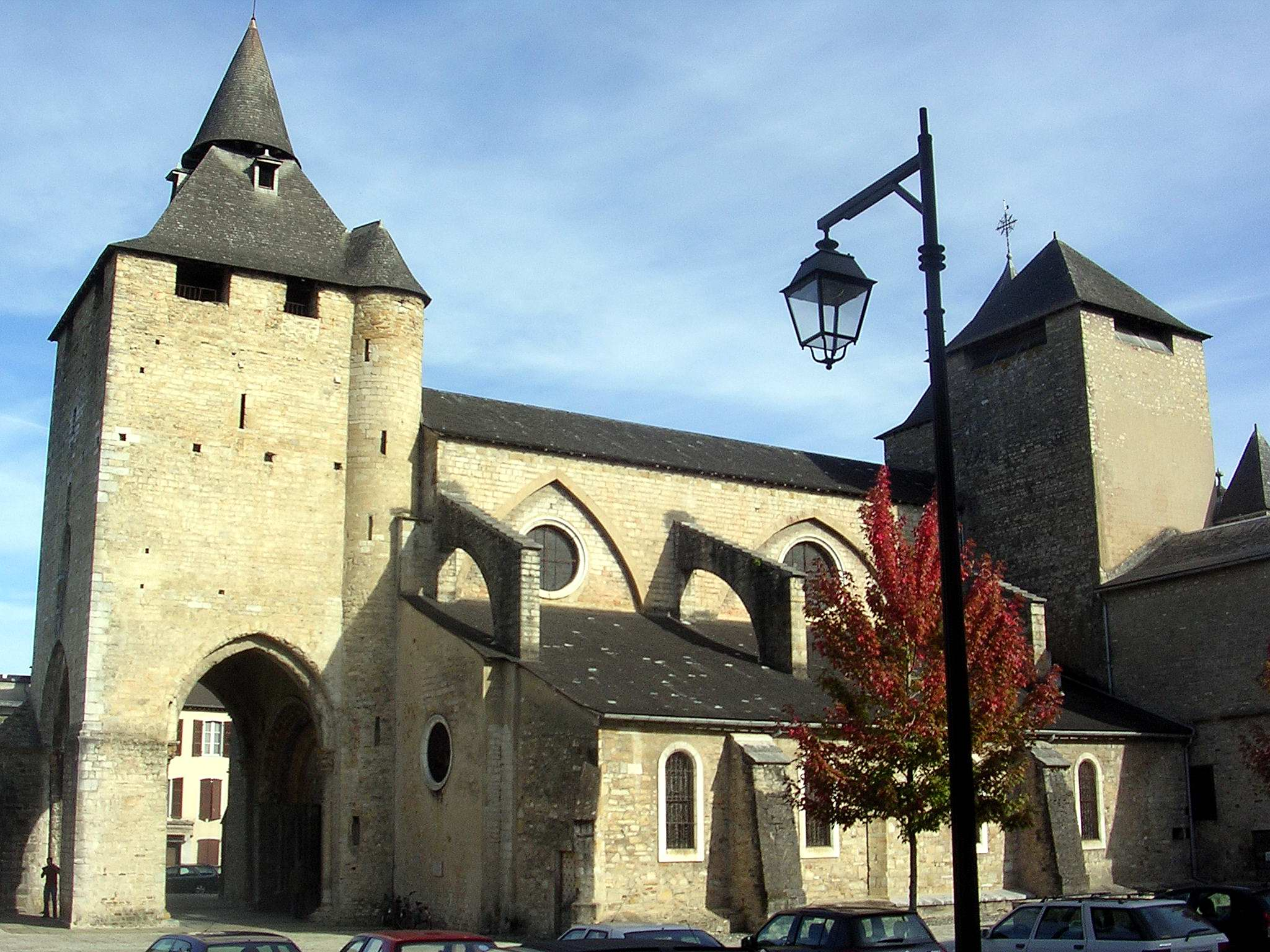
Former Oloron Cathedral

== History ==
The diocese of Oleron already existed in the 6th century, when Bishop Gratus attended the Council of Agde. The diocese of Oleron was a suffragan (provincial subordinate) to the Archdiocese of Eauze, holding the eighth place of nine, until Eauze was destroyed by the Normans around 845. It then became a suffragan of Auch, which was raised to the status of a metropolitan archbishopric in 847. For administrative purposes the diocese was subdivided (by the thirteenth century) into six archdeaconries, those of Oleron, Soule, Navarrenx, Garenz, Aspe, and Lasseube. The archdeaconries and archpriesthoods disappeared in the sixteenth century, when Béarn was protestantized by the official policy of the royal house of Navarre, especially by Jeanne d'Albret.

The bishops of Oleron were also seigneurs of the Barony of Moumour, thanks to the liberality of Gaston V, Viscount of Béarn (died 1170). During the 12th century, the bishops of Oleron became increasingly more involved in the ecclesiastical and feudal affairs of Béarn. The diocese expanded its temporal influence in the surrounding region, while Oleron remained an important centre of religious and political activity. This development continued into the early 13th century, when the bishops acquired the Barony of Moumour.

=== Cathedral Chapter ===
The Chapter of the Cathedral of Sainte-Marie was composed of twelve Canons and eight prebendaries. The Bishop and Chapter were jointly seigneurs of the town of Sainte-Marie, on the opposite bank of the river Gave from Oloron, where the episcopal palace was located.

There was also the Collegiate Church of Sainte-Engrâce, which had been founded in the mid-11th century. It had a Chapter composed of a Sacristan and twelve non-residential Canons.

=== Bishop and Papal Legate ===
Bishop Amatus (1073? – 1089), who had been a Benedictine monk, presided as Legate of Pope Gregory VII in a Council held at Poitiers on 26 May 1075, to deal with the marital irregularities of Count Guillaume of Poitou. He was also present, with the title of Legate, at the Council of Poitiers held by the Papal Legate Hugh of Die in 1078. He presided as Papal Legate at a Council held at Gerona in Aragon in 1078, and, again with Hugh de Die, at the Council of Bordeaux in December 1079. In December 1079 Pope Gregory VII appointed him Legate to Britain. On 6 October 1080, Amat and Hugh presided at another council at Bordeaux; and likewise in the same year at Saintes, and likewise on 27 March 1181 at Issoudun (Exoldunense). The reward for this very busy and loyal bishop was a promotion to the Archbishopric of Bordeaux (1089-1102).

=== Election of 1246 ===
Late in May or early in June 1246, the Canons of the Chapter of the Cathedral of Saint-Marie assembled, and in accordance with canon law conducted an election by scrutiny for a new bishop. Everyone finally agreed on Pierre de Gavarret, who held the office of Sacristan in the Cathedral Chapter of Vic. They immediately notified Pope Innocent IV, who was staying at Lyon at that time, and drew his attention to the Elect's sterling qualities, but also to the fact that the bishop-elect was not eligible for the office super natalium defectu (illegitimacy). The Chapter requested that the Pope dispense Pierre from this obstacle to his promotion. The Pope appointed a committee of three bishops, the Archbishop of Auch and the bishops of Lascar and Dax (Aquensis), to inquire into the canonical form of the election, the behavior of the petitioners, and the merits of the Elect. They were to inform the Pope immediately of their findings, which they did, and which were all positive. On 14 July 1246 Pope Innocent provided the necessary dispensation and the mandate to the Archbishop to consecrate Pierre de Gavarret as Bishop of Oloron. On 27 June 1246 he notified the Chapter that he had approved their petition.

=== Election of 1308 ===
The episcopal election of 1308 produced a scandal of major proportions in southern France. Guillaume Arnaudi, called Dodaus, had apparently been elected by the Canons of the Cathedral Chapter. His election was notified to the Metropolitan, Archbishop Armanevus of Auch, who announced a day by which any opponent of the election might present any evidence he wished. One of the clergy of Oloron, Arnaldus Guillelmi de Mirateug, went in person to Auch, armed with documents and petitions, intending to persuade the archbishop not to ratify the election. Bishop-elect Guillaume Arnaudi was accused of having some of his friends seize and detain Arnaldus for some time. When he was released, he was not able to gain admission to the Archbishop (the Bishop-elect's enemies said). He then went to the cathedral, and harangued a crowd of clergy and people to persuade them to oppose the confirmation of the bishop-elect. Certain clergy and Canons of the cathedral made off with his documentary evidence (it was said), and tried to expel him from the cathedral or even kill him. The Archbishop, on account of the uproar, was not willing to proceed with a confirmation, and secretly entrusted the matter to a committee of clerics. He then left the city and took up residence in a castle some two leagues away. Arnaldus, however, pursued the archbishop, and eventually got an interview; he presented his criminal charges, and to prevent the confirmation of the election, he appealed to the Pope. The Archbishop in reply issued the confirmation, despite the existence of the investigatory committee.

The entire affair was reported at a papal audience by Garsias Arnaldi, lord of Novaliis, who laid charges of simony, homicide, perjury, public money-lending, and living in concubinage. Pope Clement, who wished to know the truth of the dispute, sent a mandate on 10 August 1308 to the Bishop of Tarbes (Gerold Doucet), whom he trusted, to make a thorough investigation of the affair, and if he were to find anything amiss, to cite the Bishop-elect, Guillaume Arnaudi, to the Papal Court, and give him three months to appear personally. Nothing more is known, beyond the Pope's letter, except that Guillaume Arnaudi was confirmed as bishop of Oloron. He appears as confirmatus et electus in a charter of Count Gaston de Foix, dated the Wednesday after the Feast of Notre-Dame (8 September) 1308.

=== Election of 1342 ===
Another difficult election followed the death of Bishop Arnaud de Valensun in 1341. The Chapter of the Cathedral proceeded to the usual election, and chose Petrus de Capite-pontis, but Petrus refused the election. At that point Pope Benedict XII intervened and decided to reserve the appointment to his own judgment. The Chapter, however, perhaps in ignorance or perhaps to assert its traditional rights, proceeded to a second election, of Arnaud de Cadalhono. When the election was referred to Avignon for papal confirmation and bulls, Benedict XII quashed the election, on the grounds that he had already reserved the appointment. On 4 March 1342 he appointed Bernard d'En Julia, the Prior of the Priory of Saint-Christine (diocese of Oloron).

=== The Great Western Schism ===
During the Western Schism (1378–1417) the kings of England supported the Roman Obedience, at least until 1408, when they sent official delegates to the Council of Pisa (March–August 1409), while the kings of France, Aragon, and Castile supported the Avignon Obedience. Oloron, which was the feudal property of the Counts of Foix, who were also Vicomtes of Béarn, found itself in the middle of the dispute. Gaston III, Count of Foix and Vicomte de Béarn, attempted to please both sides. The chronicler Jean Froissart recalls a Christmas dinner at the court of Foix in 1388, in which the Count entertained two bishops of the Avignon Obedience, those of Pamiers and Lascar, and two bishops of the Roman Obedience, those of Aire and of Oleron. The bishops of the Roman Obedience were Pierre de Monbrun (and Pierre Salet). The bishops of the Avignon Obedience were Orgier de Villesonques, Sance le Moine, Arnaud de Buzy, Pierre Lafargue, and Sance Muller.

=== Protestantism ===
Huguenot control (purple) and influence (violet), 16th century

In July 1566, Queen Jeanne d'Albret issued a set of twenty-three Ordonnances ecclésiastiques. These allowed only one synod a year, at the call of the Lieutenant General of the realm (who, at the time, was the Bishop of Oleron, Claude Régin). The subject of marriage was reserved to the Queen. Dancing was forbidden. Prostitutes were banned. Priests and monks were forbidden to beg (mendier). Public religious processions were forbidden. The youth were to be educated at the Collège d'Orthez (a Protestant institution). Protestant ministers were permitted to preach and pray in any place in the kingdom, and Catholic clergy were forbidden to interfere in such sermons and prayers. Roman Catholic persons were forbidden to preach in any place in the country. Burial inside a church was forbidden, but were to take place only in cemeteries and without ceremonies or prayers. Catholic priests were forbidden to return to places which had been taken over by the Protestant religion. Benefices were to be suppressed on the death or resignation of the incumbent, and the money applied to poor relief of members of the Reformed Church. Bishops and others were forbidden to confer benefices (collation), except where they were the lay patron. On her return from Paris in December 1566, Queen Jeanne appointed commissioners to carry out the destruction of images and altars.

At Easter 1567, there was an uprising of Catholics at Oloron, led by the Abbot of Sauvelade. And at the Estates of Béarn, which opened on 29 July 1567, the delegates, led by Bishop Claude Régin, petitioned the Queen to revoke her ordinances of July 1566.

At the Estates of April 1568, the Bishop of Oleron was not permitted to participate, nor were some of the nobility and many of the Third Estate. Despite repeated Catholic protests, the carefully selected Protestant majority passed resolutions accepting the disputed ordinances of 1566.

On 28 January 1570, by order of Queen Jeanne d'Albret, the Catholic religion was abolished in Béarn. "We [Seneschals and Lieutenants General], following the will of God and of the aforesaid Lady [Jeanne d'Albret]... have annulled, expelled, and banned from this land every exercise of the Roman religion without any exception, such as masses, processions. litanies, Matins, Vespers, Complines, vigils, feasts, vows, pilgrimages, painted images or images made of wood, votive lights, flowers, candles, the cross...."

Jeanne d'Albret died on 9 June 1572. The Saint Bartholomew's Day massacres began on 24 August 1572.

At Lescar, nine Canons of the Cathedral Chapter were killed, and three went over to Protestantism. At Oleron, two priests were massacred by Huguenot mobs, and half of the monks and nuns fled to Spain while the rest were killed. The convent of the Capuchins was destroyed.

The Bishop of Oleron and the Canons of the Cathedral took refuge in Mauléon, where they continued their capitular offices. Bishop Régin, who was living on a small pension from the King of France, became seriously ill in 1582 in Mauleon, but he recovered. But he was pursued by the Protestants of Béarn, who sacked his house. He left Mauléon and sought refuge in Vendôme, where he died in 1593.

=== End of the diocese ===
During the French Revolution the diocese of Oloron was suppressed by the Legislative Assembly, under the Civil Constitution of the Clergy (1790). Its territory was subsumed into the new diocese, called 'Basses-Pyrenees', which was coterminous with the new civil department of the same name. The dioceses of Bayonne and Lescar were also suppressed and their bishops dismissed, and their territories were joined to the former diocese of Oleron, with the seat of the Constitutional Diocese at Oloron. Basses-Pyrenees was made part of the Metropolitanate called the 'Métropole du Sud'.

The new Civil Constitution mandated that bishops be elected by the citizens of each 'département', which immediately raised the most severe issues in Canon Law, since the electors did not need to be Catholics and the approval of the Pope was not only not required, but actually forbidden. Erection of new dioceses and transfer of bishops, moreover, was not canonically in the competence of civil authorities or of the Church in France. The result was schism between the 'Constitutional Church' and the Roman Catholic Church.

All monasteries, convents and religious orders in France were dissolved, and their members were released from their vows by order of the National Constituent Assembly (an act which was uncanonical); their property was confiscated "for the public good", and sold to pay the bills of the French government. Cathedral Chapters were also dissolved.

The legitimate bishop of Oloron, Jean-Baptiste-Auguste de Villoutreix, was in Paris when the Civil Constitution was enacted on 27 July 1790. He declined to take the required oath to the Civil Constitution, and instead wrote a monitory letter to the clergy of his diocese on 22 February 1791, encouraging them to resist. He then fled to England where he died in March 1792. The diocese was not reestablished after the French Revolution, and the Napoleonic Concordat of 1801. From the point of view of Canon Law, it was Pope Pius VII's bull Qui Christi Domini of 29 November 1801, which reestablished the dioceses of France, that did not restore Oleron. Its territory was merged into the Diocese of Bayonne.

On 22 June 1909, however, the title, though not the diocese, was revived along with that of the former Diocese of Lescar, and assigned as titles of the successor Diocese of Bayonne; the former cathedrals of the former dioceses did not obtain the status of a co-cathedral. This change was purely decorative, involving no change in the life of the diocese.

One of the branches of the pilgrimage route called The Way of St James passes through Oloron on its way to Santiago in Galicia.

== Notable buildings ==
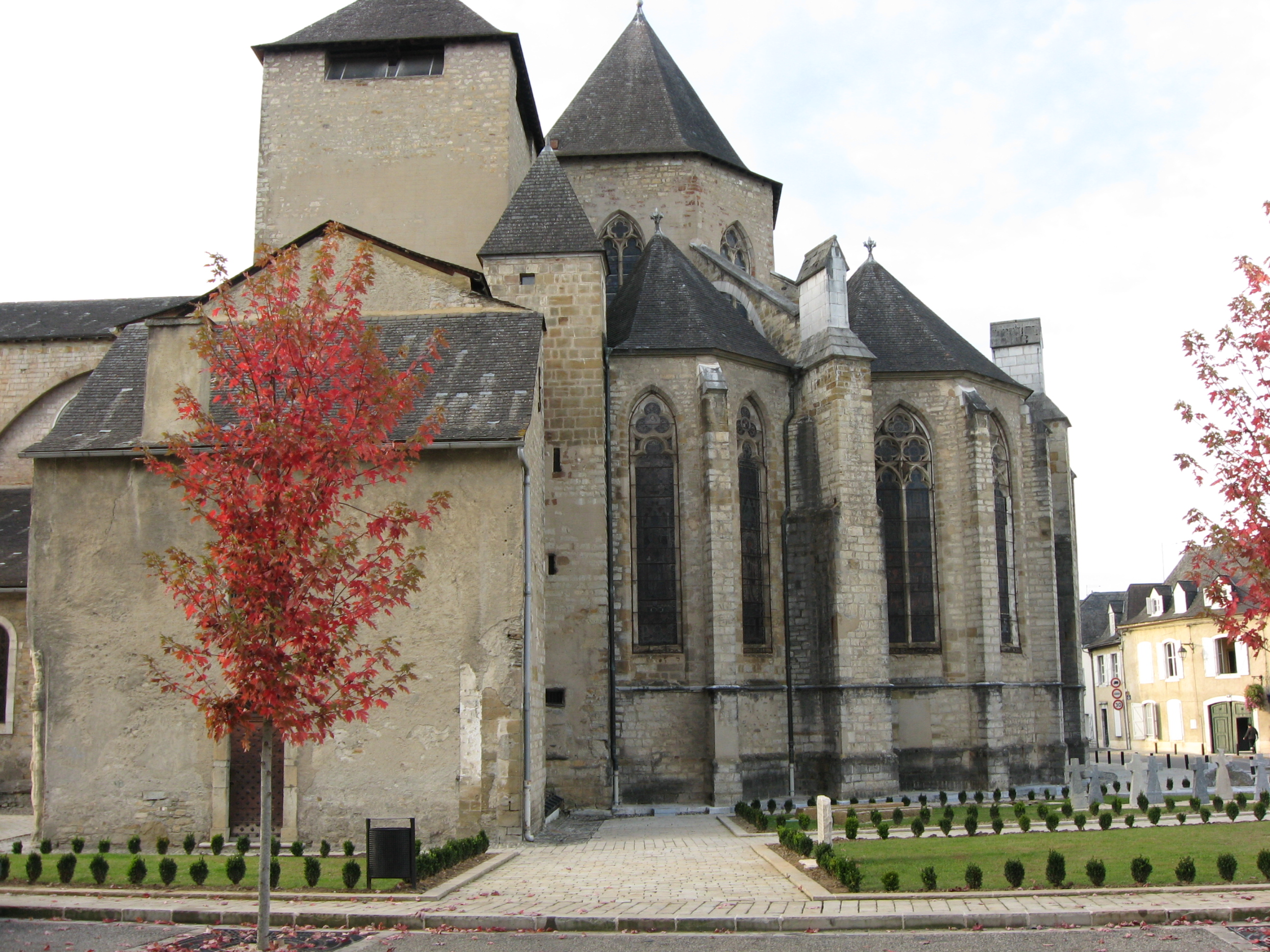
The gothic apse of the former Oloron Cathedral, now St Mary's Church.

=== Cathedral ===
The episcopal see of the bishops of Oloron was in the Cathédrale Sainte-Marie, dedicated to the Virgin Mary, in Oloron-Sainte-Marie, in the department of Pyrénées-Atlantiques. The former cathedral has now reverted to the status of a parish church, and is called the Ancienne cathédrale Sainte-Marie.

=== Chateau de Lamothe ===
Another significant building is Chateau de Lamothe, dating from the early 12th century, when a Moorish fortification on the hill, was destroyed as the French drove the Moorish forces from France, and rebuilt to serve as the summer residence for the bishops of Oloron, a role it filled for 600 years.

=== Seminary ===
The collège-seminaire Oleron-Sainte-Marie was founded in 1708 by Bishop Joseph de Révol, and was entrusted to priests of the Barnabite Order of the Congregation of Saint-Paul de Lascar. They fell into disfavor, however, and in 1768 Bishop François de Révol remarked that they had not talent for bringing up young ecclesiastics. In 1776 he began the process for expelling them and replacing them with diocesan priests. His successor, Jean-Baptiste-Auguste de Villoutreix, continued the policy, and appointed a new principal, Barthelelmy Bover, who was a doctor of the Sorbonne. In 1791, when the oath of allegiance to the Civil Constitution of the Clergy was demanded of all the teachers, they refused and the seminary was closed.

== Bishops ==
All of the printed lists of bishops are unreliable, down to 1500, both in names and dates. The absence of documents allowed for a great deal of creative reconstruction.

=== Early Bishops of Oleron ===
- Gratus of Oloron (attested 506)

Agustius

- Licerius (attested 573 to c. 585)
- Helarianus (attested 614)
- Artemon (attested 673/675)

==== Bishops without name of See, or unattested ====
These bishops are rejected by Saine-Marthe, Gams, and Duchesne, as well as by Canon Dubarat.

Abientius (c. 653)
c. 659: Zozime
c. 661: Tructémonde
c. 668: Arcontius

c. 850: Gérard
'Basque' Episcopi Vasconiensis :

Gombaldus = Gombaud (mentioned in 977)
Arsius Raca (c. 977 - mentioned in 982)
Raymond I le Vieux (1033 – deposed 1050)

=== Bishops of Oleron, from 1060 to 1400 ===
- Etienne de Mauléon (1060 – after 1068)
- Amatus, O.S.B. (1073? – 1089)
- Odon de Bénac (c.1095 – 1101?)
- Roger I de Sentes/Saintes (1102 – 1114)
- Arnaud I d'Araux (1114 – 1147)
- Arnaud II d'Izeste, O.S.B. (1147 – 1168)
- Bernard I de Sadirac (1168 – 1192)
- Bernard II de Morlanne (1192 – 1223)

[Bernard III (1225)]

- ? R. (de Massanc) (c. 1231)
- Guillaume de Castanet (1228–1241)
- Pierre de Gavarret (1246 – 1254)
- G[uillaume II de Gaujac] (death 1255)
- R. (1256–1259)
- Compaing (c. October 1260 – 1283)
- Bernard IV de La Mothe (1284–1288)
- Gérard (Gaillardus, Guillard) de Leduix (30 April 1289 - death 1308)
- Guillaume Arnaud (10 August 1308 – 1322)

Raymond de Saint-Sever, O.S.B. Clun. (mentioned in 1309)

- Arnaud de Valensun (1323?24 – 1341)
- Bernard V d'En Julia, C.R.S.A. (4 March 1342 - death 1345? 1347)
- Bernard de Richano, O.F.M. (? – 1348)
- Pierre II d'Estiron (1348–1370)
- Guillaume III d'Assat (1371 – c. 1380)
- Ogier de Villesangues (1380? – 1396?) (Avignon Obedience)
- Arnaud Guillaume de Buzy (November 1396? – 1399?) (Avignon Obedience)

=== from 1400 to 1600 ===
- Pierre Laforgue/Lafargue (?1400 - ?1403) (Avignon Obedience)
- Pierre de Montbrun (? – 1404/1407) (Roman Obedience)
- Sance Muller, O.P. (1406 - 7 February 1418) (Avignon Obedience)
- Pierre de Limoges, O.E.S.A. (14 February 1418 - 23 August 1419)
- Garsias Arnaud (6 September 1419 - 1425)
- Gérard II d'Araux (d'Orbignac) (5 December 1425 - 1434)
- Arnaud-Raymond I d'Espagne (1 October 1434 - 5 July 1451)
- Beltrandus (5 July 1451 – before 20 September 1451)
- Guillaume de Fordera (20 September 1451 – 1465)
- Garsias II. de La Mothe (24 July 1466 – 1474)
- Sance de Casenave (8 December 1475 – 1491)

Pierre de Fabrique (Vicar Capitular)
Antoine de Corneilhan
Cosmas dei Pazzi (10 December 1492 – 17 April 1497) (Bishop-elect)
Cardinal Juan López (17 April 1497 – 1498) (Administrator)

- 1498–1499: Jean de Pardailhan

Amanieu d'Albret (15 May 1500 – ?) (Administrator)

- 1506–1519: Arnaud-Raymond II de Béon

Cardinal Giovanni Salviati (1521 – 1523) (Administrator)

- Jacques de Foix (18 March 1523 – 13 November 1534)
- Pierre d'Albret (13 November 1534 – 6 September 1535)
- 1539–1555: Gérard Roussel
- 1550–1593: Claude Orégon (Régin)

Sede Vacante (1593 – 1599)

=== from 1600 ===
- 1599–1620: Arnaud IV. de Maytie
- 1620–1646: Arnaud V de Maytie

[1647: Louis de Bassompierre]

- 1648–1652: Pierre V de Gassion
- 1652–1658: Jean de Miossens-Sansons
- 1659–1681: Arnaud-François de Maytie
- 1682–1704: François Charles de Salettes

1705: Antoine de Maigny

- 1705–1735: Joseph de Révol
- 1735–1742: Jean-François de Montillet de Grenaud
- 1742–1783: François de Révol
- 1783–1790: Jean-Baptiste-Auguste de Villoutreix

Constitutional Church

- 26 April 1791 − 1793: Barthélémy-Jean-Baptiste Sanadon

== See also ==
- Catholic Church in France

== Sources and external links ==
- GCatholic - former bishopric
- GCatholic - Former Cathedral of St. Mary Major

== Bibliography ==
=== Reference works ===
- Gams, Pius Bonifatius (1873). Series episcoporum Ecclesiae catholicae: quotquot innotuerunt a beato Petro apostolo. Ratisbon: Typis et Sumptibus Georgii Josephi Manz. (Use with caution; obsolete)
- Eubel, Conradus, ed. (1913). Hierarchia catholica, Tomus 1 (second ed.). Münster: Libreria Regensbergiana. (in Latin)
- Eubel, Conradus, ed. (1914). Hierarchia catholica, Tomus 2 (second ed.). Münster: Libreria Regensbergiana. (in Latin)
- Gulik, Guilelmus (1923). Eubel, Conradus (ed.). Hierarchia catholica, Tomus 3 (second ed.). Münster: Libreria Regensbergiana.
- Gauchat, Patritius (Patrice) (1935). Hierarchia catholica IV (1592-1667). Münster: Libraria Regensbergiana.
- Ritzler, Remigius; Sefrin, Pirminus (1952). Hierarchia catholica medii et recentis aevi V (1667-1730). Patavii: Messagero di S. Antonio.
- Ritzler, Remigius; Sefrin, Pirminus (1958). Hierarchia catholica medii et recentis aevi VI (1730-1799). Patavii: Messagero di S. Antonio.

=== Studies ===
- Cadier, Albert; Boissonas, Georges (1913). Le protestantisme à Oloron-Ste-Marie, 1536-1912 (in French). Oloron: Au Foyer de la fraternité. [apologetic for Protestants]
- Dubarat, V. (1887). "Notices historiques sur les évêques de l'ancien diocèse d'Oloron, 506–1792". Bulletin de la Société des sciences, lettres et arts de Pau. 2 serie (in French). Vol. Tome 17. Pau. 1887. pp. 37–128. [Dubarat's dates often do not accord with documentary evidence.]
- Dubarat, Victor (1895). Le protestantisme en Béarn et au pays basque, ou Observations critiques sur l'Histoire de l'église réformée d'Osse de M. le pasteur A. Cadier (in French). Pau: Vigancour-S. Dufau. [apologetic for Catholics, polemical]
- Duchesne, Louis (1910). Fastes épiscopaux de l'ancienne Gaule: II. L'Aquitaine et les Lyonnaises. Paris: Fontemoing.
- Du Tems, Hugues (1774). Le clergé de France, ou tableau historique et chronologique des archevêques, évêques, abbés, abbesses et chefs des chapitres principaux du royaume, depuis la fondation des églises jusqu'à nos jours (in French). Vol. Tome premier. Paris: Delalain.
- Jean, Armand (1891). Les évêques et les archevêques de France depuis 1682 jusqu'à 1801 (in French). Paris: A. Picard. p. 78.
- Marca, Pierre de (1640). Histoire de Béarn (in French). Paris: chez la Veuve Jean Camusat.
- Marca, Pierre de (1894). V. Dubarat (ed.). Histoire du Béarn ... Nouvelle édition ... avec la vie de Marca (in French). Vol. Tome premier (nouvelle ed.). Pau: Ribaut.
- Menjoulet, J.-Maximien (1864). Chronique du diocèse et du pays d'Oloron (Béarn méridional et Soule). Vol. Tome premier. Oloron: M. Marque. - Maximien Menjoulet, J. (1869). Tome second.
- Pisani, Paul (1907). Répertoire biographique de l'épiscopat constitutionnel (1791-1802) (in French). Paris: A. Picard et fils.
- Sainte-Marthe, Denis de (1715). Gallia Christiana, In Provincias Ecclesiasticas Distributa (in Latin). Vol. Tomus primus. Paris: Johannes-Baptista Coignard. pp. 1264–1282, Instrumenta, pp. 197–198.
