= Juan López (cardinal) =

Spanish Roman Catholic bishop

Juan López (died 1501) (called the Cardinal of Perugia or the Cardinal of Capua) was a Spanish Roman Catholic bishop and cardinal.

== Biography ==
Juan López was born in Valencia, ca. 1455. He obtained a bachelor's degree in Christian theology.

By 1475, López had moved to Rome and joined the household of Cardinal Roderic Llançol i de Borja (the future Pope Alexander VI), eventually becoming the cardinal's secretary. By 1481, he was abbreviatore di parco minore. On 4 February 1484, he became a canon of the cathedral chapter of Valencia Cathedral, and, on 8 February 1484, of La Seu Vella. He later became a canon of St. Peter's Basilica. He served as one of Cardinal Borja's conclavists at the papal conclave of 1484 that elected Pope Innocent VIII. During the pontificate of Pope Innocent VIII, he was dean of the cathedral chapter of Valencia Cathedral. He was a papal datary from August 1492 until February 1496.

On 29 December 1492 he was elected Bishop of Perugia. In 1493, he refuted the accusations that the majordomo of Ferdinand II of Aragon made against Pope Alexander VI, with the result that the pope made him papal secretary on 25 December 1493. In December 1494, the pope asked him to intervene in the pope's conflict with Cardinal Ascanio Sforza. Following the 1495 invasion of the Papal States by Charles VIII of France as part of the Italian War of 1494–1498, the pope sent Bishop López to negotiate with representatives of the French king.

In the consistory of 19 February 1496 Pope Alexander VI made López a cardinal priest. He received the red hat and the titular church of Santa Maria in Trastevere on 24 February 1496.

On 23 December 1497 he became apostolic administrator of the see of Carcassonne, a post he occupied until his death. He was promoted to the position of Archbishop of Capua on 15 October 1498, though he was allowed to maintain the see of Perugia in commendam; he occupied the metropolitan see of Capua until his death.

He was present with the pope in January 1499, when he was threatened by the ambassadors of the Catholic Monarchs and of Manuel I of Portugal. He became archdeacon of St Paul's Cathedral in London on 4 November 1499. He was the Camerlengo of the Sacred College of Cardinals from January 1501 until his death. He was also archpriest of St. Peter's Basilica from 11 May 1501 until his death.

He died in the Apostolic Palace on 5 August 1501. He is buried in St. Peter's Basilica.

Catholic Church titles
| Preceded by Bartolomeo Martini (1499) | Camerlengo of the Sacred College of Cardinals; 1501 | Succeeded by Francisco de Borja (1503) |
