= Pierre d'Amboise =

French nobleman

The family arms of Amboise

Pierre d'Amboise (1408 – 28 June 1473) was a French nobleman of the House of Amboise. He was a son of Hugh VIII of Amboise, who was killed at the battle of Agincourt, and of Jeanne de Guénand.

== Titles and offices ==
- Conseiller and chamberlain to Charles VII.
- Governor of Touraine.
- Louis XI's ambassador to Rome.
- Lord of Chaumont, Meillant, Sagonne, Les Rochettes, Asnières (in Blésois), Saint-Vérain, Bussy, Preuilly, Les Bordes-Guénand, Moulins, Charenton, etc.
- With his cousin Louis d'Amboise, he fought alongside Joan of Arc at the Siege of Orléans (January 1429).
- He participated in the "Praguerie" under the rule of Charles VII.
- He participated in the League of the Public Weal under the rule of Louis XI, who, in reprisals, confiscated all his goods and had his main fortress at Chaumont destroyed.

== Marriage and issue ==
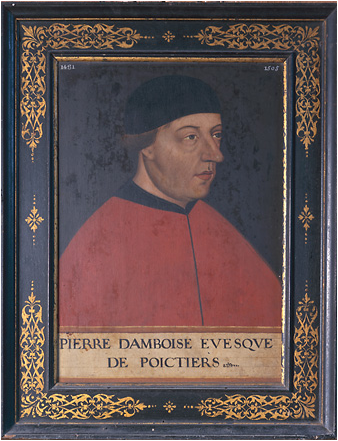
A 1501 portrait of Pierre d'Amboise's son, also named Pierre (?–1505), who was Bishop of Poitiers

On 23 August 1428 he married Anne de Bueil, Dame d'Aubijoux, daughter of Jean IV de Bueil and of Marguerite Dauphine d'Auvergne, countess of Sancerre.

They had 17 children, including:

- Charles I of Amboise, favourite of Louis XI
- Louis (1433–1503), bishop of Albi
- John VII of Amboise, bishop and Duke of Langres
- Jacques d'Amboise
- A son (1440–1498), seigneur de Bussy, married Catherine de Saint-Belin (issue)
- Georges d'Amboise (1460–1510), a cardinal and minister of state under Louis XII
- Hugues (?–1515), seigneur d'Aubijoux, married Madeleine de Lescun, dame de Sauveterre (issue)
- Pierre (?–1505), Bishop of Poitiers
- Emery (?–1512), Grand-Master of the Order of Malta, head of the armies of Francis I of France on the Milan campaigns
- Marie, married Jean de Hangest, seigneur de Genlis
- Anne, married Jacques de Chazeron
- Louise (?–1516), married Guillaume Gouffier de Boissy
- Madeleine d'Amboise (1461–1497), abbess of Charenton and of Saint Menoux
- Marguerite (?–1495). First married Jean Crespin, and then on 10 October 1457 Jean II de Rochechouart, baron de Mortemer
- Catherine, dame de Linières, who married Baron Pierre de Castelnau-Caylus

Pierre d'Amboise died in his castle of Meillant in Berry. On his death he was buried in the nunnery of Order of Poor Ladies he had founded at Bourges.
