= Jacques d'Amboise =

Jacques d'Amboise may refer to:

- Jacques d'Amboise (doctor) (1559–1606), French doctor and surgeon
- Jacques d'Amboise (bishop) (c. 1445 – 1516), French religious dignitary and patron of medieval France
- Jacques d'Amboise (dancer) (1934–2021), American ballet dancer and choreographer
