= D'Amboise =

D'Amboise is a French surname meaning "of Amboise". Notable people with the surname include the following:

- Charlotte d'Amboise, Broadway dancer and daughter of Jacques d'Amboise.
- Christopher d'Amboise, former New York City Ballet principal dancer and son of Jacques d'Amboise.
- François d'Amboise (1550–1619), French jurist and writer
- Jacques d'Amboise (doctor) (1559–1606), French doctor and surgeon
- Jacques d'Amboise (bishop) (c. 1445 – 1516), French religious dignitary and patron of medieval France
- Jacques d'Amboise (dancer) (1934–2021), American ballet dancer and choreographer
