= Catherine d'Amboise =

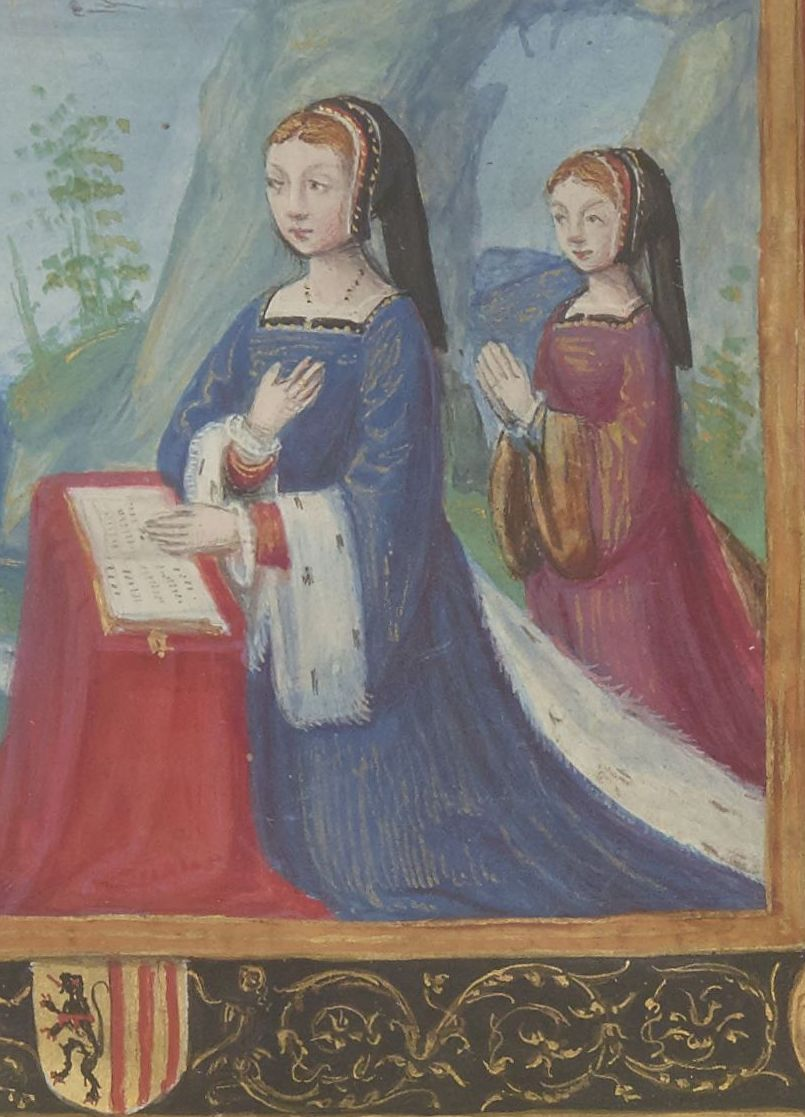
Catherine et Antoinette d' AMBOISE (sa nièce).jpg

Catherine d'Amboise (French: [katʁin dɑ̃bwaz]; 1475–1550) was a prose writer and poet of the French Renaissance. She wrote both verse and novels, including Book of the Prudent and Imprudent [Livre des Prudents et Imprudents] (1509) and Fainting Lady's Complaint against Fortune [La complainte de la dame pasemée contre Fortune] (1525), as well as royal song [chant royal], which is the only extant poem of its genre.

Catherine was one of a select group of aristocratic French female authors who have gained considerable attention in recent years. She was the subject of a thesis by Ariane Bergeron-Foote, Les oeuvres en prose de Catherine d'Amboise, dame de Lignières (1481-1550). The edition of Fainting Lady's has yet to be published.

== Family and life ==
Catherine d'Amboise was the daughter of Charles I d'Amboise and Catherine de Chauvigny, a powerful and wealthy French family. Her uncle was Georges d'Amboise, a French Roman Catholic Cardinal and minister of state. Catherine would act as a patron for her nephew, the poet Michel d'Amboise.

Catherine married Christophe de Tournon at a young age, but she became a widow at seventeen. In 1501, she married Philibert de Beaujeu, the Bishop of Bethlehem. Beaujeu died in 1541, and the following year she married for a third time, at the age of 65 years to Louis de Cleves.

Not much is factually known about Catherine's life, apart from the aspects that she chronicled in her writings. Through her writing, she spoke emotionally about the deaths of her parents and first husband, as well as the difficulties faced by female authors, including limited access to learning, inexperience in writing, and feminine modesty, with forbade touching upon topics deemed not womanly.

With her writings she also recorded her personal hardships in dealing with death. In Fainting Lady's Complaint against Fortune, she expressed how she lost both of her parents, her first husband and only child, her uncle Georges, who had died in 1510, and her brothers. Her eldest brother, Charles II d'Amboise, died in 1511. Her sister Marie died in 1519.

In Fainting Lady, her writing style is autobiographical – the protagonist's name is Catherine – and she laments the misfortune that has deprived her of her parents, her first husband and her only child, her uncle Georges, who died in 1510, and her brothers. She mourned, through the novel, the death of her brother Charles II; Catherine lamented that the deaths had taken the glory away from the house of Amboise, especially considering Charles II's only son died at the Battle of Pavia in 1525. Catherine states that she regularly uses writing as a type of therapy, often retiring to her study to compose “lamentations and feminine regrets.” In Fainting Lady's, she describes how, upon receiving news of her nephew death, she fainted and had to be resuscitated by a friend, Dame Raison.

After her nephew died, Catherine inherited his lands. They would pass to the house of La Rochefoucauld at her own death in 1550.

== Writings ==
Catherine d'Amboise never wanted to have her works published. She did not search for a wide circulation of her writing, whether in prose or verse. This differs from Michel d'Amboise, but is similar to her brother's sister-in-law, Anne de Graville. It is believed that her uncle Georges d'Amboise commissioned the works and published them himself.

While she did not want the acclaim, she "deserves to be read as an important contributor to the history of European literature and spirituality, not only because her work is at the crossroad of major intellectual currents, but also because she has ventured as a female author to measure up to famous early modern writers while offering comments on auctoritates [authorities] of the past." D'Amboise wrote both lyric verse and two prose works, Book of the Prudent and Imprudent [Livre des Prudents et Imprudents] (1509) and Fainting Lady's Complaint against Fortune [Complainte de la dame pasmee contre Fortune] (1525).

Her lyric verse evokes both profane and religious traditions, calls upon marial and nuptial mysticism, allegorical dialogue, and epistolary poetry. Her famous royal song [chant royal] in honor of the Virgin Mary is the only extant poem of the genre composed by a woman.

Catherine's prose works show a deep knowledge of biblical, mythological and historical sources, acquired most likely through compilations (although possibly through direct French translations). She mentions The Bible, Boethius' Consolation of Philosophy [Consolatio Philosophiae], Vincent de Beauvais' Mirror of history [Speculum historiale], Paulus Orosius' History, Paul the Deacon's Roman History, Aristotle, Lucan, Flavius Josephus, and Boccaccio, in addition to compilations of her time like La Mer des histoires, Les Histoires romaines, Les Grandes Chroniques de France, and L'Histoire ancienne jusqu'à César. She also mentions several of Cicero's and Virgil's masterpieces. Moreover, her Fainting Lady's Complaint against Fortune suggests that her sources probably included allegorical pilgrimages, like those written by Guillaume de Deguileville, Philippe de Mézières, and Gabrielle de Bourbon.

== Book of Prudent and Imprudent ==
Book of Prudent and Imprudent was Catherine's first work, or, as she referred to it, "le myen primier coup d'essay" [my first shot at it].

The novel is set in 1509 and is semi-autobiographical, with a protagonist called Katherine d'Amboise. She presents herself as downcast and on the verge of losing her mind until she seeks the help of Reason. She meets Reason in her private room, where she throws herself down on her bed, eyes open to the heavens, praying to God.

Catherine is then attacked by Corrupter Justice and Treason, and is also depicted as horrible creatures. She blames them for her misfortune and curses at the monsters until they leave.

Again in solitude, she begs the Lady of Mercy and her blessed Son to rescue her. Taking the form of a richly dressed celestial-being, Prudence arrives, announcing her prayers have been answered, and she will always be helped because of her dedication to Lady Patience.

Prudence points out the various trials and tribulations Katherine had to face since childhood and reminds her that all good servants must endure hardships. She then promises Katherine that she will lead her to a state of perfection. Katherine cannot speak for a few moments in a disbelieving state. Finally, she praises Prudence and demonstrates her allegiance by offering her heart, her understanding, and her first piece of writing – Book of Prudent and Imprudent.

=== Gender relations ===
The novel is part of the querelle des femmes tradition, a genre favored by late medieval and early renaissance humanists – especially for literary debate about the intelligence and capabilities of women. Catherine often interjects her opinions on the empowerment of women and the nature of power relations between the sexes.

In the novel, Catherine pleads to the reader, "Please make allowance and have consideration for the poor female sex." Her statement is both satiric and strategic; while men might take it seriously, women might laugh. Also, she then proceeds to explain that women are thought of as ignorant because society will not allow them to learn:

"And therefore I most humbly and insistently beseech the listeners of this volume that in their benevolent graciousness they would excuse me, and also my tender mind, which for lack of knowledge and understanding cannot write down terms of rhetoric. I would gladly do it if I could. Excuse therefore this poor apprentice's feeble mind; this will bring you honour. But it will bring you dishonour to contradict her. This is the work of a woman, and that gives peremptory reasons for making excuses, greater than for a man, who has the freedom to go here and there to universities and places of study where he may comprehend all sciences by solicitude, which is not the case of the female sex."

Also within the novel, Catherine proves herself to be a moralist. She never takes a neutral stance to a character, instead depicting viciously evil individuals and pure good ones. She also repeatedly becomes contentious with her gender; she does not hide behind her femininity. She states that gender cannot be suppressed, and she must write from a feminine perspective. Being a woman writing about women, she admits to occasional distortions of the truth.

== Fainting Lady's Complaint against Fortune ==
Fainting Lady's Complaint against Fortune [La complainte de la dame pasemée contre Fortune] is the second of Catherine d'Amboise's prose works. Written in 1525, it drew moral conclusions from historical and Biblical events, including that of Adam and Eve. The novel, like her other, is partly autobiographical; Catherine lamented the many misfortunes and deaths she had to endure in her life. She mourned the fall of the house of Amboise – when Charles II and his son died, leaving her the inheritance, it also represented the beginning of the downfall of the clan. Charles II had been one of the leaders of the French armies in Italy, and his son, who had played a leading role in political and cultural life in France, had also been deceased. She wrestles with these strong emotions as the book progresses.

The plot unfolds similarly to Book of Prudent and Imprudent. Reason is her chief mentor, possibly inspired by Boethius' De consolatione philosophiae, which was widely available in French and chose Reason over Philosophy.

Reason, as well as a host of allegorical figures, show Catherine and her friend, Dame Raison, about the benefits of suffering in this world. They encounter such figures as Evil Sadness and Despair to see the depth of their suffering. Reason leads the two women through the gateway of Self Knowledge, which is guarded by the gatekeeper Knowledge to God. From there, they journey to the Park of Divine Love where Patience consoles them. Patience tells the women that although their suffering cannot approach the suffering of Jesus on the cross, they too will be rewarded in the afterlife for their struggles.
