= Charles d'Amboise =

Charles d'Amboise may refer to:

- Charles I d'Amboise (1430–1481), French politician and military figure
- Charles II d'Amboise (1473–1511), French nobleman, son of above
