= Jean de Bueil =

Jean de Bueil may refer to:

- Jean IV de Bueil (died 1415), lord of Bueil-en-Touraine
- Jean V de Bueil (1406–1477), count of Sancerre, captain general, and admiral of France
