= Jacques d'Amboise (bishop) =

French religious dignitary

Arms of the Amboise family

Jacques d'Amboise (between 1440 and 1450 – 27 December 1516) was a French religious dignitary and patron of medieval France. He was abbot of Jumièges then of Cluny, and bishop of Clermont. He was a member of the House of Amboise, an old noble family.

== Life ==
He was the son of Anne de Bueil and Pierre d'Amboise, lord of Chaumont, as their seventh of eighteen children. Entering the Benedictine order he was elected abbot of Jumièges in January 1474, replacing his brother Louis on his appointment as bishop of Albi. Jacques took his oath of loyalty as abbot on 20 February 1474 and took possession of the abbey on 28 May.

In 1485 he succeeded a Bourbon as abbot of Cluny, rebuilding the Cluny abbots' hôtel in Paris as well as its now-lost chapel and collège. Located beside the Gallo-Roman ruins, the hôtel de Cluny hosted several royal visits and would be inhabited by cardinal Mazarin in 1634. He also built the abbatial palace of Paray-le-Monial.

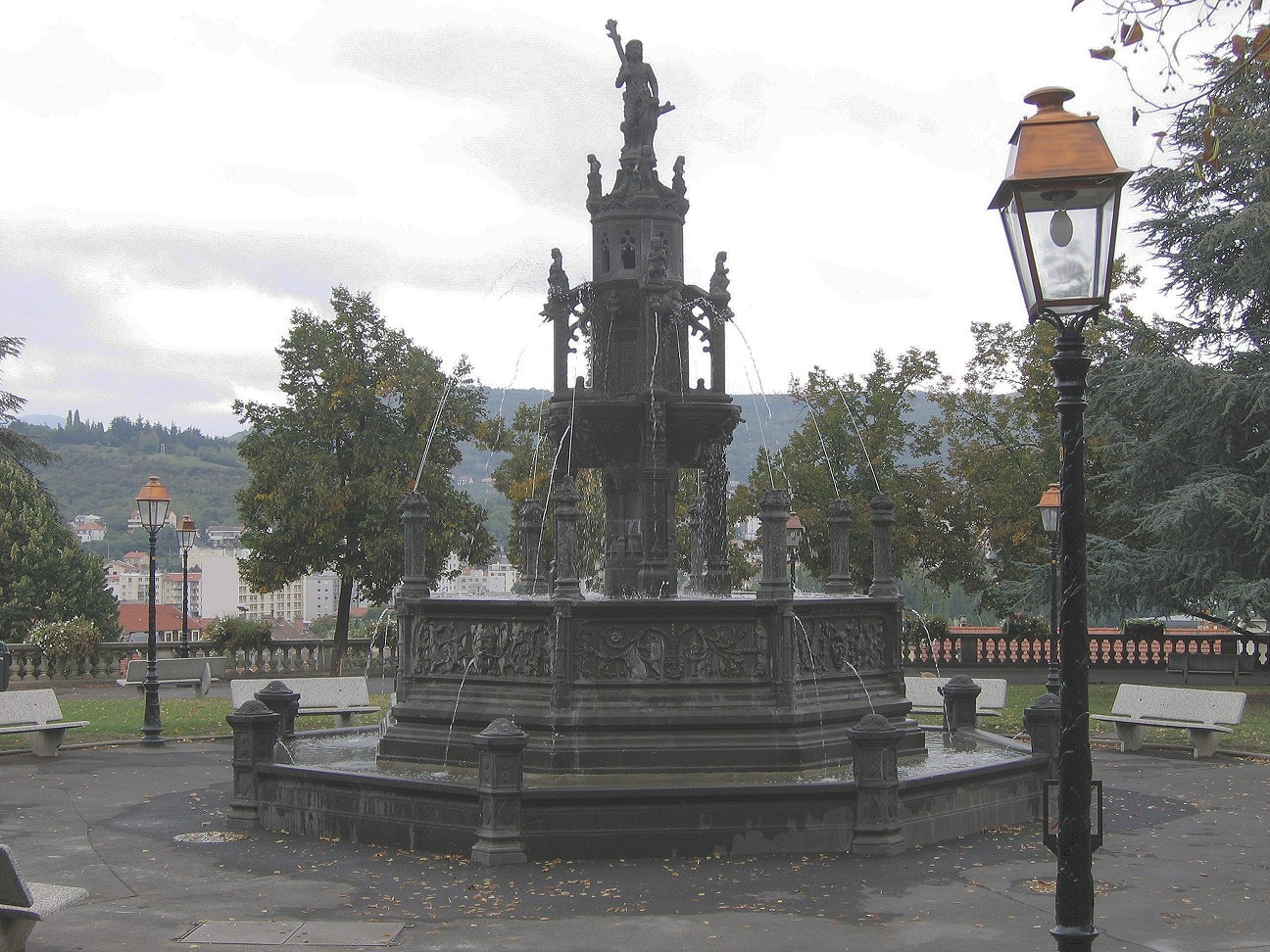
The fontaine d'Amboise at Clermont-Ferrand

The bishopric of Clermont had been left vacant at the end of 1504, and Louis XII appointed Jacques d'Amboise to it – he held the post from 1505 until his death. He completed the diocese's cathedral and replaced its tiles with a lead roof, as well as richly adding to its library and creating a tapestry in the choir of which four pieces are now in St Petersburg. In 1515 he built the fountain that bears his arms and name in Clermont.

Like his brothers Louis and Georges, he had a great sense of family : he appointed several of his nephews to church posts, adorned all his works with his family arms in or palé de gules and even inserted prayers for his family name in the eucharistic prayer, when this was actually only allowed to sites of the apostolic college.
