= Charles I d'Amboise =

French politician

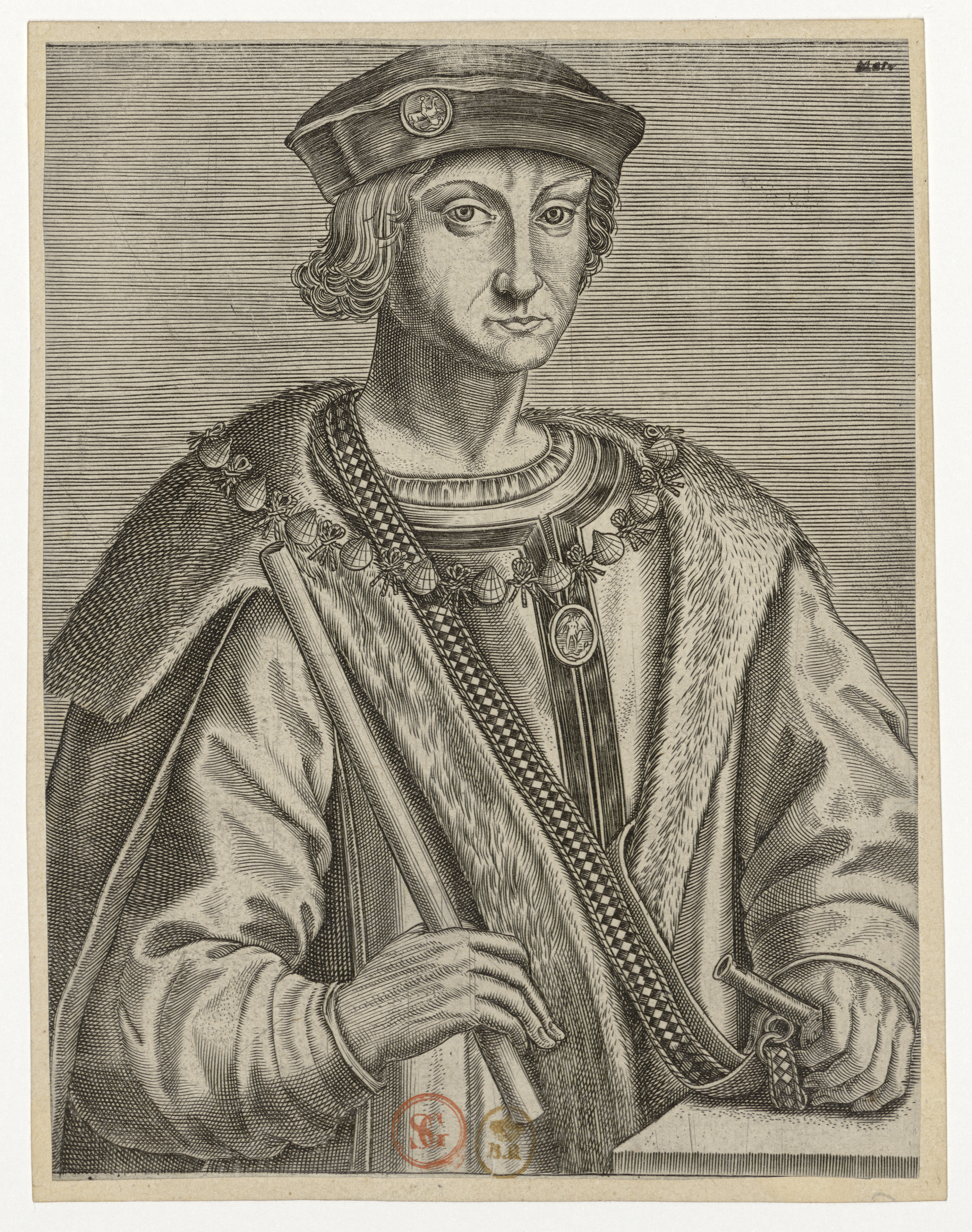
- Born: 1430
- Died: 22 February 1481 (aged 50–51)
- Occupations: politician, military figure
- Office: Governor of Île-de-France, Champagne and Burgundy
- Spouse: Catherine de Chauvigny (m. 1447)
- Children: François; Charles II d'Amboise (1473–1511); Louis II d'Amboise; Guy; Marie (married to Robert II of Saarbrücken-Commercy); Catherine d'Amboise (1482–1549)

Charles I d'Amboise (1430 – 22 February 1481) was a French politician and military figure, a member of the House of Amboise. He was lord of Chaumont-sur-Loire, Sagonne, Meillant, Charenton-du-Cher. Louis XI appointed him governor of Île-de-France, Champagne and Burgundy. He was admitted to the Order of Saint Michael.

== Family ==
He was the oldest son of Pierre d'Amboise. He had six children with his wife Catherine de Chauvigny (1447–1485).

- François
- Charles II d'Amboise (1473–1511)
- Louis II d'Amboise
- Guy
- Marie, married to Robert II of Saarbrücken-Commercy(† 1504), who was Count of Roucy, and had issue.
- Catherine d'Amboise (1482–1549)
