= Georges II d'Amboise =

Catholic bishop

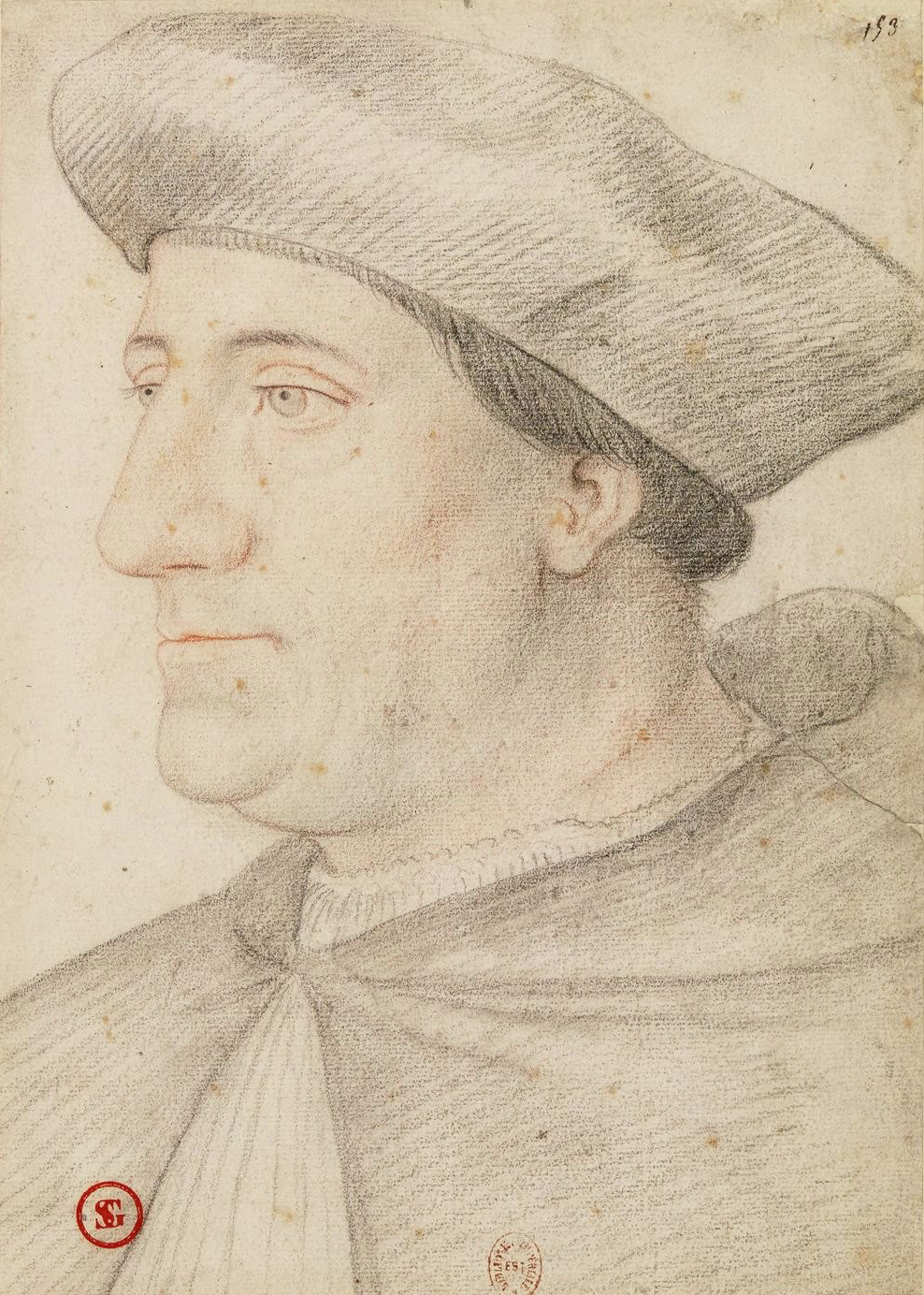
Contemporary portrait

Georges II d'Amboise (1488–1550) was a French Roman Catholic bishop and cardinal.

A member of the House of Amboise, Georges d'Amboise was born in the Kingdom of France in 1488, one of the sixteen children of Jean d'Amboise, signeur of Bussy, and Catherine de Saint-Belin. He was the nephew of Cardinal Georges d'Amboise. Following Georges' mother's death, Jean d'Amboise became Bishop of Maillezais and Bishop of Langres.

He was educated by preceptors Philippe Decium and Jean de Silva. Early in his ecclesiastical career, he became canon and archdeacon of the cathedral chapter of Rouen Cathedral; he later served as the chapter's treasurer and archdeacon.

On 8 August 1511 he was elected Archbishop of Rouen. He was consecrated as a bishop in December 1513, and he received the pallium on 9 March 1514. He served as the king's almoner, and later prime minister under Louis XII of France.

Pope Paul III made him a cardinal priest in the consistory of 16 December 1545. He was too ill to travel to Rome to receive the red hat, so it was sent to him on 15 March 1546; he received the titular church of Santa Susanna on 7 September 1546.

He participated in the papal conclave of 1549–50 that elected Pope Julius III. On 28 February 1550 he opted for the titular church of Santi Marcellino e Pietro al Laterano. Before his death, he briefly served as governor of Neustria.

He died at the Château de Vigny, near Paris, on 25 August 1550. He was buried in Rouen Cathedral.
