= 1549–1550 conclave =

Election of Catholic Pope Julius III

Papal conclave 1549–50

Dates and location
- 29 November 1549 – 7 February 1550; Cappella Paolina, Apostolic Palace, Papal States

Key officials
- Dean: Giovanni Domenico de Cupis
- Sub-dean: Giovanni Salviati
- Camerlengo: Alessandro Farnese

Election
- Ballots: 61

Elected pope
- Giovanni Ciocchi; Name taken: Julius III
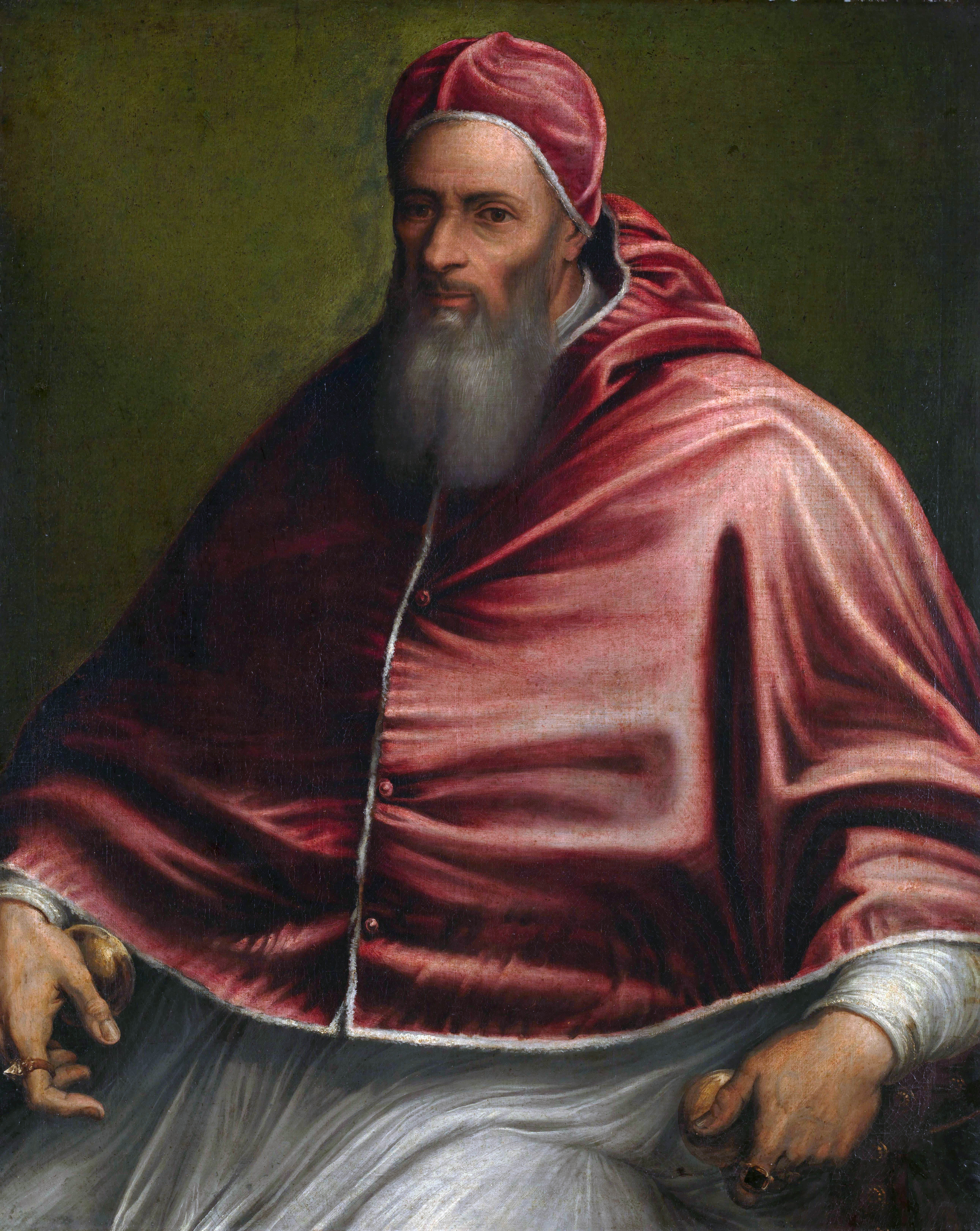

The 1549–50 papal conclave (29 November – 7 February) convened after the death of Pope Paul III and eventually elected Cardinal Giovanni Ciocchi as Pope Julius III. It was the second-longest papal conclave of the 16th century, and, at the time, the largest papal conclave in history in terms of the number of cardinal electors. The cardinal electors (who at one point totaled 51) were roughly divided between the factions of Henry II of France, Charles V, Holy Roman Emperor, and Alessandro Farnese, the cardinal-nephew of Paul III.

Noted for the extensive interference of European powers, the conclave was to determine whether and on what terms the Council of Trent would reconvene (supported by Charles V and opposed by Henry II) and the fate of the Duchies of Parma and Piacenza (claimed by both Charles V and the House of Farnese). Although the conclave nearly elected Reginald Pole, the late arrival of additional French cardinals pushed the conclave back into deadlock, and eventually Giovanni del Monte was elected Pope Julius III as a compromise candidate.

The French hoped that Julius III would be hostile to the interests of the Holy Roman Empire. Nevertheless, tensions between him and the French boiled over when he reconvened the Council of Trent in November 1550, culminating in the threat of schism in August 1551 and the brief War of Parma fought between French troops allied with Ottavio Farnese and a papal-imperial army. French prelates did not attend the 1551–1552 sessions of the Council of Trent and were slow to accept its reforms; because Henry II would not allow any French cardinals to reside in Rome, many missed the election of Pope Marcellus II, arriving in Rome just in time to elect Marcellus II's successor, Pope Paul IV, after Marcellus II's brief reign.

== Cardinal-electors ==
Pope Paul III had enlarged the College of Cardinals to an unprecedented 54, and the length of the conclave allowed many of the foreign cardinals to arrive, bringing the number of cardinal electors at one point to 51, although two died and several fell ill during the conclave, reducing their number to 44 by the final scrutiny (ballot).

According to the tally of Cardinal Charles de Lorraine-Guise in his letter to Henry II, once the twelve participating French cardinals reached Rome, 23 cardinals were aligned in the French faction, 22 in the Imperial faction, and four neutral; thus Guise judged it impossible for either faction to garner the necessary two-thirds simply by persuading neutral cardinals. In addition, eleven Italian cardinals that Guise counted among the French faction were only likely to vote for a fellow Italian, making the three favorites of Henry II—Louis de Bourbon de Vendôme, Jean de Lorraine, and Georges d'Amboise infeasible. The non-French cardinal protector of France, Ippolito II d'Este, would then have been the choice of Henry II; Catherine de' Medici preferred her cousin Giovanni Salviati, who was unacceptable to Charles V and the Farnese.

In contrast, Charles V favored Juan Álvarez de Toledo followed by Reginald Pole, and found unacceptable all of the French cardinals as well as Salviati, Nicolò Ridolfi, and the two prelates responsible for the transfer of the Council of Trent to Bologna (Giovanni Maria Ciocchi del Monte and Marcello Cervini degli Spannochi). A second imperial faction, led by Ercole Gonzaga and Diego Hurtado de Mendoza, that opposed Charles's preferred candidates, supported the candidacy of Gonzaga and Salviati.

Elector	Nationality	Order	Title	Elevated	Elevator	Notes
Giovanni Domenico de Cupis	Roman (pro-French)	Cardinal-bishop	Bishop of Ostia e Velletri	1517, July 1	Leo X	Dean of the College of Cardinals
Giovanni Salviati	Florentine (pro-French)	Cardinal-bishop	Bishop of Porto e Santa Rufina	1517, July 1	Leo X	Sub-Dean of the College of Cardinals; Uncle of Catherine de' Medici
Philippe de la Chambre	French	Cardinal-bishop	O.S.B., bishop of Frascati	1533, November 7	Clement VII	
Gian Pietro Carafa	Neapolitan (pro-French)	Cardinal-bishop	Bishop of Sabina, archbishop of Naples	1536, December 22	Paul III	Future Pope Paul IV
Giovanni Maria Ciocchi del Monte	Roman	Cardinal-bishop	Bishop of Palestrina	1536, December 22	Paul III	Elected Pope Julius III
Ennio Filonardi	Roman (pro-French)	Cardinal-bishop	Bishop of Albano	1536, December 22	Paul III	Died December 19, 1549
Innocenzo Cibo	Florentine	Cardinal-deacon	Administrator of Marseille, France	1517, July 1	Leo X	Primus diaconus, Cardinal-nephew; Withdrew January 23 with tertian fever
Louis de Bourbon de Vendôme	French	Cardinal-bishop	Bishop of Laon, administrator of Sens, France	1517, July 1	Leo X	
Nicolò Ridolfi	Florentine (pro-French)	Cardinal-bishop	Bishop of Vicenza	1517, July 1	Leo X	Died January 31/February 1, 1550, Cardinal-nephew
Francesco Pisani	Venetian,	Cardinal-bishop	Bishop of Padua	1517, July 1	Leo X	
Jean de Lorraine	French	Cardinal-bishop	Bishop of Metz, Lorraine, administrator of Narbonne, Agen, and Nantes, France	1518, May 28	Leo X	
Niccolò Gaddi	Florentine			1527, May 3	Clement VII	
Ercole Gonzaga	Mantuan (pro-Imperial)	Cardinal-bishop	Bishop of Mantua	1527, May 3	Clement VII	
Girolamo Doria	Genoese		Administrator of Tarragona	1529, January	Clement VII	
François de Tournon	French	Cardinal-bishop	Archbishop of Auch, France	1530, March 9	Clement VII	
Odet de Coligny de Châtillon	French		Administrator of Beauvais, and Toulouse, France.	1533, November 7	Clement VII	
Alessandro Farnese	Valentano	Cardinal-bishop	Administrator of Avignon and Tours, France; Viseu, Portugal; and Monreale, Sicily	1534, December 18	Paul III	Camerlengo, Cardinal-nephew
Guido Ascanio Sforza	Roman	Cardinal-bishop	Bishop of Parma	1534, December 18	Paul III	
Jean du Bellay	French	Cardinal-bishop	Bishop of Paris, administrator of Bordeaux, France	1535, May 21	Paul III	
Rodolfo Pio di Carpi	Carpi (pro-Imperial)			1536, December 22	Paul III	
Reginald Pole	English (pro-Imperial)	Cardinal-bishop	Papal legate (Note: Pole was in exile from his native England due to the Protestant policy of then-King Edward VI; Pole would not be installed as Archbishop of Canterbury until after the accession of Mary I in 1553)	1536, December 22	Paul III	
Niccolò Caetani	Neapolitan			1536, December 22 published March 13, 1538	Paul III	
Juan Álvarez de Toledo	Spanish (pro-Imperial)	Cardinal-bishop	O.P., bishop of Burgos, Spain	1538, December 20	Paul III	Brother of Pedro de Toledo, viceroy of Charles V to Naples
Robert de Lenoncourt	French	Cardinal-bishop	Bishop of Châlons sur Marne, France	1538, December 20	Paul III	
Ippolito II d'Este	Ferrara (pro-French)	Cardinal-bishop	Archbishop of Milan; administrator of Lyon, France; administrator of Autun, France	1538, December 20 published March 5, 1539	Paul III	Member of the court of Francis I of France
Antoine Sanguin de Meudon	French	Cardinal-bishop	Bishop of Orléans, France	1539, December 19	Paul III	
Marcello Cervini degli Spannochi		Cardinal-bishop	Bishop of Gubbio	1539, December 19	Paul III	Future Pope Marcellus II
Giacomo Savelli	Roman			1539, December 19	Paul III	
Miguel da Silva	Portuguese	Cardinal-bishop	Bishop of Massa Marittima	1539, December 19 published December 2, 1541	Paul III	
Giovanni Morone	Milanese (pro-Imperial)			1542, June 2	Paul III	
Marcello Crescenzi	Roman		Administrator of Conza	1542, June 2	Paul III	
Cristoforo Madruzzo	Imperial	Cardinal-bishop	Bishop of Trent, Tyrol, bishop of Brixen, Austria	1542, June 2 published January 7, 1545	Paul III	
Francisco Mendoza de Bobadilla	Spanish (pro-Imperial)	Cardinal-bishop	Bishop of Coria, Spain	1544, December 19	Paul III	
Bartolomé de la Cueva y Toledo	Spanish (pro-Imperial)			1544, December 19	Paul III	
Georges d'Armagnac	French	Cardinal-bishop	Bishop of Rodez, administrator of Tours, France	1544, December 19	Paul III	
Otto Truchess von Waldburg	Imperial	Cardinal-bishop	Bishop of Augsburg, Germany	1544, December 19	Paul III	
Andrea Cornaro	Venetian	Cardinal-bishop	Bishop of Brescia	1544, December 19	Paul III	
Francesco Sfondrati	Milanese (pro-Imperial)	Cardinal-bishop	Bishop of Cremona	1544, December 19	Paul III	
Federico Cesi	Roman			1544, December 19	Paul III	
Durante de Duranti		Cardinal-bishop	Bishop of Cassano	1544, December 19	Paul III	
Girolamo Recanati Capodiferro	Roman		Saint-Jean de Maurienne, Savoy	1544, December 19	Paul III	
Tiberio Crispo	Roman		Administrator of Amalfi	1544, December 19	Paul III	Cardinal-nephew
Pedro Pacheco de Villena	Spanish (pro-Imperial)	Cardinal-bishop	Bishop of Jaén, Spain	1545, December 16	Paul III	
Georges d'Amboise	French	Cardinal-bishop	Archbishop of Rouen, France	1545, December 16	Paul III	
Ranuccio Farnese		Cardinal-bishop	Grand penitentiary, archbishop of Ravenna	1545, December 16	Paul III	Cardinal-nephew
Charles de Lorraine-Guise	French	Cardinal-bishop	Archbishop of Reims, France	1547, July 27	Paul III	
Giulio Feltre della Rovere			Administrator of Urbino	1547, July 27 published January 9, 1548	Paul III	
Charles II de Bourbon-Vendôme	French	Cardinal-bishop	Bishop of Saintes, France	1548, January 9	Paul III	
Girolamo Verallo	Roman	Cardinal-bishop	Archbishop of Rossano, bishop of Capaccio	1549, April 8	Paul III	
Giovanni Angelo Medici	Milanese	Cardinal-bishop	Archbishop of Ragusa, Dalmatia	1549, April 8	Paul III	Future Pope Pius IV
Bernardino Maffei	Roman	Cardinal-bishop	Archbishop of Chieti	1549, April 8	Paul III	

Absent were three cardinals, the Frenchmen Claude de Longwy de Givry, Bishop of Poitiers, and Jacques d'Annebaut, Bishop of Lisieux, and Henrique de Portugal, Archbishop of Evora.

== Procedure ==
The rules of the conclave, as laid out in Ubi periculum and codified into canon law were nominally observed, but also blatantly disregarded, especially with respect to the rules prohibiting communication with the outside world. Some unauthorized persons are known to have been present in the conclave, leaving through the small door left open (per portulam ostio conclavis relictam). Portuguese Cardinal Miguel de Silva, irked by the presence of ambassadors from both Charles V and Henry II, complained to Dean de Cupis that the conclave was "more open than closed" (non conclusum sed patens conclave). By January 14, with the arrival of Louis de Bourbon, there were approximately 400 people in the conclave, only 48 of whom were cardinals—including the brothers of some cardinals, the representatives of secular rulers, and those whose only purpose was to inform the outside world on the proceedings.

On November 27, the twelve cardinals who had arrived in Rome by then, joined the twenty-nine who had been in Rome at the death of Paul III in drawing lots of the assignment of cells during the conclave; however, those who were already ill were given preferential cell placement without having to draw lots. The conclavists decided to proceed with "closed" ballots (ut vota secreto darentur) on December 3, having read and sworn to adhere to the bull of Pope Julius II against simoniacal election, Contra simoniacos, and Pope Gregory X's bull establishing the conclave, Ubi periculum on December 1. On January 31, a reform committee—composed of Carafa, Bourbon, Pacheco, Waldburg, de Silva, and Pole—decided on thirteen new rules: limiting each cardinal to three conclavists, preventing cardinals from enlarging or switching assigned cells, prohibiting private meetings of more than three cardinals, banning eating together or sharing food, and confining the cardinals to their cells between 10:30 p.m. and dawn; physicians and barbers were each limited to three Italians, and one each of France, Germany, and Spain.

== Balloting ==
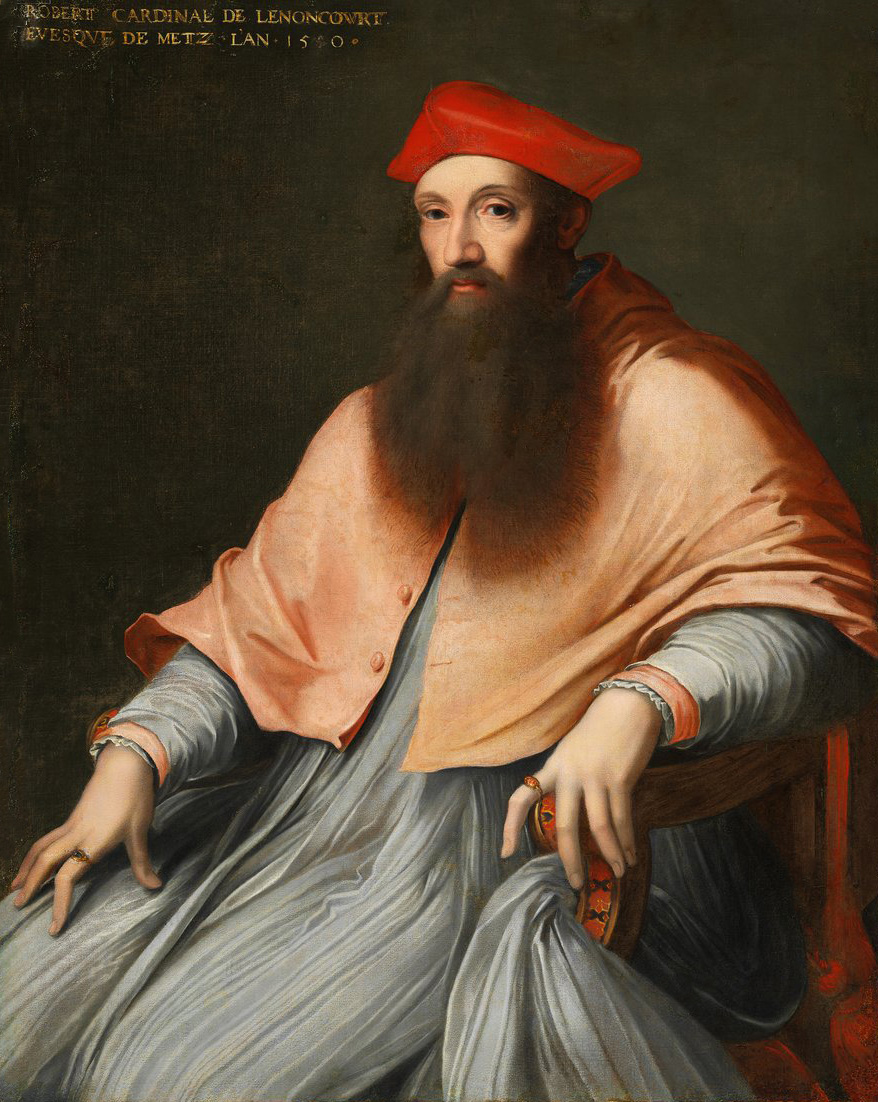
Reginald Pole, the second choice of Charles V and early favorite of the conclave

The first scrutiny was held on December 3, the fifth day of the conclave, in the Cappella Paolina (not the Sistine Chapel, which had been divided into nineteen cells for infirm cardinals). Because it took ten days for the news of Pope Paul III's death to reach the French court, at the start of the conclave almost all the cardinals aligned with the Holy Roman Empire were in Rome, while only two of the fourteen French cardinals were in Italy (one was Antoine du Meudon, who had been vacationing in Farnese territory); because one clause of the Concordat of Bologna allowed the pope to fill French benefices if the French prelate died in Rome, Henry II exhorted his cardinals to remain in France, and relied on his non-French allies (in particular, Ippolito II d'Este) to act as his go-between with the Roman Curia. d'Este had done his best to delay the start of the conclave to allow the French cardinals to arrive, using his influence to schedule the papal funerary rite (which was, by law, nine days long) to begin an unusual nine days after Paul III's death.

At the start of the conclave, Alessandro Farnese, the cardinal-nephew of Paul III, and his faction of four or five cardinals (including Ranuccio Farnese and Guido Ascanio Sforza), whom Guise had counted among the French faction, began supporting the second choice of the Holy Roman Emperor, Reginald Pole, apparently having received assurances that Ottavio Farnese's claim to the Duchy of Parma would be supported by Charles V. On December 5, Pole received twenty-six votes, only two short of the requisite two-thirds majority, prompting French ambassador Claude d'Urfé to rush to the door of the conclave, demanding that the conclave wait for the French cardinals, whom he claimed were in Corsica, and threatening that the election of a pope in their absence would be likely to cause a schism.

Whether or not Urfé's warning had any effect on the conclavists, from December 7, when the French cardinals landed south of Genoa, to the end of the conclave, Pole polled no more twenty-four or twenty-three votes. On December 11, four French cardinals—Guise, Charles de Bourbon, Odet de Coligny de Châtillon, and Jean du Bellay—arrived, bringing the requisite supermajority to thirty-one. Henry II bankrolled Guise with a sum of 150,000 écus, likely for bribes, and additional French cardinals began to trickle into the conclave: Georges d'Amboise and Philippe de la Chambre on December 28; Jean de Lorraine on December 31; and (the extremely elderly) Louis de Bourbon on January 14.

By the end of January, Pole had dropped to twenty-one votes, but the French faction remained split between Carafa, de Bourbon, Lorraine, and Salviati; Este's candidacy, though desired by many in the French College, had not yet been put forward, perhaps having been held back in hopes that he would be more acceptable as the conclave dragged on. Toward the end of January, in accordance with traditional efforts to counter dilatory cardinals, the amenities and rations of the conclave were decreased and the upper story windows were closed to reduce the natural lighting and fresh air. Soon afterwards, Ridolfi—the French candidate most acceptable to Farnese—died amid accusations of poisoning on January 31.

A letter dated February 6 from Henry II, advising Guise to support a neutral candidate, never reached the conclave before its conclusion. Although Del Monte had originally been opposed by both the Imperial faction (for his role in moving the Council of Trent) and the French faction (for his plebeian genealogy and alleged personal indiscretions), he obtained the support of the French for his perceived past hostility to the Empire, the support of Farnese for his pledge to support the claim of Ottavio Farnese in Parma, and the support of a few Imperialists, having not been specifically excluded in Charles V's last letter. On February 7, on the sixty-first scrutiny of the conclave, Del Monte was "unanimously" elected and took the name Pope Julius III (forty-one cardinals had previously acquiesced to his candidacy, although the more fervent of the Imperialists had not until it was already inevitable).

== Primary sources ==
The main sources for the proceedings and vote-counts of the conclave come from the accounts Enrico Dandolo of Venice, Simon Renard (the Imperial ambassador to France), and Diego de Mendoza (ambassador to Charles V), the correspondences between Henry II and Guise and d'Este, and the diaries of the various conclavists. In particular, Angelo Massarelli, the secretary of Marcello Cervini, devotes his entire fifth diary to the conclave.

=== The papabili ===
Before and during the conclave, many Roman bankers offered betting spreads on the papabili (cardinals likely to be elected). According to Dandolo, "it is more than clear that the merchants are very well informed about the state of the poll, and that the cardinals' attendants in Conclave go partners with them in wagers, which thus causes many tens of thousands of crowns to change hands" (an early example of insider trading).

Cardinal del Monte (who was eventually elected Julius III) had started out as the favorite at 1 to 5, trailed by Salviati, Ridolfi, and Pole, but Pole was the favorite three days later at 1 to 4. By December 5, Pole's odds had risen to 95 to 100. With the arrival of four additional French cardinals on December 11, Pole's odds fell to 2 to 5. On January 22, the odds quoted against the conclave finishing during January were 9 to 10, against February: 1 to 2, against March: 1 to 5, and never: 1 to 10.
