= Georges d'Amboise =

French cardinal (1460–1510)

His Eminence Georges d'Amboise
- Archbishop of Rouen
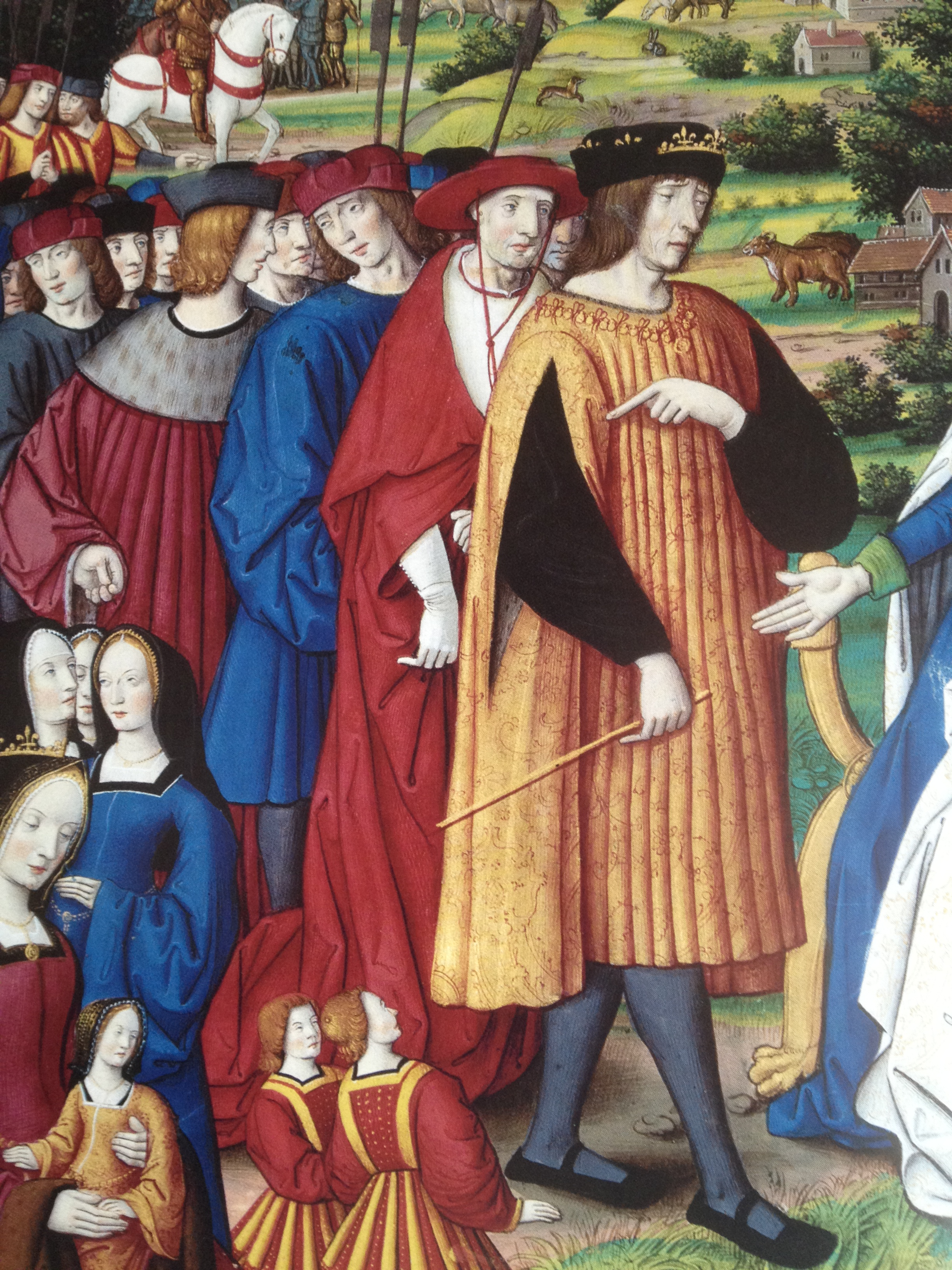
- Contemporary illustration of Cardinal d’Amboise walking behind Louis XII, from a copy of Remèdes de l'une et l'autre, a French translation of Petrarch, 1503
- Church: Catholic Church
- Archdiocese: Rouen
- Appointed: 1493
- Term ended: 1510
- Predecessor: Robert IV de Croixmare
- Successor: Georges II d'Amboise
- Other posts: Cardinal-Priest of San Sisto Vecchio (1498-1510)
- Previous posts: Archbishop of Narbonne (1482-1484); Bishop of Montauban (1484-1491)

Orders
- Consecration: 1489
- Created cardinal: 17 September 1498 by Pope Alexander VI
- Rank: Cardinal-Priest

Personal details
- Born: 1460 Château de Chaumont, Chaumont-sur-Loire
- Died: 25 May 1510 (aged 49–50) Lyon, France
- Buried: Rouen Cathedral
- Coat of arms: Georges d'Amboise's coat of arms

Georges d'Amboise (1460 – May 25, 1510) was a French Catholic cardinal and minister of state. He belonged to the House of Amboise, a noble family possessed of considerable influence: of his nine brothers, four were bishops. His father, Pierre d'Amboise, seigneur de Chaumont, was chamberlain to Charles VII and Louis XI and ambassador at Rome. Georges' eldest brother, Charles, was governor of the Île-de-France, Champagne and Burgundy, and councillor of Louis XI.

== Biography ==
=== Early years ===
Georges d'Amboise was born at Château de Chaumont, son of Pierre d'Amboise and Anne du Beueil. He was only fourteen when his father procured for him the bishopric of Montauban, and Louis XI appointed him one of his almoners. On arriving at manhood d'Amboise attached himself to the party of Louis, duc d'Orléans, in whose cause he suffered imprisonment at Corbeil, and on whose return to the royal favor he was elevated to the archbishopric of Narbonne, (June 18, 1482) in which the pope refused to confirm him; after some time he changed his see for that of Rouen (1493). On the appointment of Orléans as governor of Normandy, d'Amboise became his lieutenant-general.

In 1498 the duc d'Orléans mounted the throne as Louis XII, and d'Amboise was suddenly raised to the high position of cardinal (September 17, 1498) and prime minister. In December 1498, he obtained the annulment of the marriage of King Louis to Jeanne de Valois (who was incapable of bearing children); King Louis then married Anne de Bretagne, widow of his predecessor King Charles VIII, in January 1499.

=== Italian Wars ===
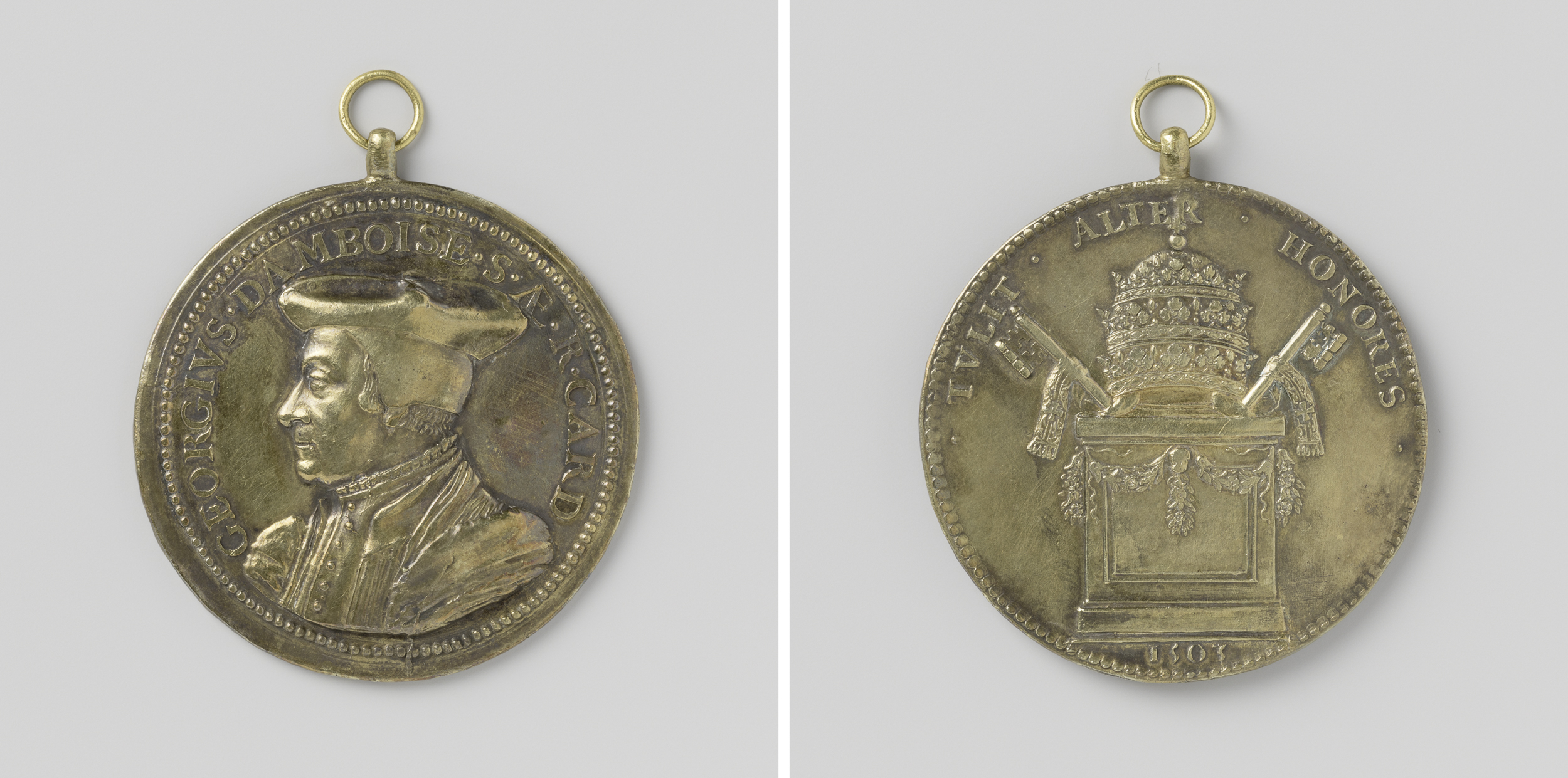
Medallion commemorating Georges d'Amboise, designed by Pierre Regnier and struck between 1634 and 1640

His foreign policy was animated by the aim of increasing French power in Italy by the conquest of the Milanese territories, in which he can be seen as the continuator of the policies of Étienne de Vesc. On 9 February 1499, he signed a treaty with Venice to which Pope Alexander VI adhered. He accompanied Louis and entered with him into Milan 6 October 1499; he was charged with organizing that province under French control, then returned to France in November. After the revolt of March 1500 in favor of Ludovico Sforza, the cardinal was appointed lieutenant general; he retook the duchy of Milan and sent Sforza to France as a prisoner. He made a triumphal entrance into Lyon on 23 June and received from Louis XII the countship of Lomello. The Cardinal returned to Italy at the beginning of 1501 for the attempted conquest of Naples; he went to Trent as ambassador in October 1501.

His administration in France was, in many respects, well-intentioned and useful. He was able to diminish the imposts, introduce order among the soldiery, and above all, by the ordinances of 1499, improve the organization of justice. He wanted reform of the church, particularly for the reform of the monasteries; and it is greatly to his credit that he did not avail himself of the favorable opportunities he possessed of becoming a pluralist.

He regularly spent a large income in charity, and he labored strenuously to stay the progress of the plague and famine which broke out in 1504.

=== Construction of the Butter Tower ===
The Butter Tower of Rouen Cathedral was erected in the early 16th century. d'Amboise had authorised the burning of butter instead of oil, which was scarce, in lamps during Lent, collecting monies of six deniers Tournois from each diocesan for this permission. A bell for the tower was cast in 1501 and named for George d'Amboise. It cracked in 1786 and was melted down for cannon during the French Revolution.

=== Aspirations for the Papacy ===
On the death of Pope Alexander VI (1492–1503) he aspired to the papacy during the papal conclave, September 1503. He had French troops at the gates of Rome, by means of which he could easily have frightened the conclave and induced them to elect him; but he was persuaded to trust to his influence; the troops were dismissed, and an Italian was appointed as Pius III (1503); and again, on the death of Pius within the month, another Italian, Julius II (1503–13), was chosen.

On 4 December 1503 Cardinal d'Amboise received as compensation the title of papal legate for life in France and of Avignon.

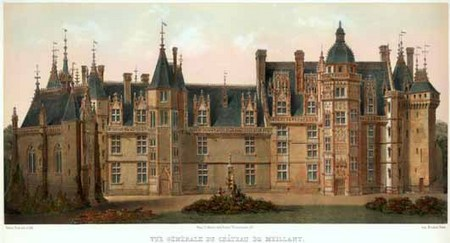
Château de Meillant, near Bourges (Cher).

=== League of Cambrai ===
He was one of the negotiators of the disastrous Treaty of Blois (1504), and in 1508 of the League of Cambrai against Venice. In 1509 he again accompanied Louis XII into Italy, but on his return he was seized at the city of Lyon with a fatal attack of gout in the stomach. He died there on 25 May 1510. His body was removed to Rouen; and a magnificent tomb, on which he is represented kneeling in the attitude of prayer, was erected to his memory in the cathedral of that town. Throughout his life he was an enlightened patron of letters and art, and it was at his orders that the Château de Gaillon near Rouen was built.

The town of Amboise owes much of its importance to the renown of Georges d'Amboise, whose forebears, however, forfeited the château whence they derived their name.

His nephews Louis d'Amboise, Georges II d'Amboise and François Guillaume de Castelnau de Clermont-Ludève were also made cardinals.

== Popular culture ==
His capacity as an administrator was such that he is believed to be the original "Georges" of the now-obsolete catchphrase "Laissez faire à Georges" (English: "Let George do it"). The idiom apparently first appears in French in the mid-17th century, but its relationship to the 20th-century American saying "Let George do it" is most likely coincidental.

== Sources ==
- Bellesrives, Léonce de (1853). Le Cardinal Georges d'Amboise: ministre de Louis XII (in French). Limoges: Barbou frères.
- Bottineau-Fuchs, Yves (2005). Georges 1er d'Amboise 1460-1510: Un prélat normand de la Renaissance (in French). Rouen: Editions PTC. ISBN 978-2-906258-90-7.
- Doucet, R. (1957). "France under Charles VIII and Louis XII". In G. R. Potter (ed.). The New Cambridge Modern History: I. The Renaissance 1493–1520. Cambridge: Cambridge University Press. pp. 293–4, 302–3, 307.
- Le Gendre, Louis (1724). Vie du Cardinal d'Amboise, premier ministre de Louis XII, avec un parallèle des cardinaux célèbres qui ont gouverné des Estats par Louis Le Gendre (in French). Rouen: Machuel.
- Saulnier, V.L. (1955). "L'Auteur du Forimont en Prose Imprimé: Girard Moët de Pommesson". Bibliothèque d'Humanisme et Renaissance (in French). 17 (2): 207–217.

Attribution:
