= Louis d'Amboise =

French bishop and cardinal

Louis d'Amboise (died 1511) was a French Roman Catholic bishop and cardinal.

A member of the House of Amboise, Louis d'Amboise was born in the Kingdom of France, ca. 1479. He was a cousin of Cardinals François Guillaume de Castelnau-Clermont-Ludève and Georges d'Amboise.

He became archdeacon of Narbonne at the age of 18.

On July 1, 1503, he was elected Bishop of Albi. He occupied this see until resigning on September 30, 1510.

Pope Julius II made him a cardinal priest in the consistory of December 18, 1506. He received the red hat and the titular church of Santi Marcellino e Pietro al Laterano on January 11, 1510.

He and his cousin Cardinal Castelnau de Clermont-Ludève were making a pilgrimage to the Basilica della Santa Casa, Loreto when Cardinal d'Amboise died in Loreto on March 3, 1511. He is buried in the basilica in Loreto, while his heart was buried in Albi Cathedral.
