= Charles II d'Amboise =

French nobleman

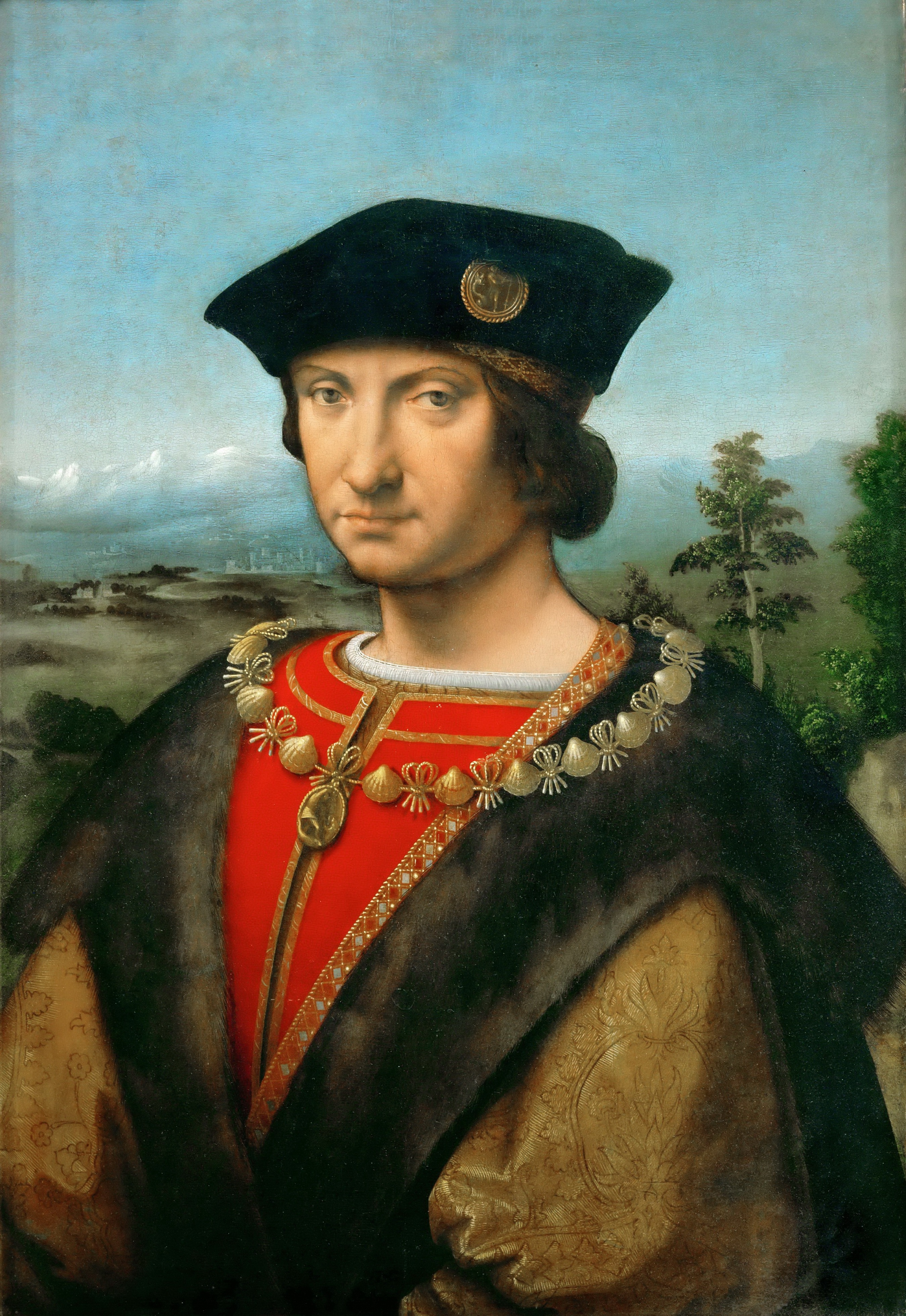
1507 portrait by Andrea Solari.

Charles II d'Amboise, Seigneur de Chaumont (1473 – 11 March 1511) was a French nobleman, who acted as French governor of Milan (1503–1511) during the reign of Louis XII and as a French commander during the War of the League of Cambrai.

== Biography ==
Charles was the son of Charles I d'Amboise, governor of Champagne and Bourgogne, and Catherine de Chauvigny. He was the nephew of Cardinal Georges d'Amboise, prime minister of King Louis XII of France. Charles acted as governor of Paris, of the Duchy of Milan, of the seignory of Genoa, and of the province of Normandie. In 1501 he was made French lieutenant general and then viceroy of Lombardy, becoming a friend of Leonardo da Vinci during his stay in Milan. Charles was Grand Master of France from 1502 to 1504, when he became Marshal of France. From 1508 to 1510 he was also admiral of France and in 1507 suppressed a revolt in Genoa.

At the battle of Agnadello, 1509, Charles commanded the French vanguard. In 1510, he took command of the French forces fighting against Pope Julius II in the Romagna, for which he was excommunicated. He failed to prevent Julius from capturing Bologna, and in 1511 also lost Mirandola. A month later he failed to recapture Modena. He died of an illness at Correggio, seven hours before news reached him of the lifting of his excommunication.

== See also ==
- Italian Wars

== Sources ==
- Berriot-Salvadore, Evelyne (2008). "Les manuscrits de Gabrielle de Bourbon et de Catherine d'Amboise: miroir d'un intineraire". In Poirier, Guy (ed.). Dix ans de recherche sur les femmes écrivains de l'ancien regime (in French). Les Presses de l'Universite Laval. pp. 89–112. ISBN 9782763704524.
- Meserve, Margaret (2021). Papal Bull: Print, Politics, and Propaganda in Renaissance Rome. Johns Hopkins University Press. ISBN 9781421440446.
- Tucker, Spencer C., ed. (2010). "Southern Europe: Italy: War of the League of Cambrai: Battle of Agnadello". A Global Chronology of Conflict: From the Ancient World to the Modern Middle East. Vol. II: 1500-1774. ABC-CLIO. ISBN 978-1-85109-667-1.
