= Meillant =

- Commune
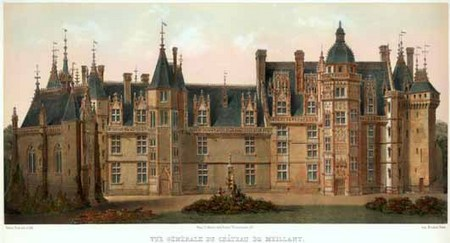
- Chateau

- Coat of arms
- Location of Meillant
- Location within France Location within Centre-Val de Loire
- Coordinates: 46°46′54″N 2°30′20″E
- Country: France
- Region: Centre-Val de Loire
- Department: Cher
- Arrondissement: Saint-Amand-Montrond
- Canton: Saint-Amand-Montrond
- Intercommunality: CC Cœur de France

Government
  - Mayor (2020–2026): Marie-Claude Julien
- Area^{1}: 40.6 km^{2} (15.7 sq mi)
- Elevation: 184 m (604 ft)
- Highest elevation: 288 m (945 ft)
- Lowest elevation: 152 m (499 ft)
- Population (2023): 645
  - Density: 15.9/km^{2} (41.1/sq mi)
- Time zone: UTC+01:00 (CET)
  - Summer (DST): UTC+02:00 (CEST)
- INSEE/Postal code: 18142 /18200
- ^{1} French Land Register data, which excludes lakes, ponds, glaciers > 1 km^{2} (0.386 sq mi or 247 acres) and river estuaries.

Meillant (French pronunciation: [mɛjɑ̃]) is a commune in the Cher department in the Centre-Val de Loire region of France.

== Geography ==
An area of lakes and streams, forestry and farming comprising the village and several hamlets, situated some 22 miles (35 km) south of Bourges, at the junction of the D10, D92 and the D37 roads.

== Population ==
Historical population
Year	Pop.	±% p.a.
1968	772	—
1975	658	−2.26%
1982	685	+0.58%
1990	749	+1.12%
1999	792	+0.62%
2007	784	−0.13%
2012	670	−3.09%
2017	686	+0.47%
2023	645	−1.02%
Source: INSEE

== Sights ==
- The church of St. Aubin, dating from the sixteenth century.
- The thirteenth-century château de Meillant, once the home of the house of Amboise.
- Several houses dating from the sixteenth century.
- A seventeenth-century washhouse at the hamlet of Saint-Rhamble.
- Traces of a 17th-century priory.
- The sixteenth-century chapel at the chateau.
- Some parts of the convent of Saint Catherine.
- A museum at the chateau.

== See also ==
- Communes of the Cher department
