= Jean V de Bueil =

French noble and military commander

Coat of Arms of Jean V de Bueil

Jean V de Bueil (born sometime between 17 August 1405 and 18 August 1406, died 1478), called le Fléau des Anglais "plague of the English", was count of Sancerre, viscount of Carentan, lord of Montrésor, Château-en-Anjou, Saint-Calais, Vaujours, Ussé and Vailly, son of Jean IV de Bueil and Marguerite Dauphine of Auvergne. He is the author of Le Jouvencel (c. 1466), a semi-autobiographical roman a clef based on his experiences during the latter part of the Hundred Years War.

== Career ==
Jean de Bueil began his military career as a page of the Count of Narbonne and was present at the Battle of Verneuil. Later he served under mercenary captain Étienne de Vignolles, known as La Hire. He was made captain of Tours in 1428, later captain general in Anjou and Maine. Together with Joan of Arc, he successfully completed the Siege of Orléans. In September 1432 he assaulted Les Ponts-de-Cé but failed to take it from the routiers of Rodrigo de Villandrando. He participated with the Dauphin Louis in a campaign against the Swiss in 1444 and was present at the battle of St. Jakob an der Birs. He was engaged in the reconquest of Normandy from the English and became admiral of France and captain of Cherbourg in 1450. In 1453, he was present at the Battle of Castillon. In 1461, the new king Louis XI replaced de Bueil as Admiral with Jean de Montaubin, which began a rift which would lead to de Bueil joining the rebels during the War of the Public Weal in 1465. De Bueil was later reconciled to the king and was admitted to the Order of St. Michael in 1469. His last known act was to sign, on 31 May 1478 at his château de Vaujours, the document by which he confirmed certain rights of the prior of Charnes, a priory located in the county of Sancerre.

== Le Jouvencel ==
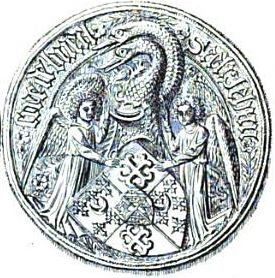
Seal of Jean V de Bueil

Jean de Bueil wrote Le Jouvencel about 1466. De Bueil intended that the work should have a didactic purpose for young noblemen. He therefore uses an Aristotelian structure to his work, dealing with the hero's career in three parts, which reflect three elements of governance or discipline: The young soldier learns about ethics and self-discipline, the military commander learns leadership of men and the regent learns the governance of a country. Le Jouvencel joins several medieval military literature traditions: Chivalric romance, treatises on chivalry and manuals on warfare. De Bueil draws upon earlier writers such as Honoré Bonet and Christine de Pizan but also on his own military experience. In so doing, he gives a rounded image of how a professional soldier thought about and practiced war at the end of the Middle Ages.

Le Jouvencel has been widely quoted by modern scholars of chivalry and medieval warfare. Traditionally, this has focussed on his writings on the nature of military life. He viewed the life of arms to be ennobling in itself and even to be a route to salvation. He is perhaps most quoted for his view on comradeship in arms

You love your comrade so much in war. When you see your quarrel is just and your blood is fighting well, tears rise to your eyes. A great sweet feeling of love and pity fills your heart on seeing your friend so valiantly exposing his body to execute and accomplish the command of our Creator. And then you prepare to go and live or die with him and for love not to abandon him. And out of that there arises such delectation, that he who has not tasted it is not fit to say what a delight is. Do you think that a man who does that fears death? Not at all: for he feels strengthened, he is so elated he does not know where he is. Truly he is afraid of nothing.

Recently, greater attention has been given to the practical activities described in the text; for example, how to conduct a raid or how to order an army on the march
