= Jean IV de Bueil =

Jean IV de Bueil (c. 1361? – 25 October 1415) was lord of Bueil-en-Touraine, son of Jean III de Bueil.

== Biography ==
Jean IV lived in the shadow of his father (an important royal official and military officer) until he succeeded him in November 1405. His father intended, however, that he be fully prepared to take his place. On 9 September 1386, for example, the company of Jean de Bueil “the younger”, knight bachelor, composed of 16 other knights, 179 squires, and 3 archers, was mustered at Mantes and scheduled to serve — under the command of Jean de Bueil “the elder” [knight banneret], who was under the command of Philip the Bold, duke of Burgundy — in the army Charles VI intended to lead in person against England, but the expedition had to be “postponed,” after long delays, because bad weather threatened to make a crossing of the Channel extremely hazardous.

In 1406, as lord of Saint-Calais (Sarthe), Jean was in a position of having to proceed with the court case involving the inhabitants of that castellany that was pending when his father died.

In 1414, he was a councillor and chamberlain of King Charles VI and also a chamberlain of Louis II of Anjou.

Jean married twice. By his first wife, whose name is unknown, he had a son named Jean, who was old enough to be making his own purchases when he died before 1 October 1412, leaving his father, as his heir, to pay a draper 50 livres 2 sous parisis. Jean married his second wife, Marguerite Dauphine of Auvergne (youngest daughter of Berald II), in 1404, and they had three children: Jean V de Bueil, count of Sancerre and admiral of France, Louis de Bueil, who died a few hours after sustaining a serious injury in a tournament in 1447, and Anne de Bueil, wife of Pierre d'Amboise.

Jean was killed at the Battle of Agincourt. It is known that his body was not recognized among those inspected on the field after the battle, since his wife said in February 1417 n.s. that, despite her inquiries, she could not learn any definite information about him.
