= Château de Meillant =

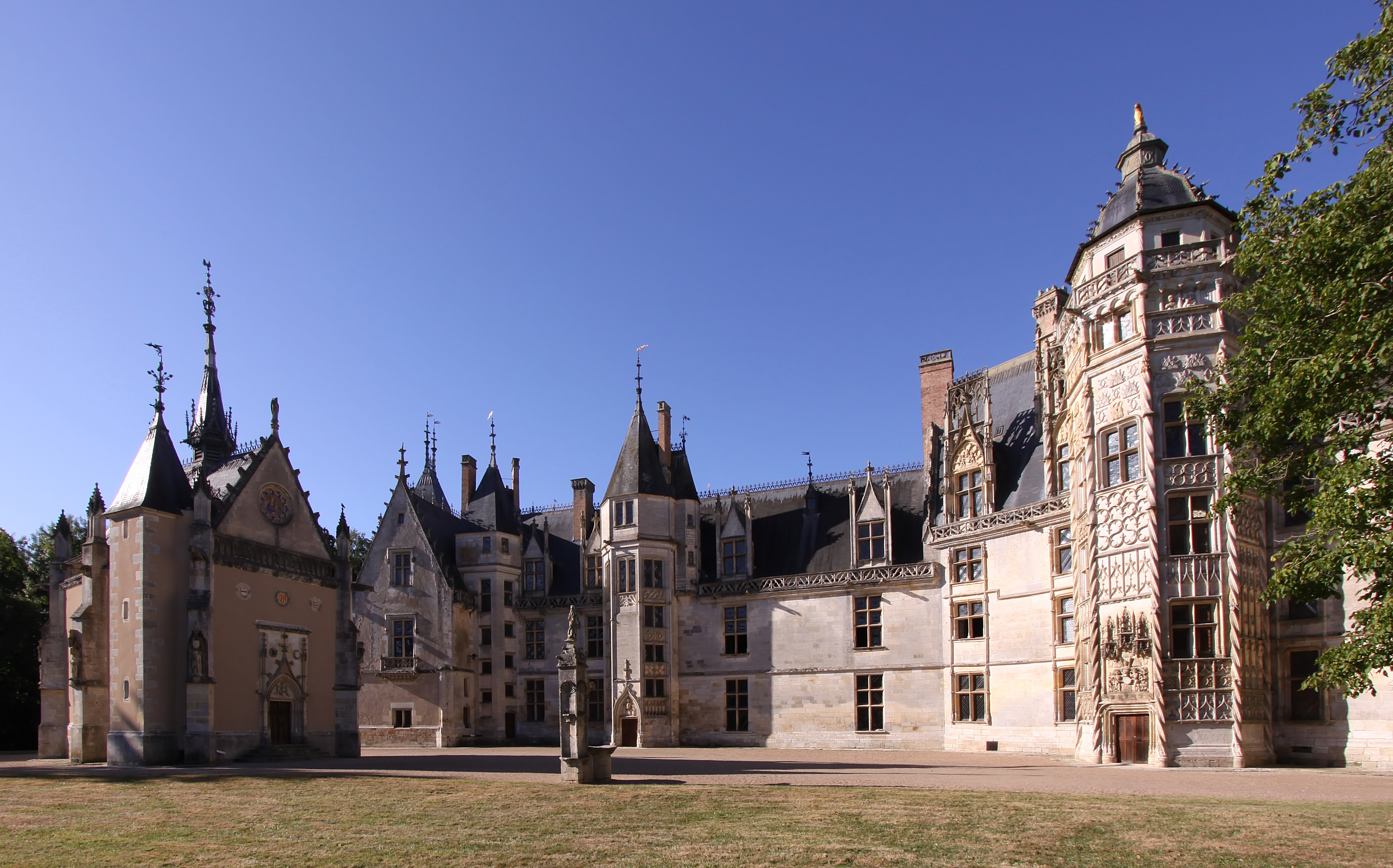

- Location within France

General information
- Coordinates: 46°46′59″N 2°30′15″E

The Château de Meillant is a historic manor in Meillant, Cher, Centre-Val de Loire, France.

== History ==
It was built in the 15th century.

== Architectural significance ==
It has been listed as an official monument since 1963.
