= Jacques d'Amboise (medical doctor) =

French doctor and surgeon

Jacques d'Amboise (1559–1606) was a French medical doctor and surgeon.

== Life ==
He was the son of Jean d'Amboise, ordinary surgeon to the king and was himself surgeon to Henry III, and got himself noticed when he dissected a woman before Ambroise Paré and several grand-masters of surgery aged only 20. He then became a doctor of medicine, then doctor to king Henry IV of France. In 1594, he was elected rector of the université de Paris. In 1596, he was made professor at the Collège royal, where the medicine chair is named after him.

The university's oath of loyalty to Henry IV and the trial that brought it under the Jesuits fell under his rectorate. As rector, he pronounced bloody harangues against the Jesuits to the parlement on 12 May and 13 July 1594.

Jacques d'Amboise was also the brother of François d'Amboise, king's advocate to the parlement de Paris, and of Adrien d'Amboise, almoner of Henry IV and bishop of Tréguier.

== Sources ==
- Pierre Bayle, Dictionnaire historique et critique, p. 177
- J. Balteau, Dictionnaire de biographie française, vol II
