= Chaumont-sur-Loire =

- Commune
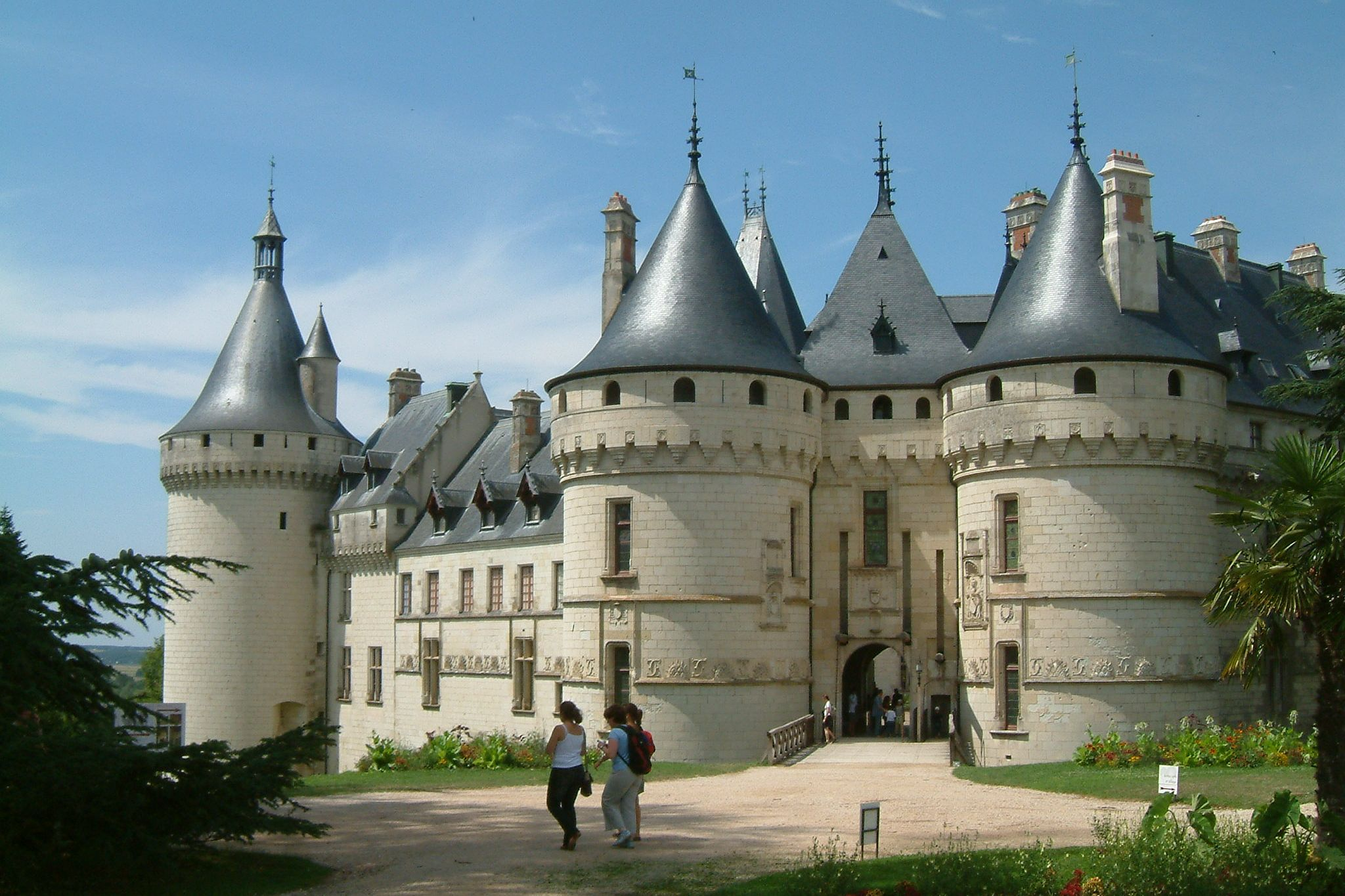
- Castle of Chaumont

- Coat of arms
- Location of Chaumont-sur-Loire
- Location within France Location within Centre-Val de Loire
- Coordinates: 47°28′51″N 1°11′11″E
- Country: France
- Region: Centre-Val de Loire
- Department: Loir-et-Cher
- Arrondissement: Blois
- Canton: Blois-3
- Intercommunality: Blois Agglopolys

Government
  - Mayor (2020–2026): Baptiste Marseault
- Area^{1}: 26.84 km^{2} (10.36 sq mi)
- Elevation: 65 m (213 ft)
- Highest elevation: 114 m (374 ft)
- Lowest elevation: 61 m (200 ft)
- Population (2023): 1,096
  - Density: 40.83/km^{2} (105.8/sq mi)
- Time zone: UTC+01:00 (CET)
  - Summer (DST): UTC+02:00 (CEST)
- INSEE/Postal code: 41045 /41150
- ^{1} French Land Register data, which excludes lakes, ponds, glaciers > 1 km^{2} (0.386 sq mi or 247 acres) and river estuaries.

Chaumont-sur-Loire (French pronunciation: [ʃomɔ̃ syʁ lwaʁ], lit. 'Chaumont on Loire'), commonly known as Chaumont, is a commune and town in the Loir-et-Cher department and the administrative region of Centre-Val de Loire, France, known for its historical defensive walls and its castle.

== Château de Chaumont-sur-Loire ==
The castle was founded by Odo 1 (973-996), Count of Blois. Throughout the castle's existence, it has been owned by numerous significant historical figures in French and European history. In the period between the late enlightenment and the romantic period, Germaine de Staël was resident from April to August 1810. Many famous guests visited the lively and politically active Madame de Staël including Madame Récamier, Adelbert von Chamisso, the counts of Sabran and Salaberry as well as the author of "Adolphe", Benjamin Constant.

== Gallery ==
=== Chaumont Garden Festival ===
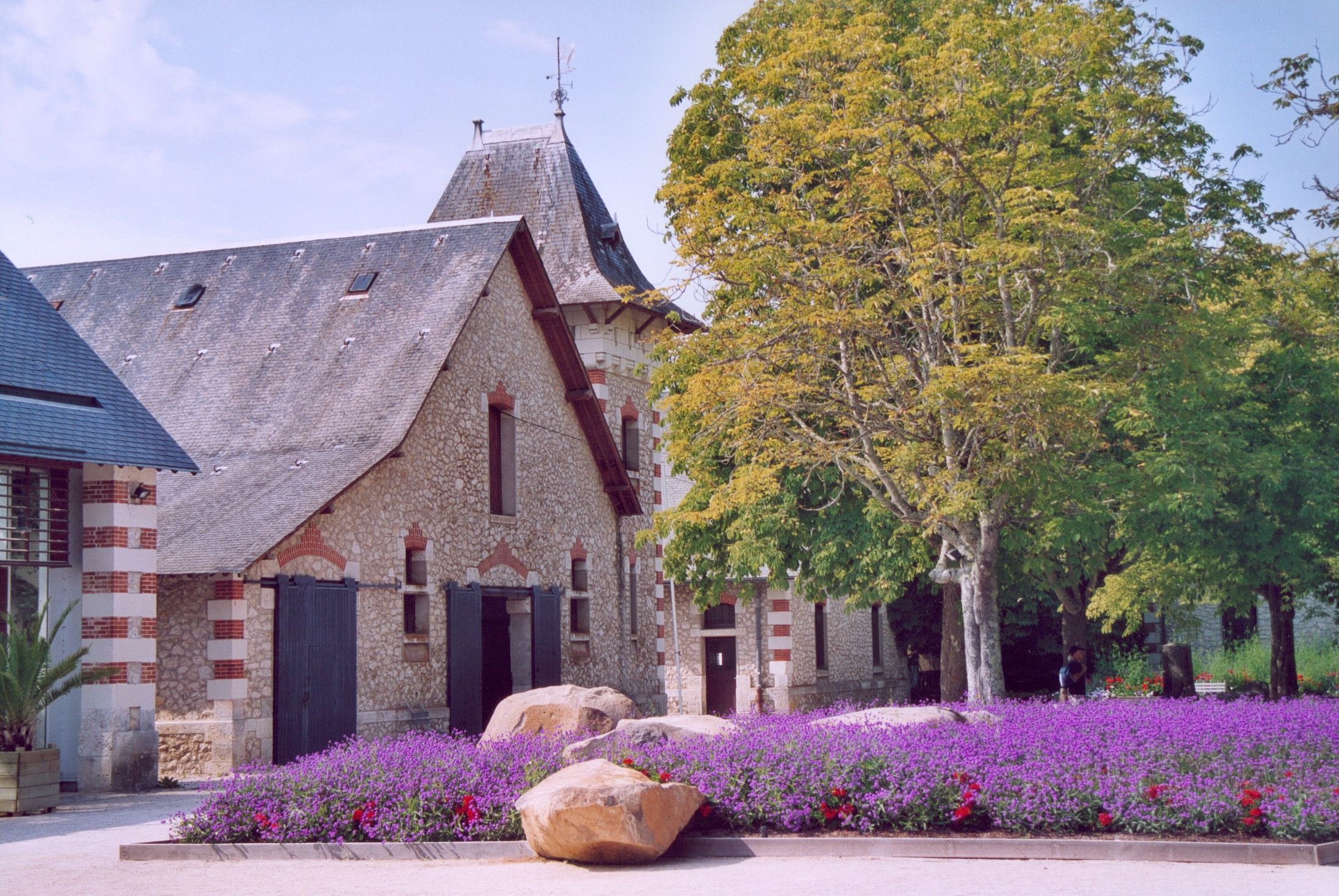

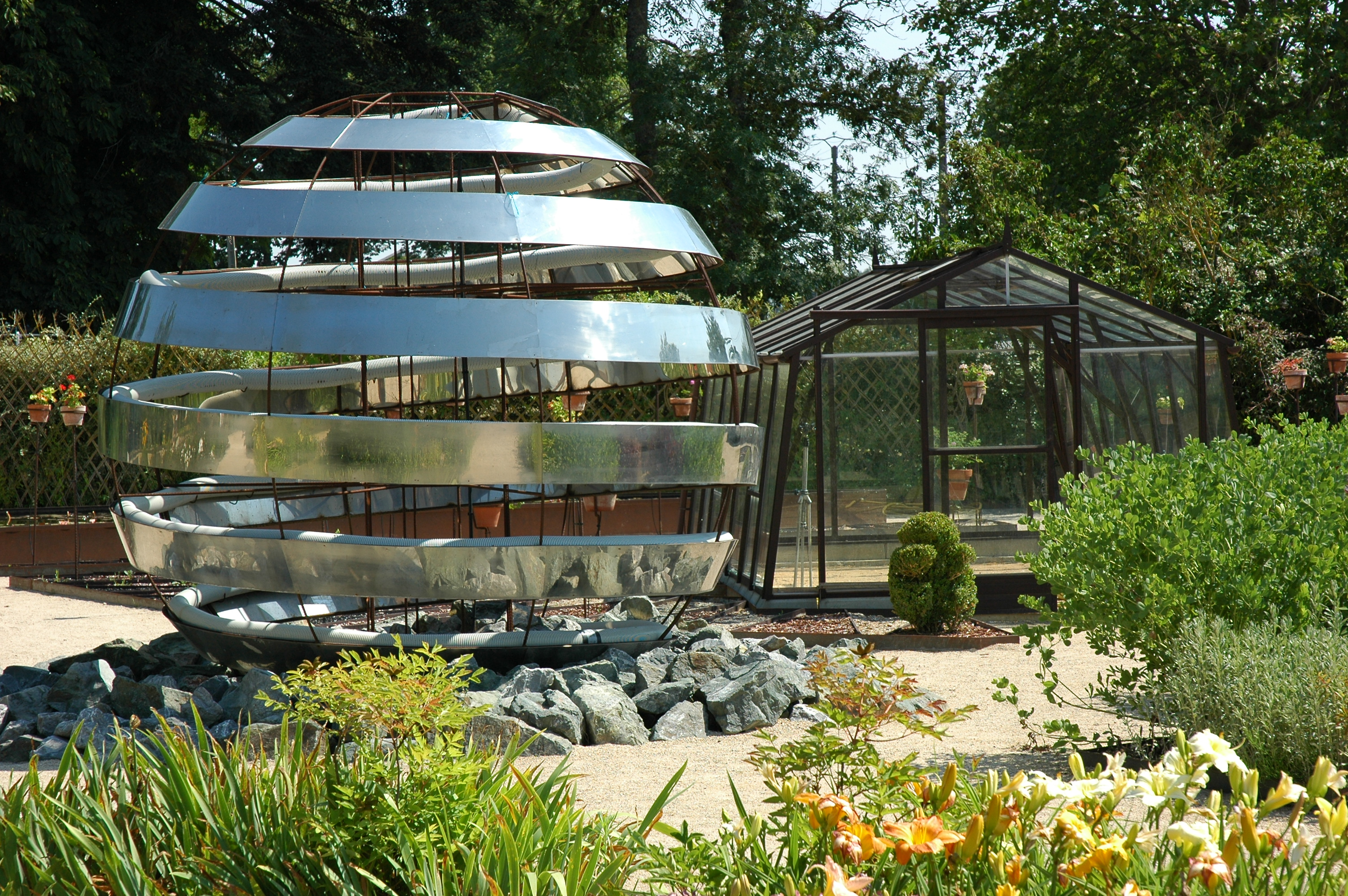

== Population ==
Historical population

| Year | Pop. | ±% p.a. |
|---|---|---|
| 1793 | 750 | — |
| 1800 | 832 | +1.49% |
| 1806 | 848 | +0.32% |
| 1821 | 930 | +0.62% |
| 1831 | 985 | +0.58% |
| 1836 | 935 | −1.04% |
| 1841 | 925 | −0.21% |
| 1846 | 957 | +0.68% |
| 1851 | 942 | −0.32% |
| 1856 | 953 | +0.23% |
| 1861 | 1,000 | +0.97% |
| 1866 | 1,000 | +0.00% |
| 1872 | 988 | −0.20% |
| 1876 | 945 | −1.11% |
| 1881 | 1,065 | +2.42% |
| 1886 | 1,103 | +0.70% |
| 1891 | 1,136 | +0.59% |
| 1896 | 1,092 | −0.79% |
| 1901 | 1,037 | −1.03% |

| Year | Pop. | ±% p.a. |
|---|---|---|
| 1906 | 1,064 | +0.52% |
| 1911 | 1,047 | −0.32% |
| 1921 | 937 | −1.10% |
| 1926 | 882 | −1.20% |
| 1931 | 779 | −2.45% |
| 1936 | 704 | −2.00% |
| 1946 | 796 | +1.24% |
| 1954 | 706 | −1.49% |
| 1962 | 705 | −0.02% |
| 1968 | 742 | +0.86% |
| 1975 | 783 | +0.77% |
| 1982 | 842 | +1.04% |
| 1990 | 876 | +0.50% |
| 1999 | 1,031 | +1.83% |
| 2007 | 1,023 | −0.10% |
| 2012 | 1,089 | +1.26% |
| 2017 | 1,086 | −0.06% |
| 2023 | 1,096 | +0.15% |

Source: EHESS (1793-1999) and INSEE

== See also ==
- Château de Chaumont
- Communes of the Loir-et-Cher department
