= House of Amboise =

Arms of the House of Amboise

The House of Amboise was one of the oldest families of the French nobility whose followed filiation dated back to the early twelfth century. It took its name from the town of Amboise in Touraine.

The house of Amboise formed the two branches of Thouars (extinct in 1469 in the house of La Trémoille) and Chaumont (extinct in 1525) that gave the branches of Bussy (extinct in 1515) and Aubijoux (extinct in 1656).

Cardinal Georges d'Amboise (1460–1510) was the son of Pierre d'Amboise, Seigneur de Chaumont.

== History ==
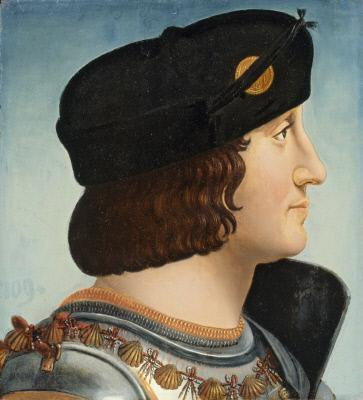
Charles d'Amboise oil portrait by Bernardino de Conti. A faded 1109 on the left indicates the family's ascension to the throne.

=== Origins ===
First house of Amboise (circa 1100-extinct in 1255)

The first house of Amboise was founded in the eleventh century by Lisois, who was appointed as captain of the castle of Amboise by Foulk III Nerra, Count of Anjou.

Geoffrey II, Count of Anjou gave to Lisois some Lands in Amboise to reward him. Lisois became lord of Amboise and died about 1061. His grandson Hugues I of Amboise came to power in 1107. He is most known for his seizure of Montrichard Castle which marked a significant land expansion for the family. Many of the d'Amboise members marked the year 1109 on their portraits to commemorate the event.

Second house of Amboise (1255-extinct 1656)

Renaud lord of Berrie in Loudunnois who was living in 1206 (grandson of Pierre lord of Berrie living in 1100) married Marguerite d'Amboise, daughter of Hugues III lord of Amboise.

The second house of Amboise was founded by Jean of Berrie, his son, who succeeded to the lords of Amboise and Chaumont sur Loire in 1255, after the death of his cousin Mahaud lady of Amboise, Countess of Chartres, daughter of Sulpice III Lord of Amboise.

Jean of Berrie took the name & arms of Amboise and died in his castle of Berrie in 1274. His descendants formed the two branches of the house of Amboise : Thouars and Chaumont.

The history of the first house of Amboise is told in the Book of the Construction of the Castle of Amboise and the Deeds of Its Lords.

=== Branch of Thouars (elder) ===
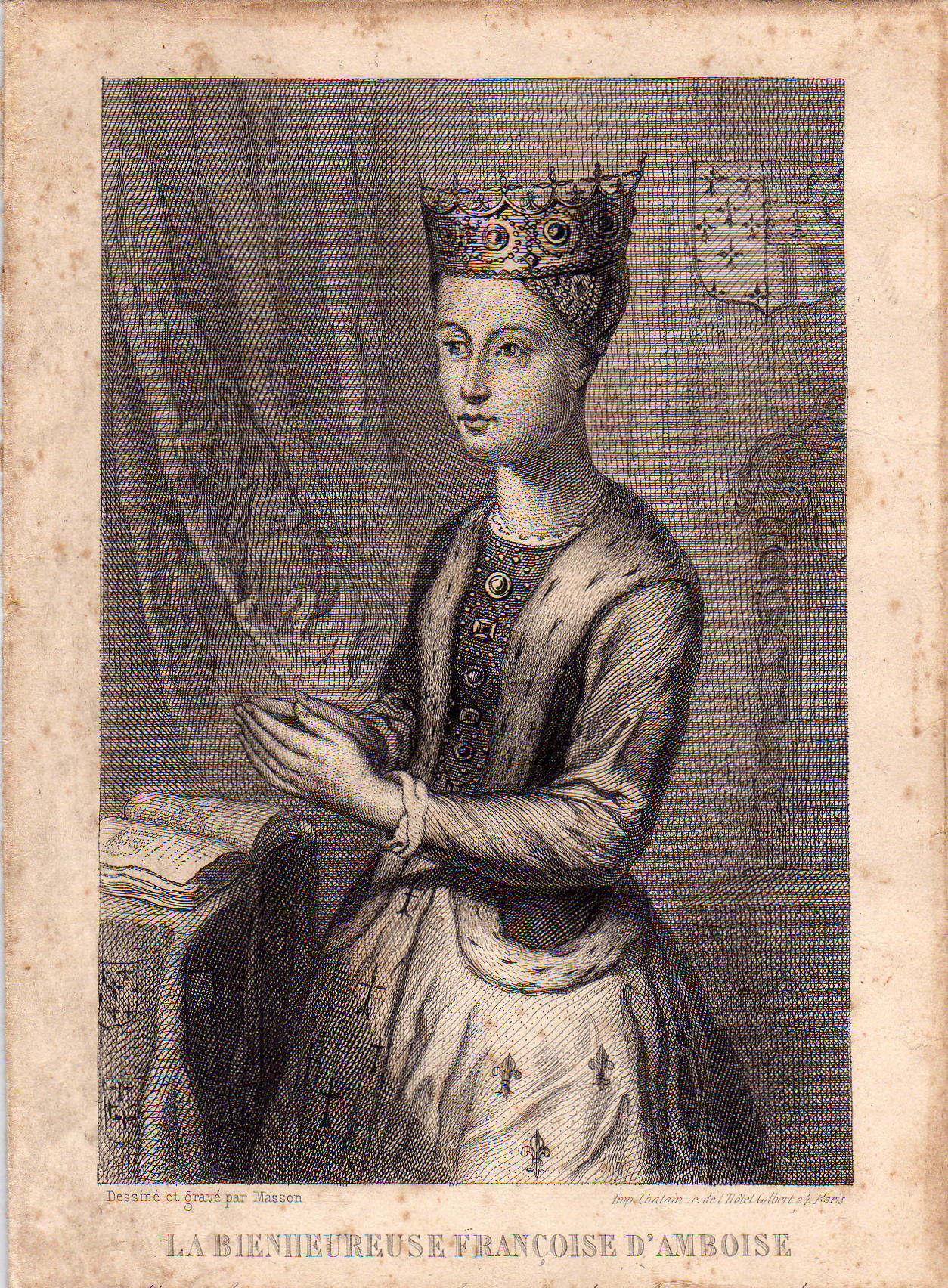
Françoise of Amboise (1427-1485) duchess of Brittany.

This elder branch was founded by Pierre II of Amboise, who became Viscount of Thouars in 1397 after the death of Perronelle of Thouars, his maternal aunt. His mother was Isabelle of Thouars, Countess of Dreux, daughter of Louis Viscount of Thouars and Jeanne Countess of Dreux. The branch of Thouars ended in 1470 by the death of Louis of Amboise who had no son.

=== Branch of Chaumont (younger) ===
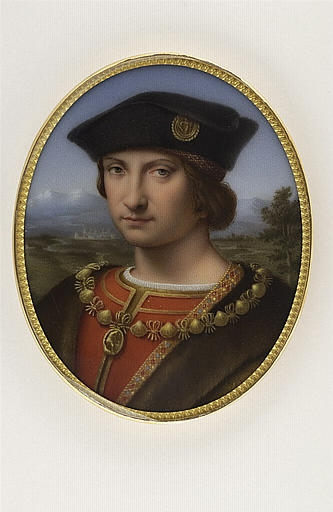
Charles II of Amboise (1473-1511).

This branch was founded by Hugues I of Amboise, lord of Chaumont, married in 1304 to Jeanne of Saint-Verain. The branch of Chaumont ended in 1525 with George of Amboise (son of Charles II of Amboise) who died at the Battle of Pavia.

The house of Amboise ended in 1656 with François-Jacques of Amboise, count of Aubijoux who died on November 9, 1656.
