= Cardinals created by Alexander VI =

Catholic appointments from 1492 to 1503

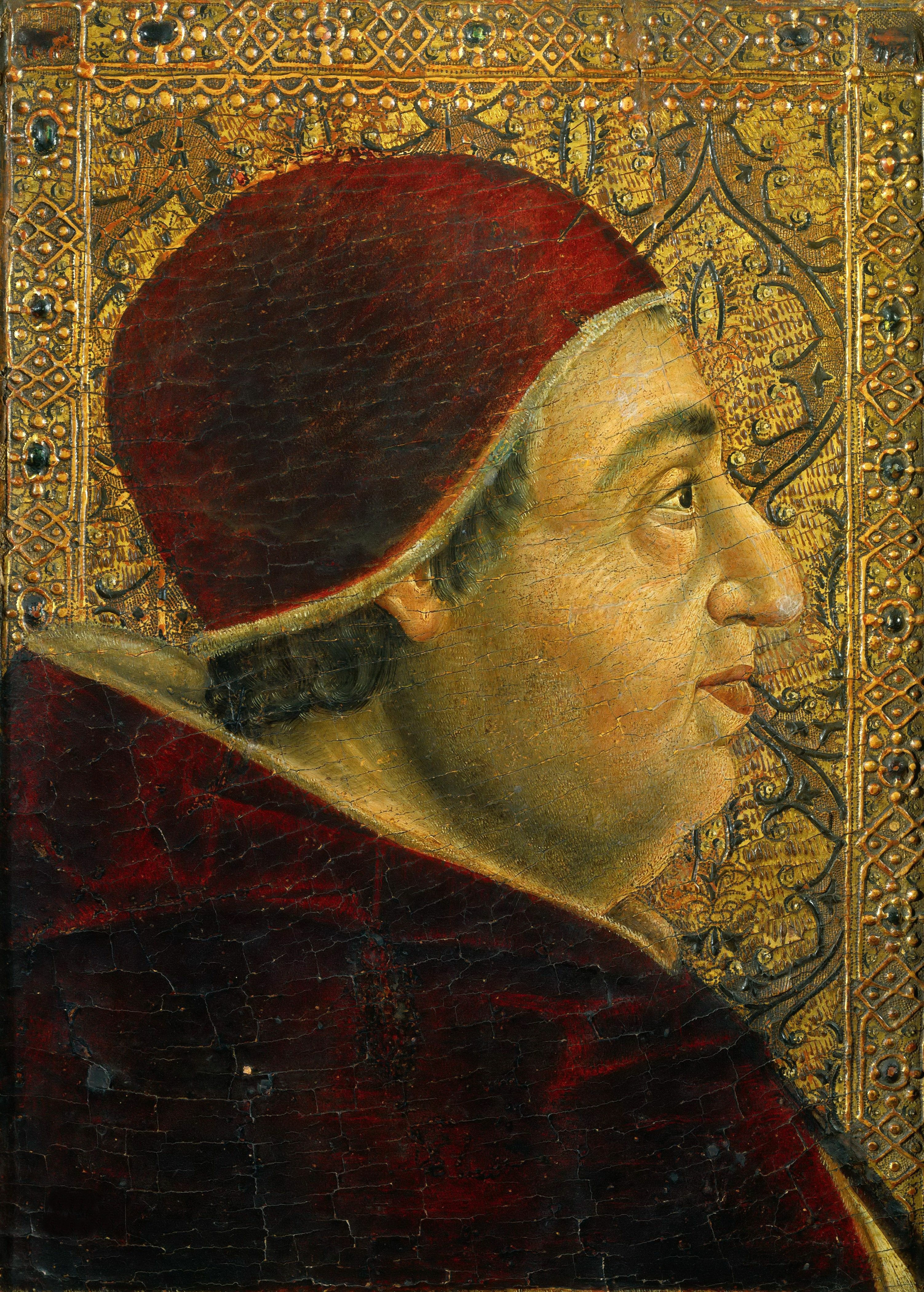
Pope Alexander VI (r. 1492–1503)

Pope Alexander VI (r. 1492–1503) created 43 new cardinals in 9 consistories:

== 31 August 1492 ==
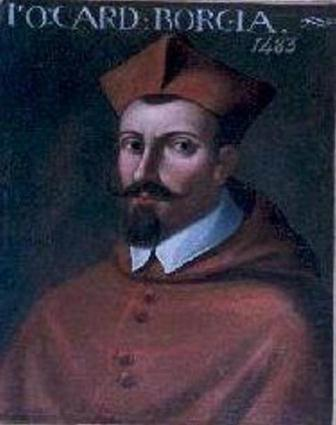
Juan de Borja Lanzol (Llançol) de Romaní, el mayor

1. Juan de Borja-Llanzol (Llançol) de Romani, papal nephew, archbishop of Monreale – cardinal-priest of S. Susanna, † 1 August 1503

== 20 September 1493 ==
All the new cardinals received the titles on 23 September 1493.

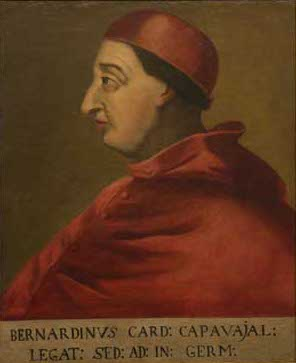
Bernardino López de Carvajal (1455-1523), made a cardinal on September 20, 1493.

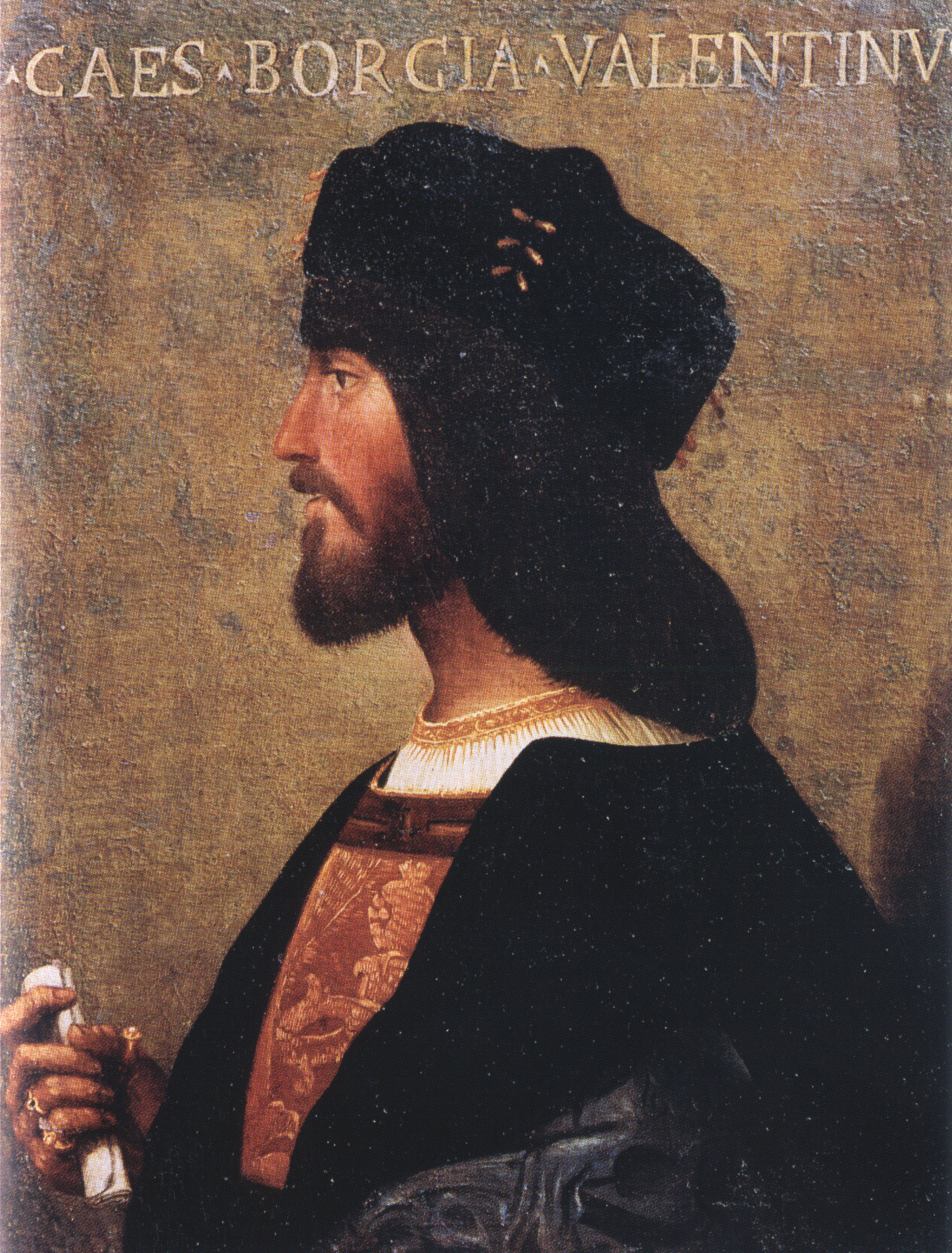
Cesare Borgia (1475-1507), made a cardinal on September 20, 1493.

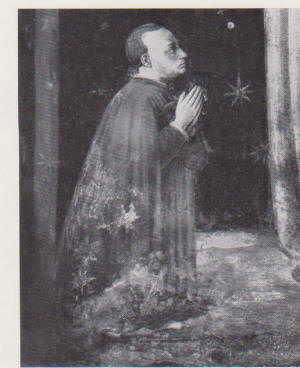
Giuliano Cesarini (1466-1510), made a cardinal on September 20, 1493.

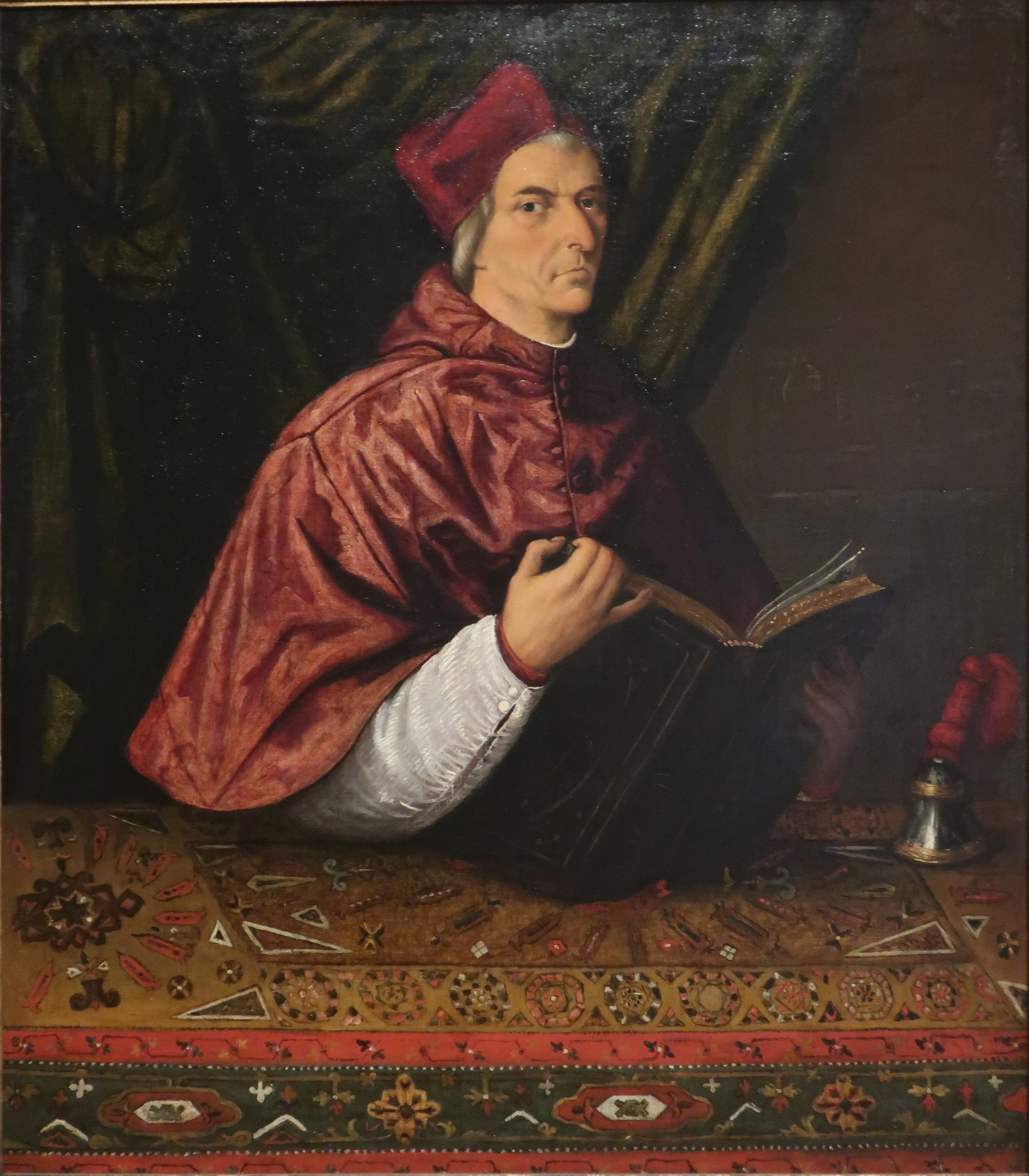
Domenico Grimani (1461-1523), made a cardinal on September 20, 1493.

1. Jean Bilhères de Lagraulas, O.S.B., bishop of Lombès, ambassador of the King of France – cardinal-priest of S. Sabina, † 6 August 1499
2. Giovanni Antonio Sangiorgio, bishop of Alessandria – cardinal-priest of SS. Nereo ed Achilleo, then cardinal-bishop of Tusculum (23 December 1503), cardinal-bishop of Palestrina (17 September 1507), cardinal-bishop of Sabina (22 September 1508), † 14 March 1509
3. Bernardino López de Carvajal, bishop of Cartagena – cardinal-priest of SS. Marcelino e Pietro, then cardinal-priest of S. Croce in Gerusalmme (2 February 1495), cardinal-bishop of Albano (3 August 1507), cardinal-bishop of Tusculum (17 September 1507), cardinal-bishop of Palestrina (22 September 1508), cardinal-bishop of Sabina (28 March 1509); excommunicated and deposed on 24 October 1511 for his participation in the schismatic pseudo-council of Pisa; reinstated on 27 June 1513 as cardinal-bishop of Sabina, then cardinal-bishop of Ostia e Velletri (24 July 1521), † 16 December 1523
4. Cesare Borgia, Son of the Pope – cardinal-deacon of S. Maria Nuova; resigned his cardinalate on 18 August 1498, † 12 March 1507
5. Giuliano Cesarini, iuniore – cardinal-deacon of SS. Sergio e Bacco, then cardinal-deacon of S. Angelo (12 June 1503), † 1 May 1510
6. Domenico Grimani – cardinal-deacon of S. Nicola inter Imagines, then cardinal-priest of S. Nicola inter Imagines (28 March 1498), cardinal-priest of S. Marco (25 December 1503), cardinal-bishop of Albano (22 September 1508), cardinal-bishop of Tusculum (3 June 1509), cardinal-bishop of Porto e Santa Rufina (20 January 151), † 27 August 1523
7. Alessandro Farnese – cardinal-deacon of SS. Cosma e Damiano, then cardinal-deacon of S. Eustachio (11 October 1503), cardinal-bishop of Tusculum (15 June 1519), cardinal-bishop of Palestrina (9 December 1523), cardinal-bishop of Sabina (18 December 1523), cardinal-bishop of Porto e Santa Rufina (20 May 1524), cardinal-bishop of Ostia e Velletri (15 June 1524), became Pope Paul III on 13 October 1534, † 10 November 1549
8. Bernardino Lunati – cardinal-deacon of S. Ciriaco, † 8 August 1497
9. Raymond Peraudi, O.S.A., bishop of Gurk – cardinal-deacon of S. Maria in Cosmedin, then cardinal-priest of S. Vitale (1494), cardinal-priest of S. Maria Nuova (29 April 1499), † 5 September 1505
10. John Morton, archbishop of Canterbury – cardinal-priest of S. Anastasia, † 15 September 1500
11. Fryderyk Jagiellończyk, administrator of Kraków – cardinal-priest of S. Lucia in Septisolio, † 14 March 1503
12. Ippolito d'Este, administrator of Esztergom – cardinal-deacon of S. Lucia in Silice, † 3 September 1520

== May 1494 ==
1. Luigi d'Aragona – cardinal-deacon of S. Maria in Cosmedin, † 21 January 1519

== 16 January 1495 ==
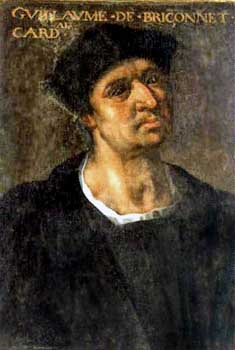
Guillaume Briçonnet (d. 1514), made a cardinal on January 16, 1495.

1. Guillaume Briçonnet, bishop of St.-Malo – cardinal-priest of S. Pudenziana, then cardinal-bishop of Albano (17 September 1507), cardinal-bishop of Tusculum (22 September 1508), cardinal-bishop of Palestrina (3 June 1509); excommunicated and deposed on 24 October 1511 for his participation in the schismatic pseudo-council of Pisa; reinstated on 7 April 1514 as cardinal-priest of S. Pudenziana, † 14 December 1514

== 21 January 1495 ==
1. Philippe de Luxembourg, bishop of Le Mans – cardinal-priest of SS. Marcellino e Pietro (received the title on 2 February 1495), then cardinal-bishop of Albano (3 June 1509), cardinal-bishop of Tusculum (20 January 1511), † 2 June 1519

== 19 February 1496 ==
All the new cardinals received the titles on 24 February 1496.

1. Juan López, bishop of Perugia – cardinal-priest of S. Maria in Trastevere, † 5 August 1501
2. Bartolomé Martí, bishop of Segorbe – cardinal-deacon of S. Agata in Suburra, † 25 March 1500
3. Juan de Castro, bishop of Agrigento – cardinal-priest of S. Prisca, † 29 September 1506
4. Juan de Borja Lanzol de Romaní, el menor, relative of the Pope, bishop-elect of Melfi – cardinal-deacon of S. Maria in Via Lata, † 17 January 1500

== 17 September 1498 ==
1. Georges d'Amboise, archbishop of Rouen – cardinal-priest of S. Sisto, † 25 May 1510

== 28 September 1500 ==
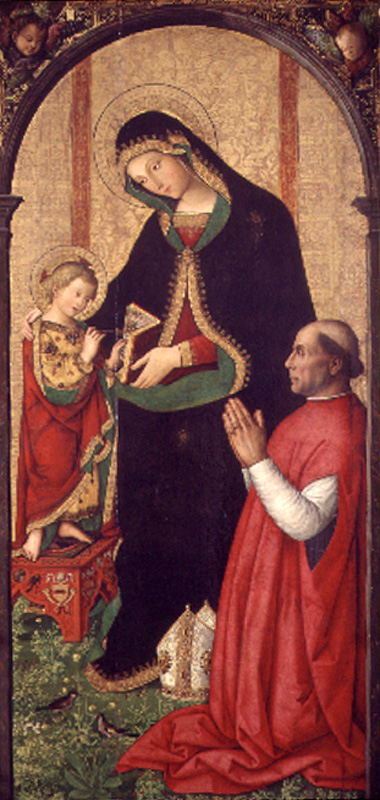
Francisco de Borja (1441-1511), made a cardinal on September 28, 1500.

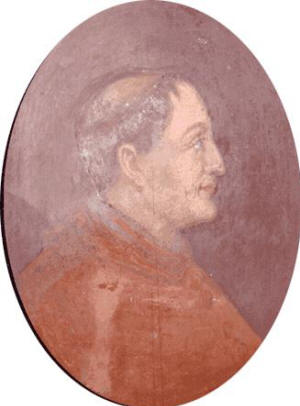
Gianstefano Ferrero (1474-1510), made a cardinal on September 28, 1500.

1. Diego Hurtado de Mendoza y Quiñones, archbishop of Seville – cardinal-priest of S. Sabina (received the title on 5 October 1500), † 14 October 1502
2. Amanieu d'Albret – cardinal-deacon of S. Nicola in Carcere (received the title on 5 October 1500), † 20 December 1520
3. Pedro Luis de Borja Lanzol de Romaní, O.S.Io.Hieros., archbishop-elect of Valencia – cardinal-deacon of S. Maria in Via Lata (received the title on 5 October 1500), then cardinal-priest of S. Marcello (7 December 1503), † 4 October 1511
4. Jaume Serra i Cau, archbishop of Oristano – cardinal-priest of S. Vitale (received the title on 5 October 1500), then cardinal-priest of S. Clemente (28 June 1502), cardinal-bishop of Albano (20 January 1511), † 15 March 1517
5. Pietro Isvalies, archbishop of Reggio di Calabria – cardinal-priest of S. Ciriaco (received the title on 5 October 1500), then cardinal-priest of S. Pudenziana (18 August 1507), † 22 September 1511
6. Francisco de Borja, archbishop of Cosenza – cardinal-priest of S. Cecilia (received the title on 5 October 1500), then cardinal-priest of SS. Nero ed Achilleo (11 August 1506), † 4 November 1511
7. Juan de Vera, archbishop of Salerno – cardinal-priest of S. Balbina (received the title on 5 October 1500), † 4 May 1507
8. Ludovico Prodocator, bishop of Capacio – cardinal-priest of S. Agata in Suburra (received the title on 5 October 1500), † 25 August 1504
9. Antonio Trivulzio, O.C.R.S.A., bishop of Como – cardinal-priest of S. Anastasia (received the title probably in November 1500), then cardinal-priest of S. Stefano in Monte Celio (1 July 1504), † 18 March 1508
10. Giovanni Baptista Ferrari, bishop of Modena – cardinal-priest of S. Crisogono (received the title on 5 October 1500), † 20 July 1502
11. Tamás Bakócz, archbishop of Esztergom, chancellor of the Kingdom of Hungary – cardinal-priest of SS. Silvestro e Martino (received the title probably in November 1500), † 11 June 1521
12. Marco Cornaro – cardinal-deacon of S. Maria in Portico (received the title on 5 October 1500), then cardinal-deacon of S. Maria in Via Lata (19 March 1513), cardinal-priest of S. Marco (14 December 1523), cardinal-bishop of Albano (20 May 124), cardinal-bishop of Palestrina (15 June 1524), † 24 July 1524
13. Gianstefano Ferrero, bishop of Vercelli (in pectore, published on 28 June 1502) – cardinal-priest of S. Vitale (received the title on 28 June 1502), then cardinal-priest of SS. Sergio e Bacco (22 December 1505), † 5 October 1510

== 31 May 1503 ==
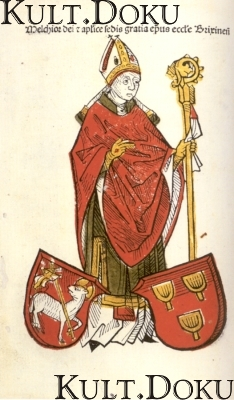
Melchior von Meckau (1440-1509), made a cardinal on May 31, 1503.

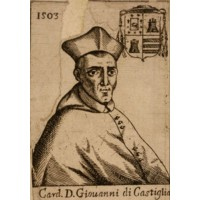
Juan Castellar y de Borja (1441-1505), made a cardinal on May 31, 1503.

1. Juan Castellar y de Borja, archbishop of Trani – cardinal-priest of S. Maria in Trastevere (received the title on 12 June 1503), † 1 January 1505
2. Francisco de Remolins, archbishop of Sorrento – cardinal-priest of SS. Giovanni e Paolo (received the title on 12 June 1503), then cardinal-priest of S. Marcello (27 October 1511), cardinal-bishop of Albano (16 March 1517), † 5 February 1518
3. Francesco Soderini, bishop of Volterra – cardinal-priest of S. Susanna (received the title probably on 11 October 1503), then cardinal-priest of SS. XII Apostoli (15 September 1508), cardinal-bishop of Sabina (29 October 1511), cardinal-bishop of Tivoli (27 June 1513), cardinal-bishop of Palestrina (18 July 1516), cardinal-bishop of Porto e Santa Rufina (9 December 1523), cardinal-bishop of Ostia e Velletri (18 December 1523), † 17 May 1524
4. Melchior von Meckau, bishop of Brixen – cardinal-priest of S. Nicola inter Imagines (received the title on 25 December 1503), then cardinal-priest of S. Stefano in Monte Celio (4 January 1509?), † 3 March 1509
5. Niccolò Fieschi, bishop-elect of Fréjus – cardinal-priest of S. Lucia in Septisolio (received the title on 12 June 1503), then cardinal-priest of S. Prisca (5 October 1506), cardinal-bishop of Albano (5 February 1518), cardinal-bishop of Sabina (24 July 1521), cardinal-bishop of Porto e Santa Rufina (18 December 1523), cardinal-bishop of Ostia e Velletri (20 May 1524), † 15 June 1524
6. Francisco Desprats, bishop of Leon – cardinal-priest of SS. Sergio e Bacco (received the title on 12 June 1503), † 10 September 1504
7. Adriano Castellesi, bishop of Hereford – cardinal-priest of S. Crisogono (received the title on 12 June 1503); excommunicated and deposed on 5 July 1518, † December 1521
8. Jaime de Casanova – cardinal-priest of S. Stefano in Monte Celio (received the title on 12 June 1503), † 4 June 1504
9. Francisco Lloris y de Borja, bishop of Elne – cardinal-deacon of S. Sabina (received the title on 12 June 1503), then cardinal-deacon of S. Maria Nuova (17 December 1505), † 22 July 1506

== Sources ==
- Miranda, Salvador. "Consistories for the creation of Cardinals 15th Century (1394-1503): Alexander VI". The Cardinals of the Holy Roman Church. Florida International University. OCLC 53276621.
- Konrad Eubel, Hierarchia Catholica, vol. II, Münster 1914 and vol. III, Münster 1922
