= Cardinal of Monreale =

The Cardinal of Monreale may refer to:

- Juan de Borja Lanzol de Romaní, el mayor (1446-1503), Bishop of Monreale 1483–1503, Cardinal 1492-1503
- Juan Castellar y de Borja (1441-1505), Bishop of Monreale 1503–05, Cardinal 1503-05
