= Giovanni Battista Ferrari =

Giovanni Battista Ferrari may refer to:

- Giovanni Baptista Ferrari, Italian Jesuit and botanist
- Giovanni Battista Ferrari (cardinal)
