= Juan de Borja =

Juan de Borja may refer to:

- Juan de Borja Lanzol de Romaní, el mayor (1446–1503), held various positions in the Catholic Church, including archbishop of Monreale
- Juan de Borja Lanzol de Romaní, el menor (1470–1500), held various positions in the Catholic Church, including Papal Legate under his grand-uncle, Pope Alexander VI
- Juan Castellar y de Borja (1441–1505), held various positions in the Catholic Church, including Archbishop of Trani
- Juan Buenaventura de Borja y Armendia (1564–1628), held various positions in the New Kingdom of Granada, present day Colombia
- Juan de Borja y Enríquez de Luna (1495–1543), 3rd Duke of Gandía

== See also ==
- Juan Borja (motorcycle racer) (born 1970), Spanish Grand Prix rider
- Juan Joya Borja (1956–2021), Spanish comedian and actor known by the stage name El Risitas
- Giovanni Borgia (disambiguation)
