= Giovanni Borgia =

Giovanni Borgia may refer to:

- Giovanni Borgia (Infans Romanus) (1498–1548), parentage unclear
- Giovanni Borgia, 2nd Duke of Gandia (1474/5–1497), son of Pope Alexander VI
- Juan de Borja y Enríquez de Luna (1495–1543), in Italian, Giovanni Borgia, 3rd duke of Gandía, son of the 2nd duke and Maria Enriquez de Luna

== See also ==
- Juan de Borja (disambiguation)
