= San Crisogono =

Roman Catholic basilica, a landmark of Rome, Italy

- Basilica of Saint Chrysogonus (in English); Sancti Crisogoni (in Latin)
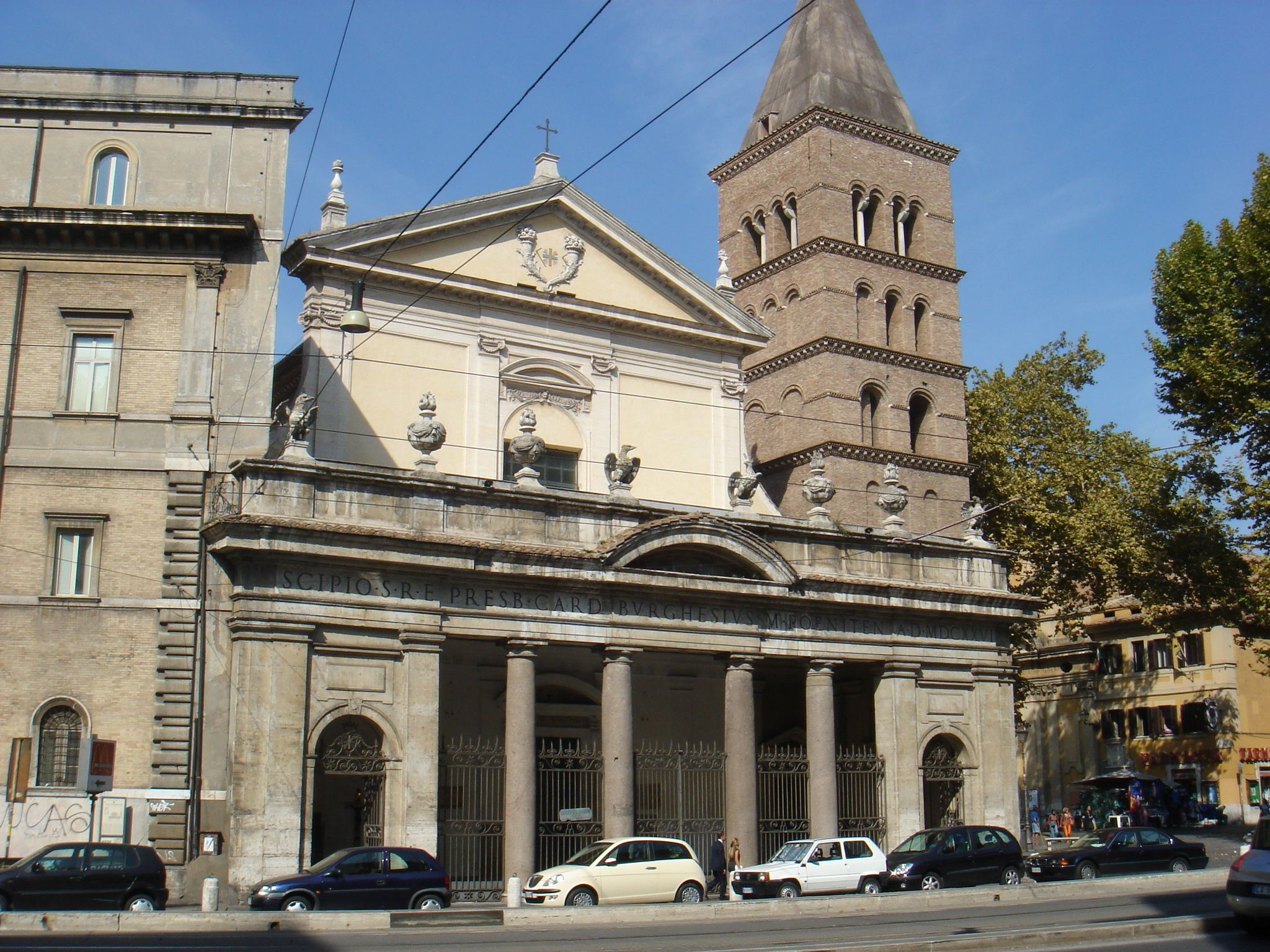
- The church
- Click on the map for a fullscreen view
- 41°53′21″N 12°28′25″E
- Location: Piazza Sonnino 44, Rome
- Country: Italy
- Denomination: Roman Catholic
- Tradition: Roman Rite
- Religious order: Trinitarians

History
- Status: Titular church, Minor basilica, General Curia of the Trinitarian Order
- Dedication: Saint Chrysogonus

Architecture
- Architect: Giovanni Battista Soria
- Architectural type: Church
- Style: Romanesque (campanile), Baroque (basilica)
- Groundbreaking: 4th century AD?
- Completed: 17th century

Administration
- District: Lazio
- Province: Rome

Basilica di San Crisogono (English: Basilica of Saint Chrysogonos) is a titular church and minor basilica located in Trastevere, Rome. Established in the 4th century under Pope Sylvester I, it is one of the oldest parish churches in the city and has served as a cardinal titular church since early Christianity. The present basilica, reconstructed under Cardinal Scipione Borghese in the early 17th century, is notable for its Baroque interior, and the extensive remains of the early Christian church preserved beneath the crypt. Today, San Crisogono remains an active parish and is also part of the traditional stational liturgy observed during Lent.

== History ==
Built in the 4th century under Pope Sylvester I (r. 314–335), San Crisogono is one of the first parish churches of Rome. Chrysogonus was martyred in Aquileia, probably during the persecution of Diocletian, was buried there, and publicly venerated by the faithful of that region. Very early, the veneration of this martyr was transferred to Rome. The first mention of the church (Titulus Chrysogoni) is in the signatures of the Roman Synod of 499. It is possible that the founder of the church was a certain Chrysogonus, and that, on account of the similarity of name, the church was soon devoted to the veneration of the martyr of Aquileia; it is also possible that from the beginning, for some unknown reason, it was consecrated to St. Chrysogonus and takes its name from him.

In 731, Pope Gregory III restored the church and founded a monastery dedicated to Sancti Stephani, Laurentii et Chrysogoni. The original monks were of the Byzantine rite. The church was rebuilt in 1123 by John of Crema, and again in 1626 by Giovanni Battista Soria, funded by Scipione Borghese.

A further renovation was carried out in the mid-1860s, shortly after the basilica was placed in the care of the Trinitarian Order.

== Art and architecture ==
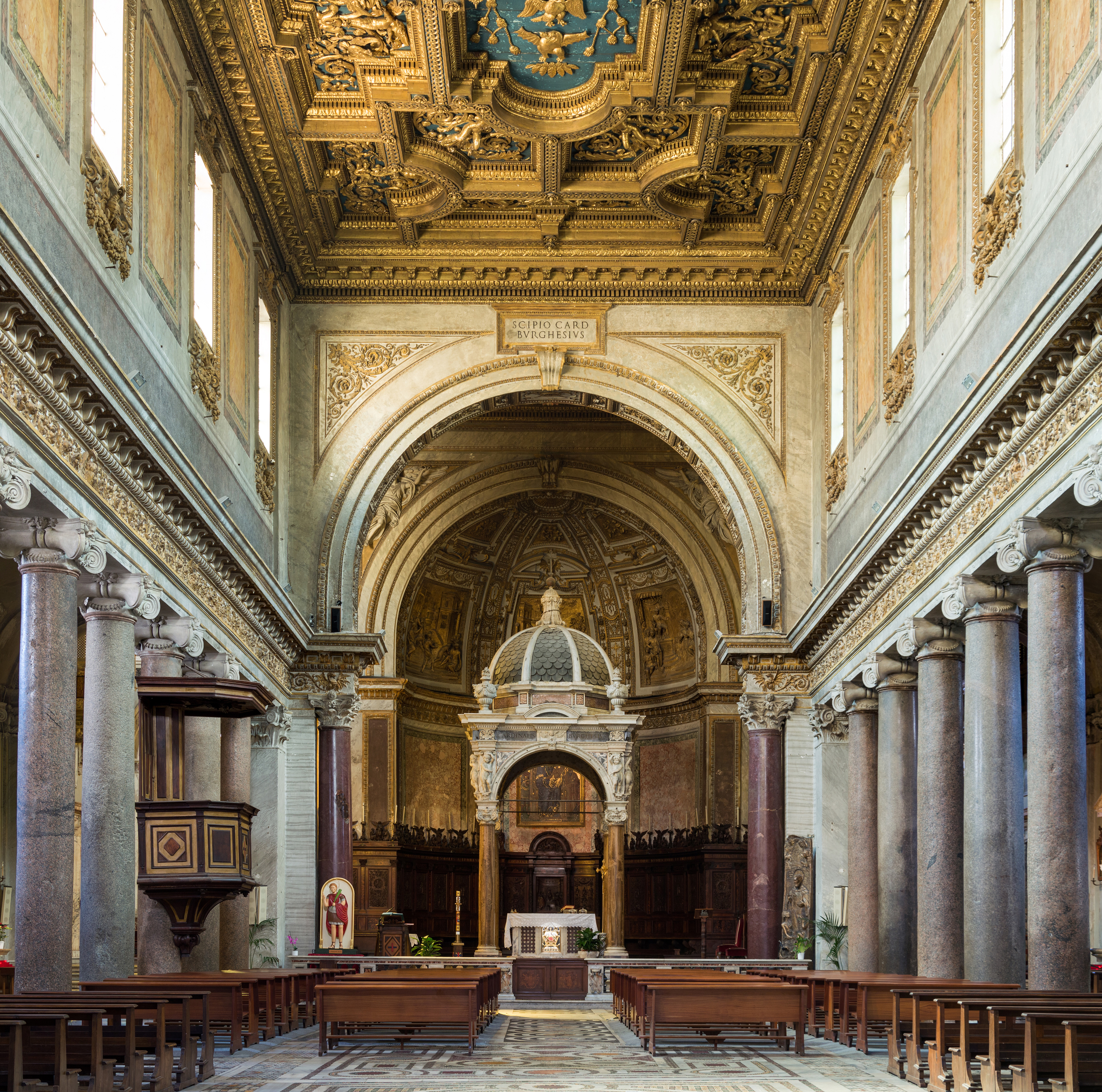
Interior

The bell tower dates from the 12th-century rebuilding. The interior of the church was rebuilt in the 1620s on the site of a 12th-century church. The 22 granite columns in the nave are reused antique columns. The floor is cosmatesque. The confessio in the sanctuary area is from the 8th century. The high altar is from 1127, with a baldachino from (1627 or 1641) by G.B Soria.

The painting in the middle of the Baroque coffered ceiling is by Guercino, and depicts the Glory of Saint Chrysogonus. It is likely a copy of the original, which is thought to have been taken to London.

On the left side of the nave is the shrine of Blessed Anna Maria Taigi, buried here in the habit of a tertiary of the Trinitarians. Blessed Anna Maria Taigi (1769–1837) was a Christian mystic beatified in 1920. Above the altar is a painting by Aronne Del Vecchio of the Trinitarian Saints in Glory. Visitors can view some of her other belongings in the adjacent monastery, where they are venerated as relics.

The monument to the left of the entrance, dedicated to Cardinal Giovanno Jacopo Millo was completed by Carlo Marchionni and Pietro Bracci. Along the right side of the nave are the remains of frescoes, including a Santa Francesca Romana and a Crucifixion, attributed to Paolo Guidotti and transferred from the Church of Saints Barbara and Catherine. The nave also displays a painting of Three Archangels by Giovanni da San Giovanni and a Trinity and Angels by Giacinto Gimignani, while the altar has a Guardian Angel by Ludovico Gimignani. The presbytery and ciborium (or baldachin), created by Soria, are surrounded by four alabaster columns. The apse has frescoes of the Life of Saint Crisogono (16th century) above a Madonna & Child with Saints Crisogono & James by the 12th-century school of Pietro Cavallini. The presbytery vault is frescoed with a Virgin by Giuseppe Cesari.

The inscriptions found in San Crisogono, a valuable source illustrating the history of the church, have been collected and published by Vincenzo Forcella.

== Excavations ==
Remains from the first church, possibly from the reign of Constantine I were discovered in 1907, and are accessed by a staircase in the sacristy. A semi-circular apse is visible. Brickwork in the apse area, datable to the 2nd century, seem to relate to a fairly high-status private house, part of which was converted into a church in the 4th century. The church had a single nave.

On either side of the apse are rooms known as pastophoria, service rooms of a type common in Eastern churches. The one on the right-hand side is thought to have been used as a diaconium, with functions resembling those of the sacristy. The other may have been a baptistry. A number of basins found there during the excavations, including one cut into the south wall, could mean that it was a fullonica, a laundry and dye-house. The area was a commercial district at the time, so this is quite likely. Others think that the basin in the south wall was made for baptism by immersion. As there were other basins too, it seems more likely that it was originally intended for a different use, but it may very well have been used as a baptismal font after the building had been consecrated as a church.

Benedictines acquired the premises in the 10th century and added a series of frescoes depicting scenes from the life of Benedict of Nursia. Other frescoes are from the 8th to the 11th century, and include Pope Sylvester Capturing the Dragon, St Pantaleon Healing the Blind Man, and The Rescue of St Placid.

Several sarcophagi have been preserved here, some beautifully decorated. Below the first church are remains of earlier Roman houses.

== Liturgy ==
The shrine was for many centuries the national church of the Sardinians and the Corsicans resident in Rome. Starting with the 16th century, the Corsicans immigrated in the city settled in the Tiber Island and in that part of Trastevere lying between the Port of Ripa Grande and the church. In the interior are buried several commanders of the Corsican Guard, a militia analogue to the Swiss guard, which was active in Rome between the 15th and the 17th century.

The feast day of St Chrysogonus, 24 November, is also the dedication day of the church. Pilgrims and other faithful who attend Mass on this day receive a plenary indulgence.

== Cardinal priests of San Crisogono ==
- Stephen (745–752), Priest elected Pope, but died before consecration
- Frederick of Lorraine (1057–1057), appointed 14 June, elected pope 2 August.
- Bernard degli Uberti (1097-1111?), Bishop of Parma
- Gregorius (c. 1111–1113)
- Theodericus (c. 1113–1116)
- Giovanni da Crema (c. 1117—before 1137)
- Berardo dei Marsi (1130–1136), Bishop of Avezzano
- Bernardo (1136–1138), Priest
- Guido Bellagi (1138–1158), Priest
- Ardicio Rivoltella (1158–1165), Priest
- Pietro (1173–1180), Meaux
- Bonadies de Bonadie (1186–1186), Priest
- Stephen Langton (1205–1228), Archbishop of Canterbury
- Robert Somercotes (1239–1241), Priest
- Raymond Le Roux (January 1325 – November 1325), Protonotarius Apostolico
- Pierre Cyriac (20 September 1342 – 1351), Priest
- Guy de Boulogne (1351–1373), Archbishop of Lyon
- Corrado Caraccioli (12 June 1405 – 15 February 1411), Bishop of Mileto
- Antão Martins de Chavez (8 July 1440 – 6 July 1447), Bishop of Porto
- Antonio Cerdà i Lloscos (17 February 1448 – 12 September 1459), Archbishop of Modena
- Giacomo Ammannati-Piccolomini (8 January 1462 – 17 August 1477), Bishop of Pavia
- Girolamo Basso della Rovere (17 September 1479 – 31 August 1492), Bishop of Renacati
- Giovanni Battista Ferrari (5 January 1500 – 20 July 1502), Bishop of Modena
- Adriano di Castello (12 June 1503 – 5 July 1518), Bishop of Hereford
- Albrecht von Brandenburg (5 July 1518 – 5 January 1521), Bishop of Mainz
- Eberhard von Der Mark (5 January 1521 – 27 February 1538), Archbishop of Valencia
- Girolamo Aleandro (20 March 1538 – 1 February 1542), Archbishop of Brindisi-Oria
- Pietro Bembo (15 February 1542 – 17 October 1544), Bishop of Bergamo
- Uberto Gambara (17 October 1544 – 14 February 1549), Bishop of Tortona
- Jean du Bellay (25 February 1549 – 28 February 1550), Archbishop of Bourdeaux
- Antoine Sanguin de Meudon (28 February 1550 – 25 November 1559), Bishop of Limoges
- Cristoforo Madruzzo (16 January 1560 – 13 March 1560), Bishop of Brixen
- Jean Bertrand (13 March 1560 – 4 December 1560), Archbishop of Sens
- Charles de Bourbon (15 January 1561 – 9 May 1590), Archbishop of Rouen
- Domenico Pinelli (14 January 1591 – 22 April 1602), Bishop of Fermo
- Camillo Borghese (22 April 1602 – 16 May 1605), Bishop of Montalcino
- Carlo Conti) (1 June 1605 – 17 August 1605), Bishop of Ancona e Umana
- Scipione Caffarelli-Borghese (17 August 1605 – 2 October 1633), Archbishop of Bologna
- Pietro Maria Borghese (19 December 1633 – 15 June 1642), Priest
- Fausto Poli (31 August 1643 – 7 October 1653), Bishop of Orvieto
- Lorenzo Imperiali (23 March 1654 – 21 September 1673), Priest
- Giovanni Battista Spada (24 September 1673 – 23 January 1675), Camerlengo of the Sacred College of Cardinals
- Carlo Pio di Savoia (28 January 1675 – 1 December 1681), Camerlengo of the Sacred College of Cardinals
- Paluzzo Paluzzi Altieri degli Albertoni (1 December 1681 – 13 November 1684), Prefect of the Sacred Congregation for the Faith
- Giulio Spinola (13 November 1684 – 28 February 1689), Bishop of Lucca
- Fabrizio Spada (23 May 1689 – 30 April 1708), elevated to Cardinal-Priest of Santa Prassede
- Filippo Antonio Gualterio (30 April 1708 – 29 January 1724), elevated to Cardinal Priest of Santa Cecilia in Trastevere
- Prospero Marefoschi (29 January 1725 – 19 November 1725), elevated to Cardinal Priest of San Callisto
- Giulio Alberoni (20 September 1728 – 29 August 1740), elevated to Cardinal Priest of San Lorenzo in Lucina
- Sigismund von Kollonitsch (29 August 1740 – 12 April 1751)
- Giovanni Giacomo Millo (10 December 1753 – 16 November 1757)
- Giovanni Battista Rovero (2 August 1758 – 9 October 1766)
- Filippo Maria Pirelli (1 December 1766 – 10 January 1771)
- Francesco Maria Banditi (18 December 1775 – 27 January 1796)
- Vincenzo Pecci (22 December 1853 – 20 February 1878), elected pope Leo XIII
- Friedrich Egon von Fürstenberg (27 February 1880 – 20 August 1892)
- Philipp Krementz (19 January 1893 – 6 May 1899)
- Francesco di Paola Cassetta (22 June 1899 – 27 March 1905), elevated to Cardinal Bishop of Sabina
- Pietro Maffi (18 April 1907 – 17 March 1931)
- Theodor Innitzer (13 March 1933 – 9 October 1955)
- Antonio María Barbieri (15 December 1958 – 6 July 1979)
- Bernard Yago (2 February 1983 – 5 October 1997)
- Paul Shan Kuo-hsi (21 February 1998 – 22 August 2012)
- Andrew Yeom Soo-jung (2 February 2014 – present)

== Gallery ==
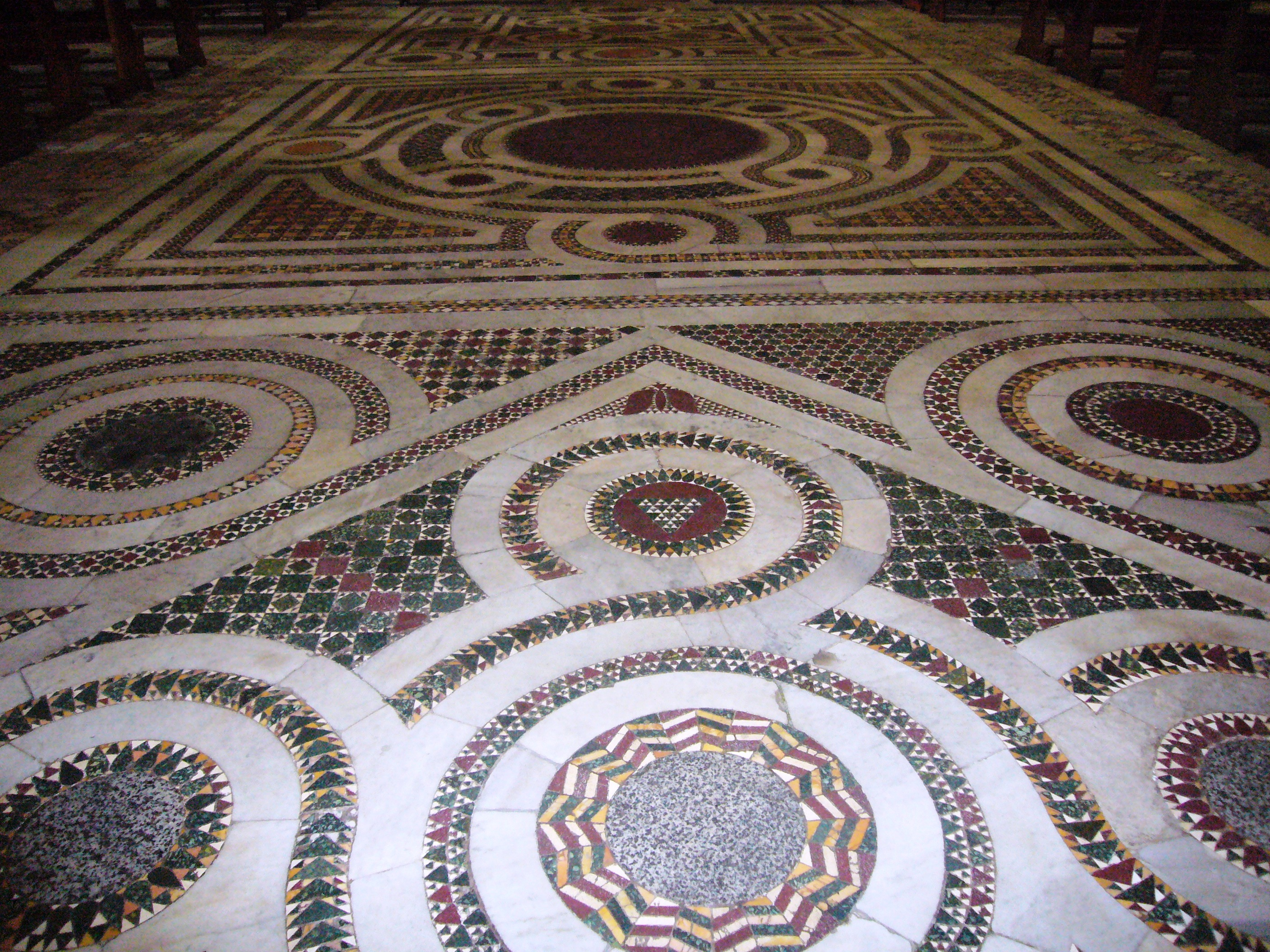
Cosmatesque pavement

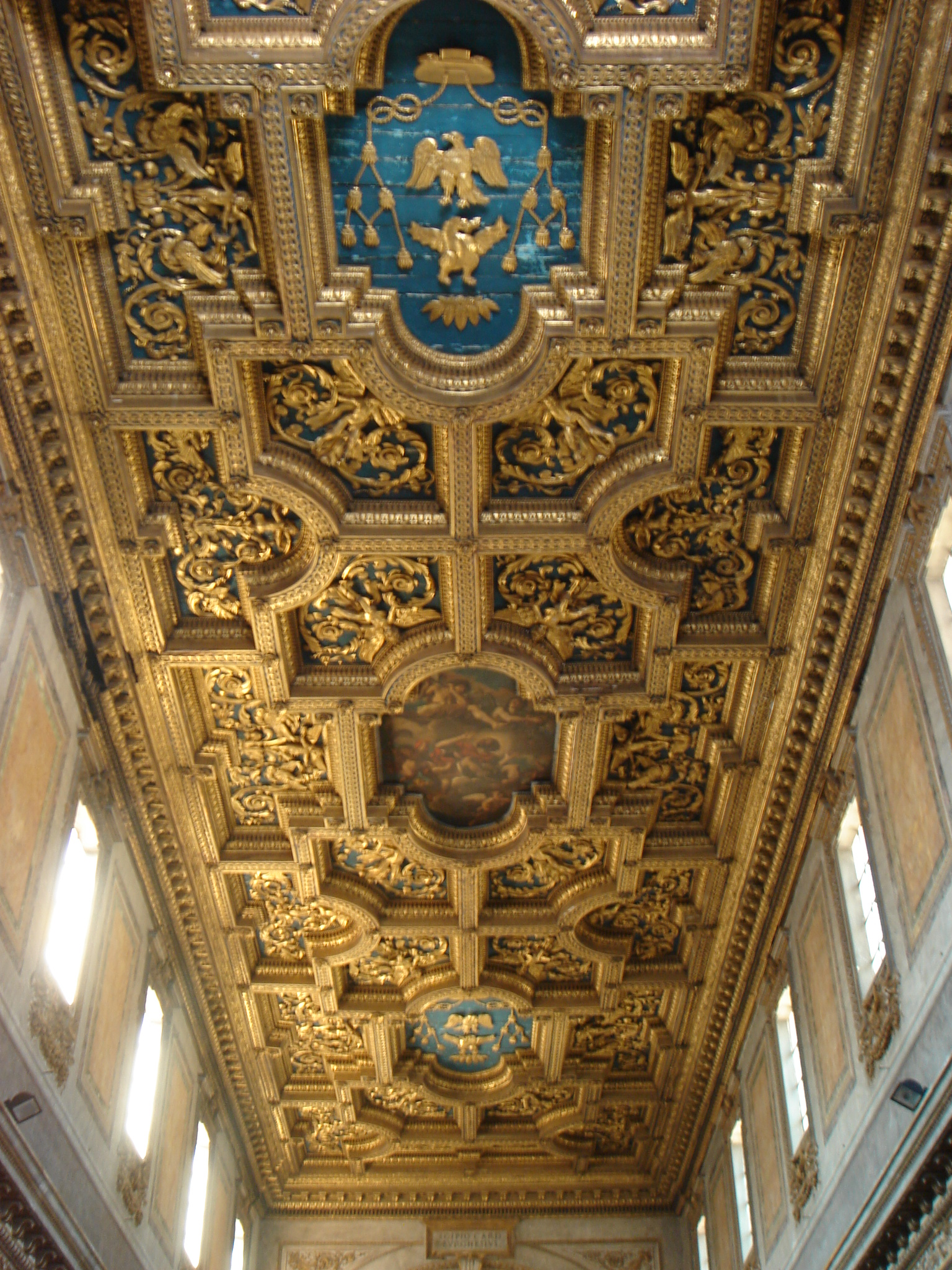
Coffered ceiling with coats of arms of Cardinal Scipione Borghese

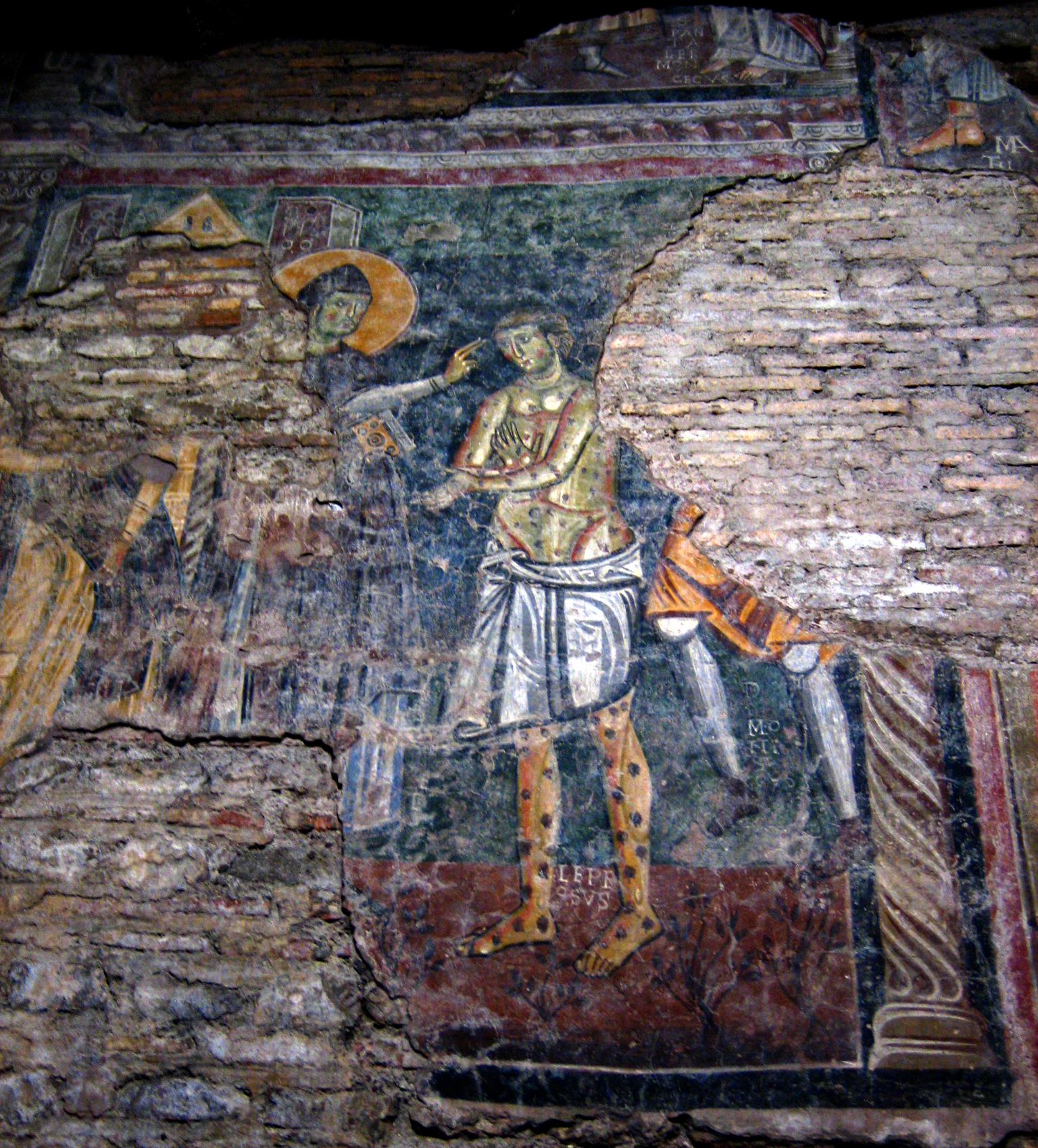
Eleventh-century fresco of a leper being healed by Saint Benedict of Nursia. The text "Leprosus" appears between the leper's ankles.

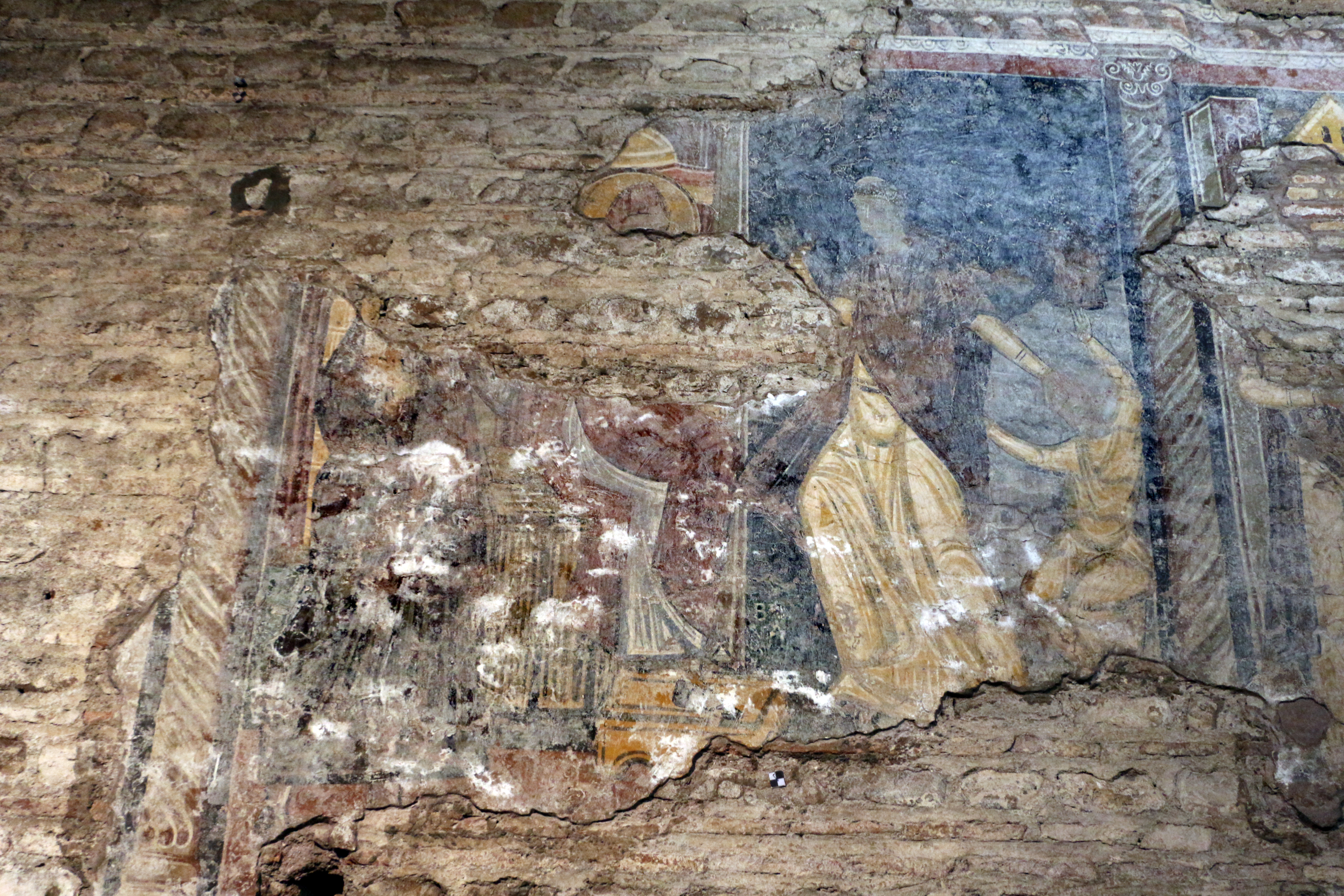
Stories of Sts. Benedict and Sylvester, 11th century

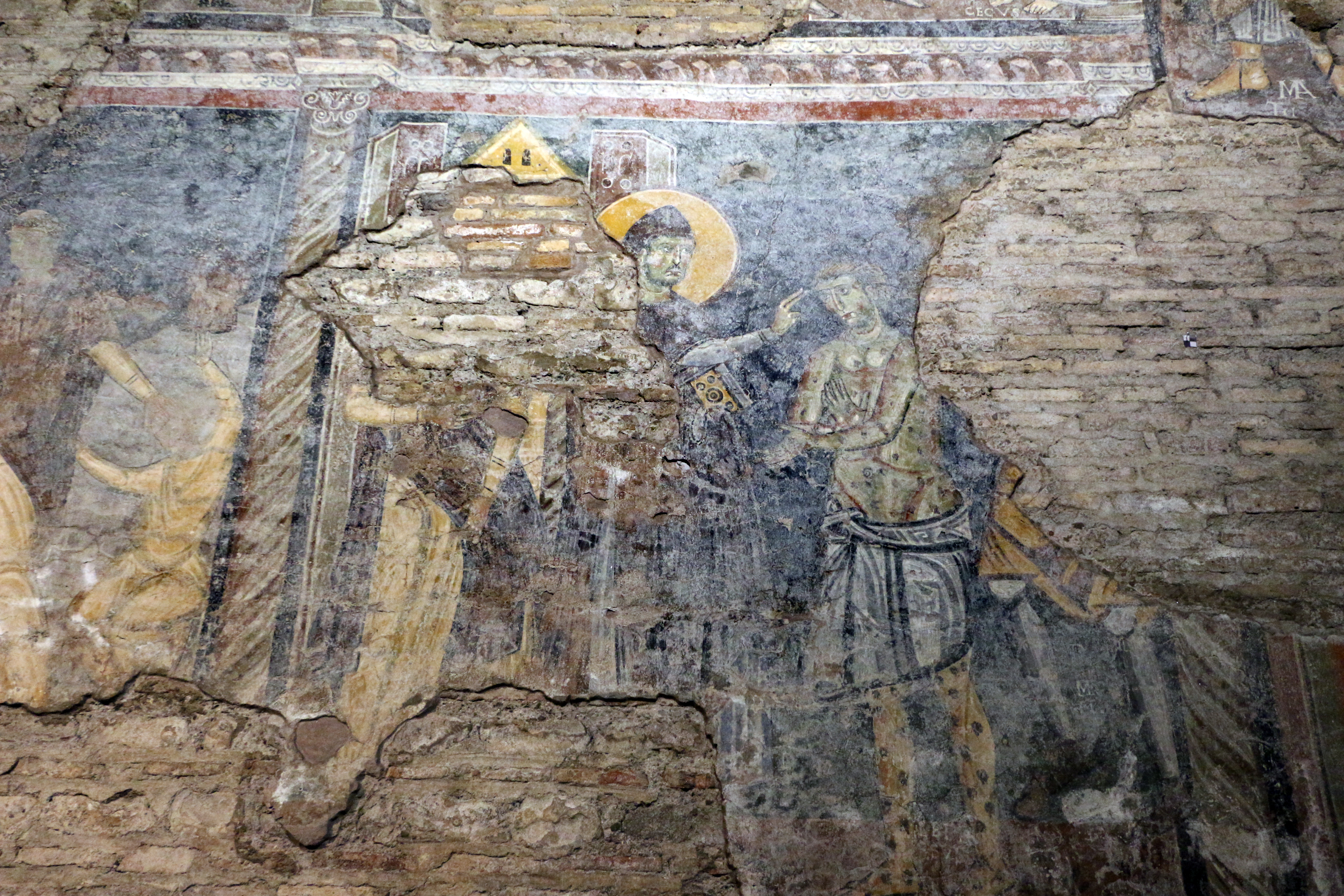
Stories of Sts. Benedict and Sylvester, 11th century

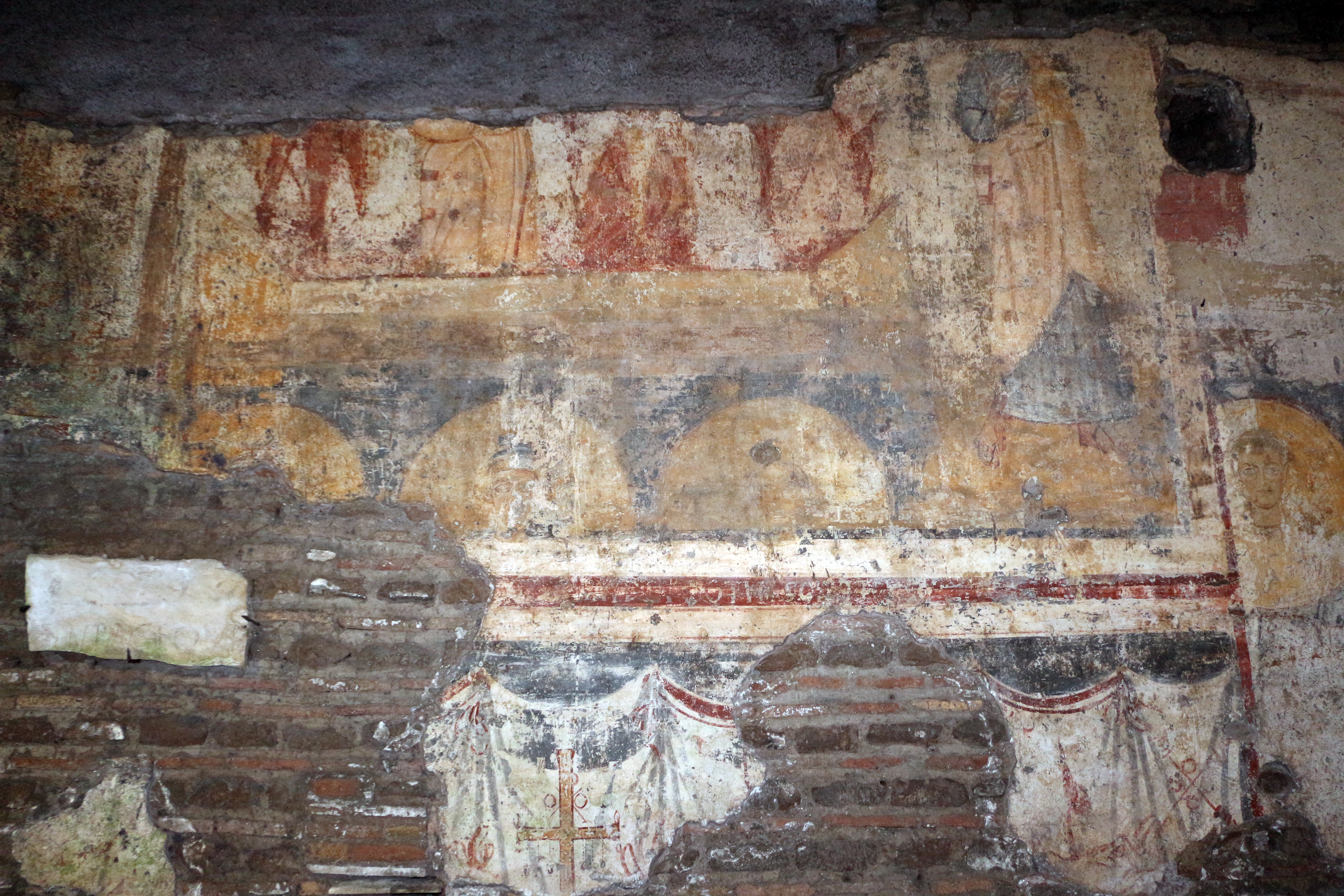
Frescoes with saints of the 8th and 10th centuries

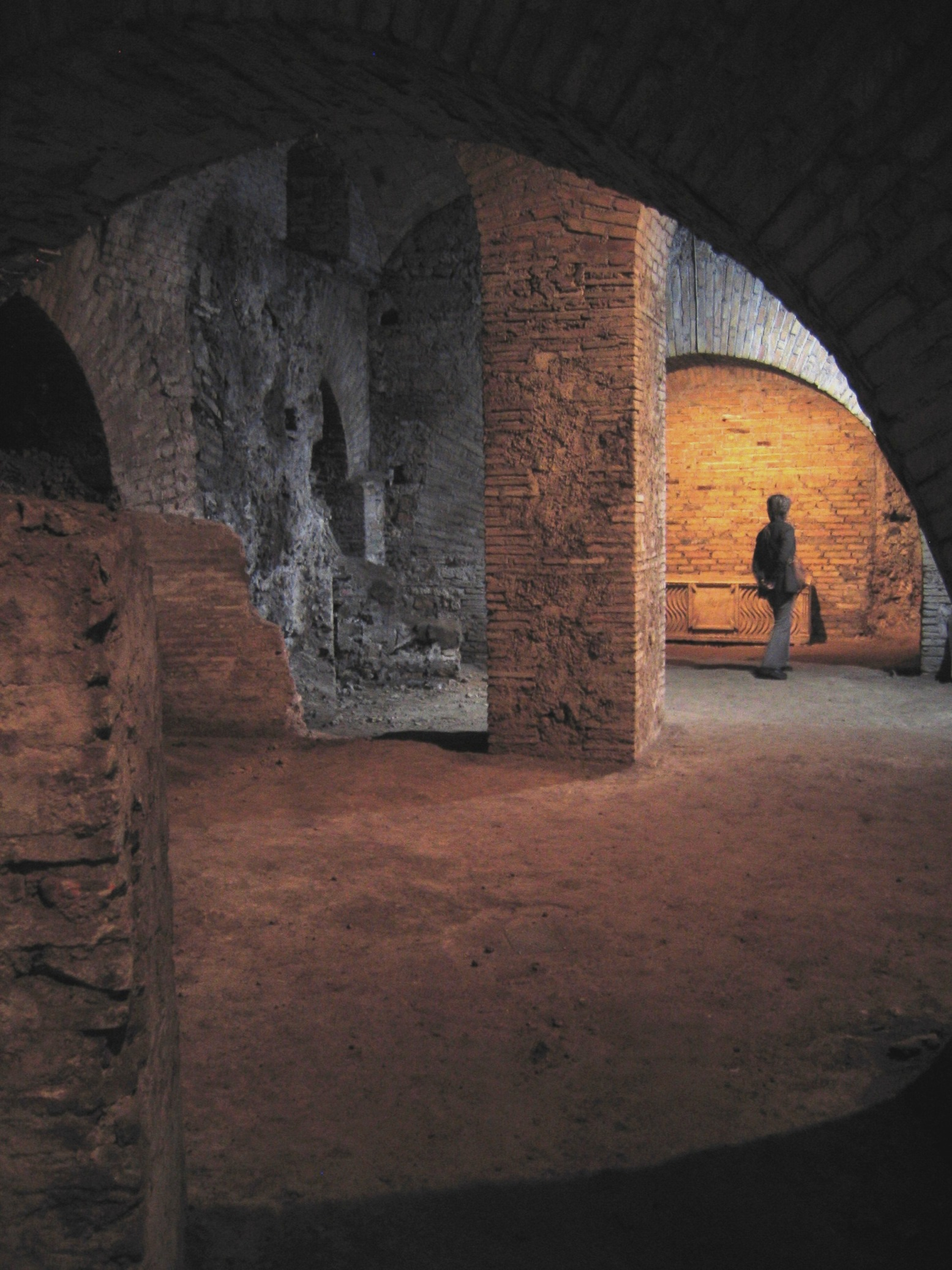
The crypt

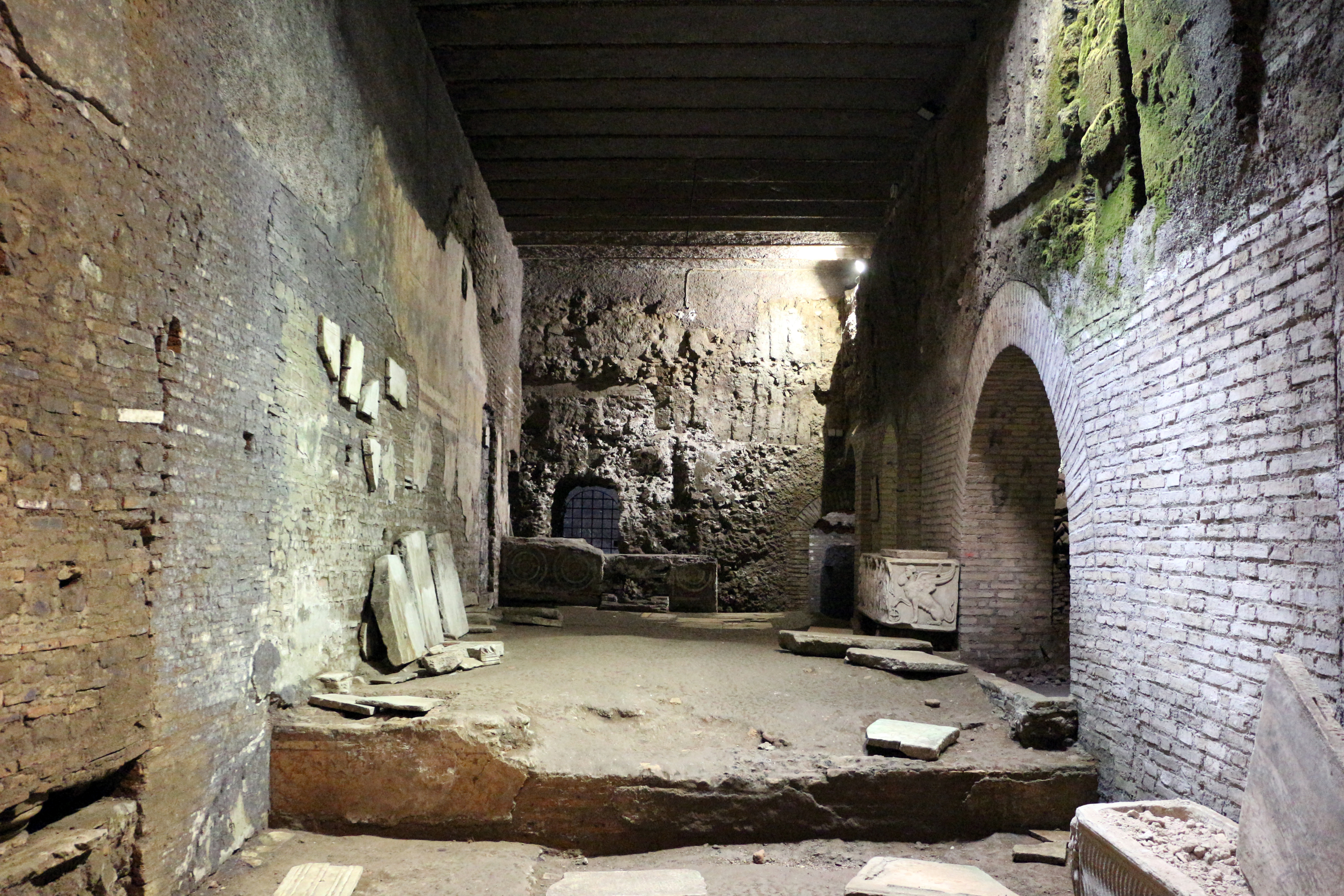
The crypt

== Bibliography ==
- Apollonj-Ghetti, Bruno Maria (1966). S. Crisogono. Le chiese di Roma illustrate, 92. (Roma, 1966). (in Italian)
- Cigola, Michela, "La basilica di s. Crisogono in Roma. Un rilievo critico", numero monografico del Bollettino del Centro di Studi per la Storia dell'Architettura, n. 35, Roma, dicembre 1989. (in Italian)
- Cigola M., "La basilica paleocristiana di san Crisogono," Archeologia XXV, numero 6/7, giugno luglio 1986, pp. 14–15. (in Italian)
- Cigola M., "La basilica di san Crisogono in Roma," Alma Roma XXV, numero 5–6, settembre-dicembre 1984, pp. 45–57. (in Italian)

Preceded by Santi Cosma e Damiano	Landmarks of Rome; San Crisogono, Rome	Succeeded by Santa Croce in Via Flaminia
