= Francesco Ferrari (bishop) =

Roman Catholic prelate

Most Reverend Francesco Ferrari
- Bishop of Modena
- Church: Catholic Church
- Diocese: Diocese of Modena
- In office: 1502–1507
- Predecessor: Giovanni Battista Ferrari (cardinal)
- Successor: Ippolito d'Este

Personal details
- Died: 1507 Modena, Italy

Francesco Ferrari (died 1507) was a Roman Catholic prelate who served as Bishop of Modena (1502–1507).

On 20 July 1502, Francesco Ferrari was appointed during the papacy of Pope Alexander VI as Bishop of Modena. He served as Bishop of Modena until his death in 1507.

== External links and additional sources ==
- Cheney, David M. "Archdiocese of Modena-Nonantola". Catholic-Hierarchy.org. (for Chronology of Bishops) ^{[self-published]}
- Chow, Gabriel. "Metropolitan Archdiocese of Modena–Nonantola (Italy)". GCatholic.org. (for Chronology of Bishops) ^{[self-published]}

Catholic Church titles
Preceded by Giovanni Battista Ferrari (cardinal)	Bishop of Modena; 1502–1507	Succeeded by Ippolito d'Este
