= Adriano Castellesi =

16th-century Bishop of Hereford, Bishop of Bath and Wells, and cardinal

- Cardinal Priest of S. Crisogono
- In office: 1503–1521
- Predecessor: Giovanni Battista Ferrari
- Successor: Albrecht von Brandenburg
- Other posts: Bishop of Hereford (1502–1504); Secretary to Pope Alexander VI (1503); Bishop of Bath and Wells (1504–1518)

Orders
- Created cardinal: 31 May 1503 by Alexander VI

Personal details
- Born: c. 1460 Corneto, Lazio, Papal States
- Died: c. 1521 (aged roughly 61 years)
- Denomination: Catholic

Adriano Castellesi (c. 1461-c. 1521), also known as Adriano de Castello or Hadrian de Castello, was an Italian cardinal, an English agent in Rome, and a writer. He was born in Corneto, which is today's Tarquinia. He was the child of a modest family.

== Biography ==
In 1488, Castellesi began a career in papal bureaucracy. After 1489, he would spend most of his diplomatic career in England as the papal collector, which allowed him to generate significant profits. By 1490 Castellesi formed a relationship with King Henry VII, followed by a series of accomplishments. In 1492 he received the prebend of Ealdland in St Paul's Cathedral followed by St Dunstan-in-the-East from King Henry. After Castellesi was granted English denization on 29 June 1492, he became the clerk of the papal treasury and the Bishop of Hereford. In August 1504, Castellesi was appointed to the more lucrative diocese of Bath and Wells, but he never resided in either.

Castellesi worked together with Silvestro Gigli in the matters of England, but Gigli soon became his bitter rival, with growing open hostility. They were admitted to the Confraternity of the English Hospice together. In 1500, both gained the right to use the name of the king's name with the Pope to defend the Christendom against the Turks. They later worked together to get the Pope's confirmation of the treaties between England and Scotland.Thomas Wolsey was another figure with whom Castellesi formed an increasingly strained relationship. Even though Wolsey turned to Castellesi to support his efforts at gaining a cardinalship, he later preferred Gigli. By 1515, Castellesi completely fell from Wolsey's favor.

In Rome, Castellesi formed a strong relationship with Pope Alexander VI. Even though Castellesi tried to buy a cardinalate in 1498, his efforts were unsuccessful until Alexander VI made him a cardinal, titled of San Grisogono, on 31 May 1503. He also succeeded Francesco Piccolomini as Cardinal Protector of Germany.

Castellesi bought a vigna in Borgo near the Vatican, where he built a sumptuous palace designed by Donato Bramante: it is now known as Palazzo Torlonia. In the summer of 1503 he entertained the Pope and Cesare Borgia. However, following this dinner all three of them fell ill, and the Pope died a week after. There is no evidence that suggests the Pope was poisoned. Once Pope Julius II succeeded Alexander VI, Castellesi's former good relationship with Alexander VI proved to be a liability, especially as the prominent representative of English interests in Rome.

Castellesi's cardinalship was revoked in 1518 when he was implicated in Alfonso Petrucci's failed attempt at Pope Leo X's assassination. Investigations following the assassination plot showed that Castellesi was indeed the Pope's enemy. His crime was announced as having heard Petrucci's hopes for Leo's death and remaining silent. Nevertheless, he was not executed, unlike some of the other plotters, due to his public confession. However, he was confined to his house and had to pay a fine of 12,500 scudi which was later doubled.

Following these events, Castellesi continued to face challenges, both in England and in Rome. Wolsey was infuriated that Castellesi could not secure him the bishopric of Tournai. Wolsey pressed for Castellesi's position as a collector and a cardinal to be revoked, which was eventually backed by King Henry. Despite Castellesi's struggle to hold on to power, King Henry repossessed Castellesi's palace. Later on, even though the Pope Leo X was inclined to consider clemency, Castellesi lost Bath and Wells as well as his cardinalship. The deprivation of his possessions and titles is primarily attributed to Wolsey's years-long personal vindictiveness against Castellesi. After these events, he retracted to Venice to remain in hiding. Once Pope Leo X died on 1 December 1521, Castellesi decided to leave Venice for Rome. Even though it is not precisely known how he died, it is believed that a servant murdered him in the following months of 1521.

== Works ==
As a writer, he was one of the first to restore the Latin tongue to its pristine purity. Among his works are:

- De Vera Philosophia ex quatuor doctoribus ecclesiae (Bologna, 1507) Digital. This is considered to be his most important work.
- De Sermone Latino & modis latine loquendi (Basel, 1513). The text is a treatise in guidance of writing Ciceronian Latin, with a dedication to King Henry VII. He may have begun drafting in 1507 in Bologna, around the same time he published De Vera. Once published De Sermone was a popular text.
- a poem, De Venatione (Venice, 1534), which was dedicated to Cardinal Ascanio Sforza in September 1505.

Catholic Church titles
| Preceded by Edmund Audley | Bishop of Hereford; 14 February 1502 – 2 August 1504 | Succeeded by Richard Mayew |
| Preceded by Giovanni Battista Ferrari | Cardinal Priest of S. Crisogono; 12 June 1503 – December 1521 | Succeeded by Albrecht von Brandenburg |
| Preceded by Oliver King | Bishop of Bath and Wells; 2 August 1504 – 5 July 1518 | Succeeded by Thomas Wolsey |
