= Juan Castellar y de Borja =

Spanish Roman Catholic bishop and cardinal

His Eminence Juan Castellar y de Borja
- Cardinal, Archbishop of Monreale
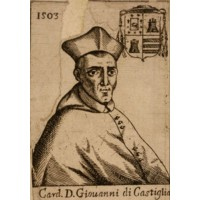
- Church: Catholic Church
- In office: 1493–1505
- Other post: Cardinal-Priest of Santa Maria in Trastevere (1503–1505)
- Previous post: Archbishop of Trani (1493–1503)

Orders
- Created cardinal: 31 May 1503 by Alexander VI

Personal details
- Born: December 1441 Valencia
- Died: 1 January 1505 (aged 63) Valencia

Juan Castellar y de Borja (1441–1505) (called the Cardinal of Trani and the Cardinal of Monreale) was a Spanish Roman Catholic bishop and cardinal.

== Biography ==
Juan Castellar y de Borja was born in Valencia in late 1441, the son of Galcerán de Castellar, señor de Picassent and Alcàsser, and his wife Bernardona Borja. The Castellar family was allied with the Borja family. He was a cousin of Cardinal Juan de Borja Lanzol de Romaní, el mayor.

Early in his career, he became a canon of the cathedral chapter of Seville Cathedral. He later also became a canon of Naples Cathedral, the Cathedral of Toledo, and Burgos Cathedral. Moving to Rome, he became a protonotary apostolic.

On 23 August 1493 he was elected Archbishop of Trani. In the same year, Pope Alexander VI named him governor of Perugia. On 17 February 1502 he was one of six cardinals and six prelates who accompanied the pope on his trip to Piombino.

Pope Alexander VI made Castellar a cardinal priest in the consistory of 31 May 1503. He received the titular church of Santa Maria in Trastevere on 12 June 1503.

On 9 August 1503 he was transferred to the metropolitan see of Monreale. He occupied the post until his death.

He participated in both the papal conclave of September 1503 that elected Pope Pius III and the papal conclave of October 1503 that elected Pope Julius II.

On 7 July 1504 he left Rome to visit Ferdinand II of Aragon. He became ill in Valencia, and after several months, died on 1 January 1505 of a kidney ailment. He was buried in the Augustinian convent in Valencia.

== See also ==
- Cardinals created by Alexander VI
