= Giovanni Battista Ferrari (cardinal) =

His Eminence Giovanni Battista Ferrari
- Archbishop of Capua
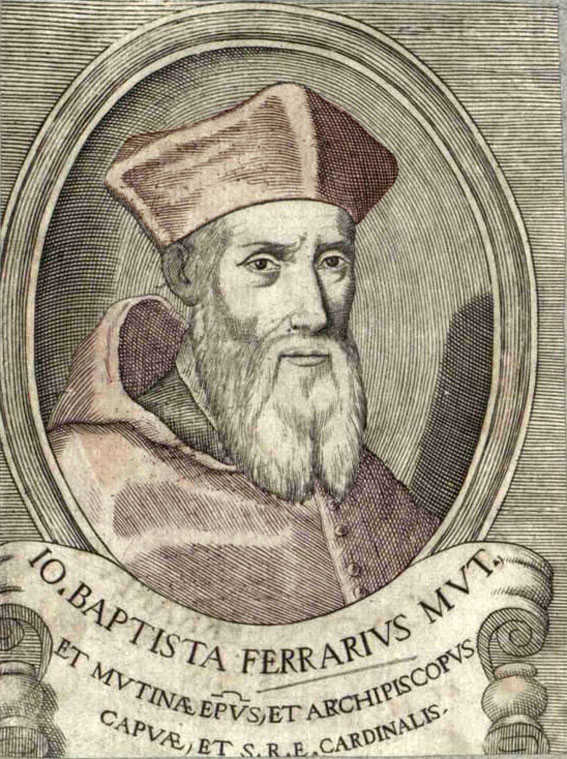
- Engraving of Cardinal Ferrari, 1500
- Church: Catholic Church
- Archdiocese: Capua
- Appointed: 9 August 1501
- Term ended: 20 July 1502
- Predecessor: Juan López
- Successor: Ippolito d'Este
- Other posts: Cardinal-Priest of San Crisogono (1661-1672)
- Previous posts: Bishop of Modena (1495-1501)

Orders
- Created cardinal: 28 September 1500 by Pope Alexander VI
- Rank: Cardinal-Priest

Personal details
- Born: 1450 Modena, Duchy of Modena and Reggio
- Died: 20 July 1502 (aged 51–52) Rome, Papal States

Giovanni Battista Ferrari (Modena, around 1450 – Rome, 20 July 1502) was an Italian Catholic Cardinal and Archbishop.

== Biography ==
Son of the notary Giovanni Ferrari and Verde Alberghetti, he dedicated himself from a very young age to an ecclesiastical career. After obtaining a doctorate in law at the University of Padua, he took up a position as Protonotary apostolic in Rome. Under the patronage of Cardinal Rodrigo de Borja, he was Abbreviator and secretary to King John II of Aragon.

His career was boosted by the rise to the Papacy of his mentor Cardinal Borja: in 1495 he was named Referendary and assistant to Cardinal Ascanio Sforza in the issuance of papal bulls. In that same year, he also became Bishop of Modena, succeeding the deceased Giovanni Andrea Boccacci, although he never resided in the see, governing it through vicars from Rome, first Giovanni de Viscatis and then Antonio Calori.

He was representative of Duke Ercole I d'Este in Rome, and regent of the Apostolic Chancery for a brief period, and played a prominent role in the marriage of Lucrezia Borgia to Alfonso I d'Este and in the organization of the Holy Year of 1500. In the Consistory of September 1500 he was created cardinal, receiving the title of San Crisogono, and in August 1501 he received the Archdiocese of Capua, vacant due to the death of Juan López, retaining the Bishopric of Modena.

=== Apostolic Dataria ===
However, it was his activity at the head of the Apostolic Dataria from 1496 onwards that made him famous: at a time when the Papal States were engaged in their struggle against the Ottoman Empire of Bayezid II and the Borgias were attempting to control Romagna in the Italian Wars of 1499–1504, Ferrari's ability to procure money for the coffers of the Holy See made him an indispensable figure in the politics of Alexander VI.

Although the methods he used to do so made him abhorrent among his contemporaries: the practice of Venal offices - although it was a practice inherited from the Middle Ages and accepted in his time - reached disproportionate dimensions during Ferrari's Dataria until it became an everyday custom, earning him a reputation as an implacable and greedy man, to the point that most of his contemporaries and historians who later dealt with his life pointed him out for his bad example.

=== Death ===
He died in Rome in 1502 at the age of 51 after several days of illness. According to most of his biographers, he was poisoned by his assistant Sebastiano Pinzoni, who is supposed to have acted at the instigation of Cesare Borgia or Pope Alexander VI, although some authors doubt this, attributing his death to fever. Immediately after his death, numerous satirical epigrams appeared in the city criticizing his greed.

His body was initially deposited in St. Peter's Basilica and shortly after transferred to Modena and buried in the cathedral of this city. His fortune, estimated at 80,000 gold ducats and various ecclesiastical benefits that brought in another 6,400 annually went to the coffers of the Holy See by virtue of a provision signed by Ferrari shortly before his death that contradicted his previous will in which he bequeathed his estate to his relatives.

Catholic Church titles
Preceded by Gian Andrea Bocciazzi	Bishop of Modena; 1495–1501	Succeeded by Francesco Ferrari
Preceded by Girolamo Basso della Rovere	Cardinal-Priest of San Crisogono; 1500–1502	Succeeded by Adriano Castellesi
Preceded by Juan López	Archbishop of Capua; 1501–1502	Succeeded by Ippolito d'Este
