= Juan de Borja Lanzol de Romaní, el menor =

Spanish Roman Catholic bishop and cardinal

Juan de Borja Lanzol de Romaní the Younger (Sp.: Juan de Borja Lanzol de Romaní, el menor) (1470–1500) (called the Cardinal of Santa Maria in Via Lata, the Cardinal of Valencia, or Cardinal Borgia) was a Spanish Roman Catholic bishop and cardinal.

== Biography ==
A member of the House of Borgia, Juan de Borja Lanzol de Romaní, el menor was born in Valencia in 1470, the son of Jofré de Borja Lanzol, ninth baron of Villalonga, and Juana de Moncada. He was the great-grand-nephew of Pope Callixtus III and the grand-nephew of Pope Alexander VI on his mother's side.

In 1481, he became a canon of the cathedral chapter of Valencia Cathedral. Pope Alexander VI made him governor of Spoleto in 1494. He was also a protonotary apostolic.

On September 19, 1494, he was elected Bishop of Melfi, a position he held until December 3, 1498, when he resigned the position. In 1495, he served as governor of Perugia and then as nuncio to Naples. In 1496, he was promoted to the metropolitan see of Capua, holding that position until he resigned on October 15, 1498.

Pope Alexander VI made him a cardinal deacon in the consistory of February 19, 1496. He received the red hat and the deaconry of Santa Maria in Via Lata on February 24, 1496.

The pope named him his vicar in Rome and the cardinal lived with the pope in the Apostolic Palace. On May 6, 1497, he accompanied the pope to Ostia. In the consistory of May 22, 1497, he was made papal legate to Perugia and Umbria. He returned to Rome on December 2, 1497, then left again for Perugia on June 13, 1498. In December 1498, he was despatched to Viterbo to pacify the rebellious city. On August 9, 1499, the pope named him legate a latere to the Republic of Venice, and the cardinal left on this legation on August 26. He became apostolic administrator of the metropolitan see of Valencia; on September 6, 1499; he held this post until his death, although he never visited the archdiocese in person. Following the departure of Cardinal Ascanio Sforza, he became papal legate to Bologna on October 11, 1499.

In January 1500, he was named a commander of papal troops, but was soon struck with a malignant fever. He was on his way to congratulate his cousin Cesare Borgia for his victory over Caterina Sforza at Forlì, when he died of malignant fever in Fossombrone on January 17, 1500. He is buried in Santa Maria del Popolo.

== See also ==
- Juan de Borja (disambiguation)
- Catholic Church in Spain
