= Melchior von Meckau =

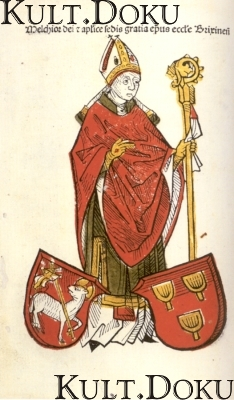
Melchior von Meckau

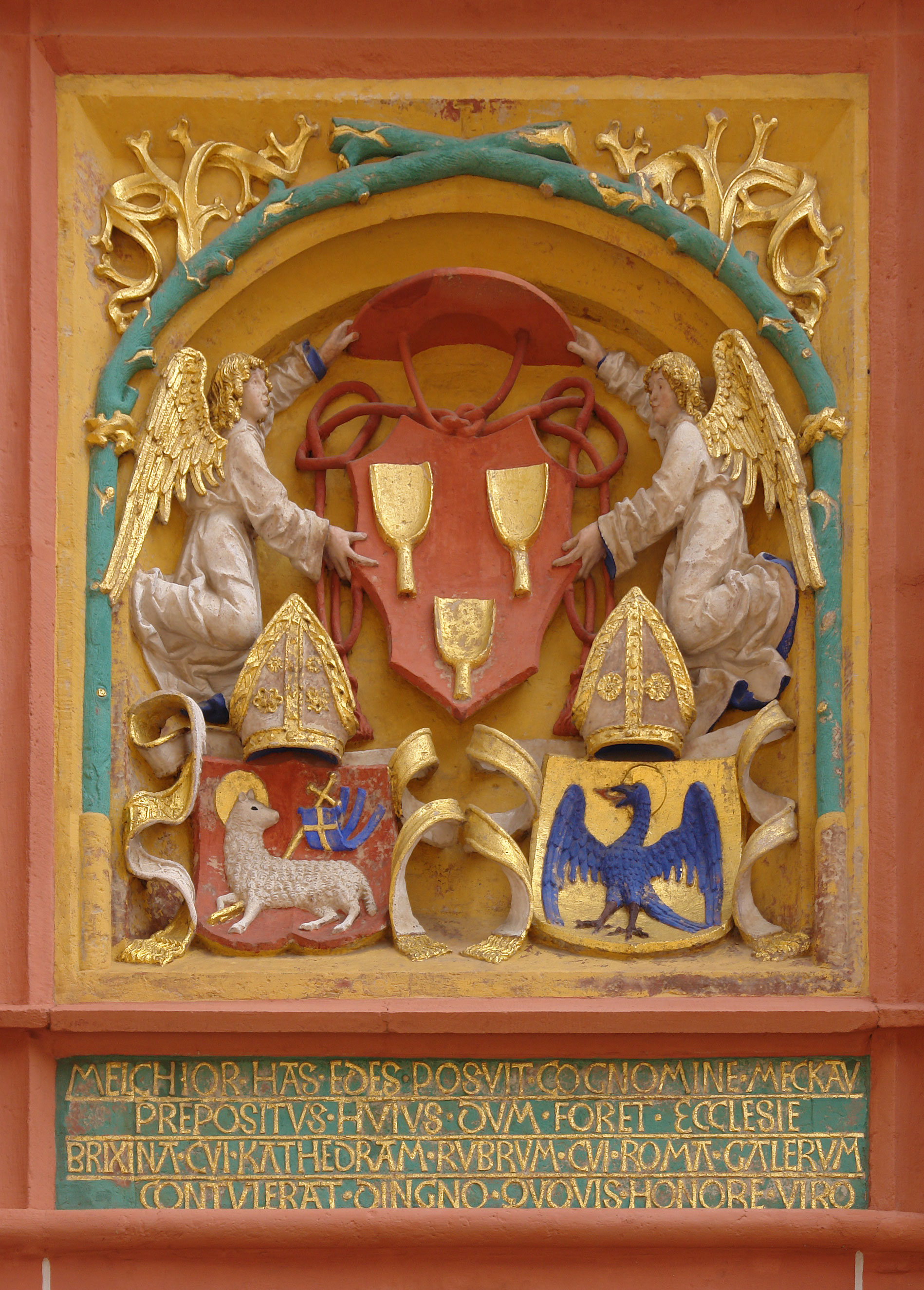
Coat of arms of Cardinal Melchior von Meckau

Melchior von Meckau (1440–1509) (called the Cardinal of Brixen) was a German Roman Catholic cardinal and bishop.

== Life and church ==
Melchior von Meckau was born in Meissen in 1440, the son of Gaspar von Meckau, who later became a counselor of Maximilian I, Holy Roman Emperor.

He began his studies at Leipzig in 1458, and then enrolled at the University of Bologna in 1459. He ultimately received a doctorate in law from the University of Bologna.

He became provost of the Cathedral of Magdeburg in 1470. He moved to Rome and became a secretary in the Chancery of Apostolic Briefs. In 1473, Pope Sixtus IV nominated him to be dean of the cathedral chapter of Meissen Cathedral. From 1473, he was also a counselor of Sigismund, Archduke of Austria, becoming his chancellor in 1481. He was also a canon of Brixen Cathedral.

On April 20, 1482, he was named coadjutor bishop of Georg Gosler, Prince-Bishop of Brixen. He spent most of his time with Archduke Sigismund in Innsbruck until 1488, when Bishop Gosler transferred administration of the prince-bishopric to him. When Bishop Gosler died on June 20, 1489, Bishop Meckau succeeded as Prince-Bishop of Brixen.

He celebrated a diocesan synod in November 1489, where the major topic of discussion was the Breviary and the Missal used in Brixen. In 1490, he became a canon of St. Lambert's Cathedral, Liège. Upon the death of Frederick III, Holy Roman Emperor, the new emperor, Maximilian I, left Bishop Meckau in charge of the territorial government of Tyrol. He was an active governor and supported the emperor financially during the Swabian War. Bishop Meckau was a patron of the arts, architecture and literature, and has been called the first humanist bishop of Brixen.

Pope Alexander VI made him a cardinal priest in the consistory of May 31, 1503. He received the titular church of San Nicola in Carcere on June 12, 1503.

He did not participate in the papal conclave of September 1503 that elected Pope Pius III, but he did participate in the papal conclave of October 1503 that elected Pope Julius II.

Emperor Maximilian named Cardinal Meckau as his ambassador to arrange for the diplomacy necessary for his coronation. Cardinal Meckau visited the pope in Rome on December 16, 1506 and then visited the Republic of Venice, which was forbidding passage through its territory.

On January 5, 1507, he opted for the titular church of Santo Stefano Rotondo.

Because of the intransigence of the Republic of Venice, Maximilian could not be crowned and traveled to Trent. (This was one of the grievances leading up to the War of the League of Cambrai.) In February 1507, Maximilian declared that he was Holy Roman Emperor even though he had not been crowned; Cardinal Meckau conveyed this decision to the pope, who gave his assent.

He died in Rome on March 3, 1509. He was buried in Santa Maria in Ara Coeli.
