= Juan de Borja Lanzol de Romaní, el mayor =

Cardinal

Juan de Borja Lanzol de Romaní
- Cardinal-Priest of Santa Susanna
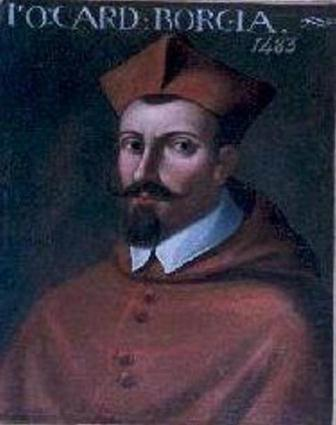
- Juan de Borja Lanzol (Llançol) de Romaní, el mayor
- Church: Catholic Church
- Archdiocese: Archdiocese of Monreale
- Diocese: Diocese of Ferrara
- See: Santa Susanna; Patriarchate of Constantinople
- In office: 31 August 1492 – 1 August 1503
- Predecessor: Lorenzo Cybo de Mari
- Successor: Francesco Soderini
- Other posts: Titular Patriarch of Constantinople (1503); Archbishop of Monreale (1483-1503); Bishop of Ferrara (1494-1503)
- Previous post: Administrator of Olomouc (1493-1497)

Orders
- Created cardinal: 31 August 1492 by Pope Alexander VI

Personal details
- Born: 1446 Valencia, Kingdom of Valencia, Crown of Aragon
- Died: 1 August 1503 (aged 56–57) Rome, Papal States

The coat of arms of Juan de Borja Lanzol (Llançol) de Romaní, el mayor

Juan de Borja Lanzol (Llançol) de Romaní, el mayor (1446 – August 1, 1503) was the first of ten cardinal-nephews elevated by Pope Alexander VI, the cousin of his father, Galcerán de Borja y Moncada.

== Biography ==
Borja was the son of Galcerán de Borja y Moncada and Tecla Navarro de Alpicat, born in 1446. He was a canon of the cathedral chapter of Valencia and the paborde of Albal as well as a minor cleric.

Pope Sixtus IV, also a relative, made Borja protonotary apostolic and an editor of apostolic letters circa 1408. Pope Innocent VIII made him the Governor of Rome. Borja had an illegitimate son named Galcerán.

He was elected archbishop of Monreale on September 13, 1483, an archdiocese he would never visit but occupy until his death. There is no evidence he was ever ordained a priest or consecrated as bishop. After the papal conclave, 1492, which elected Borja's relative Rodrigo pope as Alexander VI, he was created cardinal-priest of S. Susanna on August 31, 1492.

Borja went on to accumulate benefices and their associated revenues: he became the administrator of the see of Olomouc, Moravia from February 8, 1493, to January 30, 1497. He was named legate a latere to Alfonso II of Naples on April 18, 1494. Borja was named bishop of Ferrara on October 29, 1494, taking possession of the see on June 14, 1497, until his death. He was also the bishop of Melfi from September 19, 1494, until December 3, 1498.

In May 1494, he attended the coronation of Alfonso II of Naples, along with one patriarch, seven archbishops, and forty bishops; Borja himself crowned Alfronso king on May 18. Along with Cesare Borgia and Alexander VI, Juan met with Alfonso on July 12, 1494, in Vicovaro to co-ordinate military strategy against Cardinal Ascanio Sforza (whom Borja would later replace in the office of the Vice-Chancellor in 1500) and his allies as well as Charles VIII of France. He brought Alexander VI's terms of peace to Charles VIII on December 25, 1494, in Bracciano before retreating with the pontiff on January 7, 1495, to the Castel Sant'Angelo (and then on May 27, 1495, to Orvieto) to take refuge from French troops. On April 24, 1503, Borja became the titular Latin Patriarch of Constantinople.

== In popular culture ==
Juan de Borja is a target in 2010 video game Assassin's Creed: Brotherhood.

== See also ==
- Juan de Borja (disambiguation)
