= Luigi Caetani =

Italian Cardinal (1595–1642)

Coordinates: 41°53′54.3″N 12°29′44″E

His Eminence Luigi Caetani
- Cardinal-Priest of Santa Pudenziana; Archbishop Emeritus of Capua
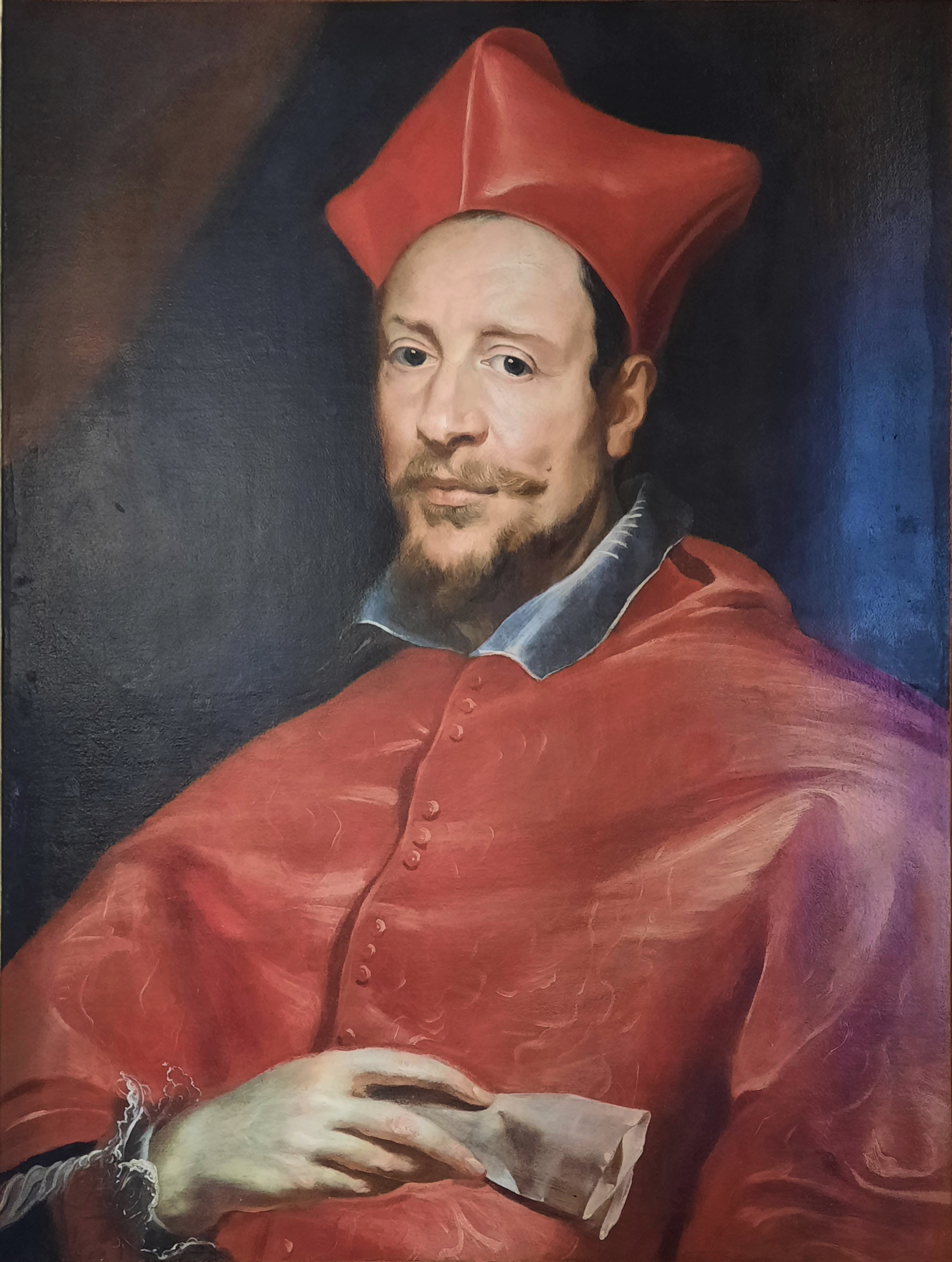
- Luigi Caetani, cardinal
- Archdiocese: Archdiocese of Capua
- In office: 17 March 1624 - 1 March 1627
- Predecessor: Antonio Caetani (iuniore)
- Successor: Girolamo Costanzo
- Other posts: Titular Patriarch of Antioch; Cardinal-Priest of Santa Pudenziana
- Previous posts: Commendatory abbot of San Leonardo di Siponto (1608); Coadjutor Archbishop of Capua (1622-1624); President of the Congregation for the Reform of the Breviary (1631-1642)

Orders
- Consecration: 12 June 1622 by Ludovico Ludovisi
- Created cardinal: 19 January 1626 by Pope Urban VIII
- Rank: Cardinal-Priest

Personal details
- Born: July 1595 Piedimonte, Campania, Kingdom of Naples
- Died: 15 April 1642 (aged 46) Rome, Latium, Papal State
- Buried: Basilica of Santa Pudenziana
- Denomination: Roman Catholic
- Education: doctorate in law
- Coat of arms

Styles of Luigi Caetani
- Reference style: His Eminence
- Spoken style: Your Eminence
- Informal style: Cardinal
- See: Basilica of Santa Pudenziana

Luigi Caetani (July 1595 – 15 April 1642) was an Italian Cardinal of the Roman Catholic Church.

== Biography ==
Luigi Caetani was born in Piedimonte, the son of Filippo I Caetani, duke of Sermoneta, and Camilla Gaetani dell'Aquila d'Aragona, of the dukes of Traetto. Descendant of the family of Pope Boniface VIII, great-grand-nephew of Cardinal Niccolò Caetani, grand-nephew of Cardinal Enrico Caetani and nephew of Cardinals Bonifazio Caetani and Antonio Caetani (seniore), he studied first in Ravenna, where his uncle Bonifazio was legate, and then in Rome, where he obtained a doctorate in law.

He served as Archbishop of Capua from 17 March 1624 until his resignation on 1 March 1627. He was ordained a bishop on 12 June 1622 and appointed the coadjutor archbishop of Capua on 14 November 1622. Caetani was elevated to cardinal on 19 January 1626 and installed as the cardinal-priest of S. Pudenziana on 9 February 1626.

Cardinal Caetani was consecrated to the episcopacy by Ludovico Ludovisi. Having himself consecrated Ulderico Carpegna, Caetani is in the episcopal lineage of Pope Francis, Pope Benedict XVI and Pope Leo XIV.

== Episcopal succession ==
Episcopal succession of Luigi Caetani

While bishop, he was the principal consecrator of:

- Juan de Guevara, Bishop of Teano (1627)
- Angelo Cesi, Bishop of Rimini (1627)
- Alessandro Bichi, Bishop of Isola (1628)
- Alessandro Castracani, Bishop of Nicastro (1629)
- Consalvo Caputo, Bishop of San Marco (1630)
- Orazio Annibale della Molara, Bishop of Manfredonia (1630)
- Ulderico Carpegna, Bishop of Gubbio (1630)
- Giovanni Battista Scanaroli, Titular Bishop of Sidon (1630)
- Tegrimus Tegrimi, Bishop of Assisi (1630)
- Giorgio Bolognetti, Bishop of Ascoli Satriano (1630)
- Scipione Pannocchieschi d'Elci, Bishop of Pienza (1631)
- Giovanni Thomas Marnavich, Bishop of Bosnia (1631)
- Pompeo Balbani, Bishop of Castro del Lazio (1632)
- Girolamo Martini, Bishop of Ugento (1637);

and the principal co-consecrator of:

- Alfonso Manzanedo de Quiñones, Titular Patriarch of Jerusalem (1622)

Catholic Church titles
Preceded by Tomás Dávalos de Aragón	Titular Patriarch of Antioch; 1622	Succeeded by Giovanni Battista Pamphilj
Preceded by Antonio Caetani (iuniore)	Archbishop of Capua; 1624-1627	Succeeded by Girolamo Costanzo
Preceded by Antonio Caetani (iuniore)	Cardinal-Priest of Santa Pudenziana; 1626–1642	Succeeded by Alderano Cybo
Preceded by Antonio Marcello Barberini	Camerlengo of the Sacred College of Cardinals; 1637–1638	Succeeded by Bernardino Spada
