= Pietro Francesco Montorio =

Roman Catholic prelate

Most Reverend Pietro Francesco Montorio
- Bishop Emeritus of Nicastro
- Church: Catholic Church
- Diocese: Diocese of Nicastro
- In office: 1594–1620
- Predecessor: Clemente Bontodasio
- Successor: Ferdinando Confalone
- Previous post: Apostolic Nuncio to Germany (1621–1624)

Orders
- Consecration: 24 Feb 1594 by Giovanni Battista Castrucci

Personal details
- Born: 1556 Rome, Italy
- Died: 6 Jun 1643 (age 87)

Ordination history of Pietro Francesco Montorio
History
Episcopal consecration
- Principal consecrator: Giovanni Battista Castrucci
- Co-consecrators: Angelo Cesi, and Lorenzo Celsi
Episcopal succession
Bishops consecrated by Pietro Francesco Montorio as principal consecrator
- Giovan Battista Curiale (Correale): 18 July 1632

Pietro Francesco Montorio (1556–1643) was a Roman Catholic prelate who served as Apostolic Nuncio to Germany (1621–1624) and Bishop of Nicastro (1594–1620).

== Biography ==
Pietro Francesco Montorio was born in Rome, Italy in 1556. On 7 Feb 1594, he was appointed during the papacy of Pope Clement VIII as Bishop of Nicastro. On 24 Feb 1594, he was consecrated bishop by Giovanni Battista Castrucci, Archbishop Emeritus of Chieti, with Angelo Cesi, Bishop of Todi, and Lorenzo Celsi, Bishop of Castro del Lazio, serving as co-consecrators. In 1620, he resigned as Bishop of Nicastro. On 4 Aug 1621, he was appointed during the papacy of Pope Gregory XV as Apostolic Nuncio to Germany. He served as Apostolic Nuncio to Germany until his resignation on 15 Jun 1624. He died on 6 Jun 1643.

== Episcopal succession ==
While bishop, he was the principal consecrator of:

- Giovan Battista Curiale, Bishop of Nicastro (1632);

and the principal co-consecrator of:

- Gerolamo Mezzamico, Bishop of Trevico (1608);
- Bartolomeo Cesi (cardinal), Archbishop of Conza (1608);
- Cesare Ventimiglia, Bishop of Terracina, Priverno e Sezze (1615);
- Giovanni Battista Lancellotti, Bishop of Nola (1615);
- Alessandro Del Monte, Bishop of Gubbio (1616);
- Miguel Angel Zaragoza Heredia, Bishop of Teano (1617);
- Augustin Potier, Bishop of Beauvais (1617);
- Juan de Guevara, Bishop of Teano (1627);
- Carlo Emmanuele Pio di Savoia, Bishop of Albano (1627);
- Angelo Cesi, Bishop of Rimini (1627);
- Giuseppe Candido, Bishop of Lipari (1628); and
- Alessandro Castracani, Bishop of Nicastro (1629).

== External links and additional sources ==
- Cheney, David M. "Diocese of Lamezia Terme". Catholic-Hierarchy.org. (for Chronology of Bishops) ^{[self-published]}
- Chow, Gabriel. "Diocese of Lamezia Terme (Italy)". GCatholic.org. (for Chronology of Bishops) ^{[self-published]}

Catholic Church titles
Preceded by Clemente Bontodasio	Bishop of Nicastro; 1594–1620	Succeeded by Ferdinando Confalone
Preceded by Antonio Albergati	Apostolic Nuncio to Germany; 1621–1624	Succeeded by Pier Luigi Carafa
