= Gazzosa al caffè =

Soft drink from Calabria, Italy

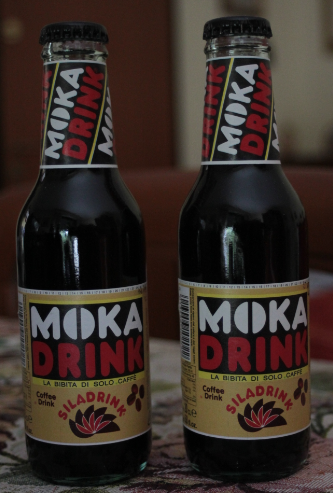
Two bottles of gazzosa al caffè (MokaDrink brand)

The gazzosa al caffè is a typical Calabrese soft drink, combining carbonated water and coffee.

== History ==
The first coffee soda was distributed, with the name of "Bibicaffè", by the company "De Sarro & Torchia" of Nicastro (now part of Lamezia Terme) in 1941. Nowadays the most widespread brands are Brasilena from Girifalco and MokaDrink from Cosenza.

== Diffusion ==
Today gazzosa al caffè is exported all over the world, mainly to the United States.

== See also ==
- Coffea
