= Lorenzo Celsi (bishop) =

Roman Catholic prelate

Most Reverend Lorenzo Celsi
- Bishop of Castro del Lazio
- Church: Catholic Church
- Diocese: Diocese of Castro del Lazio
- In office: 1591–1603
- Predecessor: Celso Paci
- Successor: Giovanni Ambrogio Caccia

Orders
- Consecration: 10 August 1591 by Ludovico de Torres

Personal details
- Died: 1603 Castro del Lazio, Italy

Lorenzo Celsi (died 1603) was a Roman Catholic prelate who served as Bishop of Castro del Lazio (1591–1603).

== Biography ==
On 19 July 1591, Lorenzo Celsi was appointed during the papacy of Pope Gregory XIV as Bishop of Castro del Lazio. On 10 August 1591, he was consecrated bishop by Ludovico de Torres, Archbishop of Monreale, with Agapito Bellomo, Bishop of Caserta, and Gaspare Cenci, Bishop Emeritus of Melfi e Rapolla, serving as co-consecrators. He served as Bishop of Castro del Lazio until his death in 1603.

== Episcopal succession ==
While bishop, he was the principal co-consecrator of:

- Juan Pedro González de Mendoza, Bishop of Lipari (1593);
- Pietro Francesco Montorio, Bishop of Nicastro (1594); and
- Alessandro Guidiccioni (iuniore), Bishop of Lucca (1600).

== See also ==
- Catholic Church in Italy

Catholic Church titles
Preceded by Celso Paci	Bishop of Castro del Lazio; 1591–1603	Succeeded by Giovanni Ambrogio Caccia
