= Baldassarre Giustiniani =

Italian Roman Catholic prelate

Most Reverend Baldassarre Giustiniani
- Bishop of Venosa
- Church: Catholic Church
- Diocese: Diocese of Venosa
- In office: 1572–1584
- Predecessor: Giovanni Antonio Locatelli
- Successor: Giovanni Tommaso Sanfelice

Orders
- Consecration: 13 April 1572 by Archangelo de' Bianchi

Personal details
- Died: 13 March 1584 Venosa, Italy

Baldassarre Giustiniani (died 13 March 1584) was a Roman Catholic prelate who served as Bishop of Venosa (1572–1584).

== Biography ==
On 6 February 1572, Baldassarre Giustiniani was appointed during the papacy of Pope Pius V as Bishop of Venosa. On 13 April 1572, he was consecrated bishop by Archangelo de' Bianchi, Bishop of Teano, with Bartolomeo Ferro, Bishop of Terni, and Vincenzo Ercolano, Bishop of Sarno, serving as co-consecrators. He served as Bishop of Venosa until his death on 13 March 1584.

== External links and additional sources ==
- Cheney, David M. "Diocese of Venosa". Catholic-Hierarchy.org. (for Chronology of Bishops) ^{[self-published]}
- Chow, Gabriel. "Diocese of Venosa". GCatholic.org. (for Chronology of Bishops) ^{[self-published]}

Catholic Church titles
Preceded by Giovanni Antonio Locatelli	Bishop of Venosa; 1572-1584	Succeeded by Giovanni Tommaso Sanfelice
