= Domenico Ravenna =

Most Reverend Domenico Ravenna
- Bishop of Nicastro
- Church: Catholic Church
- Diocese: Diocese of Nicastro
- In office: 1635–1637
- Predecessor: Giovan Battista Curiale
- Successor: Marco Antonio Mandosio

Orders
- Consecration: 18 February 1635 by Francesco Maria Brancaccio

Personal details
- Born: 1584 Rome, Italy
- Died: 1637 (age 53) Nicastro, Italy

Domenico Ravenna (1584 – 1637) was a Roman Catholic prelate who served as Bishop of Nicastro (1635–1637).

== Biography ==
Domenico Ravenna was born in Rome in 1584 and ordained a priest in November 1634. On 12 February 1635, he was appointed during the papacy of Pope Urban VIII as Bishop of Nicastro. On 18 February 1635, he was consecrated bishop by Francesco Maria Brancaccio, Cardinal-Priest of Santi XII Apostoli, with Carlo Carafa, Bishop of Aversa, and Pier Luigi Carafa, Bishop of Tricarico, with serving as co-consecrators. He served as Bishop of Nicastro until his death in July 1637. While bishop, he was the principal co-consecrator of Orazio Muscettola, Bishop of Trevico (1636); and Maurizio Ragano, Bishop of Fondi (1636).

== External links and additional sources ==
- Cheney, David M. "Diocese of Lamezia Terme". Catholic-Hierarchy.org. (for Chronology of Bishops) ^{[self-published]}
- Chow, Gabriel. "Diocese of Lamezia Terme (Italy)". GCatholic.org. (for Chronology of Bishops) ^{[self-published]}

Catholic Church titles
Preceded by Giovan Battista Curiale	Bishop of Nicastro; 1635–1637	Succeeded by Marco Antonio Mandosio
