= Marco Antonio Mandosio =

17th-century Italian Catholic bishop

Most Reverend Marco Antonio Mandosio
- Bishop of Nicastro
- Church: Catholic Church
- Diocese: Diocese of Nicastro
- In office: 1637–1638
- Predecessor: Domenico Ravenna
- Successor: Giovanni Tommaso Perrone

Orders
- Consecration: 21 September 1637 by Alessandro Cesarini (iuniore)

Personal details
- Born: 1606 Rome, Italy
- Died: August 1638 (age 32) Nicastro, Italy

Marco Antonio Mandosio or Marco Antonio Mondosio (1606–1638) was a Roman Catholic prelate who served as Bishop of Nicastro (1637–1638).

== Biography ==
Marco Antonio Mandosio was born in Rome, Italy in 1606. On 7 September 1637, he was appointed during the papacy of Pope Urban VIII as Bishop of Nicastro. On 21 September 1637, he was consecrated bishop by Alessandro Cesarini (iuniore), Cardinal-Deacon of Santa Maria in Cosmedin, with Alfonso Gonzaga, Titular Archbishop of Rhodus, and Giovanni Battista Scanaroli, Titular Bishop of Sidon, serving as co-consecrators. He served as Bishop of Nicastro until his death in August 1638.

== External links and additional sources ==
- Cheney, David M. "Diocese of Lamezia Terme". Catholic-Hierarchy.org. (for Chronology of Bishops) ^{[self-published]}
- Chow, Gabriel. "Diocese of Lamezia Terme (Italy)". GCatholic.org. (for Chronology of Bishops) ^{[self-published]}

Catholic Church titles
Preceded by Domenico Ravenna	Bishop of Nicastro; 1637–1638	Succeeded by Giovanni Tommaso Perrone
