= Antonio Caetani =

Antonio Caetani may refer to:

- Antonio Caetani (iuniore) (1566–1624), Italian Roman Catholic cardinal
- Antonio Caetani (seniore) (1360–1412), Italian Roman Catholic cardinal
