= Pompeo Balbani =

Most Reverend Pompeo Balbani
- Bishop of Castro del Lazio
- Church: Catholic Church
- Diocese: Diocese of Castro del Lazio
- In office: 1632–1639
- Predecessor: Alessandro Carissimi
- Successor: Alberto Giunti

Orders
- Consecration: 25 January 1632 by Luigi Caetani

Personal details
- Died: 1639 Castro del Lazio, Italy

Pompeo Balbani (died 1639) was a Roman Catholic prelate who served as Bishop of Castro del Lazio (1632–1639).

== Biography ==
On 19 January 1632, Pompeo Balbani was appointed during the papacy of Pope Urban VIII as Bishop of Castro del Lazio. On 25 January 1632, he was consecrated bishop by Luigi Caetani, Cardinal-Priest of Santa Pudenziana. He served as Bishop of Castro del Lazio until his death in 1639.

Catholic Church titles
Preceded by Alessandro Carissimi	Bishop of Castro del Lazio; 1632–1639	Succeeded by Alberto Giunti
