= Juan de Guevara =

Ordination history of Juan de Guevara
History
Episcopal consecration
- Principal consecrator: Luigi Caetani
- Co-consecrators: Antonio Santacroce and Pietro Francesco Montorio

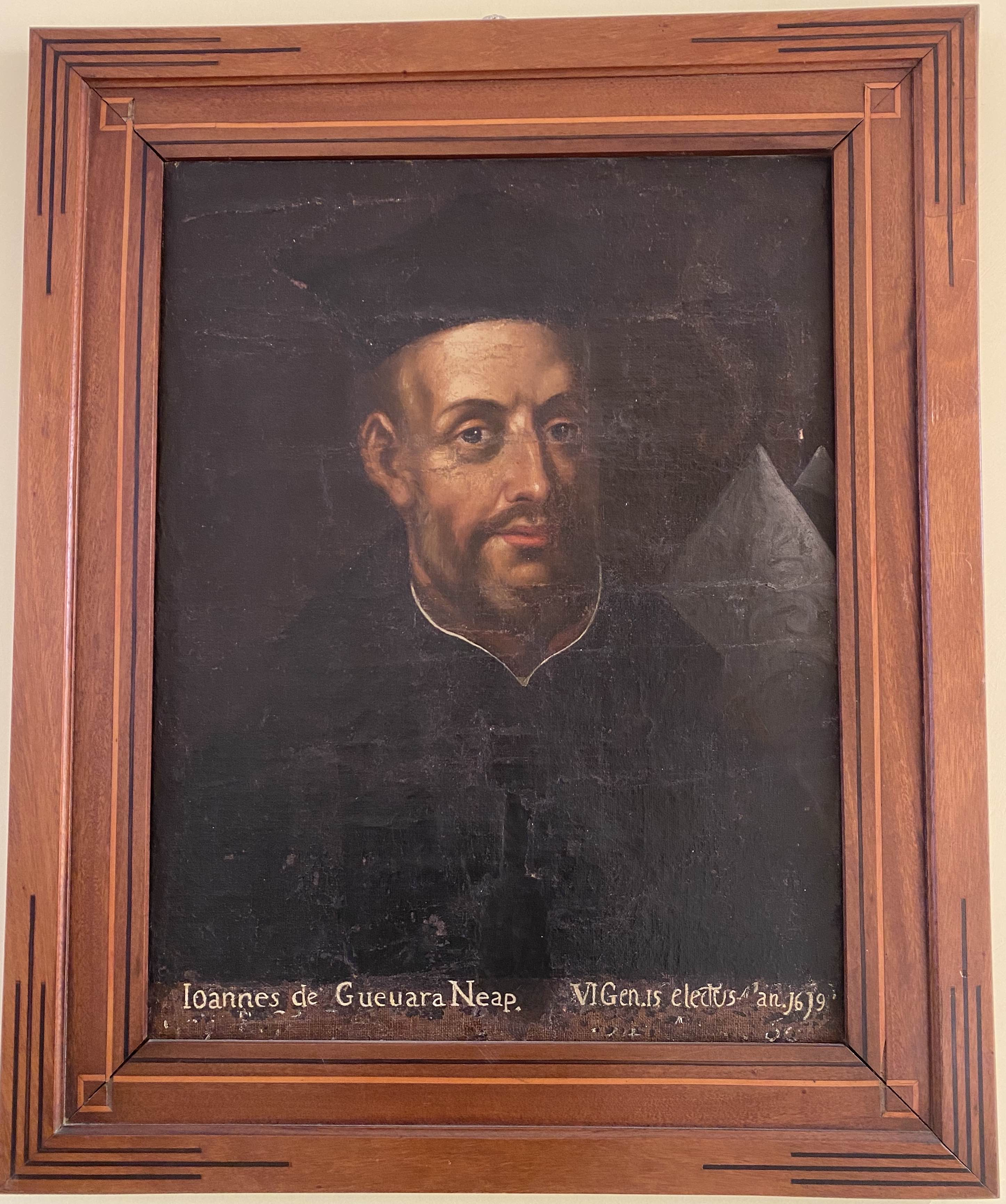
Painted portrait of Giovanni Guevara (Juan de Guevara) at the Generalate of the Order of Clerics Regular Minor (CRM) in Rome, Italy, during his term as General Superior of the Order in 1619-1627.

Juan de Guevara or Giovanni Guevara (died August 1641) was a Roman Catholic prelate who served as Bishop of Teano (1627–1641).

== Biography ==
Juan de Guevara was a professed religious of the Order of Clerics Regular Minor who was elected Superior General of the Order from 1619 to 1627.

On 22 March 1627, he was appointed during the papacy of Pope Urban VIII as Bishop of Teano. On 11 April 1627, he was consecrated bishop by Luigi Caetani, Cardinal-Priest of Santa Pudenziana, with Antonio Santacroce, Titular Archbishop of Seleucia in Isauria, and Pietro Francesco Montorio, Bishop Emeritus of Nicastro, serving as co-consecrators. He served as Bishop of Teano until his death on August 1641.

== External links and additional sources ==
- Cheney, David M. "Diocese of Teano". Catholic-Hierarchy.org. (for Chronology of Bishops) ^{[self-published]}
- Chow, Gabriel. "Diocese of Teano–Calvi (Italy)". GCatholic.org. (for Chronology of Bishops) ^{[self-published]}

Catholic Church titles
Preceded by Ovidio Lupari	Bishop of Teano; 1627–1641	Succeeded by Muzio de Rosis
