= Giuseppe Candido =

Roman Catholic prelate

Most Reverend Giuseppe Candido
- Bishop of Lipari
- Church: Catholic Church
- Diocese: Diocese of Lipari
- In office: 1627–1644
- Predecessor: Alberto Caccano
- Successor: Agostino Candido

Orders
- Ordination: August 1627
- Consecration: 2 January 1628 by Federico Baldissera Bartolomeo Cornaro

Personal details
- Born: 1591 Syracuse, Italy
- Died: 9 December 1644 (age 53) Lipari, Italy

Giuseppe Candido (1591 – 9 December 1644) was a Roman Catholic prelate who served as Bishop of Lipari (1627–1644).

== Biography ==
Giuseppe Candido was born in Syracuse, Italy in 1591 and ordained a priest in August 1627. On 29 November 1627, he was appointed during the papacy of Pope Urban VIII as Bishop of Lipari. On 2 January 1628, he was consecrated bishop by Federico Baldissera Bartolomeo Cornaro, Bishop of Vicenza, with Pietro Francesco Montorio, Bishop Emeritus of Nicastro, and Antonio Ricciulli, Bishop of Belcastro, serving as co-consecrators. He served as Bishop of Lipari until his death on 9 December 1644.

== External links and additional sources ==
- Cheney, David M. "Diocese of Lipari". Catholic-Hierarchy.org. (for Chronology of Bishops) ^{[self-published]}
- Chow, Gabriel. "Diocese of Lipari (Italy)". GCatholic.org. (for Chronology of Bishops) ^{[self-published]}

Catholic Church titles
Preceded by Alberto Caccano	Bishop of Lipari; 1627–1644	Succeeded by Agostino Candido
