= Giovanni Battista Castrucci =

Roman Catholic cardinal

His Eminence Giovanni Battista Castrucci
- Cardinal-Priest of Santi Giovanni e Paolo
- Church: Roman Catholic Church
- Appointed: 14 Feb 1592
- Term ended: 18 Aug 1595
- Previous posts: Cardinal-Priest of Santa Maria in Ara Coeli (1586-1592); Archbishop of Chieti (1585-1595)

Orders
- Created cardinal: 18 Dec 1585 by Sixtus V
- Rank: Cardinal-Priest

Personal details
- Born: 1541 Lucca
- Died: 18 Aug 1595 (aged 54) Lucca

Giovanni Battista Castrucci (1541–1595) was a Roman Catholic cardinal.

== Episcopal succession ==
Episcopal succession of Giovanni Battista Castruccio

While bishop, he was the principal consecrator of:

- Lelio Morelli, Bishop of Capaccio (1586);
- Antonio Maria Gallo, Bishop of Perugia (1586);
- Antonio Grimani (patriarch), Bishop of Torcello (1587); and
- Pietro Francesco Montorio, Bishop of Nicastro (1594).

Catholic Church titles
Preceded by Cesare Busdrago	Archbishop of Chieti; 1585–1591	Succeeded by Orazio Sanminiato
Preceded by Alessandro Riario	Cardinal-Priest of Santa Maria in Ara Coeli; 1586–1592	Succeeded by Francesco Maria Bourbon Del Monte Santa Maria
Preceded by Alessandro Ottaviano de' Medici	Cardinal-Priest of Santi Giovanni e Paolo; 1592–1595	Succeeded by Agostino Cusani
