= Bisenzio =

Bisenzio may refer to:

- the Italian name of Ancient Visentium (also spelled Bisentium), already an Etruscan city
  - the first name (and see?) of the former Roman Catholic Diocese of Castro del Lazio (also known as Castrum in Tuscia, or just Castro)
- Bisenzio (river), a Tuscan tributary of the Arno
- Bisenzio, a frazione of Lavenone, Lombardy, Italy
