= Giovanni Tommaso Perrone =

Roman Catholic bishop

Most Reverend Giovanni Tommaso Perrone
- Bishop of Nicastro
- Church: Catholic Church
- Diocese: Diocese of Nicastro
- In office: 1639–1677
- Predecessor: Marco Antonio Mandosio
- Successor: Francesco Tansi

Orders
- Consecration: 25 April 1639 by Alessandro Cesarini (iuniore)

Personal details
- Died: 16 November 1677 (age 76) Nicastro, Italy

Giovanni Tommaso Perrone (1601 – 16 November 1677) was a Roman Catholic prelate who served as Bishop of Nicastro (1639–1677).

== Biography ==
Giovanni Tommaso Perrone was born in Rossano, Italy in 1601. On 11 April 1639, he was appointed during the papacy of Pope Urban VIII as Bishop of Nicastro. On 25 April 1639, he was consecrated bishop by Alessandro Cesarini (iuniore), Cardinal-Deacon of Sant'Eustachio, with Tommaso Carafa, Bishop Emeritus of Vulturara e Montecorvino, and Lorenzo della Robbia, Bishop of Fiesole, serving as co-consecrators. He served as Bishop of Nicastro until his death on 16 November 1677.

== External links and additional sources ==
- Cheney, David M. "Diocese of Lamezia Terme". Catholic-Hierarchy.org. (for Chronology of Bishops) ^{[self-published]}
- Chow, Gabriel. "Diocese of Lamezia Terme (Italy)". GCatholic.org. (for Chronology of Bishops) ^{[self-published]}

Catholic Church titles
Preceded by Marco Antonio Mandosio	Bishop of Nicastro; 1639–1677	Succeeded by Francesco Tansi
