= Giovan Battista Curiale =

17th-century Catholic bishop

Most Reverend Giovan Battista Curiale
- Bishop of Nicastro
- Church: Catholic Church
- Diocese: Diocese of Nicastro
- In office: 1632–1634
- Predecessor: Alessandro Castracani
- Successor: Domenico Ravenna

Orders
- Consecration: 18 July 1632 by Pietro Francesco Montorio

Personal details
- Died: 1634 Nicastro, Italy

Ordination history of Giovan Battista Curiale
History
Episcopal consecration
- Principal consecrator: Pietro Francesco Montorio
- Co-consecrators: Luca Cellesi, and Francesco Maria Brancaccio

Giovan Battista Curiale or Giovan Battista Correale (died 1634) was a Roman Catholic prelate who served as Bishop of Nicastro (1632–1634).

== Biography ==
On 5 July 1632, Giovan Battista Curiale was appointed during the papacy of Pope Urban VIII as Bishop of Nicastro. On 18 July 1632, he was consecrated bishop by Pietro Francesco Montorio, Bishop Emeritus of Nicastro, with Luca Cellesi, Bishop of Martirano, and Francesco Maria Brancaccio, Bishop of Capaccio, with serving as co-consecrators. He served as Bishop of Nicastro until his death in 1634.

== External links and additional sources ==
- Cheney, David M. "Diocese of Lamezia Terme". Catholic-Hierarchy.org. (for Chronology of Bishops) ^{[self-published]}
- Chow, Gabriel. "Diocese of Lamezia Terme (Italy)". GCatholic.org. (for Chronology of Bishops) ^{[self-published]}

Catholic Church titles
Preceded by Alessandro Castracani	Bishop of Nicastro; 1632–1634	Succeeded by Domenico Ravenna
