= Giovanni Paolo Marincola =

Italian Roman Catholic prelate

Most Reverend Giovanni Paolo Marincola
- Bishop of Teano
- Church: Catholic Church
- Diocese: Diocese of Teano
- In office: 1575–1588
- Predecessor: Archangelo de' Bianchi
- Successor: Vincenzo Brancaleoni

Orders
- Ordination: by Giulio Antonio Santorio
- Consecration: 4 March 1576

Personal details
- Died: 1588 Teano, Italy

Giovanni Paolo Marincola (died 1588) was a Roman Catholic prelate who served as Bishop of Teano (1575–1588).

== Biography ==
On 18 September 1575, Giovanni Paolo Marincola was appointed by Pope Gregory XIII as Bishop of Teano. On 4 March 1576, he was ordained a bishop by Giulio Antonio Santorio, Cardinal-Priest of San Bartolomeo all’Isola, with Giovanni Antonio Facchinetti de Nuce, Bishop Emeritus of Nicastro, and Giovanni Placido, Bishop of Sessa Aurunca, serving as co-consecrators. He served as Bishop of Teano until his death in 1588.

While bishop, he was the principal consecrator of Sasbout Vosmeer, Vicar Apostolic to the Dutch Mission and Titular Bishop of Philippi (1602).

== External links and additional sources ==
- Cheney, David M. "Diocese of Teano". Catholic-Hierarchy.org. (for Chronology of Bishops) ^{[self-published]}
- Chow, Gabriel. "Diocese of Teano–Calvi (Italy)". GCatholic.org. (for Chronology of Bishops) ^{[self-published]}

Catholic Church titles
Preceded by Archangelo de' Bianchi	Bishop of Teano; 1575–1588	Succeeded by Vincenzo Brancaleoni
