= Italian Voice =

Italian-American newspaper

The Italian Voice (La Voce Italiana) is an ethnic Italian-American newspaper published in Paterson, New Jersey. It was founded by Mary Augusto, an immigrant from Italy who was the first woman to run for mayor of Paterson, and began publication in 1932.

Augusto was born in 1901 in Nicastro, Calabria, Italy.
