= Nicola Regitano =

Most Reverend Nicola Regitano
- Bishop of Nicastro
- Church: Catholic Church
- Diocese: Diocese of Nicastro
- In office: 1533
- Predecessor: Giovanni Pietro Ricci
- Successor: Paolo Capizucchi

Personal details
- Died: Sep 1533 Nicastro, Italy

Nicola Regitano (died 1533) was a Roman Catholic prelate who served as Bishop of Nicastro (1533).

== Biography ==
On 3 Mar 1533, Nicola Regitano was appointed during the papacy of Pope Clement VII as Bishop of Nicastro. He served as Bishop of Nicastro until his death in Sep 1533.

== External links and additional sources ==
- Cheney, David M. "Diocese of Lamezia Terme". Catholic-Hierarchy.org. (for Chronology of Bishops) ^{[self-published]}
- Chow, Gabriel. "Diocese of Lamezia Terme (Italy)". GCatholic.org. (for Chronology of Bishops) ^{[self-published]}

Catholic Church titles
Preceded by Giovanni Pietro Ricci	Bishop of Nicastro; 1533	Succeeded by Paolo Capizucchi
