= Girolamo Michele Nichesola =

Bishop of Teano, Italy from 1535 to 1556

Most Reverend Girolamo Michele Nichesola
- Bishop of Teano
- Church: Catholic Church
- Diocese: Diocese of Teano
- In office: 1535–1556
- Predecessor: Antonio Maria Sartori
- Successor: Archangelo de' Bianchi

Personal details
- Died: August 1566 Teano, Italy

Girolamo Michele Nichesola (died August 1566) was a Roman Catholic prelate who served as Bishop of Teano (1535–1556).

== Biography ==
Girolamo Michele Nichesola was ordained a priest in the Order of Preachers. On 11 January 1557, he was appointed by Pope Paul IV as Bishop of Teano. He served as Bishop of Teano until his death in August 1566.

== External links and additional sources ==
- Cheney, David M. "Diocese of Teano". Catholic-Hierarchy.org. (for Chronology of Bishops) ^{[self-published]}
- Chow, Gabriel. "Diocese of Teano–Calvi (Italy)". GCatholic.org. (for Chronology of Bishops) ^{[self-published]}

Catholic Church titles
| Preceded by Antonio Maria Sartori | Bishop of Teano; 1535–1556 | Succeeded by Archangelo de' Bianchi |
