= Vincenzo Serafino =

Most Reverend Vincenzo Serafino
- Bishop of Teano
- Church: Catholic Church
- In office: 1588–1615
- Predecessor: Vincenzo Brancaleoni
- Successor: Angelo della Ciaja

Orders
- Consecration: 7 December 1588 by Girolamo Bernerio

Personal details
- Died: 1615 Ascoli Piceno, Italy

Vincenzo Serafino (died 1615) was a Roman Catholic prelate who served as Bishop of Teano (1588–1615).

== Biography ==
On 3 October 1588, Vincenzo Serafino was appointed during the papacy of Pope Gregory XIII as Bishop of Teano. On 7 December 1588, he was consecrated bishop by Girolamo Bernerio, Bishop of Ascoli Piceno, with Fabio Biondi (bishop), Titular Patriarch of Jerusalem, and Giambattista de Benedictis, Bishop of Penne e Atri, serving as co-consecrators. He served as Bishop of Teano until his death in 1615 in Ascoli Piceno, Italy.

== External links and additional sources ==
- Cheney, David M. "Diocese of Teano". Catholic-Hierarchy.org. (for Chronology of Bishops) ^{[self-published]}
- Chow, Gabriel. "Diocese of Teano–Calvi (Italy)". GCatholic.org. (for Chronology of Bishops) ^{[self-published]}

Catholic Church titles
Preceded by Vincenzo Brancaleoni	Bishop of Teano; 1588–1615	Succeeded by Angelo della Ciaja
