= Arcangelo de' Bianchi =

Italian Roman Catholic cardinal and bishop

His Eminence Arcangelo de' Bianchi
- Cardinal-Priest of San Cesareo in Palatio
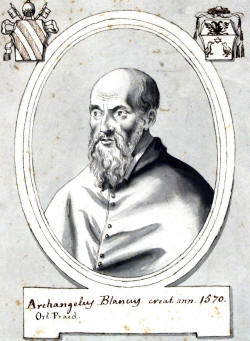
- Arcangelo de' Bianchi
- Church: Catholic Church
- Previous post: Bishop of Teano (1566–1575)

Orders
- Consecration: 21 September 1566 by Scipione Rebiba

Personal details
- Born: 4 October 1516 Gambolò, Italy
- Died: 18 January 1580 (aged 63) Rome, Italy

Arcangelo de' Bianchi (4 October 1516 – 18 January 1580) was an Italian Roman Catholic cardinal and bishop.

== Life and church ==
Arcangelo de' Bianchi was born in Gambolò, a village near Vigevano in the Piedmont, the son of Luigi Bianchi and Santina Panizzari. He was from a well-to-do family. At a young age, he entered the Dominican Order at Vigevano. He studied at the Monastery of San Domenico in Bologna, receiving a doctorate in Christian theology in 1527. After he was ordained as a priest in the Order of Preachers, he was assigned by his superiors to accompany Fra Michele Ghislieri, the future Pope Pius V, in many of his missions as an inquisitor. In 1559, Arcangelo became prior of Santa Maria delle Grazie, the famous Dominican convent in Milan. He became a Commissary of the Roman Inquisition in 1564, just as his patron Cardinal Ghislieri had in 1551. Pius IV made the appointment, in fact, on the recommendation of Cardinal Ghislieri, who had become one of the six cardinals of the Holy Inquisition.

On 16 September 1566 he was appointed Bishop of Teano by his friend Michele Ghislieri, who had been elected Pope Pius V earlier in that year. He was consecrated as a bishop in the Sistine Chapel by Scipione Rebiba, titular Latin Patriarch of Constantinople (1565–1573) on 21 September 1566 with Giulio Antonio Santorio, Archbishop of Santa Severina, and Carlo Grassi, Bishop of Corneto (Tarquinia) e Montefiascone, serving as co-consecrators. Arcangelo Bianchi was Bishop of Teano until September 1575. He resigned the government of his diocese sometime before 18 September 1575.

Pope Pius V made him a cardinal priest in the consistory of 17 May 1570. He received the red hat and the titular church of San Cesareo in Palatio on 3 July 1570. The pope named Cardinal de' Bianchi his confessor, as he had been earlier when they were travelling companions. He was present at the pope's death and heard his last confession.

He participated in the papal conclave of 1572 that elected Pope Gregory XIII. The new pope made him Prefect of the Index Librorum Prohibitorum. He died in Rome, at the age of sixty-four. He was buried in the Dominican church of Santa Sabina on the Aventine Hill. While bishop, he was the principal consecrator of Baldassarre Giustiniani, Bishop of Venosa (1572).

Catholic Church titles
Preceded by Girolamo Michele Nichesola	Bishop of Teano; 1566–1575	Succeeded by Giovanni Paolo Marincola
Preceded by Pier Francesco Ferrero	Cardinal-Priest of San Cesareo in Palatio; 1570–1580	Succeeded by abolished
Preceded by New creation	Prefect of the Congregation of the Index; 1572–1580	Succeeded by Guglielmo Sirleto
