= Vincenzo Brancaleoni =

Italian Roman Catholic prelate

Most Reverend Vincenzo Brancaleoni
- Bishop of Teano
- Church: Catholic Church
- Diocese: Diocese of Teano
- In office: 1588
- Predecessor: Giovanni Paolo Marincola
- Successor: Vincenzo Serafino

Personal details
- Died: August 1588 Teano, Italy

Vincenzo Brancaleoni (died August 1588) was a Roman Catholic prelate who served as Bishop of Teano (1588).

== Biography ==
On 9 March 1588, Vincenzo Brancaleoni was appointed by Pope Sixtus V as Bishop of Teano. He served as Bishop of Teano until his death in August 1588.

== See also ==
- Catholic Church in Italy

== External links and additional sources ==
- Cheney, David M. "Diocese of Teano". Catholic-Hierarchy.org. (for Chronology of Bishops) ^{[self-published]}
- Chow, Gabriel. "Diocese of Teano–Calvi (Italy)". GCatholic.org. (for Chronology of Bishops) ^{[self-published]}

Catholic Church titles
Preceded by Giovanni Paolo Marincola	Bishop of Teano; 1588	Succeeded by Vincenzo Serafino
