= San Paride ad Fontem, Teano =

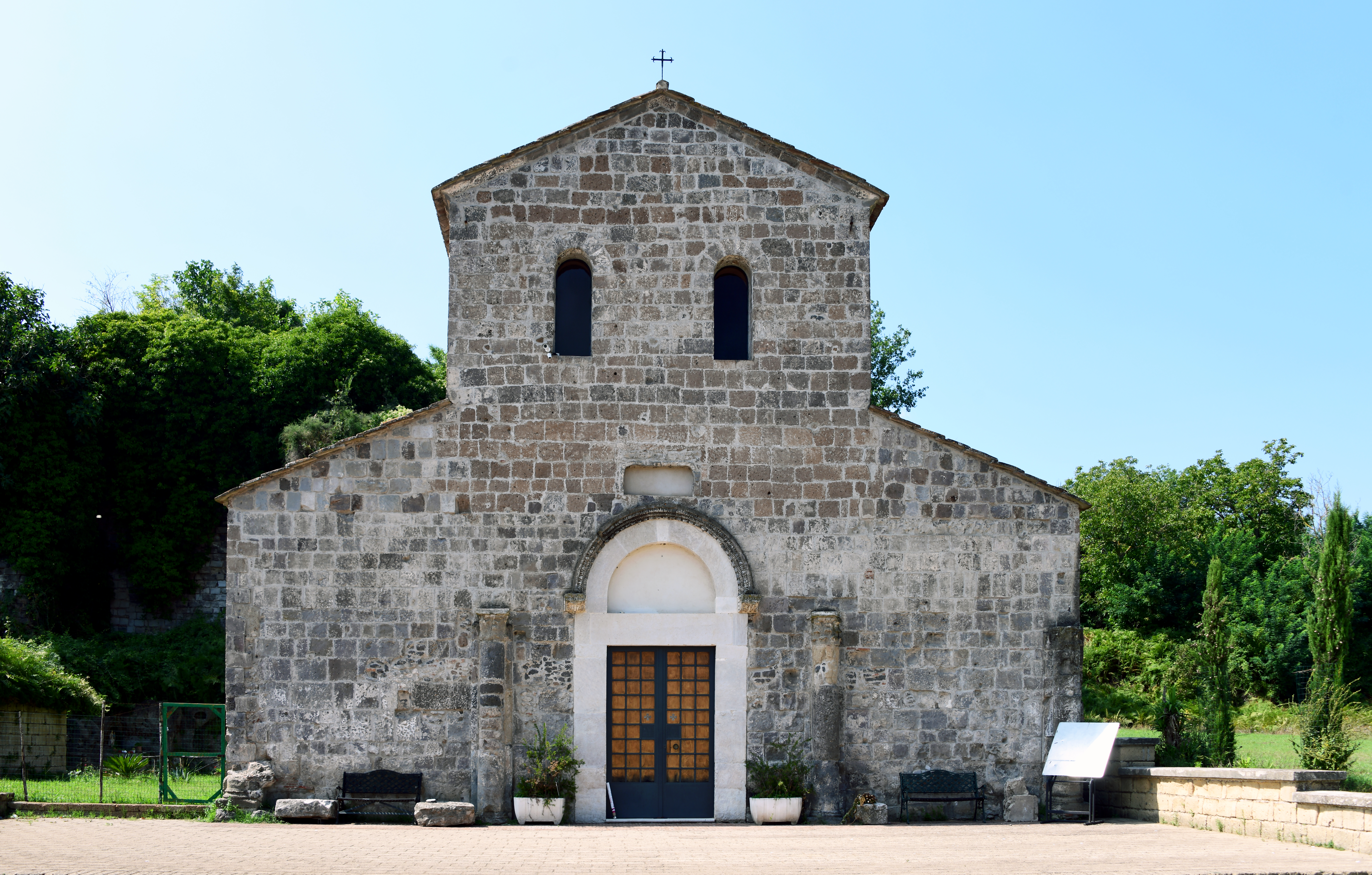
Façade of the church

San Paride ad Fontem in Teano is an ancient Romanesque-style, Roman Catholic church located in the Ternità neighborhood, about 1.5 kilometers southeast of the center of the town of Teano, province of Caserta, region of Campania, southern Italy.

It was named ad Fontem (Latin) because this low ground once had a spring at which St Paride of Teano (Paris of Teano), the town's 4th century bishop, preached. Paride bishop, born in Athens, was reputed to have miraculously tamed or killed a dragon living in a cave near town.

== History ==
A church at the site likely dates from the 4th century, since tomb epigraphs from this era have been found here. There may have been earlier Roman buildings here. Originally the cathedral of the land, it was replaced in this function by the Cathedral of Teano in 1236. The present building is a Romanesque structure, first mentioned in documents from the early 14th century. The church was constructed using local tuff, with three naves ending in a semicircular apse. The façade has four pilasters with Corinthian capitals likely used in an older building. The portal is simple. The walls are pierced with monofore windows.
