= Antonio Maria Sartori =

Italian Roman Catholic prelate

Most Reverend Antonio Maria Sartori
- Bishop of Teano
- Church: Catholic Church
- Diocese: Diocese of Teano
- In office: 1535–1556
- Predecessor: Giovanni Salviati
- Successor: Girolamo Michele Nichesola

Personal details
- Died: 1556 Teano, Italy

Antonio Maria Sartori (died 1556) was a Roman Catholic prelate who served as Bishop of Teano (1535–1556).

== Biography ==
On 30 April 1535, Antonio Maria Sartori was appointed by Pope Paul III as Bishop of Teano. He served as Bishop of Teano until his death in 1556.

== External links and additional sources ==
Catholic Church titles
Preceded by Giovanni Salviati	Bishop of Teano; 1535–1556	Succeeded by Girolamo Michele Nichesola
