= Saint Paris =

Roman Bishop

Saint Paris or Paris of Teano (Italian: San Paride di Teano; Latin: Sanctus Paridis) (d. 346 AD) was ordained Bishop of Teano by Pope Sylvester I. His feast day is August 5; he is venerated in the Eastern Orthodox Church and Roman Catholic Church.

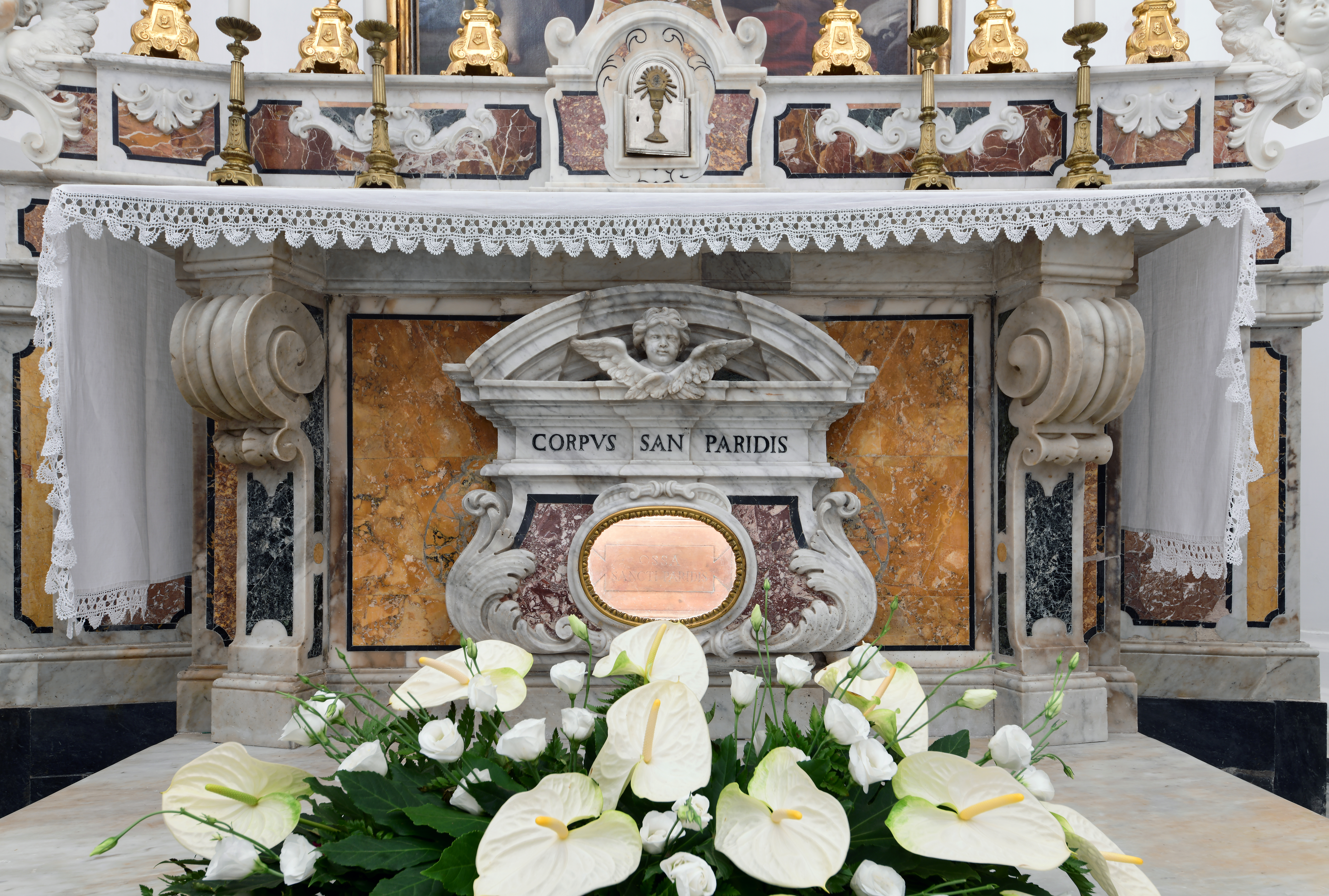
The tomb of Saint Paris

Many legends exist about him, but the only definite fact seems to be that he was a bishop of Teano. He was succeeded by Saint Amasio of Teano.

Pious legends say that Paris was born in Athens, Roman Greece and was the apostle and first bishop of Teano. He was reputed to have miraculously tamed or killed a dragon living in a cave near town. Another version says that when he arrived in town, the people were engaged in a pagan ritual honoring a snake god. Paris challenge the cult by capturing the monster with the help of a stick and leading him to die along the Savone river.

The original cathedral, San Paride ad Fontem ("Saint Paris at the Spring") was erected at that location and dedicated to him. Built over a Roman cistern, it was named ad Fontem because the low ground once had a spring at which Paris preached.

Paris died at Teano around 346. His remains lie in a chapel in the later Cathedral of San Clemente. His cult spread to other parts of Italy.

Baronius included his name in the Roman Martyrology at the request of church authorities of Teano.
