= Giovanni Battista Alfieri =

17th-century Roman Catholic bishop

Most Reverend Giovanni Battista Alfieri
- Bishop of Fano
- Church: Catholic Church
- Diocese: Diocese of Fano
- In office: 1649–1676
- Predecessor: Alessandro Castracani
- Successor: Angelo Maria Ranuzzi

Orders
- Consecration: 2 Jan 1650 by Marcantonio Franciotti

Personal details
- Born: Ostra Vetere, Italy
- Died: 17 September 1676

Giovanni Battista Alfieri (died 1676) was a Roman Catholic prelate who served as Bishop of Fano (1649–1676).

== Biography ==
Giovanni Battista Alfieri was born in Ostra Vetere, Italy. On 9 Dec 1649, he was appointed during the papacy of Pope Innocent X as Bishop of Fano. On 2 Jan 1650, he was consecrated bishop by Marcantonio Franciotti, Cardinal-Priest of Santa Maria della Pace, with Giovanni Battista Rinuccini, Archbishop of Fermo, and Giambattista Spínola (seniore), Archbishop of Acerenza e Matera, serving as co-consecrators. He served as Bishop of Fano until his death on 17 Sep 1676.

While bishop, he was the principal co-consecrator of Baldassarre Bonifazio, Bishop of Capodistria (1653); and Francesco de Andreis, Bishop of Nona (1653).

== External links and additional sources ==
- Cheney, David M. "Diocese of Fano-Fossombrone-Cagli-Pergola". Catholic-Hierarchy.org. (for Chronology of Bishops) ^{[self-published]}
- Chow, Gabriel. "Diocese of Fano-Fossombrone-Cagli-Pergola (Italy)". GCatholic.org. (for Chronology of Bishops) ^{[self-published]}

Catholic Church titles
Preceded by Alessandro Castracani	Bishop of Fano; 1649–1676	Succeeded by Angelo Maria Ranuzzi
