= Vincenzo Rimedio =

Italian Roman Catholic bishop (born 1927)

His Excellency Vincenzo Rimedio
- Bishop Emeritus of Lamezia Terme
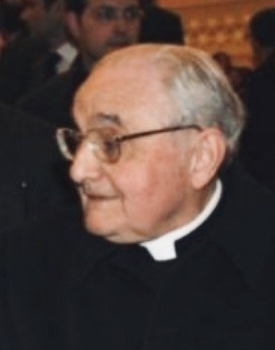
- Church: Catholic Church
- Diocese: Diocese of Lamezia Terme
- Appointed: 4 September 1982
- Term ended: 24 January 2004
- Predecessor: Ferdinando Palatucci
- Successor: Luigi Antonio Cantafora

Orders
- Ordination: 22 July 1951
- Consecration: 28 October 1982

Personal details
- Born: 5 December 1927 (age 98) Soriano Calabro, Kingdom of Italy
- Denomination: Roman Catholic
- Motto: In veritate et caritate
- Coat of arms

Vincenzo Rimedio (born 5 December 1927) is an Italian Roman Catholic prelate who served as the Bishop of the Diocese of Lamezia Terme from 1982 to 2004. He is known for his pastoral leadership, cultural engagement, and philosophical and theological writings.

== Early life and education ==
Rimedio was born in Soriano Calabro, in the region of Calabria, southern Italy. He pursued ecclesiastical studies in philosophy and theology and was ordained to the priesthood on 22 July 1951 for the Diocese of Mileto-Nicotera-Tropea.

== Priesthood ==
During his years as a priest, Rimedio served in several parishes in Calabria and taught philosophy in secondary education. He also held administrative roles within the diocesan structure, including that of vicar general.

== Episcopate ==
On 4 September 1982, Rimedio was appointed Bishop of Nicastro by Pope John Paul II. He received episcopal consecration on 28 October 1982. In 1986, the diocese was renamed the Diocese of Lamezia Terme.

During his episcopate, which lasted until his retirement on 24 January 2004, he promoted pastoral renewal and diocesan reorganization, including the celebration of a diocesan synod, the establishment of new parishes, and the reopening of diocesan seminaries.
