= Lamezia Terme Town Library =

Public library in Italy

The Lamezia Terme Town Library is located in the historic centre of the former village of Nicastro, in the province of Catanzaro in the Calabria region of Italy. It is situated in the Nicotera-Severisio historical building located in the Tommaso Campanella square.

The town library belongs to the Territorial Library System of Lamezia Terme which also includes other 17 towns libraries of as many towns of the Lamezia Terme area.

== History ==
The library was founded in 1897 by collecting all book funds taken from the Dominican and Capuchin convents in Nicastro. Which altogether added to modern books and a dedicated collection of books about Calabria and Lamezia Terme itself, reaches a number of 25,000 volumes.

== Services and reading rooms ==
The library has three main rooms:

- Reading Room (first floor): this room is equipped with big tables and it includes the book collection for Art, Law literature, Medicine, Science, History and Geography
- Multimedia Room (ground floor): this room is equipped with four computers with internet access
- Kids room (first floor): this room is equipped with big tables and collections available in CD, DVD, VHS, interactive games and guided support for internet based searches.

It is possible to ask to the library staff any information regarding the book collection and also to ask for a guided tour of the historical building that currently hosts the library, which is the old house of a famous noble family of the former village of Nicastro.

== Casa del Libro Antico (House of the Ancient Book) ==
The Casa del Libro Antico (the House of the Ancient Book) is the historical and specialised section of the town library. It was founded in 2002 to take care of the historical book funds belonging to the Capuchin and Dominican convents of Nicastro which were confiscated in 1866 because of the suppression of the religious orders. All those books are an invaluable evidence of how important a book was especially for the Dominican friars who strictly respected and kept all the books they had, being those very expensive for either clergyman or lay readers.

=== Collection ===
The collection includes mainly printed books about theology, philosophy, patrology, ecclesiastical history and exegesis, homiletics, hagiography, all dated from the 11th to the 19th century, among which it is worth mentioning some with annotations from Tommaso Campanella who studied Aristotelian logic in the village of Nicastro (now Lamezia Terme) between the years 1585 and 1587. There are in fact more than thirty books from the 16th century which are all about the Aristotelian Philosophy and its classic commentators such as Averroes, Alexander of Aphrodisias, Theodorus Gaza, Saint Thomas, averroistic books by Agostino Nifo and Marcantonio Zimara and Crisostomo Iavelli, mentioned by Tommaso Campanella himself in his Philosophia sensibus demonstrata and interesting it is that some of those books contain also annotations from original authors.

In addition to the printed books, the collection includes also some manuscripts and fragments of manuscripts, of Greek and Latin illuminated codices so that the total number of books reaches more than 2,500 volumes, all dated from the 16th to the 19th century and some of them printed in various Italian and European old centres of excellence of the art of typography, such as the presses of Aldus Manutius, Lucantonio Giunta, Gabriele Giolito de' Ferrari, Froben and Plantin.

There are also several books by Thomas Aquinas, such as Summa Theologica, the aristotelian books in different editions and other books with his comments such as the Epistles by Saint Paul (Paris, 1541), where two long annotations can be found regarding a topic also debated and examined in depth by Tommaso Campanella: the absence of sin in Christ and the Virgin Mary's immunity from the original sin.

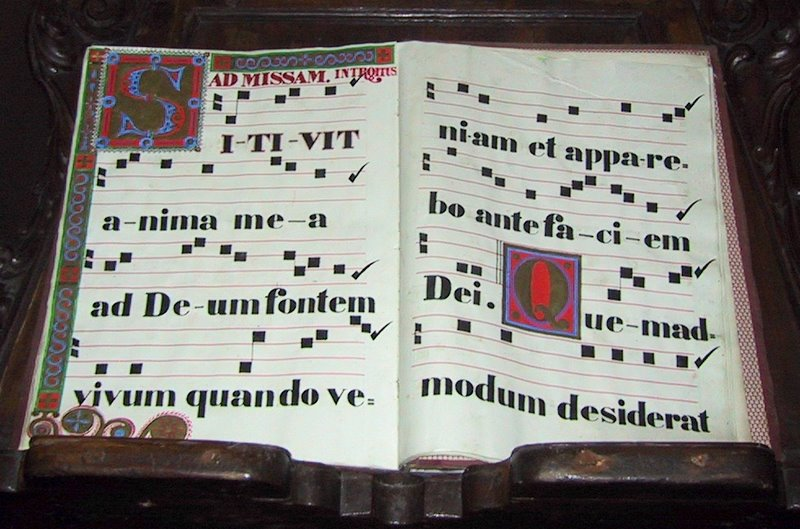
Manuscript of the Introit of the Mass (Florence, Italy).

In order to give evidence of the importance that the singing had during the religious service for the Dominicans, the collection exhibits some liturgical books from the 18th century with an attractive red and black printing of the lyrics and accompaniment. It is worth mentioning that only one of these books is previous to the Council of Trent, which is the Repertorium morale by Berchorius (Lyon, 1520) where it is also possible to find an annotation from a certain Tommaso from Squillace (i.e. Tommaso Campanella) and where all pages are marked at the top with a specific annotation about the sacred writer discussed in there, which was probably a necessary thing to do for a quick reference or to memorize in a more visual way the content of the book because of the gothic characters used for the printing which were quite difficult to read.

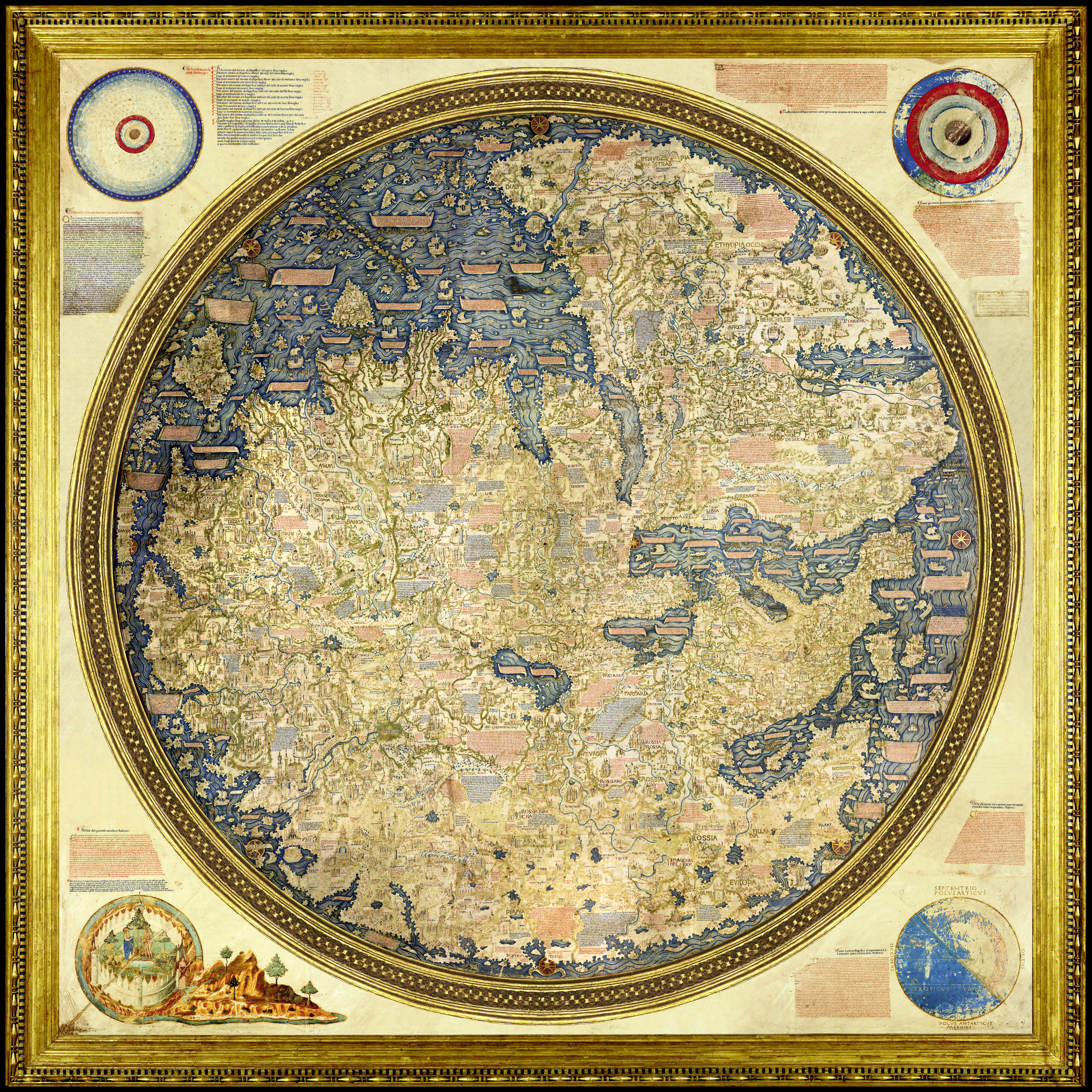
The Fra Mauro Map in its normal orientation (South at the top).

In addition to the book collection there are also a completely restored celestial globe dated back to 1695 plus a not restored terrestrial one dated back to 1744. The first one was produced in Rome by the Calchographia Dominici de Rubeis in 1695 with an illustration of the vault of heaven based on the observations of Tycho Brahe whereas the second, with the illustrations of seas and lands, was produced yet in Rome but by the Calcografia della Reverenda Camera Apostolica in 1744. The two globes had been mentioned by Vito Capialbi (a famous Italian archeologist of the 19th century) in his report about Calabrian libraries as kept in the collection of another Dominican friary of Soriano Calabro and from Tommaso Campanella in his The City of the Sun. There are also shown some very high quality reproductions of the Fra Mauro world map (the original is the Biblioteca Marciana library in Venice and where south is shown at the top and north at the bottom of the map), of the Codex Rossanensis (the original is in the diocesan museum of Rossano) and of the Tabula Peutingeriana.

The following ones are some of ancient books included in the collection:

- Metamorphoses by Ovid, restored and illustrated with woodprints, dated 1536
- Liturgical books owned by the Dominican friars of Nicastro and dated 1656
- Conceptos de la Sagrada Escrit, by Bernardo de Ribera as an evidence of preaching in the Spanish language, either as a free choice or perhaps dictated, with an annotation of ownership on the title page: "fr. Ambrosius de Neocastro lector e filius Con(ven)tus Neocastri", which shows that the book was used by a clergyman of the village of Nicastro
- Considerationi Predicabili sopra gli Evangeli della Quaresima et altre feste, 1665 by Domenico De Sanctis
- Institutiones ad Christianam Theolo(giam), Venice 1575 by Giovanni Viguerio
- M. Tullii Ciceronis Rhetoricorum ad Herenium Libri Quatuor, Venice 1584
- Sermoni domenicali by Anthony of Padua, Venice 1574
- Summa summarum also called Summa Silvestrina, two volumes dated 1581
- Commentarium in quartum sententiarum, by Domenico Soto
- Le vite dei Cesari by Suetonius, Venice 1506
- De Vitis Pontificum Romanorum by Bartolomeo Sacchi also called il Platina, Cologne 1568, mentioned by Tommaso Campanella in his Historiographia
- De civitate Dei by Saint Augustine, Venice 1570
- Bibbia con glossa ordinaria e Postilla by Nicolo' da Lyra, Venice 1588
- Opera Omnia by Saint Augustine, Rome 1579-87
- Candelabrum Aureum, 1608

==== Prohibited publications ====
The collection includes also books of a very high historical value as they prove the laws that ruled what was legitimate or not to read as well as the ongoing prohibitions during the past centuries. Those rules might be the reason why three very different books stored in the library of Lamezia have been bound together, those are the Lapsi, Punitim ac Reparati Orbis Catastrophe. Poema Sacrum printed in Naples in 1666 and dedicated to Ioanni Caramueli(a Campanian bishop also author of some comments to this poem), a mystical essay by Pope Innocent III published in 1534 in the Protestant city of Leipzig (therefore unpopular) and a folk tale related to the Dominican friary of Soriano Calabro published in Messina in 1696. The cautious illuminator who put together these books in fact, hid them using the title Poema Sacrum de Contemptu mundi. There are other prohibited books included in the old Dominican collection, for instance the Bibliotecha Interpretum (1638) by Xantes Mariales, books by Zacharia Pasqualigi and three different editions of the Ecclesiastical History by Alessandro Natale (he became a prohibited author as he defended the doctrine of the Gallican Church), a Venetian one of 1732 by Amat the Graveson, a Parisian one of 1740 and a Neapolitan one of 1740 by Roncaglia. Because of the ecclesiastical censorship, the books printed during the 16th century in the cities of Basel, Frankfurt and other suspicious places (even if they were birth places for saints or Doctors of the Church, had been inked in order to cover all of a portion of a text classified as prohibited, which is what happened to the six big volumes of the Theatrum Humanae Vitae (Basel, 1586-87) by Theodor Zwinger stored in Lamezia though thanks to this expedient, the books were not destroyed and survived up to now. There is also a vocabulary from Greek to Latin included in the collection and printed in Basel in 1524 that has been inked for all the occurrences of the word Basel. Same destiny applied to the Metamorphoses by Ovid, of which the Venetian version of 1536 has been ruined by the censorship ink for entire pages.

The following ones are some of prohibited publications included in the collection:

- De Eminentissima Deiparae Virginis Perfectione by Joanne Maria Zamoro (Venice, 1629) which treats about Virgin Mary's original sin, classified as unmentionable topic and a deadly sin
- Autographic letter with original seal by Ilarione from Feroleto, a village close to Lamezia Terme, about the loan of a prohibited book, dated 1749
- Index Librorum Prohibitorum in the edition of 1711 where the Pope was Clement XI
