= Giovanni Salviati =

Florentine diplomat and cardinal

His Eminence Giovanni Salviati
- Cardinal-Bishop of Porto–Santa Rufina
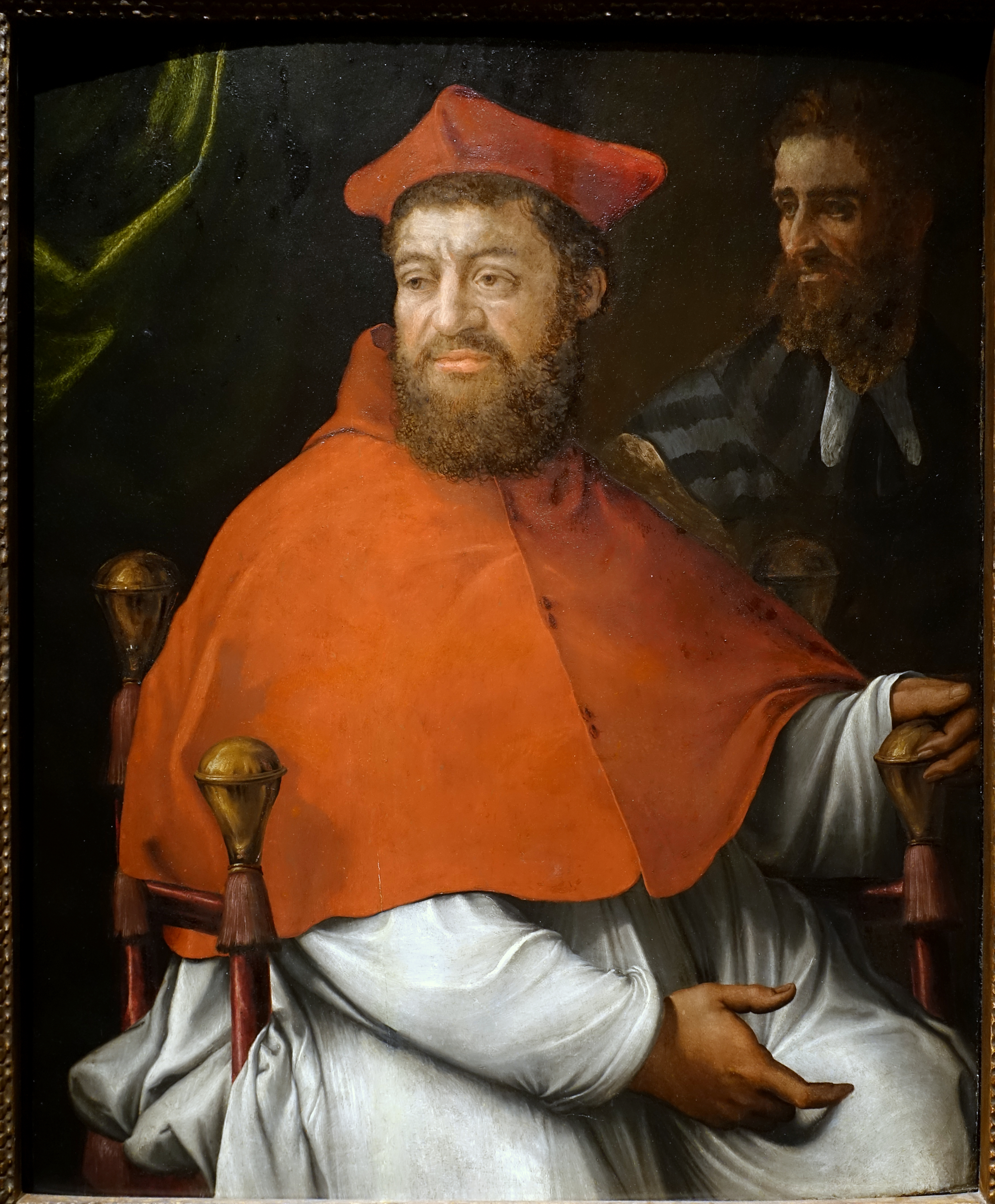
- Potrait by Sebastiano del Piombo, 1531
- Church: Catholic Church
- Appointed: 8 October 1546
- Term ended: 28 October 1553
- Predecessor: Marino Grimani
- Successor: Gian Pietro Carafa
- Previous posts: Cardinal-Deacon of Santi Cosma e Damiano (1517–1543); Cardinal-Bishop of Albano (1543–1544); Cardinal-Bishop of Sabina (1544–1546)

Orders
- Created cardinal: 1 July 1517 by Pope Leo X
- Rank: Cardinal-Bishop

Personal details
- Born: 24 March 1490 Florence, Italy
- Died: 28 October 1553 (aged 37) Ravenna. Italy
- Parents: Jacopo Salviati (Father); Lucrezia de' Medici (Mother)
- Coat of arms

Giovanni Salviati (24 March 1490 – 28 October 1553) was a Florentine diplomat and cardinal. He was papal legate in France, and conducted negotiations with the Emperor Charles V.

== Biography ==
Salviati was born in Florence to Jacopo Salviati, son of Giovanni Salviati and Maddalena Gondi, and Lucrezia di Lorenzo de' Medici, elder daughter of Lorenzo de' Medici. In Rome, he was educated in Latin, Greek, and Hebrew by Marcello Virgilio Adriani and Fra Zanobi Acciajuoli. Pope Leo X, who raised him to the cardinalate in 1517, was Lorenzo's son, and therefore Giovanni's uncle. His brother Bernardo Salviati and nephew Anton Maria Salviati also became cardinals. He was also Cousin of Catherine de' Medici from whom he derived patronage.

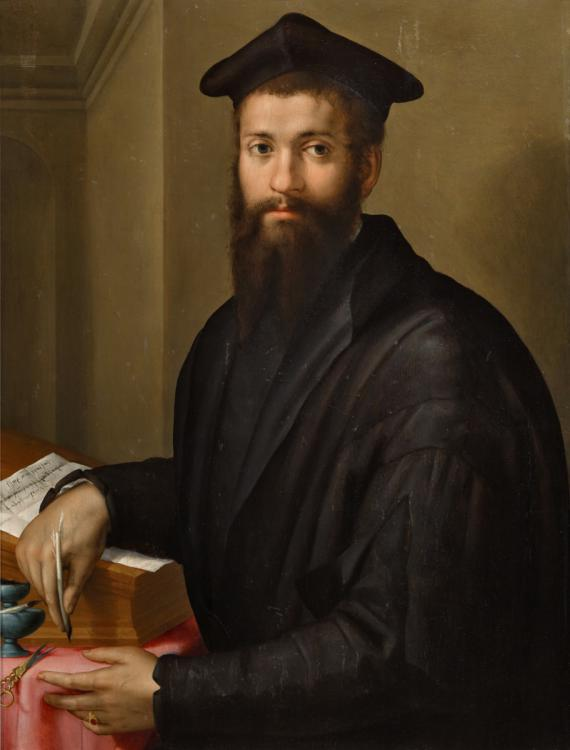
Portrait, oil on canvas, of Giovanni Salviati (1490–1553) by Pier Francesco Foschi (1502–1567)

He held many posts. He was protonotary apostolic, bishop of Porto e Santa Rufina, and sub-dean of the Sacred College of Cardinals. In 1525, he was sent as a legate to Madrid to negotiate the withdrawal of Imperial troops from the papal states and to help negotiate the release of the captured French King Francis I. In 1526, Salviati signed for his cousin, Pope Clement VII, the treaty formulating the League of Cognac which allied against Charles V. He became Bishop of Albano in 1543. He was appointed Administrator of Oloron Diocese in 1520. and attended the Papal conclave of 1549–50 as a cardinal.

He was on friendly terms with Machiavelli, writing to him. The Mannerist painter Cecchino (Francesco) Salviati (Francesco de' Rossi) took the name Salviati from Giovanni, who was his patron. He employed the composer Jacques du Pont.

Salviati died in Ravenna on 28 October 1553.

== Notes ==
Catholic Church titles
Preceded by Innocenzo Cibo	Cardinal-Deacon of Santi Cosma e Damiano; 1517–1543	Succeeded by Giacomo Savelli
Preceded by Francesco de Remolins	Administrator of Fermo; 1518–1521	Succeeded by Niccolò Gaddi
Preceded by Ippolito d'Este	Administrator of Ferrara; 1520–1550	Succeeded by Luigi d'Este
Preceded by Arnaud-Raymond de Béon	Administrator of Oloron; 1521–1523	Succeeded by Jacques de Foix
Preceded by Francesco della Rovere	Administrator of Volterra; 1530–1532	Succeeded by Giovanni Matteo Sartori
Preceded by Francisco Borja	Administrator of Teano; 1531–1535	Succeeded by Antonio Maria Sartori
Preceded by Giovanni Matteo Sartori	Administrator of Santa Severina; 1531–1535	Succeeded by Giulio Sartori
Preceded by Laurent Serristori	Administrator of Bitetto; 1532–1539	Succeeded by Luigi Serristori
Preceded by Tommaso Cortesi	Administrator of Vaison; 1535–1536	Succeeded by Jacopo Cortesi
Preceded by Charles de Bar	Administrator of Saint-Papoul; 1538–1549	Succeeded by Bernardo Salviati
Preceded by Antonio Pucci	Cardinal-Bishop of Albano; 1543–1544	Succeeded by Gian Pietro Carafa
Preceded by Antonio Pucci	Cardinal-Bishop of Sabina; 1544–1546	Succeeded by Gian Pietro Carafa
Preceded by Marino Grimani	Cardinal-Bishop of Porto e Santa Rufina; 1546–1553	Succeeded by Gian Pietro Carafa
