= Francisco Borja =

Italian Roman Catholic prelate

Most Reverend Francisco Borja
- Bishop of Teano
- Church: Catholic Church
- Diocese: Diocese of Teano
- In office: 1508–1531
- Predecessor: Francisco de Borja
- Successor: Giovanni Salviati

Personal details
- Died: Teano, Italy

Francisco Borja was a Roman Catholic prelate who served as Bishop of Teano (1508–1531).

== Biography ==
Francisco Borja was the nephew of Cardinal Francisco de Borja y Navarro de Alpicat, himself a nephew of Pope Alexander VI.

On 5 July 1508, Francisco Borja was appointed by Pope Julius II to succeed his uncle, who had resigned in his favor, as Bishop of Teano. He served as Bishop of Teano until his resignation in 1531.

== See also ==
- Catholic Church in Italy

== External links and additional sources ==
- Cheney, David M. "Diocese of Teano". Catholic-Hierarchy.org. (for Chronology of Bishops) ^{[self-published]}
- Chow, Gabriel. "Diocese of Teano–Calvi (Italy)". GCatholic.org. (for Chronology of Bishops) ^{[self-published]}

Catholic Church titles
Preceded by Francisco de Borja	Bishop of Teano; 1508–1531	Succeeded by Giovanni Salviati
