= Ireneo Brasavola =

Italian theologian and bishop (1562–1621)

Ireneo Brasavola, O.F.M.
- Church: Catholic Church
- See: Castro del Lazio
- Appointed: 9 January 1617
- Term ended: 23 March 1621
- Predecessor: Antonio Massa
- Successor: Alessandro Carissimi

Orders
- Consecration: 15 Jan 1617 (Bishop) by Card. Bevilacqua

Personal details
- Born: c. 1562 Ferrara
- Died: March 23, 1621 (aged 58–59) Castro, Lazio
- Buried: Cathedral of Castro

Ireneo Brasavola (or Brassavola, Latin: Irenaeus Brasauolus, born as Francesco Brasavola; 1562 – 1621) was an Italian theologian and bishop of Castro, Lazio, from 1617 to his death.

== Life ==
Ireneo Brasavola was born at Ferrara on about 1562 and he was educated by Francesco Maria II della Rovere, Duke of Urbino. On 17 December 1578 in Bologna he entered in the Order of Friars Minor taking the religious name of Ireneo. He was ordained priest in 1584 and celebrated his first Mass in Urbino. He became a teacher of philosophy and theology in the convents of his order. As a theologian, Ireneo was a follower of Duns Scotus, he also a Franciscan. From 1608 he served as superior of the Friars Minor in Bologna and on 15 January 1611 he became Provincial superior.

He was appointed on 9 March 1617 by Pope Paul V, to the Bishopric of Castro, a town North of Rome but ruled by Ranuccio I Farnese, Duke of Parma, protector of Brasavola. The episcopal consecration followed on 15 January in Rome by the hands of Cardinal Bonifazio Bevilacqua Aldobrandini.

Ireneo Brasavola died in Castro on 23 March 1621. He was buried in the cathedral of that town.

== Works ==
Quaestio de primis, ac secundis intentionibus (Venice 1591), Quaestionum vniuersalium Ioan. Duns Scoti expositio eruditissima, & accurata (Venice 1599), Quaestiones quolibetales, seu Miscellaneae theologicae, ac philosophicae, omnibus, praecipuèque doctrinam Scoti profitentibus necessariae (Venice 1600).
