= Paolo Capizucchi =

16th-century Roman Catholic bishop

Most Reverend Paolo Capizucchi
- Bishop of Nicastro
- Church: Catholic Church
- Diocese: Diocese of Nicastro
- In office: 1533–1539
- Predecessor: Nicola Regitano
- Successor: Marcello Cervini

Orders
- Consecration: 14 Feb 1535 by Agostino Spínola

Personal details
- Died: 6 August 1539

Paolo Capizucchi (died 1539) was a Roman Catholic prelate who served as Bishop of Nicastro (1533–1539).

== Biography ==
On 7 Nov 1533, Paolo Capizucchi was appointed during the papacy of Pope Clement VII as Bishop of Nicastro. On 14 Feb 1535, he was consecrated bishop by Agostino Spínola, Cardinal-Priest of Sant'Apollinare. He served as Bishop of Nicastro until his death on 6 Aug 1539.

== External links and additional sources ==
- Cheney, David M. "Diocese of Lamezia Terme". Catholic-Hierarchy.org. (for Chronology of Bishops) ^{[self-published]}
- Chow, Gabriel. "Diocese of Lamezia Terme (Italy)". GCatholic.org. (for Chronology of Bishops) ^{[self-published]}

Catholic Church titles
Preceded by Nicola Regitano	Bishop of Nicastro; 1533–1539	Succeeded by Marcello Cervini
