= Alessandro Castracani =

Italian Roman Catholic prelate (1580–1649)

Most Reverend Alessandro Castracani
- Bishop of Fano
- Church: Catholic Church
- Diocese: Diocese of Fano
- In office: 1643–1649
- Predecessor: Ettore Diotallevi
- Successor: Giovanni Battista Alfieri
- Previous posts: Bishop of Nicastro (1629–1632); Apostolic Nuncio to Savoy (1629–1634); Apostolic Collector to Portugal (1634–1640)

Orders
- Consecration: 28 October 1629 by Luigi Caetani

Personal details
- Born: 1580 Fano, Italy
- Died: 22 July 1649 (aged 68–69) Fano, Italy (age 69)

Alessandro Castracani or Alessandro Castracane (1580 – 22 July 1649) was a Roman Catholic prelate who served as Bishop of Fano (1643–1649), Apostolic Collector to Portugal (1634–1640), Apostolic Nuncio to Savoy (1629–1634), and Bishop of Nicastro (1629–1632).

== Biography ==
Alessandro Castracani was born in Fano, Italy in 1580. On 11 October 1629, he was appointed during the papacy of Pope Urban VIII as Bishop of Nicastro and on 11 Oct 1629 as Apostolic Nuncio to Savoy. On 28 October 1629, he was consecrated bishop by Luigi Caetani, Cardinal-Priest of Santa Pudenziana, with Pietro Francesco Montorio, Bishop Emeritus of Nicastro, and Francesco Venturi, Bishop Emeritus of San Severo, serving as co-consecrators. On 22 June 1632, he resigned as Bishop of Nicastro and on 30 July 1634, he resigned as Apostolic Nuncio to Savoy. On 30 September 1634, he was appointed during the papacy of Pope Urban VIII as Apostolic Collector to Portugal where he served until his resignation on 15 November 1640. On 22 June 1643, he was appointed during the papacy of Pope Urban VIII as Bishop of Fano. He served as Bishop of Fano until his death on 22 July 1649.

== Episcopal succession ==
Episcopal succession of Alessandro Castracani

While bishop, he was the principal consecrator of:

- António da Ressurreição, Bishop of Angra (1635);

and the principal co-consecrator of:

- Giovanni Giacomo Panciroli, Titular Patriarch of Constantinople (1642);
- Isidoro della Robbia, Bishop of Bertinoro (1642);
- Maurizio Solaro (di Moretta), Bishop of Mondovi (1642);
- Gian Vincenzo de' Giuli, Bishop of Massa Lubrense (1645);
- Roberto Fontana, Bishop of Modena (1645); and
- Gregorio Coppino, Bishop of Sant'Angelo dei Lombardi e Bisaccia (1645).

== External links and additional sources ==
- Cheney, David M. "Nunciature to Savoy". Catholic-Hierarchy.org. (for Chronology of Bishops) ^{[self-published]}
- Cheney, David M. "Nunciature to Portugal". Catholic-Hierarchy.org. ^{[self-published]}
- Chow, Gabriel. "Apostolic Nunciature Portugal". GCatholic.org. Archived from the original on February 7, 2023. ^{[self-published]}
- Cheney, David M. "Diocese of Lamezia Terme". Catholic-Hierarchy.org. (for Chronology of Bishops) ^{[self-published]}
- Chow, Gabriel. "Diocese of Lamezia Terme (Italy)". GCatholic.org. (for Chronology of Bishops) ^{[self-published]}
- Cheney, David M. "Diocese of Fano-Fossombrone-Cagli-Pergola". Catholic-Hierarchy.org. (for Chronology of Bishops) ^{[self-published]}
- Chow, Gabriel. "Diocese of Fano-Fossombrone-Cagli-Pergola (Italy)". GCatholic.org. (for Chronology of Bishops) ^{[self-published]}

Catholic Church titles
Preceded by Baldassarre Bolognetti	Bishop of Nicastro; 1629–1632	Succeeded by Giovan Battista Curiale
Preceded by Aloysius Galli	Apostolic Nuncio to Savoy; 1629–1634	Succeeded by Fausto Caffarelli
Preceded by Lorenzo Tramallo	Apostolic Collector to Portugal; 1634–1640	Succeeded by Francesco Ravizza
Preceded by Ettore Diotallevi	Bishop of Fano; 1643–1649	Succeeded by Giovanni Battista Alfieri
