= Luigi Antonio Cantafora =

Italian Roman Catholic prelate (1943–2025)

- Bishop Emeritus of Lamezia Terme
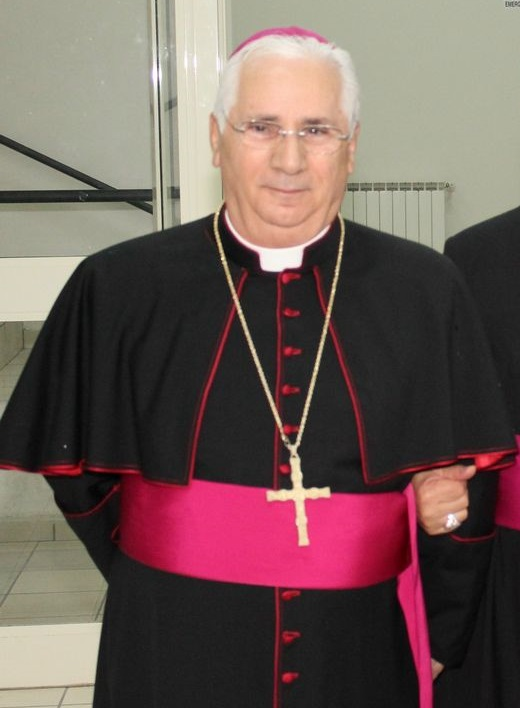
- Cantafora in 2013
- Archdiocese: Catanzaro-Squillace
- Diocese: Lamezia Terme
- Appointed: 24 January 2004
- Installed: 2 April 2004
- Term ended: 3 May 2019
- Predecessor: Vincenzo Rimedio
- Successor: Giuseppe Schillaci

Orders
- Ordination: 19 July 1969 by Pietro Raimondi
- Consecration: 25 March 2004 by Paolo Romeo

Personal details
- Born: 10 April 1943 Scandale, Calabria, Italy
- Died: 19 July 2025 (aged 82) Crotone, Calabria, Italy
- Motto: Charitas Christi Urget Nos
- Coat of arms

Styles of Luigi Antonio Cantafora
- Reference style: His Excellency; The Most Reverend
- Spoken style: Your Excellency
- Religious style: Bishop

Luigi Antonio Cantafora (10 April 1943 – 19 July 2025) was an Italian Roman Catholic prelate. He served as bishop of the Roman Catholic Diocese of Lamezia Terme from 2004 to 2019.

== Biography ==
Cantafora was born in Scandale (province of Crotone) in 1943. He studied at the Minor Seminary in Crotone and the regional Major Seminary in Catanzaro. After ordination in 1969 he served as chancellor of the Curia in Crotona (1970–1973), priest of SS. Veneranda and Anastasia in Crotone, and then Rector of S. Giuseppe (1970–1975). He was episcopal vicar for pastoral affairs (1975), and an honorary Canon of the Cathedral of Crotone (1989). He was appointed a member of the diocesan College of Consultors (1994–1999), and then Administrator of the parish of Our Lady of Mount Carmel in Crotone (from 2001). He was Vicar Forane for the city of Crotone.

Cantafora died in Crotone, Calabria on 19 July 2025, at the age of 82.

Catholic Church titles
Preceded by Vincenzo Rimedio	Bishop of Lamezia Terme; 2004–2019	Succeeded by Giuseppe Schillaci
