= Amasio of Teano =

Bishop of Teano

Saint Amasio of Teano the second bishop of Teano in Italy.

According to his Vita, Amasio was a Greek who was forced into exile, fleeing the persecution of the Arian Emperor Constantius. Pope Julius I invited him to preach in Campania. In Sora he healed a boy with gout and performed other miracles, but was later expelled by the Arian faction.

In 346 Julius appointed him bishop of Teano in the Province of Caserta in succession to Saint Paris, and consecrated him bishop in the Basilica of Santi Apostoli, Rome. The Sorani, to repair the offense done to him, erected a church in his honor.

Amasio died around 356; his feast day is 23 January.

"In Teano in Campania, commemoration of Saint Amasio, bishop, around 356." (Roman martyrology) His cult is still alive in several dioceses in central Italy.
