= Antonio Caetani (iuniore) =

Italian Catholic cardinal (1566–1624)

His Eminence Antonio Caetani
- Cardinal-Priest of Santa Pudenziana; Archbishop of Capua
- Church: Catholic Church

Orders
- Consecration: 11 Sep 1605 by Roberto Francesco Romolo Bellarmino

Personal details
- Born: 1566 Rome, Italy
- Died: 17 Mar 1624 (age 58)

Antonio Caetani, iuniore (1566–1624) was a Roman Catholic cardinal.

== Biography ==
On 11 Sep 1605, he was consecrated bishop by Roberto Francesco Romolo Bellarmino, Cardinal-Priest of San Matteo in Merulana.

== Episcopal succession ==
While bishop, he was the principal consecrator of:

- Charles von Lamberg, Archbishop of Prague (1607);
- Pedro González del Castillo, Bishop of Calahorra y La Calzada (1614);
- Alsono Martín de Zuñiga, Bishop of Oviedo (1616);
- Cristoforo Caetani, Titular Bishop of Laodicea in Phrygia and Coadjutor Bishop of Foligno (1623);
- Felice Siliceo, Bishop of Troia (1623);

and the principal co-consecrator of:

- Ottavio Acquaviva d'Aragona (seniore), Archbishop of Naples (1605); and
- Mario Cossa, Bishop of Montalcino (1607).

Catholic Church titles
Preceded by Roberto Francesco Romolo Bellarmino	Archbishop of Capua; 1605–1624	Succeeded by Luigi Caetani
Preceded by Juan Esteban Ferrero	Apostolic Nuncio to Emperor; 1607–1610	Succeeded by Giovanni Battista Salvago
Preceded by Decio Carafa	Apostolic Nuncio to Spain; 1611–1618	Succeeded by Francesco Cennini de' Salamandri
Preceded by Roberto Ubaldini	Cardinal-Priest of Santa Pudenziana; 1621–1624	Succeeded by Luigi Caetani
