= Lamezia Terme =

- Comune
- Città di Lamezia Terme
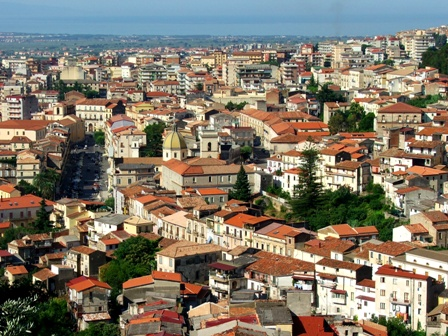
- View of Nicastro

- Coat of arms

- Location within Italy Location within Calabria
- Coordinates: 38°58′N 16°18′E
- Country: Italy
- Region: Calabria
- Province: Catanzaro (CZ)
- Frazioni: Acquafredda, Bella Di Lamezia Terme, Caronte, Fronti, Gabella, San Pietro Lametino, Zangarona, Acquadauzano, Agli, Annunziata, Bastioni Di Malta, Bosco Amatello II, Bosco Amatello Iv, Bucolia, Bucolia Superiore III, Cafarone, Cantarelle, Carrà Cosentino I, Carrà Cosentino II, Carrà Cosentino V, Case Caria, Case Valenzi II, Case Vescio, Censi, Crozzano, Cuturella, Felicetta, Ficarella, Ianipari I, Lagani III, Lamezia Golfo, Magolà, Marinella, Marrano, Maruca, Miglierina, Mitoio I, Mitoio II, Muretto, Pane, Piano Luppino, Prato, Priano, Richetti I, Richetti II, Richetti III, San Minà, Sant'Ermia, Santa Domenica, Santa Eufemia Vetere, Santa Maria, Schieno Vieste, Serra, Serra Castagna, Spineto, Telara, Vallericciardo Inferiore, Vallericciardo Superiore, Verità I, Vonio, Zinnavo

Government
  - Mayor: Mario Murone (Centre-right independent)

Area
  - Total: 162.43 km^{2} (62.71 sq mi)
- Elevation: 216 m (709 ft)

Population (2026)
  - Total: 67,005
  - Density: 412.52/km^{2} (1,068.4/sq mi)
- Demonym: Lametini
- Time zone: UTC+1 (CET)
  - Summer (DST): UTC+2 (CEST)
- Postal code: 88046
- Dialing code: 0968
- Patron saint: St. Peters and Paul
- Saint day: 29 June
- Website: Official website

Lamezia Terme (Italian pronunciation: [laˈmɛttsja ˈtɛrme]), commonly called Lamezia, is a city and municipality (comune) in the province of Catanzaro in the region of Calabria in southern Italy, located about 110 kilometres (68 mi) northeast of Reggio Calabria and 25 kilometres (16 mi) west of Catanzaro. It has 67,005 inhabitants.

== History ==
The municipality of Lamezia Terme was formally created on 4 January 1968. Its territory includes those of the former municipalities of Nicastro, Sambiase and Sant'Eufemia Lamezia.

=== Nicastro ===
Nicastro's origins trace back to the 9th century, when Calabria was part of the Byzantine Empire, when a fortress called Neo Castrum ("New Castle") was created. A great Benedictine abbey, St. Eufemia, was founded here in 1062 by the Norman count Robert Guiscard. It was for a long time a fief of the Caracciolo family and, later, to the D'Aquino. The city was nearly destroyed after an earthquake in 1638 (more than 100 inhabitants died), and the abbey was turned into ruin. The castle, built by the Normans and enlarged by Emperor Frederick II and the Angevine kings, crumbled down. Floods and a further earthquake followed in the 18th century.

Until the 18th century, in Nicastro and its surroundings sericulture was a very widespread and prosperous activity, so much so that five thousand pounds of raw silk were produced every year. According to the historian Giuseppe Maria Galanti, at the end of the 18th century, sericulture alongside the cultivation of mulberry trees for the breeding of silkworms were still practiced, however there was a remarkable decline in the production.

Nicastro experienced the highest rate of emigration during the late 19th and the early 20th century (some 8,000 citizens), as well as after the Second World War.

=== Sambiase ===
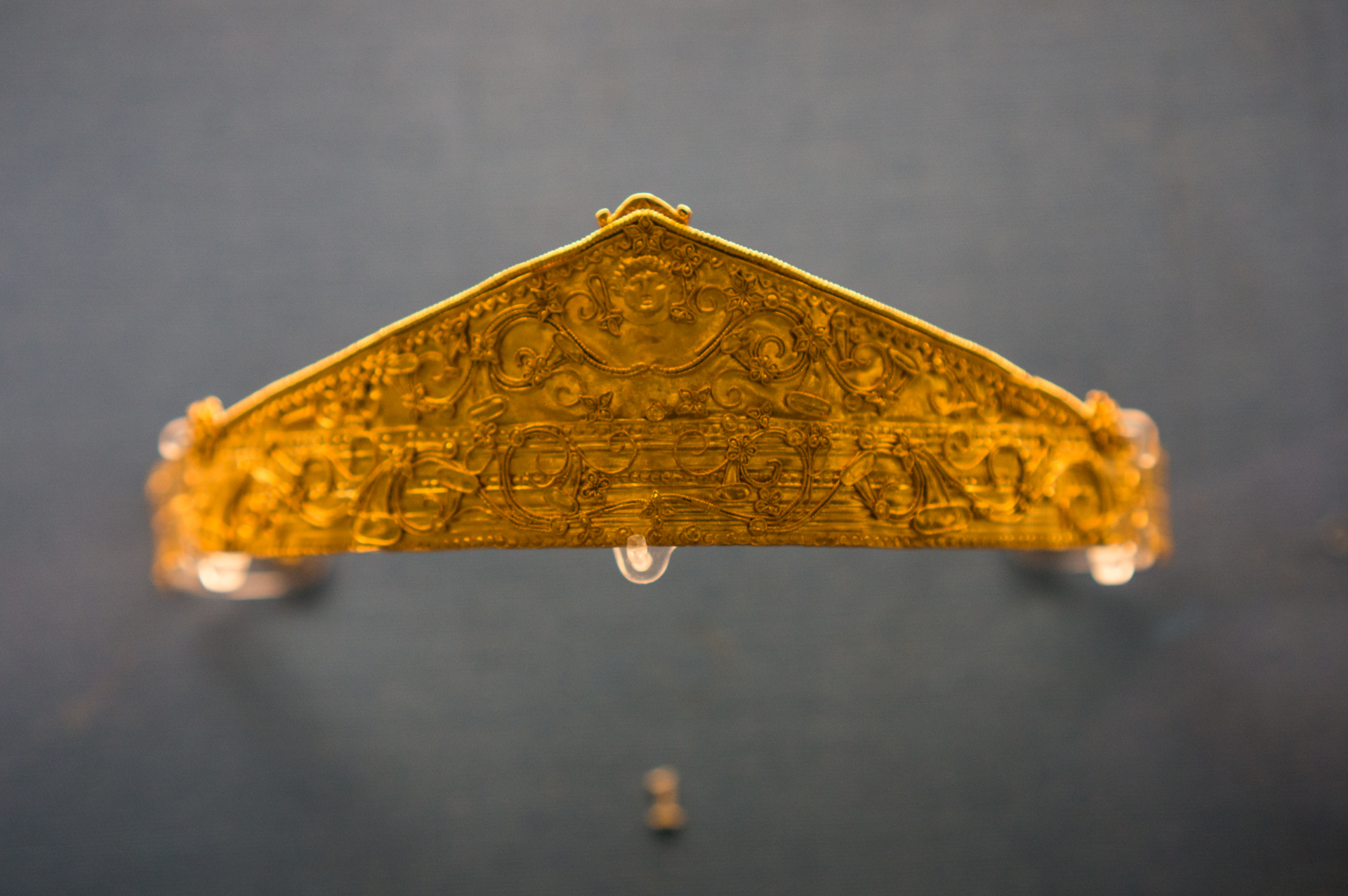
Gold diadem from the Sant'Eufemia Treasure in the British Museum

The baths of Sambiase are mentioned in the Roman itinerary Tabula Peutingeriana, indicating the village was an important destination of the time. A library edition of the map is kept at the Lamezia Terme Town Library in Lamezia Terme in its historical and specialist section, the Casa del Libro Antico (House of the Ancient Book).

But Sambiase already existed during the ancient Greek period, first with the name of Melea (here they are placed in fact its ancient boundaries), and then Terina (of which numerous coins have been found again in the fraction Acquafredda and also the Sant'Eufemia Treasure preserved in the British Museum). With the fall of the ancient Roman empire, Turres was abandoned and devastated by the Ostrogoths.

Notable figures born in Sambiase include the politician Giovanni Nicotera, the philosopher Francesco Fiorentino, and the poet [Franco Costabile].

=== Sant'Eufemia Lamezia ===
The current Sant'Eufemia Lamezia corresponds to the ancient city location. The most ancient settlement was the Greek city of Terina, whose ruins were excavated in 1997. The city of Terina is linked to the myth of Ligea, one of the three Sirens of Homer's Odyssey. Ancient coins have been found, on which Ligea's face is imprinted, in some she is sitting on a stone, while playing ball and in others she appears filling an amphora with the water, coming out of a lion's mouth.

Other material evidence of the presence of an ancient settlement in the area of Sant'Eufemia dates back to 1865, when a gold diadem and a treasure of jewels of the 4th century BC were found by chance. At the end of the same century, it was sold to the British Museum of London, where it is still preserved today.

Sant'Eufemia Lamezia (nowadays Sant'Eufemia Vetere) was created upon a hill not long after the 1638 earthquake. The current quarter was built in the Fascist era after the draining of a marshy area.

== Geography ==
Lamezia is located on the eastern border of the coastal plain commonly called Piana di Sant'Eufemia, which was created by draining a wide marshy area.

The municipality borders with Conflenti, Curinga, Falerna, Feroleto Antico, Gizzeria, Maida, Martirano Lombardo, Nocera Terinese, Platania, San Pietro a Maida and Serrastretta.

=== Climate ===
Climate data for Lamezia Terme (1991–2020)
| Month | Jan | Feb | Mar | Apr | May | Jun | Jul | Aug | Sep | Oct | Nov | Dec | Year |
|---|---|---|---|---|---|---|---|---|---|---|---|---|---|
| Mean daily maximum °C (°F) | 14.4 (57.9) | 14.5 (58.1) | 16.4 (61.5) | 18.8 (65.8) | 22.7 (72.9) | 26.6 (79.9) | 29.0 (84.2) | 29.9 (85.8) | 27.1 (80.8) | 23.6 (74.5) | 19.4 (66.9) | 15.7 (60.3) | 21.5 (70.7) |
| Daily mean °C (°F) | 9.9 (49.8) | 9.8 (49.6) | 11.7 (53.1) | 14.1 (57.4) | 17.9 (64.2) | 21.8 (71.2) | 24.2 (75.6) | 24.8 (76.6) | 21.9 (71.4) | 18.5 (65.3) | 14.6 (58.3) | 11.1 (52.0) | 16.7 (62.0) |
| Mean daily minimum °C (°F) | 5.3 (41.5) | 5.1 (41.2) | 6.9 (44.4) | 9.4 (48.9) | 13.2 (55.8) | 16.9 (62.4) | 19.4 (66.9) | 19.8 (67.6) | 16.6 (61.9) | 13.5 (56.3) | 9.8 (49.6) | 6.5 (43.7) | 11.9 (53.4) |
| Average precipitation mm (inches) | 90 (3.5) | 109 (4.3) | 79 (3.1) | 68 (2.7) | 37 (1.5) | 21 (0.8) | 12 (0.5) | 18 (0.7) | 37 (1.5) | 100 (3.9) | 101 (4.0) | 97 (3.8) | 769 (30.3) |
Source 1: Istituto Superiore per la Protezione e la Ricerca Ambientale
Source 2: Il Meteo (precipitation)

== Demographics ==
Historical population
| Year | Pop. | ±% |
|---|---|---|
| 1861 | 18,282 | — |
| 1871 | 21,226 | +16.1% |
| 1881 | 22,847 | +7.6% |
| 1901 | 29,372 | +28.6% |
| 1911 | 30,167 | +2.7% |
| 1921 | 35,381 | +17.3% |
| 1931 | 40,298 | +13.9% |
| 1936 | 41,627 | +3.3% |
| 1951 | 52,180 | +25.4% |
| 1961 | 53,738 | +3.0% |
| 1971 | 56,018 | +4.2% |
| 1981 | 63,989 | +14.2% |
| 1991 | 70,114 | +9.6% |
| 2001 | 70,501 | +0.6% |
| 2011 | 70,336 | −0.2% |
| 2021 | 67,413 | −4.2% |
Source: ISTAT

As of 2026, the population is 67,005, of which 49.6% are male, and 50.4% are female. Minors make up 15.9% of the population, and seniors make up 23.0%.

=== Immigration ===
As of 2025, immigrants make up 9.7% of the population. The 5 largest foreign countries of birth are Morocco, Romania, Ukraine, Bangladesh, and Switzerland.

== Main sights ==
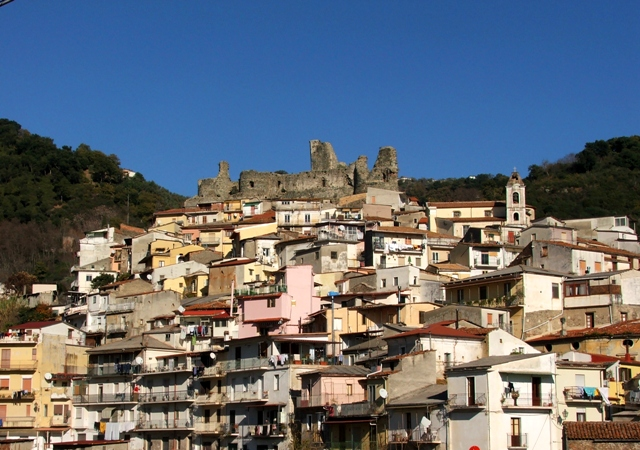
District San Teodoro with Norman-Swabian castle

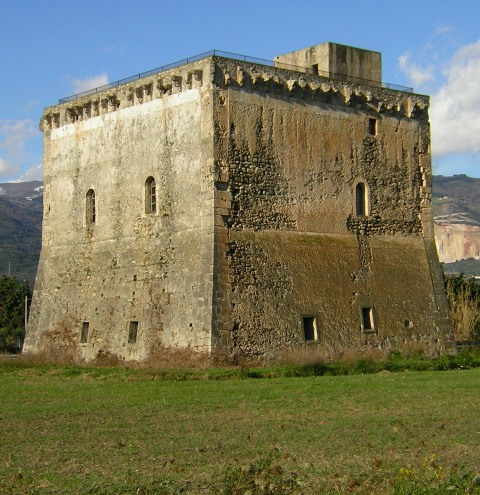
The Bastion of Malta in Lamezia (1550)

- The Castle is today an ensemble of ruins occupying the summit of a hill 320 metres (1,050 ft) high. It was built, according to some scholars, by the Bruttii or by Greek colonists. The current structure dates probably from the Norman domination, although some structure existed at the time of the Ostrogoth king Teia. In 1122 Pope Callixtus II resided here for 15 days. Later, the castle was enlarged by Constance of Hauteville and his son Frederick II, as well as by the Angevines. The castle was heavily damaged by the earthquakes of 1609, 1638 and 1783, and subsequently abandoned.
- The San Teodoro old district is the heart of Nicastro's historic centre: the alleys lead to numerous little churches, finally culminating in the remains of the Norman-Swabian castle, in the highest part of the town. This spot offers a view towards the Gulf of Saint Euphemia.
- The Bastion of the Knights of Malta is a massive, well-preserved watchtower built in 1550 by the Spanish viceroy of Naples Pedro de Toledo. It was assigned to the Knights, who had a fief in the neighbourhood. Ruins of several other watchtowers are in the area.
- Near Sant'Eufemia, the ruins of the Cistercian abbey of Santa Maria di Corazzo can be seen. It was founded around 1060. Joachim of Fiore was an abbot here, and Bernardino Telesio wrote many of his philosophical works here in 1554.
- The Lametino Archaeological Museum houses archaeological finds from surveys, excavations and fortuitous discoveries carried out in the so-called Lamezia plain. The Museum is divided into three sections: Prehistoric, Classical and Medieval. One of the most important finds is an ancient Greek red-figure hydria of the 4th century BC, depicting a gynaeceum scene.
- D'Ippolito Palace, in Nicastro, is one of the most famous buildings of Lamezia Terme, which was built around 1763, when nobleman Felice d'Ippolito acquired a number of buildings. The 18th century complex is an expression of the late southern Baroque. Designed to respond the need for representation and domestic life, the architectural complex has four horizontal levels and specific detached premises. The palace stands out for its architectural quality and conservation. It features a rich stucco decoration of the facade, which in some way assimilates with Austrian and Hungarian architecture. The entrance hall depicts the heraldic coat of arms of the Ippolito family.
- The Bronze Statue of King Frederick II as he handles the falcon, with his face and the index pointed towards the ruins of the Norman Swabian castle, symbol of the political and administrative power that the city had during his reign.
- The abbey of the 40 Martyrs (Lamezia Terme – Sambiase), created in the 9th–10th century, is still active.
- The Diocesan Museum houses an Arab-Norman ivory case (12th century), paintings of 17th–18th centuries and other works.
- Eco-museum of Lamezia Terme in Sambiase.
- The Textile Museum of Lamezia Terme collects tools linked to the ancient craft of weaving, hosts an exhibition space and a workshop.
- There are numerous churches of Sambiase di Lamezia Terme. The most important is Saint Pancrazio's church where there are some of Mattia Preti's pictures, fantastic statues and frescoes. It was a symbol of the new Sambiase in the 18th century.

== Economy ==
=== Agriculture ===
Lamezia Terme has a deep-rooted agricultural tradition, known for the production of different varieties of typical Mediterranean crops. The most popular productions are:

- the olive tree, mainly of the Carolea variety, from which the Lametia DOP olive oil with a typical strong taste is produced;
- the grape vine, from which excellent wines are produced including six Lamezia DOC wines: Lamezia white, Lamezia rosato, Lamezia red, Lamezia novello, Lamezia red reserve and Lamezia Greco;
- chestnut and beech;
- various herbaceous plants such as wheat, oats, and maize;
- different species of citrus fruits, including the renowned clementines of Calabria PDO.

=== Industry ===
The "Papa Benedetto XVI" industrial area covers an area of about 1,100 hectares and is the largest of the South after the one in Bagnoli. The typical industry produces local red clay pottery.

== Sport ==
Vigor Lamezia is the local football team, currently playing at a regional level.

== Transport ==
The central location of Lamezia Terme in Calabria has made it the main transport hub of the region. The city is situated adjacent to the A2 Salerno-Reggio Calabria Motorway, and the state road 288 runs to Catanzaro from Lamezia.

The central railway station, on the main line leading from Reggio to Naples, is a major terminal for goods traffic. Secondary branches connect to Catanzaro and Crotone.

Lamezia is the site of the Lamezia Terme International Airport, built in 1976. The airport has both national and international connections.

== Notable people ==
- Francesco Fiorentino (1834–1884), philosopher
- Felice Natalino (born 1992), footballer
- Giovanni Nicotera (1828–1894), patriot and politician
- Carlo Rambaldi (1925–2012), special effects expert

== See also ==
- Calabrian wine
- Vigor Lamezia
