= Visentium =

Coordinates: 42.574°N 11.875°E

Visentium (also spelled Bisentium, Italian Bisenzio) was the Latin name of one of the minor Etruscan cities. It was a boundary settlement on the southwestern shore of the Lago di Bolsena and was settled from the Final Bronze Age until the Archaic period.

The Etruscan name for Visentium was Vesnth, or Vishnth. It was called Visentium after the settlement was conquered by the Romans in 280 B.C. During the Classical period, it fell under the orbit of the city of Tarquinia. The artifacts such as urns and other grave goods excavated from its various necropoleis are said to indicate its importance during the Iron Age and the Orientalizing period. These provided insights on the settlers' dwellings and perishable belongings, which augmented their pottery and metal works. The artifacts, particularly, the bronze objects also suggest that Visentium was influenced by Vulci.

== Legacy ==
The Italianized 'modern' form Bisenzio gave its name to:

- a Tuscan river, the Bisenzio;
- a medieval Latin bishopric, which soon was renamed Roman Catholic Diocese of Castro del Lazio.
