= Roman Catholic Diocese of Castro del Lazio =

The Roman Catholic Diocese of Castro del Lazio was a residential bishopric from 600 to 1649 and is now a Latin Catholic titular see under the shortened name Castro.

== History ==
The bishopric was founded in 600 AD under the name Bisenzio (Latin Bisentium), the Italianized medieval name of the Ancient Etruscan city Visentium.

In 680 it was renamed as Diocese of Castro del Lazio, also called Castrum in Tuscia.

On 31 August 1369, it lost territory to establish the Roman Catholic Diocese of Montefiascone.

On 13 September 1649, it was suppressed and its territory used to establish the Roman Catholic Diocese of Acquapendente.

=== Bishops ===
- Bishop Rolando (1206? – 1207?)
- Ruggero Calcagnini, Dominican Order (O.P.) (1244? – 1253?)
- Angelo (1274 – ?)
- Ermanno (1278.07.18 – ?)
- Corrado da Montefiascone, O.P. (? – death 1285?)
- Bernardo (1285.04.24 – ?), previously Bishop of Numana (1280.05.15 – 1285.04.24)
- Gaetano Baliganto (? – 1296?)
- Rufino (1296.08.09 – ?), previously Bishop of Montemarano (1290? – 1296.08.09)
- Pietro (1308.04.07 – death 1309)
- Giacomo (1309.04.11 – 1311.05.14), later Bishop of Nola (Italy) (1311.05.14 – ?)
- Gregorio Bonfili, Augustinians (O.E.S.A.) (1311.05.09 – death 1321)
- Pietro, O.E.S.A. (1322.01.08 – ?)
- Giacomo, Friars Minor (O.F.M.) (1331.01.30 – 1352)
- Stefano (1353.01.18 – 1363.01.01)
- Paolo Guiducci (1364.04.22 – ?)
- Giovanni Cambaruti (1373.07.18 – 1377 deposed)
- Angelo Gozzadini (1380 – death1383)
- Giovanni (1384 – ?)
- Benedetto (1394.04.11 – death 1395)
- (vacancy?)
- Giovanni (1401? – ?)
- Pietro Santo, O.E.S.A. (1420.01.15 – ?), previously Bishop of Skradin (1410.07.30 – 1420.01.15)
- Angelo (1429.05.09 – death 1437)
- Marco Cobello (1437.12.11 – ?)
- Antonio (1463.03.31 – 1467.10.30), later Bishop of Civita Castellana e Orte (Italy) (1467.10.30 – death 1473.10.10)
- Daniele da Forlì, O.F.M. (1467.10.30 – ?)
- Giacomo Romanesci, O.F.M. (1468.05.04 – ?)
- Michael da Viterbo (1469.08.18 – 1478?)
- Tito Veltri de Viterbo (1480.11.10 – 1511.04.30)
- Giorgio Uberti (1518.04.12 – 1528)
- Leone Leonici (1529.08.20 – 1532)
- Francesco Boscheni (1532.04.17 – death 1535)
- Lodovico Magnasco di Santa Fiora (1535.10.20 – 1543.07.06), later Bishop of Assisi (Italy) (1543.07.06 – 1552)
- Girolamo Maccabei de Toscanella (1543.07.06 – 1568))
- Francesco Cittadini (1568.11.19 – 1581.01 deposed)
- Celso Paci (1581.01.13 – death 1591.05.07)
- Lorenzo Celsi (bishop) (1591.07.19 – death 1603)
- Giovanni Ambrogio Caccia (1603.02.26 – 1611)
- Alessandro Rossi (bishop of Parma) (1611.01.31 – death 1614.07.09), later Bishop of Parma (Italy) (1614.07.09 – 1615.03.24)
- Antonio Massa (1614.11.24 – death 1616.10.31)
- Ireneo Brasavola, O.F.M. (1617.01.09 – death 1621)
- Alessandro Carissimi (1621.12.15 – death 1631.09)
- Pompeo Balbani (1632.01.19 – death 1639)
- Alberto Giunti (1640.09.10 – death 1648)
- Cristoforo Pietro Antonio Giarda, B. (1648.05.18 – death 1649.03.18)

== Titular see ==
The bishopric was nominally restored in 1698, under he shortened name Castro, or Castrum in Tuscia in Latin.

- Titular Archbishop Edgard Aristide Maranta, Capuchin Friars Minor O.F.M. Cap. (1968.12.19 – 1975.01.29)
- Titular Bishop Estanislao Esteban Karlic (1977.06.06 – 1983.01.19), as Auxiliary Bishop of Córdoba (Argentina) (1977.06.06 – 1983.01.19), later Coadjutor Archbishop of Paraná (Argentina) (1983.01.19 – 1986.04.01), then Apostolic Administrator sede plena of Paraná (1983.01.19 – 1986.04.01) and succeeding as Metropolitan Archbishop of Paraná (Argentina) (1986.04.01 – 2003.04.29), President of Episcopal Conference of Argentina (1996 – 2002), created Cardinal-Priest of Beata Maria Addolorata a piazza Buenos Aires (2007.11.24 [2008.02.02] – ...)
- Titular Bishop Juan Antonio Ugarte Pérez (1983.08.18 – 1997.03.15), as Auxiliary Bishop of Abancay (Peru) (1983.08.18 – 1986.10.18), later Auxiliary Bishop of Cusco (Peru) (1986.10.18 – 1991.12.04), Auxiliary Bishop of Yauyos (Peru) (1991.12.04 – 1997.03.15), succeeding as Bishop-Prelate of Yauyos (Peru) (1997.03.15 – 2003.11.29), later Metropolitan Archbishop of Cusco (Peru) (2003.11.29 – 2014.10.28)
- Titular Bishop Rimantas Norvila (1997.05.28 – 2002.01.05)
- Titular Bishop Patrick K. Lynch, Picpus Fathers (SS.CC.) (2005.12.28 – ...), Auxiliary Bishop of Southwark (London, England)

== See also ==
- List of Catholic dioceses in Italy
- Castro for (near-)namesakes, including two fellow Latin titular sees, both in southern Italy :
  - the former Roman Catholic Diocese of Castro di Puglia in Apulia
  - the former Roman Catholic Diocese of Castro di Sardegna on Sardinia
- Catholic Church in Italy

== Sources and external links ==
- GigaCatholic, with incumbent biography links - date for all sections
