= Roman Catholic Diocese of Teano =

The Diocese of Teano (Latin: Dioecesis Theanensis) was a Roman Catholic diocese in Italy, located in the city of Teano in the province of Caserta in Campania, Italy. In 1818, it was united the Diocese of Calvi Risorta to form the Diocese of Calvi e Teano. In 1986, the two dioceses were combined into one, with the seat of the bishop at Teano.

== History ==
Teano is a former fief of the Gaetani. Its first bishop was supposedly Paris of Teano (d. 346), ordained by Pope Sylvester I; according to tradition, Saint Urbanus and Saint Amasius were bishops of Teano in the fourth century.

=== Concordat of 1818 ===
Following the extinction of the Napoleonic Kingdom of Italy, the Congress of Vienna authorized the restoration of the Papal States and the Kingdom of Naples. Since the French occupation had seen the abolition of many Church institutions in the Kingdom, as well as the confiscation of most Church property and resources, it was imperative that Pope Pius VII and King Ferdinand IV reach agreement on restoration and restitution. Ferdinand, however, was not prepared to accept the pre-Napoleonic situation, in which Naples was a feudal subject of the papacy. Lengthy, detailed, and acrimonious negotiations ensued.

In 1818, a new concordat with the Kingdom of the Two Sicilies committed the pope to the suppression of more than fifty small dioceses in the kingdom. The ecclesiastical province of Naples was spared from any suppressions, but the province of Capua was affected. Pope Pius VII, in the bull "De Utiliori" of 27 June 1818, chose to unite the two dioceses of Calvi and Teano under the leadership of one bishop, aeque principaliter, that is, one and the same bishop was bishop of both dioceses at the same time.

=== Diocese of Teano-Calvi ===
On 18 February 1984, the Vatican and the Italian State signed a new and revised concordat, which was accompanied in the next year by enabling legislation. According to the agreement, the practice of having one bishop govern two separate dioceses at the same time, aeque personaliter, was abolished. Otherwise Calvi and Teano might have continued to share a bishop. Instead, the Vatican continued consultations which had begun under Pope John XXIII for the merging of small dioceses, especially those with personnel and financial problems, into one combined diocese. On 30 September 1986, Pope John Paul II ordered that the dioceses of Calvi and Teano be merged into one diocese with one bishop, with the Latin title Dioecesis Theanensis-Calvensis. The seat of the diocese was to be in Teano, and the cathedral of Teano was to serve as the cathedral of the merged diocese. The cathedral in Calvi was to become a co-cathedral, and its cathedral Chapter was to be a Capitulum Concathedralis. There was to be only one diocesan Tribunal, in Teano, and likewise one seminary, one College of Consultors, and one Priests' Council. The territory of the new diocese was to include the territory of the former dioceses of Calvi and of Teano.

== Bishops of Teano ==
=== to 1300 ===
Paris (c. 314–346)
Amasius (c. 346–355)
Urbanus

- Quintus (c. 499)

...

- Domninus (ca. 555–560)

...
Maurus ? ( ? )

...

- Lupus, O.S.B. (d. 860)
- Hilarius, O.S.B. (860–after 867)
- Stephanus (attested in 868)
- Leo (879, 887/888)
- Angelarius, O.S.B. (ca. 886–889)

...

- Landus (attested 987)

...

- Sandarius (c. 1004–1009)

...

- Arduinus (attested 1059)

...

- Pandulfus, O.S.B. (attested 1122)
- Petrus (ca. 1171–1192)
- Theodinus (1193–1227)
- Roffredus (attested 1229–1239)
- Hugo
- Guilelmus
- Nicolaus

=== since 1300 ===
- Adenulfus (c. 1305)
- Giffredus de Gallutio
- Petrus
- Homodeus
- Bartholomaeus (1348–1353)
- Marinus de Judice (1353–1361)
- Joannes Mutio (1361–1363)
- Francesco de Messana, O.P. (1363–1369)
- Thomas de Porta (1369–1382)
- Alexander
- Antonius (attested 1383–1393) Roman Obedience
- Joannes de Ebulo ( –1388) Avignon Obedience
- Nicolaus Diano (1393–1412) Roman Obedience

Gasparus de Diano (1412–1418)

- Joannes Crispani (1418–1443)
- Martinus Pales de Belinzo (1443–1458)
- Cardinal Nicolaus Fortiguerra (1458–1473)
- Orso Orsini (1474–1495)
- Francisco de Borja (19 Aug 1495 - 5 Jun 1508 Resigned)
- Francisco Borja (5 Jul 1508 - 1531 Resigned)
- Giovanni Salviati (21 Jun 1531 - 30 Apr 1535 Resigned)
- Antonio Maria Sartori (30 Apr 1535 - 1556)
- Girolamo Michele Nichesola, O.P. (11 Jan 1557 - Aug 1566)
- Archangelo de' Bianchi (Blanca), O.P. (16 Sep 1566 - Sep 1575 Resigned)
- Giovanni Paolo Marincola (18 Sep 1575 - 1588 Resigned)
- Vincenzo Brancaleoni (9 Mar 1588 - Aug 1588)
- Vincenzo Serafino (3 Oct 1588 - 1615)
- Angelo della Ciaja (24 Feb 1616 - Nov 1616)
- Miguel Angel Zaragoza Heredia (27 Feb 1617 - Aug 1622)
- Ovidio Lupari (9 Jan 1623 - 1626)
- Juan de Guevara, C.R.M. (22 Mar 1627 - Aug 1641)
- Muzio de Rosis (14 Jul 1642 - Sep 1654)
- Paolo Squillanti (7 Dec 1654 - 2 Jan 1660)
- Ottavio Boldoni, (15 Nov 1660 - Feb 1680)
- Giuseppe Nicola Gilberti (12 May 1681 - 29 Nov 1697 Resigned)
- Domenico Pacifico (27 Jan 1698 - Sep 1717)
- Giuseppe del Pozzo (11 Feb 1718 - Aug 1723)
- Domenico Antonio Cirillo (14 Feb 1724 - Aug 1745)
- Angelo Longo, O.S.B. (9 Mar 1746 - 19 Oct 1749)
- Domenico Giordani (1 Dec 1749 - 7 Jul 1755 Resigned)
- Agnellus Broya (17 Nov 1755 - Nov 1767)
- Giovanni Giacomo Onorati (25 Jan 1768 - 12 May 1777 Appointed, Bishop of Troia)
- Filippo d’Aprile (23 Jun 1777 - 27 Feb 1792 Confirmed, Bishop of Melfi e Rapolla)
- Raffaele Pasca, O.S.B. (26 Mar 1792 - 1795)
- Nicola Vecchi (18 Dec 1797 - 1808)

== Books ==
=== Reference works ===
- Gams, Pius Bonifatius (1873). Series episcoporum Ecclesiae catholicae: quotquot innotuerunt a beato Petro apostolo. Ratisbon: Typis et Sumptibus Georgii Josephi Manz. p. 864-865 (Calvi); 930-931 (Teano).
- Eubel, Conradus, ed. (1913). Hierarchia catholica, Tomus 1 (second ed.). Münster: Libreria Regensbergiana. p. 159 (Calvi); 480-481 (Teano). (in Latin)
- Eubel, Conradus, ed. (1914). Hierarchia catholica, Tomus 2 (second ed.). Münster: Libreria Regensbergiana. p. 243. (in Latin)
- Gulik, Guilelmus (1923). Eubel, Conradus (ed.). Hierarchia catholica, Tomus 3 (second ed.). Münster: Libreria Regensbergiana. p. 305. (in Latin)
- Gauchat, Patritius (Patrice) (1935). Hierarchia catholica IV (1592-1667). Münster: Libraria Regensbergiana. p. 324. (in Latin)
- Ritzler, Remigius; Sefrin, Pirminus (1952). Hierarchia catholica medii et recentis aevi V (1667-1730). Patavii: Messagero di S. Antonio. pp. 137–138 (Calvi); 373 (Teano).
- Ritzler, Remigius; Sefrin, Pirminus (1958). Hierarchia catholica medii et recentis aevi VI (1730-1799). Patavii: Messagero di S. Antonio. p. 399 (Teano).
- Ritzler, Remigius; Sefrin, Pirminus (1968). Hierarchia Catholica medii et recentioris aevi (in Latin). Vol. VII (1800–1846). Monasterii: Libreria Regensburgiana.
- Remigius Ritzler; Pirminus Sefrin (1978). Hierarchia catholica Medii et recentioris aevi (in Latin). Vol. VIII (1846–1903). Il Messaggero di S. Antonio.
- Pięta, Zenon (2002). Hierarchia catholica medii et recentioris aevi (in Latin). Vol. IX (1903–1922). Padua: Messagero di San Antonio. ISBN 978-88-250-1000-8.

=== Studies ===
- Broccoli, Michele (1822). Teano Sidicino, antico, e moderno (in Italian). Vol. Parte III. Napoli: Presso P. Tizzano.
- Cappelletti, Giuseppe (1866). Le chiese d'Italia della loro origine sino ai nostri giorni (in Italian). Vol. vigesimo (20). Venezia: Giuseppe Antonelli. pp. 182–213.
- D'Avino, Vincenzo (1848). Cenni storici sulle chiese arcivescovili, vescovili, e prelatizie (nullius) del Regno delle Due Sicilie (in Italian). dalle stampe di Ranucci. pp. 660-662.
- Lanzoni, Francesco (1927). Le diocesi d'Italia dalle origini al principio del secolo VII (an. 604). Faenza: F. Lega. (in Italian)
- Ughelli, Ferdinando; Coleti, Niccolo (1720). Italia Sacra Sive De Episcopis Italiae (in Latin). Vol. Tomus sextus (6). Venezia: Coleti. pp. 477–483 (Calvi), 196–215 (Teano).
