= Diocese of Lamezia Terme =

Latin Catholic diocese in Italy

Coordinates: 38.9667°N 16.3000°E

Diocese of Lamezia Terme Dioecesis Neocastrensis

Catholic
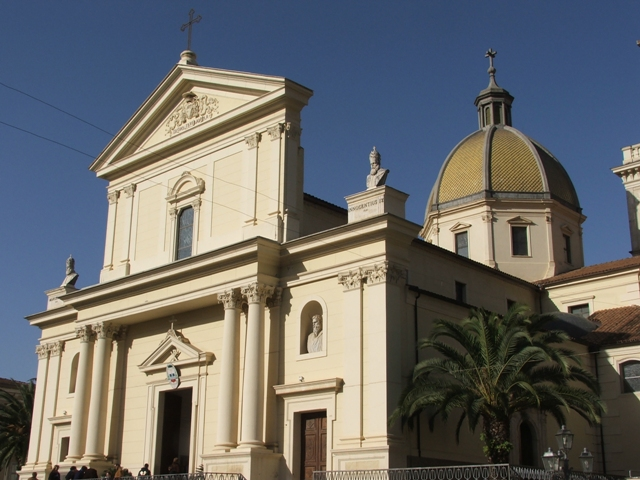
- Cathedral of Lamezia Terme

Location
- Country: Italy
- Ecclesiastical province: Catanzaro-Squillace

Statistics
- Area: 915 km^{2} (353 sq mi)
- Population: Total; Catholics: (as of 2023); 133,100 (est.) ▼; 128,200 (guess)
- Parishes: 63

Information
- Denomination: Catholic Church
- Sui iuris church: Latin Church
- Rite: Roman Rite
- Established: 11th Century
- Cathedral: Cattedrale di Ss. Pietro e Paolo
- Secular priests: 79 (diocesan) ▲29 (Religious Orders); 18 Permanent Deacons ▲

Current leadership
- Pope: Leo XIV
- Bishop: Serafino Parisi
- Bishops emeritus: Vincenzo Rimedio

Map

Website
- Diocese of Lamezia Terme (in Italian)

The Diocese of Lamezia Terme (Latin: Dioecesis Neocastrensis) is a Latin Church diocese of the Catholic Church in Calabria. In 1818 the ancient see of Martirano, the former Mamertum (the first bishop of which was Domnus, in 761), was united to the diocese of Nicastro. The diocese was then a suffragan of the archdiocese of Reggio in Calabria. In 1986, the historic Diocese of Nicastro had its name changed. It is currently called the Diocese of Lamezia Terme, and it is a suffragan of the Archdiocese of Catanzaro-Squillace. The name change reflects the incorporation of the comune of Nicastro into Lamezia Terme, an administrative change of 1968 on the part of the State of Italy.

== History ==
The earliest appearance of the name Nicastro is in the Diatyposis (Νέα Τακτικά) of Leo the Wise, composed at Constantinople around 900. Nicastro is listed twelfth and last among the bishops of the Greek Metropolitanate of Reggio Calabria. For a long time, the Greek Rite was in use at Nicastro.

The church in the village below the citadel of Nicastro was built and endowed by the Norman Aumberga, the niece of Robert Guiscard and sister of Count Richard Dapifer, the son of Drago. It became the Cathedral of St Peter. In 1101, Count Richard the Dapifer transferred to the diocese of Nicastro property and chattels which had belonged to Aumberga in the territory between Agarena and Nicastro. The first bishop of this city of whom there is any record was Henricus (1094), who is mentioned in the donation. Among the ten subscribers to the charter are Archbishop Robert of Reggio Calabria and Bishop Sasso of Cassano, who was serving as Papal Vicar in Calabria for Pope Paschal II.

Pope Calixtus II visited Nicastro on 9 December 1121, on his way from Taranto to Catanzaro.

Bishop Tancredo da Monte Foscolo (1279–1290) was deposed by Pope Nicholas IV for having consecrated James II of Sicily, but he was reinstated by Pope Boniface VIII.

In 1638 a major earthquake struck Calabria. Nicastro was very severely hit. All the buildings were damaged or destroyed, and some 1200 people lost their lives. At Martirano the death toll was 517. The old cathedral of Nicastro, built by the generosity of Aumberga, was destroyed by the earthquake. A new cathedral was erected in a more expansive location by Bishop Perrone. The cathedral was served by a Chapter composed, in 1680, of six dignities and fourteen Canons. The dignities were: the Dean, the Archdeacon, the Cantor, the Treasurer, the Cappellanus Major, and the Penitentiary; the Cappellanus Major was pastor of the cathedral parish. In 1773 there were seven dignities and twenty-four Canons. The town had three other parishes besides the Cathedral: S. Teodoro (governed by the Archdeacon), Santa Maria Maggiore, and Santa Lucia.

In Nicastro there was a convent of the Franciscans, founded in 1400 by the Conventual Franciscans and dedicated to S. Maria della Grazia; it was taken over by the Observant Franciscans and then in 1594 by the Reformed Franciscans. There was also a convent of the Dominicans, established in 1502 and dedicated to the Annunciation; it was made a stadium generale by Father General Niccolò Ridolfi. The Capuchins established the convent of S. Maria degli Angeli in 1545; provincial chapters of the Order met there in 1550, 1556 and 1618. All three were suppressed in 1809 and converted into other uses.

=== Change of diocesan name ===
In 1968, the government of the Italian Republic annexed the town of Nicastro to the city of Lamezia. In 1985, following the signing of a revised concordat with the Italian Republic, the Vatican Secretary of State issued a set of instructions (Normae) for implementing some of its provisions, "so that the names [of dioceses] might be more appropriately accommodated to new circumstances, and better respond to the current necessities of civil and social life." On 27 September 1986, after appropriate consultations, Pope John Paul II granted permission to the Congregation of Bishops to implement the norms. In the case of Nicastro, the Congregation issued a decree on 30 September 1986, in which the long-standing name of "Neocastrenses" was retained for business of the Curia (i.e. for ecclesiastical matters), but in the vernacular it was to be referred to as "Diocesi di Lamezia Terme".

== Bishops ==
=== Diocese of Nicastro ===
Latin Name: Neocastrensis
Metropolitan: Archdiocese of Reggio Calabria

==== to 1300 ====
...

- Henricus (attested 1094 – 1122)
- Guido (attested 1168 – 1179)
- Bohemund (attested 21 October 1194, 1195, 1199)
- Rogerius (attested 1202)

...

- Thaddeus (attested 1222)
- Urso (attested 1239, 1240)
- Gualterius de Cusencia
- Samuel, O.Min. (attested 1252 – 1255)
- Bernardus (attested 1256 – 1258)
- Leonardus (15 October 1266 – after September 1272)
- Robertus (1274–1275 – before 6 March 1279)
- Tancredus de Montefusculo, O.Min. (15 May 1279 – 1290)

==== 1300 to 1500 ====
- Nicolaus, O.S.B. (6 November 1299 – 1320?)
- Petrus, O.Min. (21 June 1320 – ?)
- Ambrosius (7 March 1323 – 1333)
- Joannes de Preston, O.Min. (30 July 1333 – )
- Nicolaus (attested 1344)
- Jacobus (Avignon Obedience)
- Carlucius Cicala (Avignon Obedience)
- Manfred (Roman Obedience)
- Angelo (Roman Obedience)
- Giuliano, O.Min. (28 January 1388 – )
- Giacomo, O.Min. (2 April 1390 – )
- Roberto Mazza (4 May 1394 – )
- Giacomo (1398)
- Gentile d'Ajello (13 January 1399 – after 5 April 1409)
- Angelo de Benevento (9 May 1409 – )
- Paolo (1418–1431)
- Joannes de Paganis (28 May 1431 – 1451)
- Robertus (8 October 1451 – 1473?)
- Antonius (26 November 1473 – 1488?)
- Petrus de Sonino (26 January 1489 – 1490?)
- Antonius Lucido (8 February 1490 – 1494)
- Bartolomeo de Luna (29 July 1495 – 26 October 1497)
- Franciscus de Roccamura (27 October 1497 – 1504)

==== 1500 to 1600 ====
- Niccolò Capranica (18 December 1504 – 1517)

- Cardinal Franciotto Orsini (18 Sep 1517 – 5 May 1518 Resigned) (Administrator)
- Cardinal Andrea della Valle (5 May 1518 – 17 May 1518 Resigned) (Administrator)

- Antonio de Paula (17 May 1518 – 24 July 1523)
- Geronimo de Paula (24 July 1523 – 9 May 1530)
- Giovanni Pietro Ricci (24 May–?, 1530)

- Cardinal Andrea della Valle (1530–1533) (Administrator)

- Nicola Regitano (3 Mar–Sep, 1533 Died)
- Paolo Capizucchi (7 Nov 1533 – 6 Aug 1539 Died)
- Marcello Cervini (27 Aug 1539 – 24 Sep 1540) (Administrator)

- Cardinal Giacomo Savelli (5 Nov 1540 – 19 Nov 1554 Resigned) (Administrator)

- Mariano Savelli (19 Nov 1554 – 6 Feb 1556 Resigned) (Administrator)

- Cardinal Giacomo Savelli (6 Feb 1556 – 26 Jan 1560 Resigned) (Administrator)

- Giovanni Antonio Facchinetti de Nuce (26 Jan 1560 – 23 Sep 1575 Resigned)
- Ferdinando Spinelli (23 Sep 1575 – 4 Dec 1581)
- Alessandro Ravalio (26 Jan 1582 – 1585 Died)
- Clemente Bontodasio, O.F.M. Conv. (23 Jun 1586 – 1594 Died)

==== 1600 to 1800 ====
- Pietro Francesco Montorio (7 Feb 1594 – 1620 Resigned))
- Ferdinando Confalone (19 Apr 1621 – 1624 Died)
- Baldassarre Bolognetti, O.S.M. (11 Mar 1624 – Sep 1629 Died)
- Alessandro Castracani (Castracane) (8 Oct 1629 – 22 Jun 1632 Resigned)
- Giovan Battista Curiale (Correale) (5 Jul 1632 – 1634 Died)
- Domenico Ravenna (12 Feb 1635 – Jul 1637 Died)
- Marco Antonio Mandosio (7 Sep 1637 – Aug 1638 Died)
- Giovanni Tommaso Perrone (11 Apr 1639 – 16 Nov 1677 Died)
- Francesco Tansi (22 Jan 1680 – 3 May 1692 Died)
- Nicola Cirillo (7 Jul 1692 – 23 Jan 1709 Died)
- Giovanni Carafa, C.R. (8 Jun 1718 – 17 Aug 1719 Died)
- Domenico Angeletti (2 Oct 1719 – 21 Apr 1731 Died)
- Francesco Maria Loyero (6 Aug 1731 – 24 Dec 1736 Died)
- Achille Puglia (11 Feb 1737 – 5 Feb 1773 Died)
- [Paolino Pace (February 1773? – 10 May 1773)]
- Francesco Paolo Mandarani (10 May 1773 – 19 May 1796 Died)

==== 1800 to 2004 ====
- Carlo Pellegrini (29 Jan 1798 – 12 May 1818 Resigned)
- Gabriele Papa (17 Dec 1819 Confirmed – 20 Dec 1824)
- Niccola Berlingeri (19 Dec 1825 Confirmed – 23 Feb 1854 Died)
- Giacinto Maria Barberi, O.P. (23 Jun 1854 Confirmed – 7 Mar 1891 Died)
- Domenico Maria Valensise (7 Mar 1891 Succeeded – 2 Jun 1902 Resigned)
- Giovanni Régine (4 Oct 1902 – 6 Dec 1915)
- Eugenio Giambro (22 May 1916 – 2 Feb 1955 Retired)
- Vincenzo Maria Jacono (2 Feb 1955 Succeeded – 18 Jan 1961 Resigned)
- Vittorio Moietta (18 Jan 1961 – 1 Apr 1963 Died)
- Renato Luisi (30 Jun 1963 – 1 Jun 1968 Resigned)
- Ferdinando Palatucci (12 Oct 1968 – 30 Jan 1982 Appointed, Archbishop of Amalfi)
- Vincenzo Rimedio (4 Sep 1982 – 24 Jan 2004 Retired)

=== Diocese of Lamezia Terme ===
Name Changed: 30 September 1986
Latin Name: Neocastrensis
Metropolitan: Archdiocese of Catanzaro-Squillace

- Luigi Antonio Cantafora (24 Jan 2004 – 3 May 2019)
- Giuseppe Schillaci (3 May 2019 - )

== Books ==
=== References ===
- Eubel, Conradus, ed. (1913). Hierarchia catholica. Vol. I (second ed.). Münster: Libreria Regensbergiana. (in Latin)
- Eubel, Conradus, ed. (1914). Hierarchia catholica. Vol. II (second ed.). Münster: Libreria Regensbergiana.
- Eubel, Conradus (1923). Gulik, Guilelmus (ed.). Hierarchia catholica. Vol. III (second ed.). Münster: Libreria Regensbergiana.
- Gams, Pius Bonifatius (1873). Series episcoporum Ecclesiae catholicae: quotquot innotuerunt a beato Petro apostolo (in Latin). Ratisbon: Typis et Sumptibus Georgii Josephi Manz.
- Gauchat, Patritius (Patrice) (1935). Hierarchia catholica. Vol. IV (1592-1667). Münster: Libraria Regensbergiana.
- Ritzler, Remigius; Sefrin, Pirminus (1968). Hierarchia Catholica medii et recentioris aevi (1800–1846) (in Latin). Vol. VII. Monasterii: Libr. Regensburgiana.
- Ritzler, Remigius; Pirminus Sefrin (1978). Hierarchia catholica Medii et recentioris aevi... A Pontificatu PII PP. IX (1846) usque ad Pontificatum Leonis PP. XIII (1903) (in Latin). Vol. VIII. Il Messaggero di S. Antonio.
- Pięta, Zenon (2002). Hierarchia catholica medii et recentioris aevi... A pontificatu Pii PP. X (1903) usque ad pontificatum Benedictii PP. XV (1922) (in Latin). Vol. IX. Padua: Messagero di San Antonio. ISBN 978-88-250-1000-8.

=== Studies ===
- Ardito, Pietro (1889). Spigolature storiche sulla città di Nicastro (in Italian). Nicastro: tip. e libr. Bevilacqua.
- Avino, Vincenzio d' (1848). Cenni storici sulle chiese arcivescovili, vescovili, e prelatizie (nullius) del regno delle due Sicilie (in Italian). Naples: dalle stampe di Ranucci. pp. 456–471. (article by Cav. Francesco Avilardi)
- Cappelletti, Giuseppe (1864). Le chiese d'Italia: dalla loro origine sino ai nostri giorni (in Italian). Vol. Tomo decimonono (19). Venice: G. Antonelli. pp. 337–340.
- Duchesne, Louis (1902), "Les évèchés de Calabre," Mélanges Paul Fabre: études d'histoire du moyen âge (in French). Paris: A. Picard et fils. 1902. pp. 1–16.
- Giuliani, Pasquale (1867). Memorie istoriche della città di Nicastro da' tempi più remoti fino al 1820 (in Italian). Nicastro: tip. Vincenzo Colavita.
- Kamp, Norbert (1975). Kirche und Monarchie im staufischen Königreich Sizilien: I. Prosopographische Grundlegung, Bistumer und Bistümer und Bischöfe des Konigreichs 1194–1266: 2. Apulien und Calabrien München: Wilhelm Fink 1975.
- Kehr, Paulus Fridolin (1975). Italia pontificia. Regesta pontificum Romanorum. Vol. X: Calabria–Insulae. Berlin: Weidmann. (in Latin)
- Taccone-Gallucci, Domenico (1902). Regesti dei Romani pontefici della Calabria (in Italian). Rome: Tip. Vaticana. p. 402.
- Ughelli, Ferdinando; Coleti, Niccolo (1721). Italia Sacra Sive De Episcopis Italiae, Et Insularum adiacentium (in Latin). Vol. Tomus nonus (9). Venice: Antonio Coleti. pp. 400–412.
