= Nicastro =

- Circoscrizione
- Interactive map of Nicastro
- Coordinates: 38°59′N 16°19′E
- Country: Italy
- Region: Calabria
- Province: Catanzaro (CZ)
- Comune: Lamezia Terme
- Elevation: 216 m (709 ft)

Population
  - Total: 49,325
- Postal code: 88046
- Area code: (+39) 0968

Nicastro is a town in the province of Catanzaro, in the Calabria region of southern Italy. Since 1968 it constitutes, together with Sambiase and Sant'Eufemia Lamezia, the city of Lamezia Terme.

== Geography ==
It is situated on the isthmus between the gulfs of Sant'Eufemia and of Squillace, the narrowest part of the entire Italian peninsula. At 216 meters above sea-level, it commands a fine view.

== History ==
Nicastro's origins trace back to the 9th century, when Calabria was part of the Byzantine Empire, when a fortress called Neo Castrum ("New Castle") was created. The centre was founded during the time of Saracen raids (IX-Xcentury), pushing coastal inhabitants to move to surrounding higher fortified ground.

However, many finds dating back to the Neolithic age and from the Magna Graecia era (IV century BC) have emerged.

In 1057, the area was conquered by the Normans, but Nicastro revolted against Robert Guiscard and his brother Roger. Having dominated the revolt, the new nobiliary had the Castle built, which was restored in the XIII century by Frederick II of Swabia in the XIII century. The castle of Nicastro served as the place of imprisonment of Frederick II's son Henry.

Giovanni Antonio Facchinetti, who was briefly Innocent IX, was the bishop of Nicastro from 1560 to 1572.

The area suffered greatly in the earthquakes of 1638, which destroyed the cathedral and the Benedictine abbey of St. Euphemia, founded by Robert Guiscard. Valuable archives were lost in the ruins.

Until the 18th century, in Nicastro and its surroundings sericulture was a very widespread and prosperous activity, so much so that five thousand pounds of raw silk were produced every year. According to the historian Giuseppe Maria Galanti, at the end of the 18th century, sericulture alongside the cultivation of mulberry trees for the breeding of silkworms were still practiced, however there was a decline in the production.

== See also ==
- Lamezia Terme Town Library
- Ardo Perri

== Notes and references ==
- Lameziastorica.it History of Lamezia Terme Nicastro
- Article from the Catholic Encyclopedia
