= Alfonso Gesualdo =

Italian Cardinal

- Cardinal-Bishop of Ostia (e Velletri)
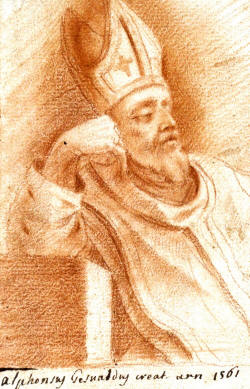
- Church: Catholic Church
- See: Ostia (e Velletri)
- In office: 20 March 1591 – 14 February 1603
- Predecessor: Giovanni Antonio Serbelloni
- Successor: Tolomeo Gallio
- Other posts: Archbishop of Naples (1596-1603); Prefect of the Sacred Congregation of Rites (1588-1603)
- Previous posts: Cardinal-Bishop of Porto e Santa Rufina (1589-1591); Cardinal-Bishop of Frascati (1587-1589); Cardinal-Bishop of Albano (1583-1587); Cardinal-Priest of San Clemente (1580-1583); Cardinal-Priest of San Pietro in Vincoli (1579-1580); Cardinal-Priest of Sant'Anastasia (1578-1579); Cardinal-Priest of Santa Prisca (1572-1578); Archbishop of Conza (1564-1572); Cardinal-Priest of Santa Cecilia (1563-1572); Administrator of Conza (1561-1564); Cardinal-Deacon of Santa Cecilia (1561-1563)

Orders
- Ordination: 20 December 1561
- Consecration: 23 April 1564 by Francesco Pisani
- Created cardinal: 26 February 1561

Personal details
- Born: Alfonso Gesualdo di Conza; 20 October 1540 Calitri, Kingdom of Naples, Spanish Empire
- Died: 14 February 1603 (aged 62) Naples, Kingdom of Naples, Spanish Empire

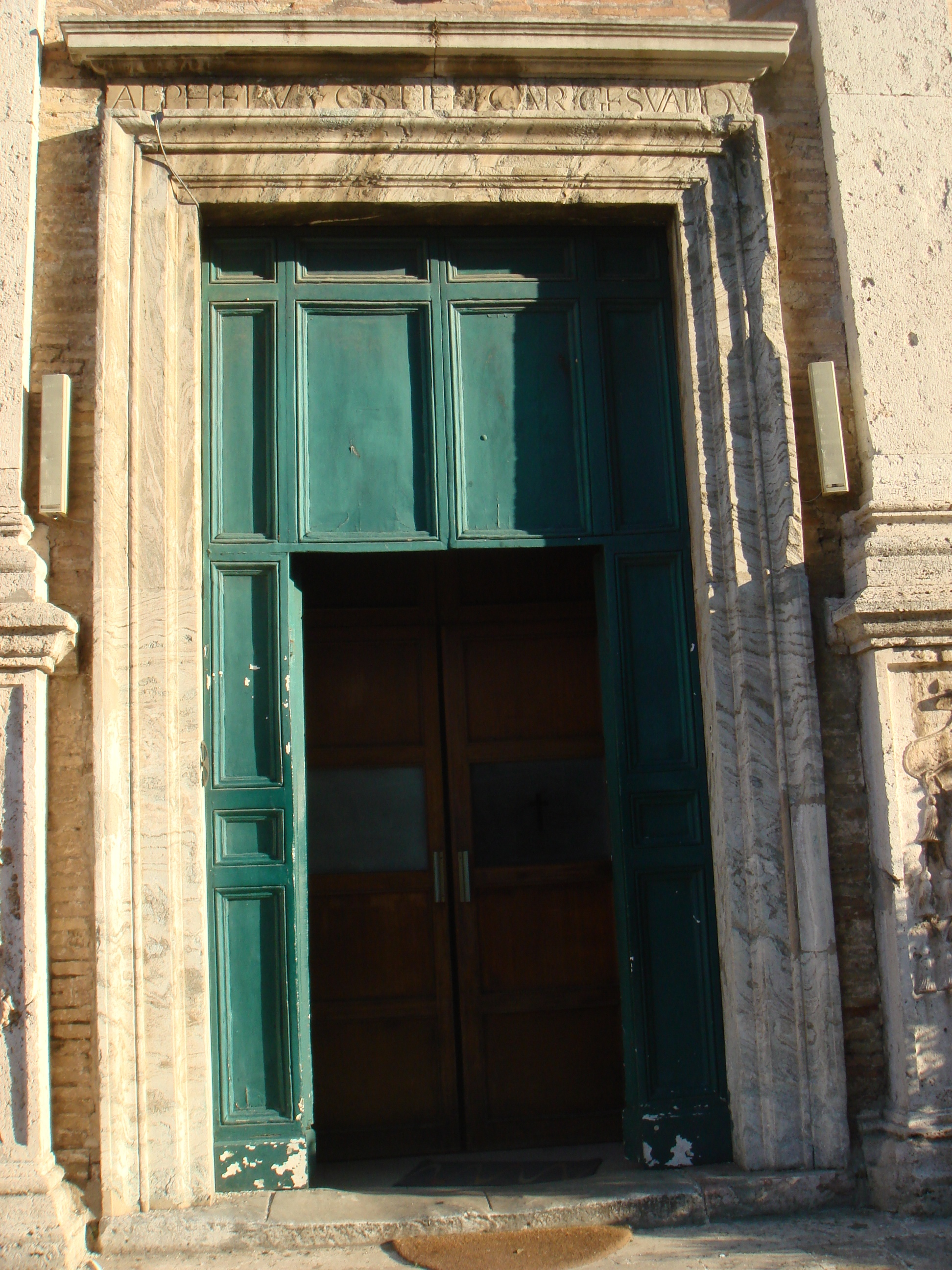
Main door of Santa Aurea, Ostia Antica. The inscription reads in Latin, ALPH EPVS OSTIEN CARD GESVALDVS, "Alfonso, Bishop of Ostia, Cardinal Gesualdo."

Alfonso Gesualdo di Conza (20 October 1540 – 14 February 1603) became an Italian Cardinal in 1561. He was from Calitri, not far from Naples. His attendance at the papal conclave of 1565-1566, at the age of only 25, makes him one of the youngest Cardinals ever to participate in a papal election.

He was Archbishop of Conza in 1564 (consecrated 23 April 1564 by Francesco Pisani), Bishop of Albano in 1583, Bishop of Frascati in 1587, Bishop of Porto e Santa Rufina in 1589, Bishop of Ostia in 1591, and Archbishop of Naples in 1596.

He was a patron of Sant'Andrea della Valle in Rome, the mother church of the Theatine Order. The composer Carlo Gesualdo was his nephew.

== Episcopal succession ==
Episcopal succession of Alfonso Gesualdo

While bishop, he was the principal consecrator of:

- Salvatore Caracciolo, Archbishop of Conza (1572);
- Marcantonio Pescara, Archbishop of Conza (1574);
- Silvio de Sainte-Croix, Archbishop of Arles (1574);
- Ippolito Aldobrandini (seniore), Pope of Rome (1592);
- Filippo Spinelli, Titular Bishop of Colossae and Coadjutor Bishop of Policastro (1592);
- Marco Magnacervo, Bishop of Lucera (1593);
- Vincenzo Giustiniani, Bishop of Gravina di Puglia (1593);
- Basilio Pignatelli, Bishop of L'Aquila (1593);
- Annibale D'Afflitto, Archbishop of Reggio Calabria (1593);
- Cesare Del Pezzo, Bishop of Valva e Sulmona (1593);
- Benedetto Mandina, Bishop of Caserta (1594); and
- Juan de Castro, Archbishop of Taranto (1600).
