= Gennaro Portanova =

His Eminence Gennaro Portanova
- Archbishop of Reggio Calabria
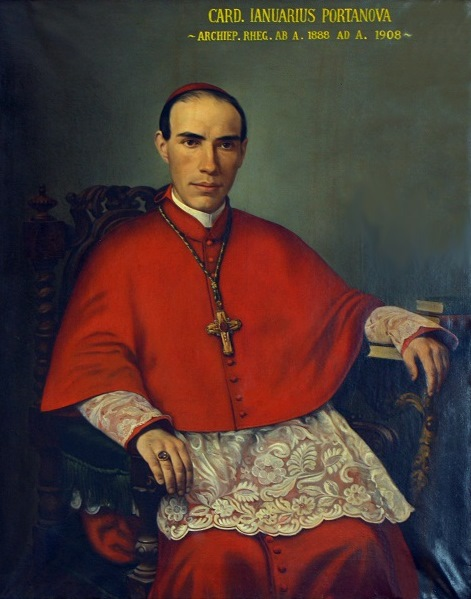
- Church: Roman Catholic Church
- Archdiocese: Reggio Calabria
- See: Reggio Calabria
- Appointed: 16 March 1888
- Term ended: 25 April 1908
- Predecessor: Francesco Converti
- Successor: Rinaldo Camillo Rousset
- Other post: Cardinal-Priest of San Clemente (1899–1908)
- Previous posts: Titular Bishop of Rhosus (1883–85); Coadjutor Bishop of Ischia (1883–85); Bishop of Ischia (1885–88); Apostolic Administrator of Bova (1889–95); Apostolic Administrator of Oppido Mamertina (1898–99)

Orders
- Ordination: 22 May 1869 by Sisto Riario Sforza
- Consecration: 12 August 1883 by Raffaele Monaco La Valletta
- Created cardinal: 19 June 1899 by Pope Leo XIII
- Rank: Cardinal-Priest

Personal details
- Born: Gennaro Portanova; 11 October 1845 Naples, Kingdom of the Two Sicilies
- Died: 25 April 1908 (aged 62) Reggio Calabria, Kingdom of Italy
- Buried: Reggio Calabria Cathedral

Gennaro Portanova (born 11 October 1845 in Naples, Italy, died 25 April 1908 in Reggio Calabria) was a cardinal of the Catholic Church; he was also a professor of theology at the Naples Seminary (1877-83), bishop of Ischia (1883-88), after the large earthquake there, and later archbishop of Reggio Calabria 1888-1908.

He was made a cardinal in 1899 by Pope Leo XIII. During this time, he was Protector of the Institute of the Daughters of Mary Immaculate. He took part in the 1903 conclave which elected Pope Pius X.

== Publications ==
Errors and delusions of Darwinism (1872)

== Sources ==
- Bräuer, Martin (2014). Handbuch der Kardinäle: 1846-2012 (in German). Berlin: De Gruyter. p. 1901. ISBN 978-3-11-026947-5.
