= Giovanni Ferro =

Italian Catholic prelate and archbishop

Venerable Giovanni Ferro C.R.S.
- Archbishop Emeritus of Reggio Calabria
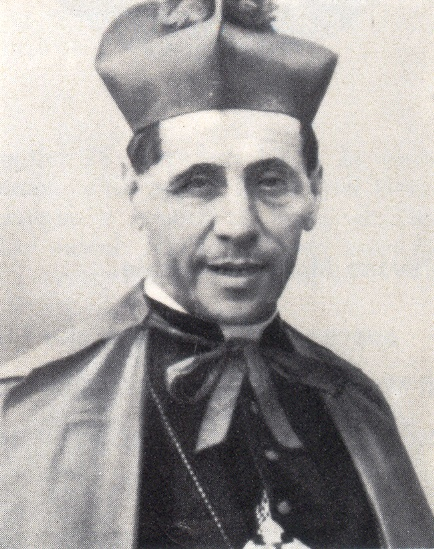
- Church: Roman Catholic Church
- Archdiocese: Reggio Calabria
- See: Reggio Calabria
- Appointed: 14 September 1950
- Installed: 2 December 1950
- Term ended: 4 June 1977
- Predecessor: Antonio Lanza
- Successor: Aurelio Sorrentino
- Previous posts: Bishop of Bova (1950-60); Apostolic Administrator of Oppido Mamertina (1965-71); Apostolic Administrator of Bova (1967-73); Bishop of Bova (1973-77)

Orders
- Ordination: 11 April 1925 by Amedeo Casabona
- Consecration: 29 October 1950 by Giuseppe Siri

Personal details
- Born: Giovanni Ferro; 13 November 1901 Costigliole d'Asti, Asti, Kingdom of Italy
- Died: 18 April 1992 (aged 90) Reggio Calabria, Italy
- Education: Pontifical Gregorian University
- Motto: Omnia in caritate
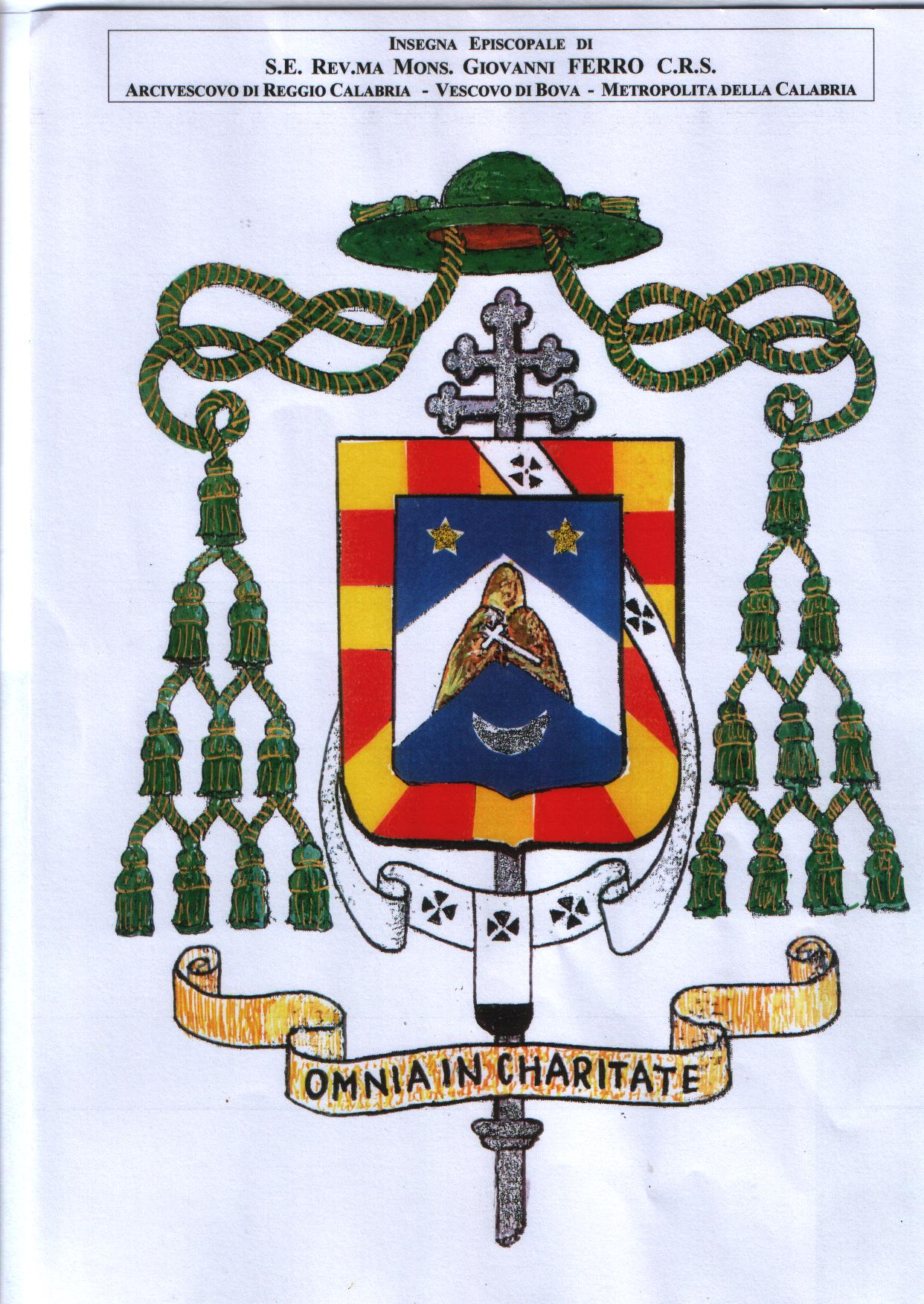
- Coat of arms: Giovanni Ferro's coat of arms

Sainthood
- Venerated in: Roman Catholic Church
- Title as Saint: Venerable
- Attributes: Episcopal attire

Ordination history of Giovanni Ferro
History
Priestly ordination
- Ordained by: Amedeo Casabona
Episcopal consecration
- Principal consecrator: Giuseppe Siri
- Co-consecrators: Umberto Rossi; Francesco Marchesani
Episcopal succession
Bishops consecrated by Giovanni Ferro as principal consecrator
- Santo Bergamo: 25 January 1970
- Giuseppe Agostino: 11 February 1974

Giovanni Ferro (13 November 1901 – 18 April 1992) was an Italian Roman Catholic prelate and professed member from the Somascans, who served as the Archbishop of Reggio Calabria from 1950 until his resignation in 1977. Ferro had served twice as the Bishop of Bova while managing his archdiocese, first from 1950 to 1960 and again from 1973 until 1977. Ferro commenced his ecclesial studies in his late childhood and studied in Milan and Turin before completing his education in Rome. He began teaching and serving as a pastor before ascending to some leadership positions within the Somascans. This continued until he was appointed as an archbishop where he became renowned for his charitable outreach to the poor and downtrodden and for his consistent efforts in evangelization; these efforts increased following the Second Vatican Council when he sought to introduce renewal into his episcopal see.

Ferro likewise tended to victims of flooding on at least two occasions in 1951 and in 1953 and opened his episcopal residence to those who lost their homes. He opened new schools and sporting facilities in addition to helping rebuild a chapel within the archdiocesan cathedral. His work earned him praise in 1971 from both Pope Paul VI and the Italian President Giuseppe Saragat who awarded him with a silver goblet dating back to the 1700s as a sign of his esteem for the prelate.

The beatification process launched in 2008 and he has become titled as a Servant of God. Pope Francis confirmed his heroic virtue and titled him as Venerable in mid-2019.

== Life ==
Giovanni Ferro was born on 13 November 1901 to the shoemaker Giovanni Battista Ferro and Carlotta Borio. He was baptized on 24 November in the local parish church. His priest cousin Tagliaferri served as a model for Ferro in his childhood as did the local parish priest and the nun Matilde.

Ferro soon came to the decision to enter the priesthood and commenced his studies under the Somascan order on 5 August 1912, while he obtained a licentiate in 1917 in Milan after he had completed his high school education. On 7 October 1919 he commenced his novitiate with the order, which ended on 8 October 1920 at Sant'Alessio all'Aventino in Rome where he made his initial profession. The novice master Luigi Zambarelli held Ferro in high esteem and noted that he was "a little saint". Ferro made his solemn profession into the order on 14 March 1924 at the Santa Maria Maddalena parish church in Genoa. On 11 April 1925 he received his ordination to the priesthood in Chiavari from the local bishop Amedeo Casabona. In 1925 he obtained excellent grades while at the Pontifical Gregorian University and obtained his licentiate in philosophical studies. He later received his doctorate cum laude in theological studies in Turin on 27 May 1931.

In 1931 he was made the rector for the Collegio Trevisio in Casale Monferrato, until 1938 when he was transferred to become the rector for the Collegio Gallio in Como. During World War II he helped those in need and tended to the poor and displaced. Ferro also risked himself in hiding the Jew Roberto Furcht from the S.S. and offered him free lodging. Following Benito Mussolini's death he kept hidden the late dictator's son Vittorio and the son-in-law of the late dictator's brother Arnaldo. The pair remained with Ferro until 12 November 1945 and had lodged with him since that April in fear of retribution and partisan attacks. On 1 October 1945 he was transferred to Genoa as the pastor for the Santa Maria Maddalena parish where he remained until 1950. In the meantime on 18 August 1948 he was elected as the provincial superior for the Liguria region of his order and held that position until his episcopal appointment.

Ferro was appointed in 1950 as the Archbishop of Reggio Calabria in addition to being named as the Bishop of Bova. He received his episcopal consecration from Giuseppe Siri in the Genoa Cathedral on 29 October 1950 before being enthroned in his new archdiocese on 2 December and then in Bova on 8 December. In his see he constructed new parishes and in 1951 and 1953 tended to the victims of rampant floods, opening his episcopal residence to the victims. Ferro likewise oversaw the repair of the Sacramento chapel in the archdiocesan cathedral and helped in the construction of new schools and sporting facilities. From 1963 until 1965 he attended all sessions of the Second Vatican Council and sought to institute a similar program of renewal in his archdiocese following the council's closure. In 1962 he issued his pastoral letter Ut Unum sint. Pope John XXIII named him as an Assistant at the Pontifical Throne. He served consecutive terms from 1950 until 1977 as the President of the Calabrian Episcopal Conference. Ferro at one point led a diocesan pilgrimage to Rome to visit Pope Paul VI and another to Jerusalem. In 1968 he presided over another pilgrimage designed to follow in the footsteps of Saint Peter and Saint Paul and he took this time to visit the Patriarch of Constantinople Athenagoras. In 1971 the President Giuseppe Saragat awarded him with a silver chalice dating back to the 1700s in recognition for all Ferro had done in his archdiocese and as a token of his esteem. In 1950 he made his first pastoral visit and announced his second on 30 December 1958. He announced the third on 7 March 1965 and the final one on 2 December 1972.

On 13 November 1976 he forwarded his letter of resignation to the pope who approved it on 14 June 1977; it was at 12:00 pm on 14 June that he announced that his resignation had been accepted. The municipal council in Reggio Calabria made him a citizen on 11 August in a unanimous decision in recognition and praise for Ferro's works and for his efforts in the archdiocese. His last Mass and departure was celebrated on 27 August in which he was hoisted up on a chair and carried at the celebration's conclusion on the shoulders of some men. He left for Rome where he lived at Sant'Alessio all'Aventino and later returned to Reggio Calabria on 11 November 1978. Pope John Paul II visited Ferro twice, in 1984 and 1988.

Ferro suffered from disease in the 1980s that took its toll on his health and led to his death during the morning on 18 April 1992 which happened to be Holy Saturday. His remains were interred in the side chapel in the archdiocesan cathedral where there was later installed a bronze monument dedicated to him.

== Beatification process ==
The beatification process commenced on 8 April 2008 under Pope Benedict XVI after the Congregation for the Causes of Saints titled Ferro as a Servant of God and issued the nihil obstat (no objections) edict that opened the cause. The diocesan process was launched in the Reggio Calabria-Bova archdiocese on 21 May 2008 and concluded on 29 September 2011, after having collected documentation and witness testimonies in regards to Ferro's life and reputation for holiness. The C.C.S. validated the diocesan process on 7 December 2012.

Ferro became titled as Venerable on 5 July 2019 after Pope Francis confirmed that Ferro had lived a life of heroic virtue.

The current postulator for the cause is the Somascan priest Giovanni Gariglio.
