= Lelio Brancaccio (bishop) =

Most Reverend Lelio Brancaccio
- Archbishop of Taranto
- Church: Catholic Church
- Archdiocese: Archdiocese of Taranto
- In office: 1574–1599
- Predecessor: Girolamo di Corregio
- Successor: Juan de Castro (bishop of Taranto)
- Previous post: Archbishop of Sorrento (1571–1574)

Personal details
- Died: 1599 Taranto, Italy

Lelio Brancaccio (died 1599) was a Roman Catholic prelate who served as Archbishop of Taranto (1574–1599) and Archbishop of Sorrento (1571–1574).

== Biography ==
On 20 June 1571, Lelio Brancaccio was appointed during the papacy of Pope Pius V as Archbishop of Sorrento. On 15 November 1574, he was appointed during the papacy of Pope Gregory XIII as Archbishop of Taranto. He served as Archbishop of Taranto until his death in 1599.

== External links and additional sources ==
- Cheney, David M. "Archdiocese of Sorrento–Castellammare di Stabia". Catholic-Hierarchy.org. (for Chronology of Bishops) ^{[self-published]}
- Chow, Gabriel. "Archdiocese of Sorrento–Castellammare di Stabia (Italy)". GCatholic.org. (for Chronology of Bishops) ^{[self-published]}

Catholic Church titles
Preceded by Giulio Pavesi	Archbishop of Sorrento; 1571–1574	Succeeded by Giuseppe Donzelli
Preceded by Girolamo di Corregio	Archbishop of Taranto; 1574–1599	Succeeded by Juan de Castro (bishop of Taranto)
