= Cardinal of Aragon =

Cardinal of Aragon (or Aragón, Aragona) may refer to:

- Giovanni d'Aragona (1456–1485)
- Luigi d'Aragona (1474–1519)
