= Veronica Gambara =

Italian poet and politician (1485–1550)

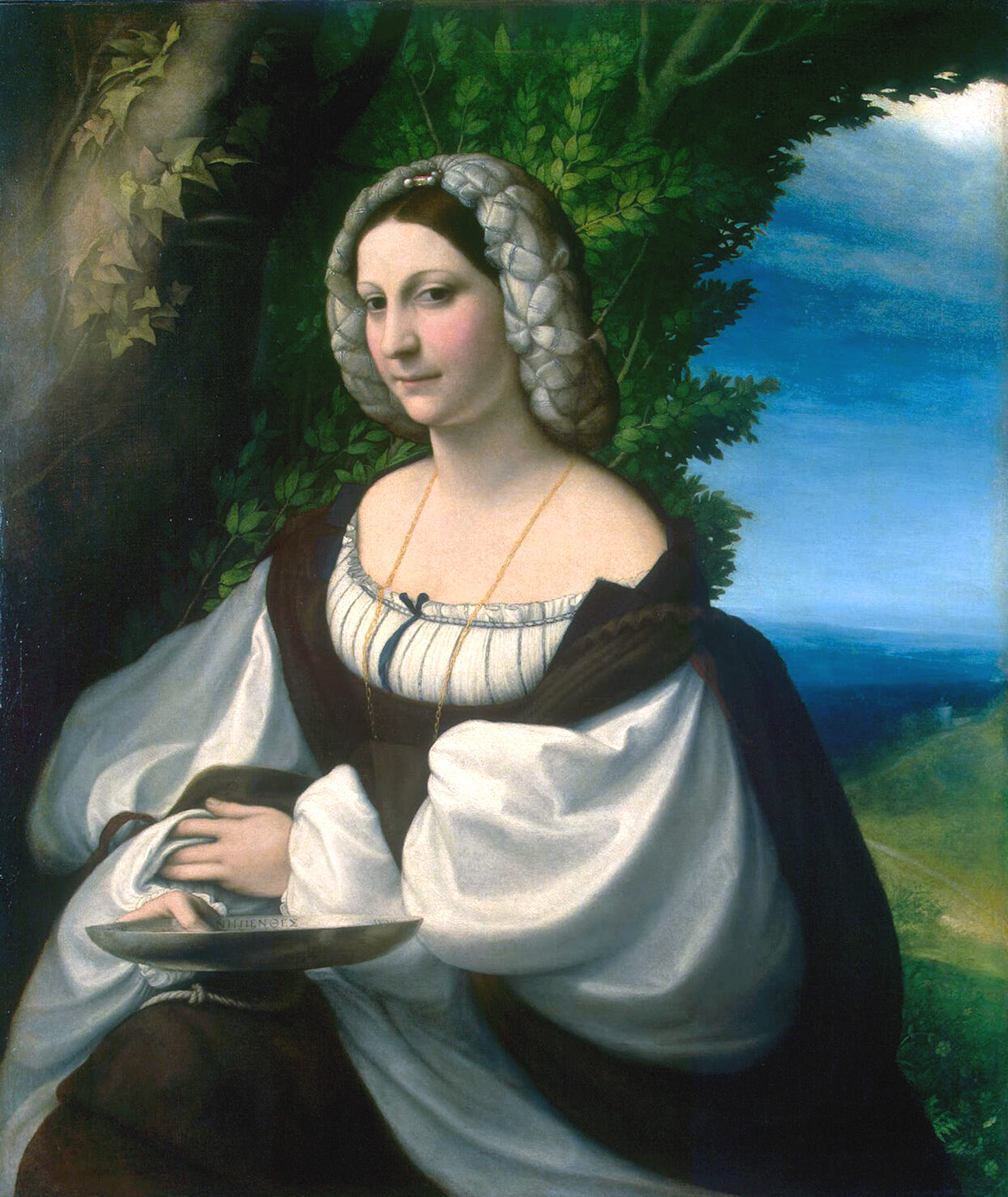
- Painting by Antonio da Correggio, c. 1517-18
- Born: 29 or 30 November 1485; Pralboino
- Died: 13 June 1550 (aged 64); Correggio
- Spouses: Giberto VII, Count of Correggio (m. 1509; died 1518)
- Issue: Ippolito; Girolamo di Corregio

Veronica Gambara (29 or 30 November 1485 – 13 June 1550) was an Italian poet and politician. She was the ruler of the County of Correggio from 1518 until 1550.

== Biography ==
Born in Pralboino (now in the Province of Brescia), in Lombardy, Italy, Gambara came from a distinguished family, one of the seven children of Count Gianfrancesco da Gambara and Alda Pio da Carpi. Her family contained a number of distinguished female intellectuals, including her great-aunts, the humanist poets Ginevre and Isotta Nogarola. Veronica was also a niece of Emilia Pia, the principal female interlocutor of Baldessare Castiglione's Il Cortegiano.

Gambara received a humanist education, studying Latin, Greek, philosophy, theology and scripture. In 1502, at the age of 17, she began corresponding with the leading neo-Petrarchan, Pietro Bembo, who became her poetic mentor two years later when she began sending him her compositions.

In 1509, at the age of 24, she married her cousin, the 50-year-old widower Giberto VII, Count of Correggio, in Amalfi. They had two sons, Ippolito was born in 1510 and Girolamo in 1511. After Giberto's death in 1518, she took charge of the state (including management of Correggio's condottieri), as well as the education of her two sons and step-daughter Costanza. Her niece, Camilla Valenti, daughter of Violante the sister of Veronica, was also putatively a poet.

Under Gambara's rule, the small court of Correggio became something of a salon, visited by such important figures as Pietro Bembo, Gian Giorgio Trissino, Marcantonio Flaminio, Ludovico Ariosto, and Titian. Previously aligned with French king, Francis I, Gambara allied Correggio with Holy Roman Emperor Charles V. She personally received Charles V at her estate in 1530, when he signed a treaty guaranteeing Correggio would not again be besieged, and a second time in 1533. The treaty was broken, however, in 1538 when Galeotto Pico II, Count of Mirandola and Concordia, launched an attack on Correggio. Gambara organized a successful defense of the city, and between 1546 and 1550, saw that Charles V paid for improved fortifications.

She died on 13 June 1550 in Correggio, Italy.

== Poetry and correspondence ==
Approximately 80 of her poems and 150 of her letters are extant, and a complete English translation of her poems was published in 2014. Little of her poetry was published during her lifetime, though it circulated in manuscript and was well-known throughout Italy by 1530. Gambara primarily composed poetry in Italian falling into four categories: poems on political issues, devotional poems, Virgilian pastoral, and love poems to her husband. Her political poems are particularly notable for expressing a concept of Italy as an entity centuries prior to unification. Most of her poems are sonnets, although she also wrote madrigals, ballads, and stanze in ottava rima. She also composed a number of poems in Latin, including an ode for Charles V with which she greeted the fellow sovereign on his visit to Correggio in 1530.

Gambara was in correspondence with a number of important scholars and poets of the day. Beyond the above-mentioned Pietro Bembo, she corresponded with the poet Bernardo Tasso, the writer Matteo Bandello, and author and playwright Pietro Aretino (who would come to slander her as a "laureated harlot," an attack Gambara simply ignored). She also exchanged letters with Charles V. Gambara's letters, never intended for publication, shed light on her personal life. In a 1549 letter to Ludovico Rosso she admits to exhaustion with her responsibilities, and expresses a desire to retire to a solitary country life.
