= Gaspar de Creales Arce =

Roman Catholic archbishop

Most Reverend Gaspar de Creales Arce
- Archbishop of Reggio Calabria
- Church: Catholic Church
- Archdiocese: Archdiocese of Reggio Calabria
- In office: 1644–1658
- Predecessor: Annibale D'Afflitto
- Successor: Matteo di Génnaro

Orders
- Consecration: 27 December 1644 by Gil Carrillo de Albornoz

Personal details
- Died: 1658

Gaspar de Creales Arce (death 1658) was a Roman Catholic prelate who served as Archbishop of Reggio Calabria (1644–1658).

== Biography ==
On 12 December 1644, Gaspar de Creales Arce was appointed during the papacy of Pope Innocent X as Archbishop of Reggio Calabria. On 27 December 1644, he was consecrated bishop by Gil Carrillo de Albornoz, Cardinal-Priest of San Pietro in Montorio. He served as Archbishop of Reggio Calabria until his death in 1658.

== External links and additional sources ==
- Cheney, David M. "Archdiocese of Reggio Calabria-Bova". Catholic-Hierarchy.org. (for Chronology of Bishops) ^{[self-published]}
- Chow, Gabriel. "Metropolitan Archdiocese of Reggio Calabria–Bova". GCatholic.org. (for Chronology of Bishops) ^{[self-published]}

Catholic Church titles
Preceded by Annibale D'Afflitto	Archbishop of Reggio Calabria; 1644–1658	Succeeded by Matteo di Génnaro
