= Tommaso de Sarria =

17th-century Catholic bishop

Most Reverend Tommaso de Sarria
- Archbishop of Taranto
- Church: Catholic Church
- Archdiocese: Archdiocese of Taranto
- Predecessor: Tommaso Caracciolo
- Successor: Francesco Pignatelli
- Previous post: Archbishop of Trani (1656–1665)

Personal details
- Born: 1606 Pontevedra, Spain
- Died: 5 November 1682 (age 76) Taranto, Italy

Tommaso de Sarria, O.P. (1606 – 5 November 1682) was a Roman Catholic prelate who served as Archbishop of Taranto (1665–1682) and Archbishop of Trani (1656–1665).

== Biography ==
Tommaso de Sarria was born in Pontevedra, Spain in 1606 and ordained a priest in the Order of Preachers. On 13 March 1654, he was selected as the Archbishop of Trani and confirmed by Pope Innocent X on 16 October 1656. On 13 April 1665, he was appointed during the papacy of Pope Alexander VII as Archbishop of Taranto. He served as Archbishop of Taranto until his death on 5 November 1682.

== Episcopal succession ==
Episcopal succession of Tommaso de Sarria

While bishop, Sarria was the principal co-consecrator of:

- Giovanni Antonio Geloso, Bishop of Patti (1669);
- Antonio Primi, Bishop of Trebinje e Mrkan (1669);
- Giovanni Antonio Baldi, Bishop of Chioggia (1669);
- Alfonso Álvarez Barba Ossorio, Archbishop of Lanciano (1669);
- Alfonso de Balmaseda, Bishop of Cassano all'Jonio (1670);
- Martín Ibáñez y Villanueva, Bishop of Gaeta (1670);
- Vincenzo Maffia, Bishop of Patti (1671);
- Bishop Vincenzo Maria da Silva, Bishop of Policastro (1671);
- Bishop Francesco Martinelli, Bishop of Patti (1680); and
- Bishop Francesco Tansi, Bishop of Nicastro (1680).

== External links and additional sources ==
- Cheney, David M. "Archdiocese of Trani-Barletta-Bisceglie (-Nazareth)". Catholic-Hierarchy.org. (for Chronology of Bishops) ^{[self-published]}
- Chow, Gabriel. "Archdiocese of Trani-Barletta-Bisceglie (Italy)". GCatholic.org. (for Chronology of Bishops) ^{[self-published]}

Catholic Church titles
Preceded by Tommaso d'Ancora	Archbishop of Trani; 1656–1665	Succeeded by Giovanni Battista del Tinto
Preceded by Tommaso Caracciolo	Archbishop of Taranto; 1665–1682	Succeeded by Francesco Pignatelli
