= Tommaso Caracciolo (archbishop of Taranto) =

Most Reverend Tommaso Caracciolo
- Archbishop of Taranto
- Church: Catholic Church
- Archdiocese: Archdiocese of Taranto
- In office: 1637–1665
- Predecessor: Gil Carrillo de Albornoz
- Successor: Tommaso de Sarria
- Previous post: Titular Archbishop of Cyrene (1631–1637)

Orders
- Consecration: 14 December 1631 by Giulio Savelli

Personal details
- Died: 1665 Taranto, Italy

Tommaso Caracciolo, C.R. (died 1665) was a Roman Catholic prelate who served as Archbishop of Taranto (1637–1665) and Titular Archbishop of Cyrene (1631–1637).

== Biography ==
Tommaso Caracciolo was ordained a priest in the Congregation of Clerics Regular of the Divine Providence. On 10 November 1631, he was appointed during the papacy of Pope Urban VIII as Titular Archbishop of Cyrene. On 14 December 1631, he was consecrated bishop by Giulio Savelli, Archbishop of Salerno. On 20 September 1636, he was selected as Archbishop of Taranto and confirmed on 30 March 1637 by Pope Gregory XIII. He served as Archbishop of Taranto until his death in 1665.

While bishop, he was the principal co-consecrator of Carlo Antonio Agudio, Bishop of Castellaneta (1650).

== See also ==
- Catholic Church in Italy

== External links and additional sources ==
- Cheney, David M. "Cyrene (Titular See)". Catholic-Hierarchy.org. (for Chronology of Bishops) ^{[self-published]}
- Chow, Gabriel. "Titular Episcopal See of Cyrene (Libya)". GCatholic.org. (for Chronology of Bishops) ^{[self-published]}

Catholic Church titles
Preceded by Gereon Otto von Gutmann zu Sobernheim	Titular Archbishop of Cyrene; 1631–1637	Succeeded by Etienne Via
Preceded by Gil Carrillo de Albornoz	Archbishop of Taranto; 1637–1665	Succeeded by Tommaso de Sarria
