= Annibale D'Afflitto =

Roman Catholic archbishop (died 1638)

Most Reverend Annibale D'Afflitto
- Archbishop of Reggio Calabria
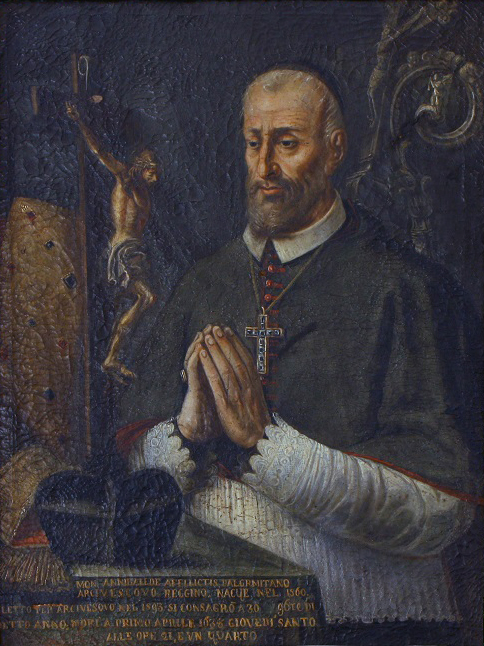
- Church: Catholic Church
- Archdiocese: Archdiocese of Reggio Calabria
- In office: 1593–1638
- Predecessor: Gaspare Ricciullo del Fosso
- Successor: Gaspar de Creales Arce

Orders
- Consecration: 30 November 1593 by Alfonso Gesualdo di Conza

Personal details
- Died: 1 April 1638

Annibale D'Afflitto (died 1638) was a Roman Catholic prelate who served as Archbishop of Reggio Calabria (1593–1638). He descends from the princely House d’Afflitto.

== Biography ==
On 15 November 1593, Annibale D'Afflitto was appointed during the papacy of Pope Clement VIII as Archbishop of Reggio Calabria. On 30 November 1593, he was consecrated bishop by Alfonso Gesualdo di Conza, Cardinal-Bishop of Ostia e Velletri, with Giulio Ottinelli, Bishop of Fano, and Cristóbal Senmanat y Robuster, Bishop Emeritus of Orihuela, serving as co-consecrators. He served as Archbishop of Reggio Calabria until his death on 1 April 1638.

== External links and additional sources ==
- Cheney, David M. "Archdiocese of Reggio Calabria-Bova". Catholic-Hierarchy.org. (for Chronology of Bishops) ^{[self-published]}
- Chow, Gabriel. "Metropolitan Archdiocese of Reggio Calabria–Bova". GCatholic.org. (for Chronology of Bishops) ^{[self-published]}

Catholic Church titles
| Preceded by Gaspare Ricciullo del Fosso | Archbishop of Reggio Calabria; 1593–1638 | Succeeded by Gaspar de Creales Arce |
