= Marcus of Calabria =

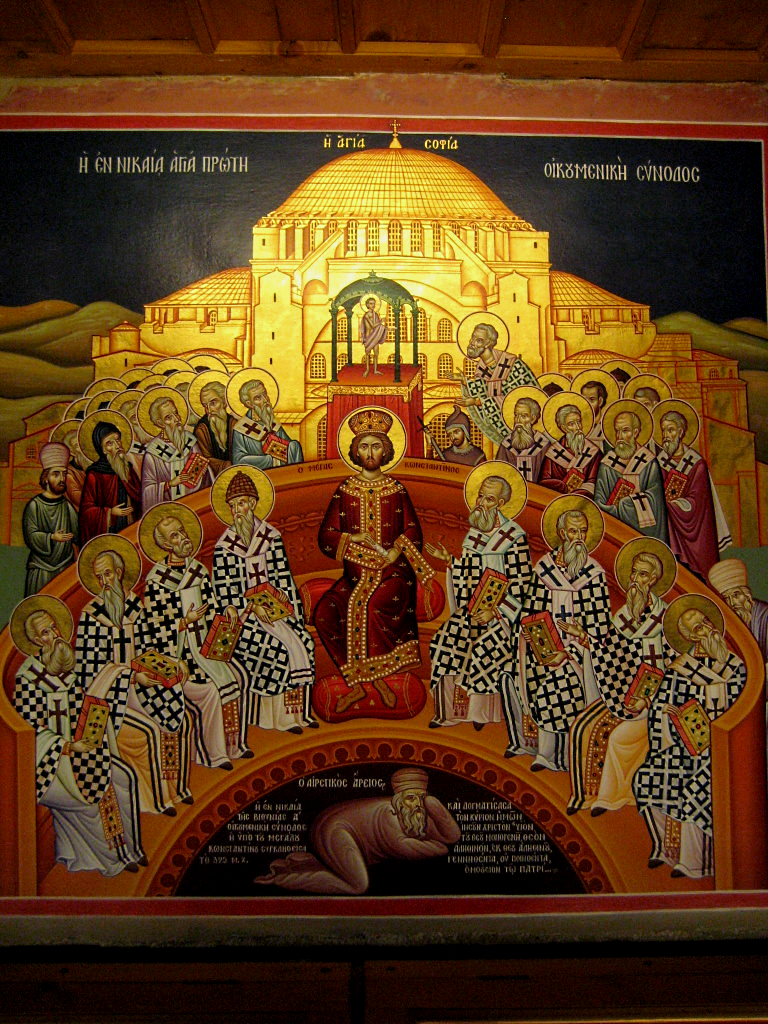
The Council of Nicaea, with Arius depicted as defeated, lying under Emperor Constantine's feet

Marcus of Calabria (fl. 325) was a fourth-century Roman bishop and delegate to the first Council of Nicaea.

Little is known of his life career or Episcopal work, and he would have remained largely unknown to history except that he was one of only five delegates from the Catholic Western Roman Empire to attend first Council of Nicaea.

He is listed as delegate 208 in the Greek version of the Patrum Nicaenorum Nomina as being Bishop of Calabria in Southern Italy; however, he is listed as a bishop from Dacia in the Syriac and the Greek text "Nicene Catalogue of Fathers and Cities", by Theodorus Lector, both of which record the proceedings of the First Council of Nicaea.
