= Matteo di Génnaro =

Roman Catholic archbishop

Most Reverend Matteo di Génnaro
- Archbishop of Reggio Calabria
- Church: Catholic Church
- Archdiocese: Archdiocese of Reggio Calabria
- In office: 1660–1674
- Predecessor: Gaspar de Creales Arce
- Successor: Martín Ibáñez y Villanueva

Orders
- Consecration: 11 April 1660 by Marcello Santacroce

Personal details
- Born: 1621 Naples, Italy
- Died: 21 January 1674 (age 53) Reggio Calabria, Italy

Matteo di Génnaro (1621–1674) was a Roman Catholic prelate who served as Archbishop of Reggio Calabria (1660–1674).

== Biography ==
Matteo di Génnaro was born in Naples, Italy in 1621. On 5 April 1660, he was appointed during the papacy of Pope Alexander VII as Archbishop of Reggio Calabria. On 11 April 1660, he was consecrated bishop by Marcello Santacroce, Bishop of Tivoli, with Giuseppe Ciantes, Bishop Emeritus of Marsico Nuovo, and Giovanni Agostino Marliani, Bishop Emeritus of Accia and Mariana, serving as co-consecrators. He served as Archbishop of Reggio Calabria until his death on 21 January 1674.

While bishop, he was the principal co-consecrator of Bonaventura Cavalli, Bishop of Caserta (1668).

== External links and additional sources ==
- Cheney, David M. "Archdiocese of Reggio Calabria-Bova". Catholic-Hierarchy.org. (for Chronology of Bishops) ^{[self-published]}
- Chow, Gabriel. "Metropolitan Archdiocese of Reggio Calabria–Bova". GCatholic.org. (for Chronology of Bishops) ^{[self-published]}

Catholic Church titles
Preceded by Gaspar de Creales Arce	Archbishop of Reggio Calabria; 1660–1674	Succeeded by Martín Ibáñez y Villanueva
