= Pietro Filomarini =

Most Reverend Pietro Filomarini
- Archbishop of Reggio Calabria
- Church: Catholic Church
- Diocese: Archdiocese of Reggio Calabria
- In office: 1404–1420
- Successor: Bartolomeo Gattola

Personal details
- Died: 1420

Pietro Filomarini (died 1420) was a Roman Catholic prelate who served as Archbishop of Reggio Calabria (1404–1420).

== Biography ==
On 4 August 1404, he was appointed during the papacy of Pope Boniface IX as Archbishop of Reggio Calabria. He served as Archbishop of Reggio Calabria until his death in 1420.

== External links and additional sources ==
- Cheney, David M. "Archdiocese of Reggio Calabria-Bova". Catholic-Hierarchy.org. (for Chronology of Bishops) ^{[self-published]}
- Chow, Gabriel. "Metropolitan Archdiocese of Reggio Calabria–Bova". GCatholic.org. (for Chronology of Bishops) ^{[self-published]}

Catholic Church titles
Preceded by	Archbishop of Reggio Calabria; 1404–1420	Succeeded by Bartolomeo Gattola
