= Paolo di Segni =

Roman Catholic prelate

Most Reverend Paolo di Segni
- Archbishop of Reggio Calabria
- Church: Catholic Church
- Diocese: Archdiocese of Reggio Calabria
- In office: 1429–1437
- Predecessor: Gaspare Colonna
- Successor: Guglielmo Logoteta
- Previous posts: Bishop of Manfredonia (1414–1419); Bishop of Gerace (1419–1429)

Personal details
- Died: 1437

Paolo di Segni (died 1437) was a Roman Catholic prelate who served as Archbishop of Reggio Calabria (1429–1437), Bishop of Gerace (1419–1429), and Bishop of Manfredonia (1414–1419).

== Biography ==
On 4 February 1429, Paolo di Segni was appointed during the papacy of Pope Martin V as Archbishop of Reggio Calabria. He served as Archbishop of Reggio Calabria until his death in 1437.

== External links and additional sources ==
- Cheney, David M. "Archdiocese of Manfredonia-Vieste-San Giovanni Rotondo". Catholic-Hierarchy.org. (for Chronology of Bishops) ^{[self-published]}
- Chow, Gabriel. "Archdiocese of Manfredonia-Vieste-San Giovanni Rotondo (Italy)". GCatholic.org. (for Chronology of Bishops) ^{[self-published]}
- Cheney, David M. "Archdiocese of Reggio Calabria-Bova". Catholic-Hierarchy.org. (for Chronology of Bishops) ^{[self-published]}
- Chow, Gabriel. "Metropolitan Archdiocese of Reggio Calabria–Bova". GCatholic.org. (for Chronology of Bishops) ^{[self-published]}

Catholic Church titles
Preceded by	Bishop of Manfredonia; 1414–1419	Succeeded by
Preceded by	Bishop of Gerace; 1419–1429	Succeeded by
Preceded by Gaspare Colonna	Archbishop of Reggio Calabria; 1429–1437	Succeeded by Guglielmo Logoteta
