= Roberto Latino Orsini =

Most Reverend Roberto Latino Orsini
- Archbishop of Reggio Calabria
- Church: Catholic Church
- Diocese: Archdiocese of Reggio Calabria
- In office: 1512–1520
- Predecessor: Francesco Isvales
- Successor: Agostino Trivulzio

Personal details
- Died: 1520

Roberto Latino Orsini (died 1520) was a Roman Catholic prelate who served as Archbishop of Reggio Calabria (1512–1520).

== Biography ==
On 23 July 1512, Roberto Latino Orsini was appointed during the papacy of Pope Julius II as Archbishop of Reggio Calabria. He served as Archbishop of Reggio Calabria until his death in 1520.

== External links and additional sources ==
- Cheney, David M. "Archdiocese of Reggio Calabria-Bova". Catholic-Hierarchy.org. (for Chronology of Bishops) ^{[self-published]}
- Chow, Gabriel. "Metropolitan Archdiocese of Reggio Calabria–Bova". GCatholic.org. (for Chronology of Bishops) ^{[self-published]}

Catholic Church titles
Preceded by Francesco Isvales	Archbishop of Reggio Calabria; 1512–1520	Succeeded by Agostino Trivulzio
