= Pietro Trivulzio =

Most Reverend Pietro Trivulzio
- Archbishop of Reggio Calabria
- Church: Catholic Church
- Diocese: Archdiocese of Reggio Calabria
- In office: 1520–1523
- Predecessor: Agostino Trivulzio
- Successor: Agostino Trivulzio

Personal details
- Died: 1523

Pietro Trivulzio (died 1523) was a Roman Catholic prelate who served as Archbishop of Reggio Calabria (1520–1523).

== Biography ==
On 1 October 1520, Pietro Trivulzio was appointed during the papacy of Pope Leo X as Archbishop of Reggio Calabria. He served as Archbishop of Reggio Calabria until his death in 1523.

== External links and additional sources ==
- Cheney, David M. "Archdiocese of Reggio Calabria-Bova". Catholic-Hierarchy.org. (for Chronology of Bishops) ^{[self-published]}
- Chow, Gabriel. "Metropolitan Archdiocese of Reggio Calabria–Bova". GCatholic.org. (for Chronology of Bishops) ^{[self-published]}

Catholic Church titles
Preceded by Agostino Trivulzio	Archbishop of Reggio Calabria; 1520–1523	Succeeded by Agostino Trivulzio
