= Etienne Via =

17th-century Roman Catholic bishop

Most Reverend Etienne Via
- Titular Bishop of Cyrene
- Church: Catholic Church
- In office: 1637–1650
- Predecessor: Tommaso Caracciolo
- Successor: Tommaso Lolli

Personal details
- Born: 1596 Prati de Tuscia, Italy
- Died: 1 September 1650 (aged 53–54)

Etienne Via (1596–1650) was a Roman Catholic prelate who served as Titular Bishop of Cyrene (1637–1650).

== Biography ==
Etienne Via was born in 1596 in Prati de Tuscia, Italy. On 20 April 1637, he was appointed during the papacy of Pope Urban VIII as Titular Bishop of Cyrene. He served as Titular Bishop of Cyrene until his death on 1 September 1650.

== External links and additional sources ==
- Cheney, David M. "Cyrene (Titular See)". Catholic-Hierarchy.org. (for Chronology of Bishops) ^{[self-published]}
- Chow, Gabriel. "Titular Episcopal See of Cyrene (Libya)". GCatholic.org. (for Chronology of Bishops) ^{[self-published]}

Catholic Church titles
Preceded by Tommaso Caracciolo	Titular Bishop of Cyrene; 1637–1650	Succeeded by Tommaso Lolli
