= Ludovico Bonito =

15th-century Roman Catholic cardinal

His Holiness Ludovico Bonito
- Cardinal-Priest of Santa Maria in Trastevere
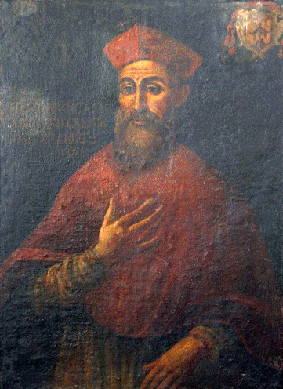
- Church: Catholic Church

Orders
- Created cardinal: 9 May 1408 by Pope Gregory XII
- Rank: Cardinal-Priest

Personal details
- Died: 1413

Ludovico Bonito (died 1413) was a Roman Catholic cardinal.

== Biography ==
On 1 Jun 1387, Ludovico Bonito was appointed during the papacy of Pope Urban VI as Archbishop of Palermo. In 1395, he was transferred by Pope Boniface IX to the Archdiocese of Bar. On Dec 1395, he was named during the papacy of Pope Boniface IX as Titular Archbishop of Thessalonica. On 5 Sep 1399, he was appointed during the papacy of Pope Boniface IX as Archbishop (Personal Title) of Bergamo. On 15 Nov 1400, he was transferred by Pope Boniface IX to the Archdiocese of Pisa. On 29 Jul 1407, he was transferred by Pope Gregory XII to the Archdiocese of Taranto. On 9 May 1408, he was created cardinal priest of Santa Maria in Trastevere by Pope Gregory XII; he kept the administration of his see until 1412. He died in 1413.

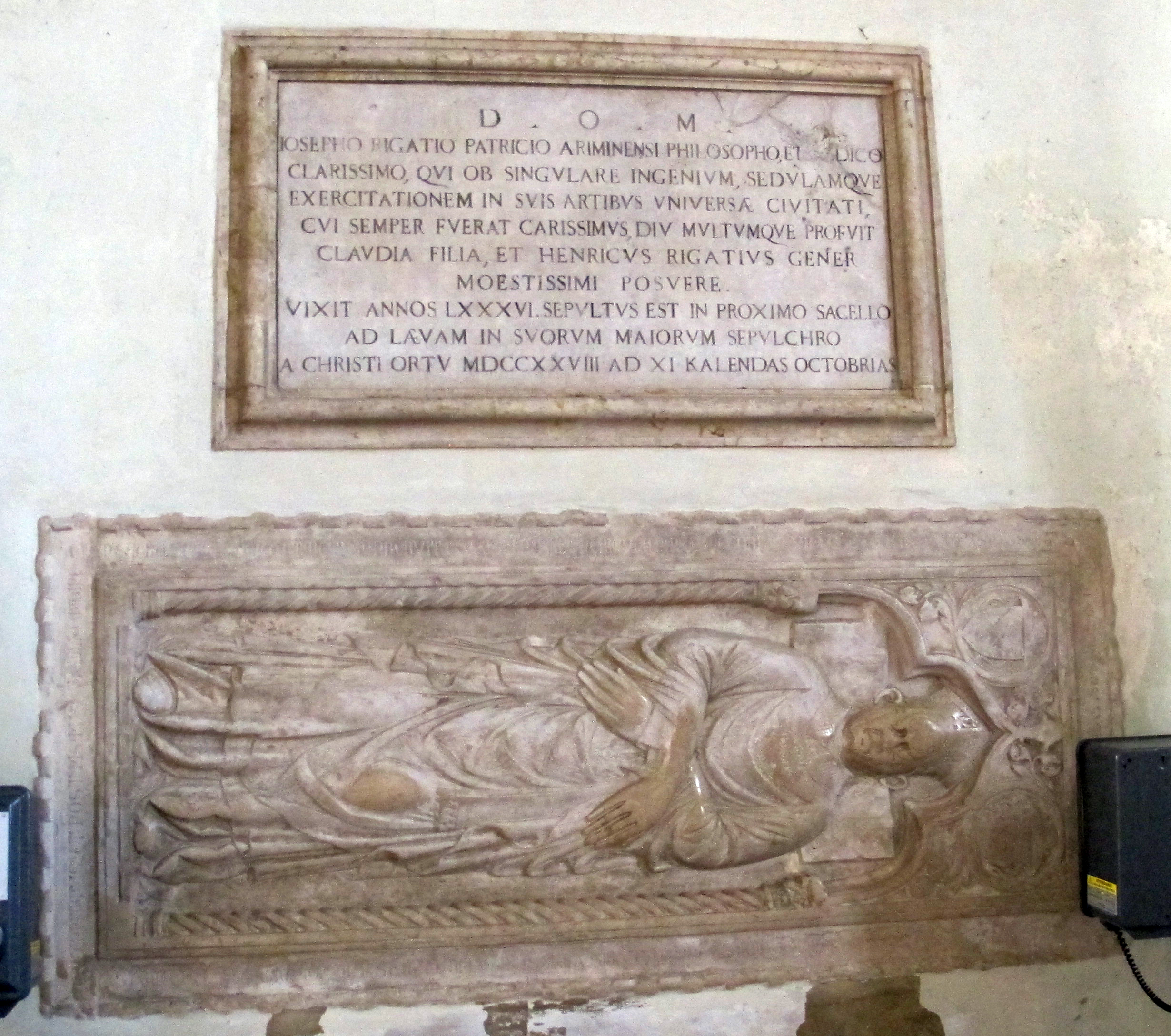
Tomb of Cardinal Bonito in the Tempio Malatestiano

Catholic Church titles
Preceded by Nicolò Montaperto	Archbishop of Palermo; 1387–1395	Succeeded by Gilforte Riccobono
Preceded by Raymundo	Archbishop of Bar; 1395	Succeeded by Marino da Dulcigno
Preceded by	Titular Archbishop of Thessalonica; 1395–1399	Succeeded by
Preceded by Branchinus Besoccio	Archbishop (Personal Title) of Bergamo; 1399–1400	Succeeded by Francesco Lante
Preceded by Joannes Gabrieli	Archbishop of Pisa; 1400–1407	Succeeded by Alamanno Adimari
Preceded by Alamanno Adimari	Archbishop of Taranto; 1407–1412	Succeeded by Rinaldo Brancaccio
Preceded by Rinaldo Brancaccio	Cardinal-Priest of Santa Maria in Trastevere; 1408–1413	Succeeded by Gabriele Condulmer
