= Marco Miroldi =

Most Reverend Marco Miroldi
- Archbishop of Reggio Calabria
- Church: Catholic Church
- Diocese: Archdiocese of Reggio Calabria
- In office: 1491–1495
- Predecessor: Antonio Ricci (archbishop of Reggio Calabria)
- Successor: Pietro Isvales

Personal details
- Died: 1495

Marco Miroldi, O.P. (died 1495) was a Roman Catholic prelate who served as Archbishop of Reggio Calabria (1491–1495).

== Biography ==
Marco Miroldi was ordained a priest in the Order of Preachers. On 4 January 1491, he was appointed during the papacy of Pope Innocent VIII as Archbishop of Reggio Calabria. He served as Archbishop of Reggio Calabria until his death in 1495.

== External links and additional sources ==
- Cheney, David M. "Archdiocese of Reggio Calabria-Bova". Catholic-Hierarchy.org. (for Chronology of Bishops) ^{[self-published]}
- Chow, Gabriel. "Metropolitan Archdiocese of Reggio Calabria–Bova". GCatholic.org. (for Chronology of Bishops) ^{[self-published]}

Catholic Church titles
Preceded by Antonio Ricci (archbishop of Reggio Calabria)	Archbishop of Reggio Calabria; 1491–1495	Succeeded by Pietro Isvales
