= Juan de Castro (bishop of Taranto) =

Italian bishop

Most Reverend Juan de Castro
- Archbishop of Taranto
- Church: Catholic Church
- Archdiocese: Archdiocese of Taranto
- In office: 1600–1601
- Predecessor: Lelio Brancaccio (archbishop)
- Successor: Ottavio Mirto Frangipani

Orders
- Consecration: 1600 by Alfonso Gesualdo di Conza

Personal details
- Died: 11 November 1601 Taranto, Italy

Juan de Castro, O.S.B. (died 1601) was a Roman Catholic prelate who served as Archbishop of Taranto (1600–1601).

== Biography ==
Juan de Castro was ordained a priest in the Order of Saint Benedict. On 20 March 1600, he was appointed during the papacy of Pope Clement VIII as Archbishop of Taranto. he was consecrated bishop by Alfonso Gesualdo di Conza, Archbishop of Naples. He served as Archbishop of Taranto until his death on 11 November 1601.

Catholic Church titles
Preceded by Lelio Brancaccio (archbishop)	Archbishop of Taranto; 1600–1601	Succeeded by Ottavio Mirto Frangipani
