= Guglielmo Logoteta =

Most Reverend Guglielmo Logoteta
- Archbishop of Reggio Calabria
- Church: Catholic Church
- Diocese: Archdiocese of Reggio Calabria
- In office: 1440–1449
- Predecessor: Paolo di Segni
- Successor: Angelo de Grassis

Personal details
- Died: 1449

Guglielmo Logoteta (died 1449) was a Roman Catholic prelate who served as Archbishop of Reggio Calabria (1440–1449).

== Biography ==
On 18 May 1440, Guglielmo Logoteta was appointed during the papacy of Pope Eugene IV as Archbishop of Reggio Calabria. He served as Archbishop of Reggio Calabria until his death in 1449.

While bishop, he was the principal consecrator of John Drene, Bishop of Caithness (1447).

== External links and additional sources ==
- Cheney, David M. "Archdiocese of Reggio Calabria-Bova". Catholic-Hierarchy.org. (for Chronology of Bishops) ^{[self-published]}
- Chow, Gabriel. "Metropolitan Archdiocese of Reggio Calabria–Bova". GCatholic.org. (for Chronology of Bishops) ^{[self-published]}

Catholic Church titles
Preceded by Paolo di Segni	Archbishop of Reggio Calabria; 1440–1449	Succeeded by Angelo de Grassis
