= Tommaso Lolli =

17th-century Roman Catholic bishop

Most Reverend Tommaso Lolli
- Titular Bishop of Cyrene
- Church: Catholic Church
- In office: 1650–1667
- Predecessor: Etienne Via
- Successor: Mario Fani

Orders
- Consecration: 9 Oct 1650 by Giovanni Giacomo Panciroli

Personal details
- Died: 21 March 1667

Tommaso Lolli or Thomas Lolli (died 1667) was a Roman Catholic prelate who served as Titular Bishop of Cyrene (1650–1667).

== Biography ==
Tommaso Lolli was a professed religious of the Order of Clerics Regular Minor.

On 19 Sep 1650, Tommaso Lolli was appointed during the papacy of Pope Innocent X as Titular Bishop of Cyrene. On 9 Oct 1650, he was consecrated bishop by Giovanni Giacomo Panciroli, Cardinal-Priest of Santo Stefano al Monte Celio, with Luca Torreggiani, Archbishop of Ravenna, and Pedro Urbina Montoya, Archbishop of Valencia, serving as co-consecrators. He served as Titular Bishop of Cyrene until his death on 21 Mar 1667.

== External links and additional sources ==
- Cheney, David M. "Cyrene (Titular See)". Catholic-Hierarchy.org. (for Chronology of Bishops) ^{[self-published]}
- Chow, Gabriel. "Titular Episcopal See of Cyrene (Libya)". GCatholic.org. (for Chronology of Bishops) ^{[self-published]}

Catholic Church titles
Preceded by Etienne Via	Titular Bishop of Cyrene; 1650–1667	Succeeded by Mario Fani
