= Francesco Isvales =

Most Reverend Francesco Isvales
- Archbishop of Reggio Calabria
- Church: Catholic Church
- Diocese: Archdiocese of Reggio Calabria
- In office: 1506–1512
- Predecessor: Pietro Isvales
- Successor: Roberto Latino Orsini

Personal details
- Died: 1512

Francesco Isvales (died 1512) was a Roman Catholic prelate who served as Archbishop of Reggio Calabria (1506–1512).

On 24 July 1506, Francesco Isvales was appointed during the papacy of Pope Julius II as Archbishop of Reggio Calabria. He served as Archbishop of Reggio Calabria until his death in 1512.

== External links and additional sources ==
- Cheney, David M. "Archdiocese of Reggio Calabria-Bova". Catholic-Hierarchy.org. (for Chronology of Bishops) ^{[self-published]}
- Chow, Gabriel. "Metropolitan Archdiocese of Reggio Calabria–Bova". GCatholic.org. (for Chronology of Bishops) ^{[self-published]}

Catholic Church titles
Preceded by Pietro Isvales	Archbishop of Reggio Calabria; 1506–1512	Succeeded by Roberto Latino Orsini
