= Girolamo Centelles =

Roman Catholic archbishop

Most Reverend Girolamo Centelles
- Archbishop of Reggio Calabria
- Church: Catholic Church
- Archdiocese: Archdiocese of Reggio Calabria
- In office: 1529–1535
- Predecessor: Agostino Trivulzio
- Successor: Agostino Gonzaga

Orders
- Consecration: 17 August 1529 by Gabriele Mascioli Foschi

Girolamo Centelles was a Roman Catholic prelate who was Archbishop of Reggio Calabria (1529–1535).

== Biography ==
On 16 July 1529, during the papacy of Pope Clement VII, Girolamo Centelles was appointed Archbishop of Reggio Calabria. On 17 August 1529, he was consecrated bishop by Gabriele Mascioli Foschi, Archbishop of Durrës. He was Archbishop of Reggio Calabria until his resignation in 1535.

== External links and additional sources ==
- Cheney, David M. "Archdiocese of Reggio Calabria-Bova". Catholic-Hierarchy.org. (for Chronology of Bishops) ^{[self-published]}
- Chow, Gabriel. "Metropolitan Archdiocese of Reggio Calabria–Bova". GCatholic.org. (for Chronology of Bishops) ^{[self-published]}

Catholic Church titles
| Preceded by Agostino Trivulzio | Archbishop of Reggio Calabria; 1529–1535 | Succeeded by Agostino Gonzaga |
