= Angelo de Grassis =

Most Reverend Angelo de Grassis
- Archbishop of Reggio Calabria
- Church: Catholic Church
- Diocese: Archdiocese of Reggio Calabria
- In office: 1449–1453
- Predecessor: Guglielmo Logoteta
- Successor: Antonio Ricci (archbishop of Reggio Calabria)

Personal details
- Died: 1449

Angelo de Grassis (died 1449) was a Roman Catholic prelate who served as Archbishop of Reggio Calabria (1449–1453).

== Biography ==
On 30 April 1449, Angelo de Grassis was appointed during the papacy of Pope Nicholas V as Archbishop of Reggio Calabria. He served as Archbishop of Reggio Calabria until his death in 1453.

== See also ==
- Catholic Church in Italy

== External links and additional sources ==
- Cheney, David M. "Archdiocese of Reggio Calabria-Bova". Catholic-Hierarchy.org. (for Chronology of Bishops) ^{[self-published]}
- Chow, Gabriel. "Metropolitan Archdiocese of Reggio Calabria–Bova". GCatholic.org. (for Chronology of Bishops) ^{[self-published]}

Catholic Church titles
Preceded by Guglielmo Logoteta	Archbishop of Reggio Calabria; 1449–1453	Succeeded by Antonio Ricci (archbishop of Reggio Calabria)
