= Agostino Gonzaga =

Roman Catholic archbishop

Most Reverend Agostino Gonzaga
- Archbishop of Reggio Calabria
- Church: Catholic Church
- Diocese: Archdiocese of Reggio Calabria
- In office: 1537–1557
- Predecessor: Girolamo Centelles
- Successor: Gaspare Ricciullo del Fosso

Personal details
- Died: 1557

Agostino Gonzaga (died 1557) was a Roman Catholic prelate who served as Archbishop of Reggio Calabria (1537–1557).

== Biography ==
On 11 April 1537, Agostino Gonzaga was appointed during the papacy of Pope Paul III as Archbishop of Reggio Calabria. He served as Archbishop of Reggio Calabria until his death in 1557.

== External links and additional sources ==
- Cheney, David M. "Archdiocese of Reggio Calabria-Bova". Catholic-Hierarchy.org. (for Chronology of Bishops) ^{[self-published]}
- Chow, Gabriel. "Metropolitan Archdiocese of Reggio Calabria–Bova". GCatholic.org. (for Chronology of Bishops) ^{[self-published]}

Catholic Church titles
| Preceded by Girolamo Centelles | Archbishop of Reggio Calabria; 1537–1557 | Succeeded by Gaspare Ricciullo del Fosso |
