= Antonio Ricci (archbishop of Reggio Calabria) =

Most Reverend Antonio Ricci
- Archbishop of Reggio Calabria
- Church: Catholic Church
- Diocese: Archdiocese of Reggio Calabria
- In office: 1453–1488
- Predecessor: Angelo de Grassis
- Successor: Marco Miroldi

Personal details
- Died: 1488

Antonio Ricci (died 1488) was a Roman Catholic prelate who served as Archbishop of Reggio Calabria (1453–1488).

== Biography ==
On 4 June 1453, Antonio Ricci was appointed during the papacy of Pope Nicholas V as Archbishop of Reggio Calabria. He served as Archbishop of Reggio Calabria until his death in 1488.

== External links and additional sources ==
- Cheney, David M. "Archdiocese of Reggio Calabria-Bova". Catholic-Hierarchy.org. (for Chronology of Bishops) ^{[self-published]}
- Chow, Gabriel. "Metropolitan Archdiocese of Reggio Calabria–Bova". GCatholic.org. (for Chronology of Bishops) ^{[self-published]}

Catholic Church titles
Preceded by Angelo de Grassis	Archbishop of Reggio Calabria; 1453–1488	Succeeded by Marco Miroldi
