= Girolamo di Corregio =

Italian Roman Catholic cardinal and bishop

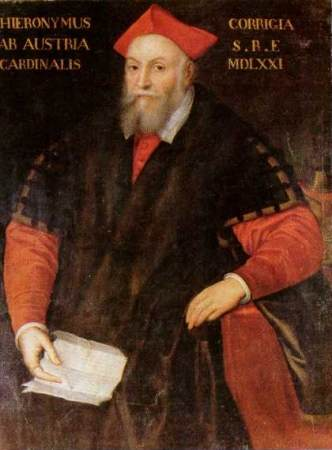
Girolamo di Corregio

Girolamo di Corregio (1511–1572) was an Italian Roman Catholic cardinal and bishop.

== Biography ==
Girolamo di Corregio was born in Correggio, Emilia-Romagna in 1511, the son of Giberto X, Count of Correggio and his wife Veronica Gambara. His mother was the sister of Cardinal Uberto Gambara.

After studying at the University of Bologna, he moved to Rome and entered ecclesiastical life under the tutelage of his uncle Cardinal Uberto Gambara. In 1545, Pope Paul III made him nuncio extraordinary to Francis I of France to express condolences for the death of Francis' son Charles II de Valois, Duke of Orléans. The next year he was nuncio extraordinary before Charles V, Holy Roman Emperor. He then entered the court of Cardinal Alessandro Farnese. In 1551, he became minister plenipotentiary to Ottavio Farnese, Duke of Parma. He was later despatched to treat with Philip II of Spain to restore Piacenza to the Duchy of Parma; because of his success, the Duke of Parma gave him castles in Medesano and Correggio.

Pope Pius IV made him a cardinal deacon in the consistory of 262 February 1561; he was promoted to the order of cardinal priests on 2 June 1561. He received the red hat and the titular church of San Giovanni a Porta Latina on 3 June 1561. On 5 May 1562 he opted for the titular church of Santo Stefano Rotondo. He participated in the papal conclave of 1565-66 that elected Pope Pius V. On 14 May 1568 he opted for the titular church of San Martino ai Monti.

He was elected Archbishop of Taranto on 13 May 1569. On 22 January 1570 he was consecrated as a bishop in the Sistine Chapel by Cardinal Otto Truchsess von Waldburg, Prince-Bishop of Augsburg, assisted by Antonio Helius, titular patriarch of Jerusalem, and Marcantonio Maffei, Archbishop of Chieti.

He opted for the titular church of Santa Prisca on 9 June 1570 and then for Sant'Anastasia on 3 July 1570. He participated in the papal conclave of 1572 that elected Pope Gregory XIII. In 1572, he was extraordinary legate responsible for fortifying Ancona against the maritime threat from the Ottoman Empire.

He died in Rome on 9 October 1572. He was buried in San Silvestro al Quirinale.
