= Giovanni d'Aragona (1456–1485) =

Italian cardinal

- Administrator of Taranto
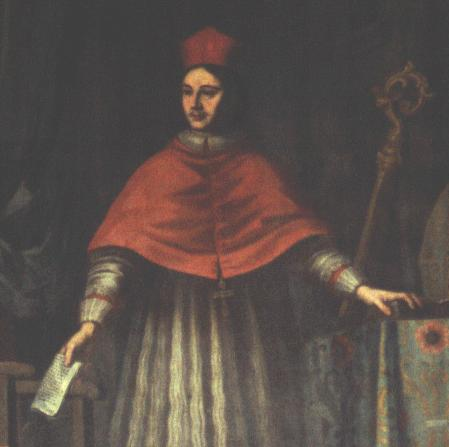
- Work by an unknown Southern Italian artist, 17th–18th centuries, at the Archbishop's Palace in Taranto
- Church: Catholic Church
- See: Taranto
- In office: 10 November 1477 – 17 October 1485
- Predecessor: Latino Orsini
- Successor: Giovanni Battista Petrucci
- Other posts: Cardinal-Priest of Sant'Adriano al Foro (1480-1485); Administrator of Cosenza (1481-1485); Administrator of Salerno (1483-1485); Cardinal-Priest of San Lorenzo in Lucina (1483-1485); Administrator of Esztergom (1484-1485)
- Previous posts: Cardinal-Deacon of Sant’Adriano al Foro (1477-1480); Administrator of Badajoz (1479)

Orders
- Created cardinal: 10 December 1477 by Pope Sixtus IV

Personal details
- Born: 25 June 1456 Naples, Kingdom of Naples, Crown of Aragon
- Died: 17 October 1485 (aged 29) Rome, Papal States
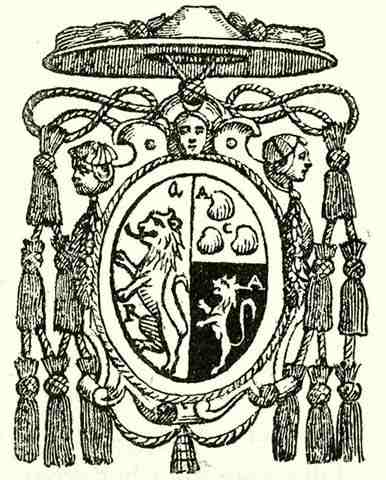
- Coat of arms

Giovanni d'Aragona (25 June 1456 – 17 October 1485) (also called the Cardinal of Aragona) was an Italian Roman Catholic cardinal.

== Biography ==
D'Aragona was born in Naples on 25 June 1456, the son of Ferdinand I of Naples and his wife Isabella of Clermont.

He became a protonotary apostolic on 12 July 1465. On 10 November 1477, he was named apostolic administrator of the see of Taranto, a post he held for the rest of his life.

In the consistory of 10 December 1477, Pope Sixtus IV made him a cardinal deacon. He received the deaconry of Sant'Adriano al Foro on 12 December 1477. The pope sent him the red hat in Naples three months later.

He served as apostolic administrator of the see of Badajoz from 20 January 1479, to 14 May 1479. On 10 April 1479, the pope named him legate a latere to the Kingdom of Hungary; he left Rome for his legation on 31 January 1480, and returned on 31 August 1480. On 14 January 1480, he opted for the order of cardinal priests and his deaconry of Sant'Adriano al Foro was raised pro illa vice to titulus.

On 14 November 1481, he was named apostolic administrator of the metropolitan see of Cosenza, a post he held for the rest of his life. He was in Naples from 23 April 1482, until 30 August 1483, when he returned to Rome. He became apostolic administrator of the metropolitan see of Salerno on 13 January 1483, and of the metropolitan see of Esztergom on 20 December 1483, and held both of those offices until his death as well.

On 10 September 1483, he was named papal legate to Hungary and Germany. He returned to Rome on 19 August 1484, in order to participate in the papal conclave of 1484 that elected Pope Innocent VIII.

His father, the king of Naples, then named him governor and viceroy of the Province of Bari. In early October 1485, his father despatched him on a mission to the pope. He arrived in Rome in the midst of a serious epidemic and soon died of fever on 17 October 1485. He is buried in Santa Sabina.
