= Archdiocese of Taranto =

Latin Catholic archdiocese in Italy

Coordinates: 40.4181°N 17.2408°E

Archdiocese of Taranto Archidioecesis Tarentina

Catholic
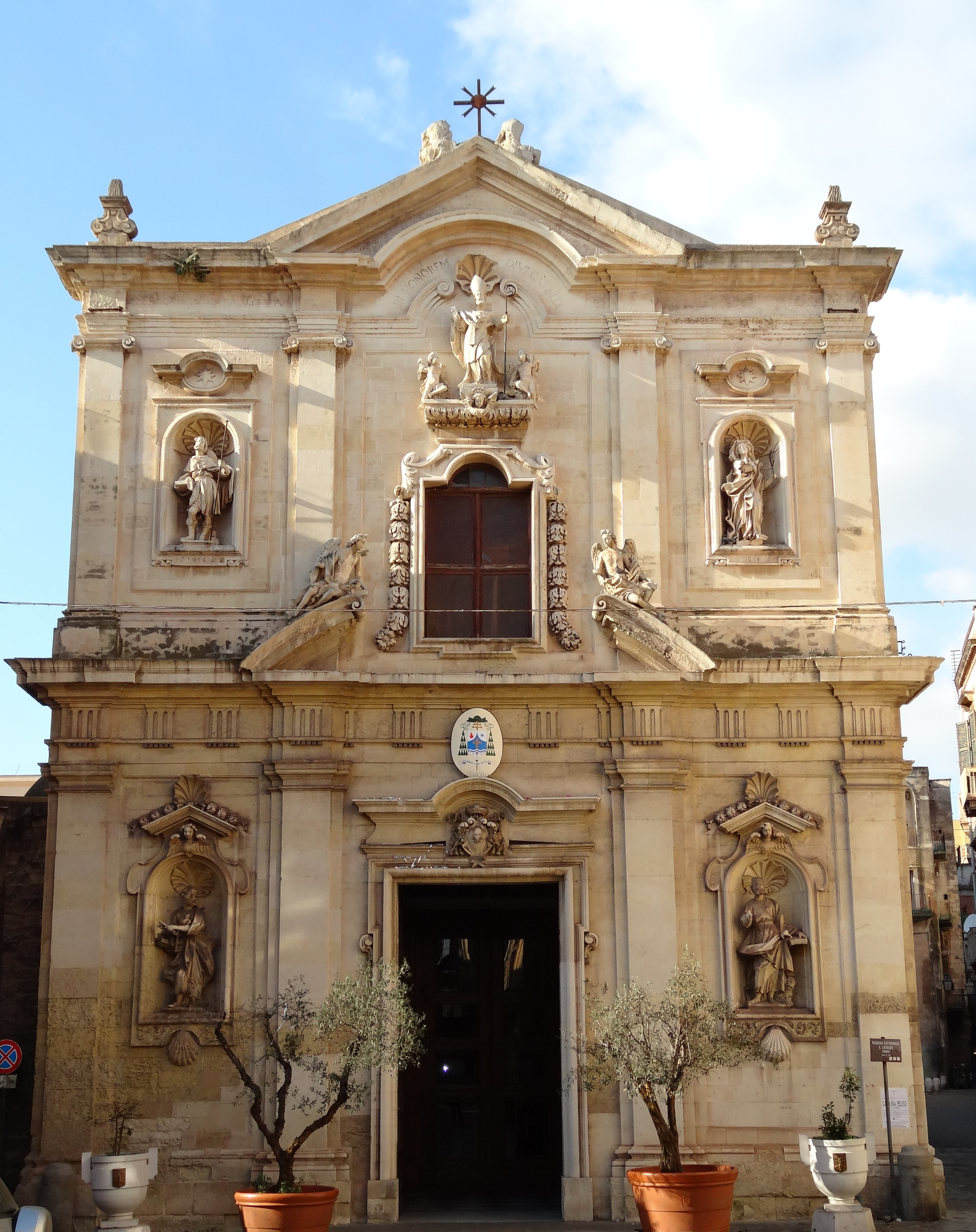
- Cathedral of Saint Catald in Taranto

Location
- Country: Italy
- Ecclesiastical province: Taranto

Statistics
- Area: 1,056 km^{2} (408 sq mi)
- Population: Total; Catholics: (as of 2014); 412,500; 415,500 (est.) (99.3%)
- Parishes: 88

Information
- Denomination: Catholic Church
- Sui iuris church: Latin Church
- Rite: Roman Rite
- Established: 6th century
- Cathedral: Basilica Cattedrale di S. Cataldo
- Secular priests: 155 (diocesan); 65 (Religious Orders)

Current leadership
- Pope: Leo XIV
- Archbishop: Ciro Miniero
- Episcopal Vicars: Alessandro Greco
- Bishops emeritus: Filippo Santoro

Map
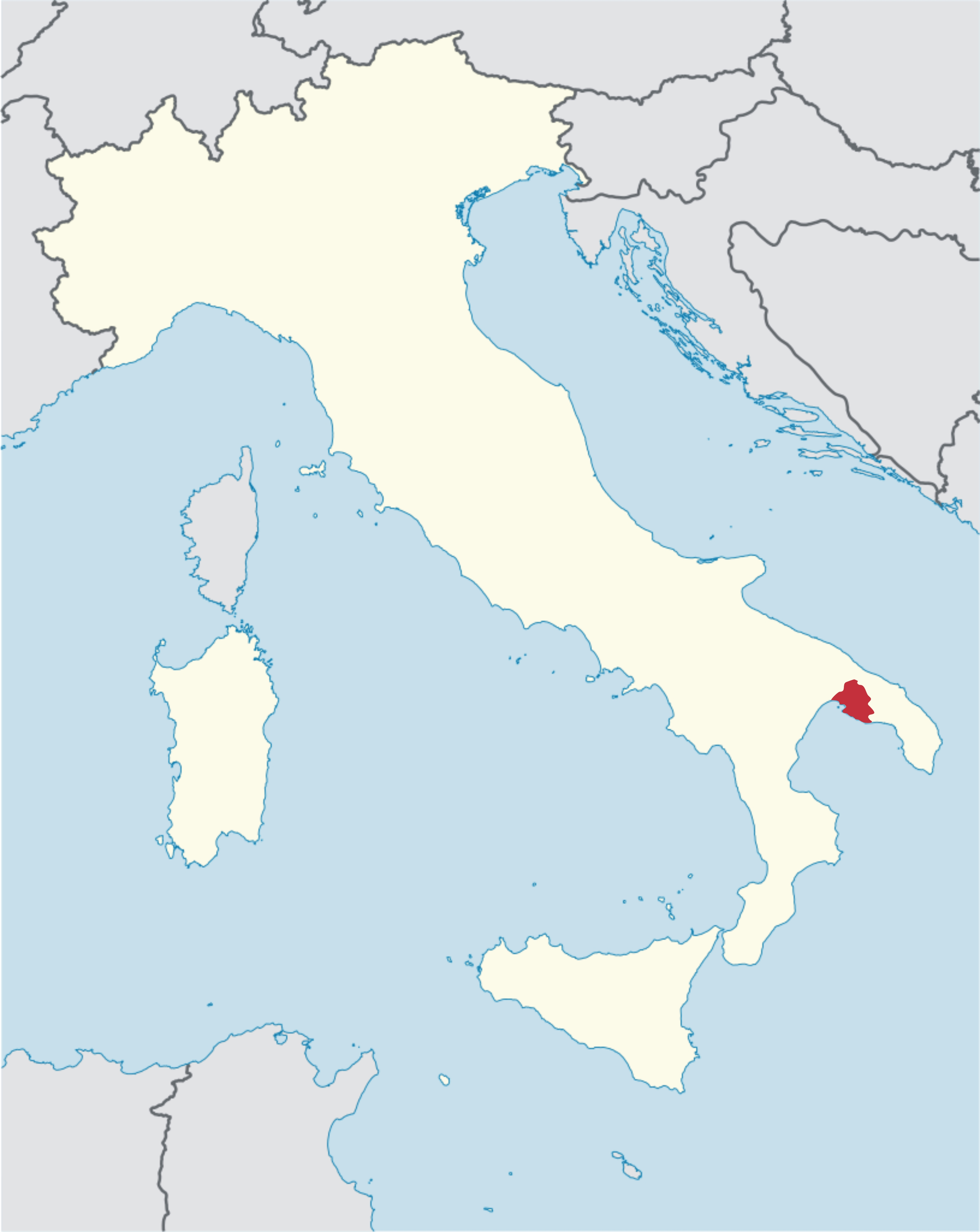

Website
- diocesi.taranto.it

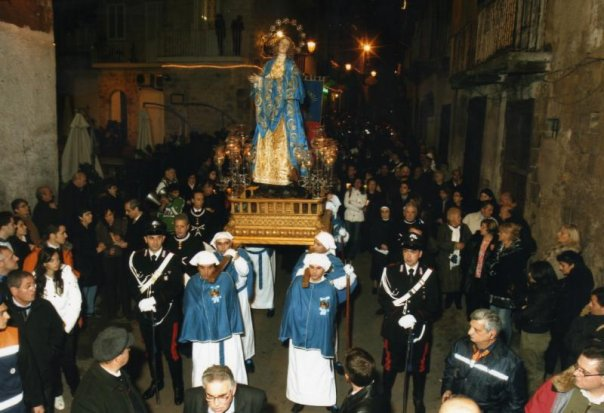
Immaculate Conception parade in Taranto, 2006

The Archdiocese of Taranto (Latin: Archidioecesis Tarentina) is a Latin Church archdiocese of the Catholic Church in southern Italy, on a bay in the Gulf of Taranto.

Its suffragan sees are the dioceses of Castellaneta and Oria.

== History ==
In a local Tarantine legend, according to a document of the 11th or 12th century, the Gospel was preached in Taranto by St. Peter the Apostle. He had arrived in the city in AD 45, along with Saint Mark, on their way to Rome. Amasianus was a gardener or greengrocer, whom Peter converted to Christianity. It is only much later that the Tarentines claim that Amasianus was consecrated a bishop. It is also stated that St. Cataldus was consecrated by St. Peter the Apostle. The real Cataldus was an Irish bishop from Rachau (or Rachan) of the 6th century, who happened to die in Taranto during his pilgrimage to the Holy Land.

The city also honors the martyr St. Orontius. Orontius, the son of an imperial treasurer, had been converted to Christianity by Justus, a disciple of St. Paul, who had landed at the port of Saint Cataldus and preached to the population in the locality of Lecce in the time of Nero, despite harassment by imperial officials. They returned to Corinth, where St. Paul consecrated Orontius the first bishop of Lecce, and the party returned to Lecce to continue their evangelization.

The first bishop whose date is known is Petrus (not Innocentius) (496). In the pontificate of St. Gregory the Great (590–604), the names of three bishops who filled the episcopal chair are known: Andreas (590), Joannes (601), and Honorius (603). Archbishop Joannes (978) is the first who had the title of archbishop.

Even under the Byzantines, Taranto never adopted the Greek Rite. Stephanus perished in the battle of Nelfi (1041) fought by the Greeks and the Normans. Draco (1071) erected the cathedral. Filippo (1138) was deposed for supporting the antipope Anacletus II and died in the monastery of Chiaravalle. Archbishop Angelo was employed in several embassies by Innocent III. Jacopo da Atri was slain in 1370. Marino del Giudice (1371) was one of the cardinals condemned by pope Urban VI in 1385.

Cardinal Ludovico Bonito (1406) was one of the few who remained faithful to Gregory XII. Cardinal Giovanni d'Aragona (1478) was the son of King Ferdinand I of Naples. Giovanni Battista Petrucci suffered for the complicity of his father in the conspiracy of the barons. Cardinal Battista Orsini died in 1503 in the Castle of Sant' Angelo.

Cardinal Marcantonio Colonna (1560) introduced the Tridentine reforms and established the seminary. Girolamo Gambara (1569) was a distinguished nuncio. Lelio Brancaccio (1574) suffered considerable persecution on account of his efforts at reformation. Tommaso Caracciolo (1630), a Theatine, was reported to have died in the odour of sanctity.

=== Early 20th century ===
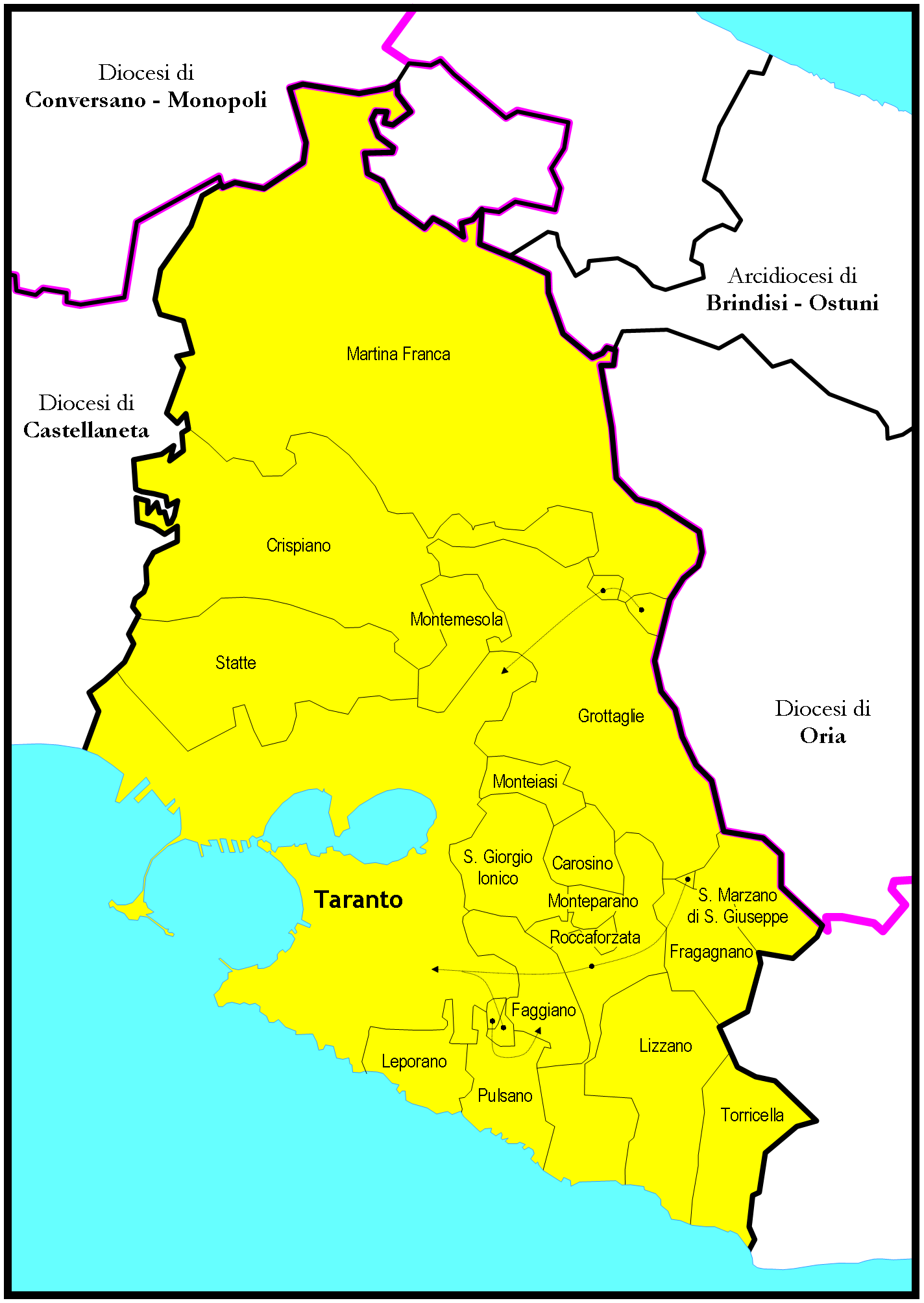
Map of the archdiocese with parishes

The city of Taranto forms a single parish divided into four pittagerii, each of which contains a sub-pittagerio. It includes the Basilian Abbey of S. Maria di Talfano, where there are still some Albanians following the Greek Rite.

== Bishops ==
Diocese of Taranto

Erected: 5th century
Latin Name: Tarentinus

- Petrus (attested 494)
- Andreas (attested 593)
- Joannes
- Honorius (attested 603)
- Joannes (attested 649)
- Gervasius
- Germanus (attested 680)
- Caesarius (attested 743)

...

Archdiocese of Taranto

Elevated: 10th century
Latin Name: Tarentinus

=== from 978 to 1400 ===
- Joannes (attested 978)
- Dionysius (983)
- Alexander Facciapecora
- Stephanus
- Draso (Drago) (attested 1071)
- Ursus
- Basilius
- Albertus
- Jacobus
- Stephanus Philamarinus
- Moraldus (Monaldus)

...

- Gervasius (attested 1187–1193)
- Angelus (1194 – 1200)

Sede Vacante (by 28 July 1200 – January 1202)

- Geraldus (attested 1202)
- Nicolaus (attested 1205)
- Berardus (attested 1205, 1210, 1211)
- Ignotus (1215)
- Gualterus (attested 1216 – March 1218)
- Nicolaus (10 May 1219 – 20 August 1247)

Sede Vacante (8 August 1249 – 25 March 1252)

- Henricus de Carasolo (25 March 1252 – 22 July 1274)

[Jacobus de Viterbio was not an archbishop]

Sede Vacante (20 October 1274 – 3 December 1275)

- Henricus de Carasolo, again (12 March 1276 – 20 April 1297)
- Gualterius (22 June 1299 – 1301)
- Gregorius, O.P. (1301 – 1334)
- Rogerius Capitignonas (26 April 1334 – 1348)
- Bertrand de Castronovo (de Chateauneuf) (1348 – 7 Jan 1349)
- Jacobus (7 January 1349 – 1378)
- Martinus (20 November 1381 – 1384) (Avignon Obedience)
- Matthaeus (28 May 1384 – after 1394) (Avignon Obedience)
- Marinus del Judice (by 4 June 1380 – c. 1382/1385) (Roman Obedience)
- Pierre Amelli, O.S.A. (c. 1386 – 12 Nov 1387)
- Petrus (12 April 1389 – 1391?)
- Elziarius (27 June 1391 – )
- Bartolommeo d'Aprano ( – 17 March 1400) (Roman Obedience)

=== from 1400 to 1600 ===
- Jacobus Palladini (24 March 1400 – 16 November 1401)
- Alamanno Adimari (16 Nov 1401 – 3 Nov 1406)
- Cardinal Ludovico Bonito (Ludovicus Bonitus) (29 July 1407 – 1412?)
- Cardinal Rinaldo Brancaccio (3 Jul 1412 – 1420 Resigned) (Administrator)
- Giovanni Berardi de Tagliacozzi (20 Oct 1421 – 8 Jan 1440)
- Giuliano Cesarini (Sr.) (1440 – 7 Mar 1444) (Administrator)
- Marino Orsini (30 July 1445 – 1472)
- Latino Orsini (30 Oct 1472 – 11 Aug 1477 Died)
- Giovanni d'Aragona (10 Nov 1477 – 17 Oct 1485 Died)
- Giovanni Battista Petrucci (Petruzzi) (17 Nov 1485 – 26 Oct 1489 Appointed, Archbishop (Personal Title) of Teramo)
- Francesco de Perez (26 Oct 1489 – 1491 Died)
- Giovanni Battista Orsini (5 Nov 1490 – 24 Sep 1498 Resigned)
- Enrico Bruno, O.P. (24 Sep 1498 – 1509 Died)
- Orlando Carretto della Rovere (10 Oct 1509 – 24 Apr 1510 Appointed, Titular Archbishop of Nazareth)
- Giovanni Maria Poderico (24 Apr 1510 – 1524 Died)
- Francesco Armellini Pantalassi de' Medici (15 Dec 1525 – Oct 1527 Died)
- Girolamo d'Ippolito, O.P. (18 Jan 1528 – Aug 1528 Died)
- Antonio Sanseverino, O.S.Io.Hieros. (31 Aug 1528 – 17 Aug 1543 Died)
- Francesco Colonna (22 Oct 1544 – 1560 Died)
- Marcantonio Colonna (Sr.) (9 Jul 1560 – 13 Oct 1568 Appointed, Archbishop of Salerno)
- Girolamo di Corregio (13 May 1569 – 9 Oct 1572 Died)
- Lelio Brancaccio (archbishop) (15 Nov 1574 – 1599 Died)

=== from 1600 to 1800 ===
- Juan de Castro (bishop of Taranto), O.S.B. (20 Mar 1600 – 11 Nov 1601 Died)
- Ottavio Mirto Frangipani (20 Jun 1605 – 24 Jul 1612)
- Bonifazio Caetani (22 Apr 1613 – 24 Jun 1617 Died)
- Antonio d'Aquino (23 Jul 1618 – 27 Aug 1627 Died)
- Francisco Sánchez Villanueva y Vega (24 Jan 1628 Confirmed – 23 Sep 1630 Appointed, Archbishop (Personal Title) of Mazara del Vallo)
- Cardinal Gil Carrillo de Albornoz (Aegidius Albornotius) (23 Sep 1630 – 30 Mar 1637 Resigned)
- Tommaso Caracciolo, C.R. (30 Mar 1637 Confirmed – 1665 Died)
- Tommaso de Sarria, O.P. (13 Apr 1665 – 5 Nov 1682 Died)
- Francesco Pignatelli (Sr.), C.R. (27 Sep 1683 – 19 Feb 1703)

Sede vacante (1703–1713)

- Giovanni Battista Stella (30 Aug 1713 – Dec 1725 Died)
- Giovanni Fabrizio de Capua (22 Dec 1727 – 11 Dec 1730)
- Celestino Galiano, O.S.B. (30 Apr 1731 Confirmed – 31 Mar 1732 Resigned)
- Casimiro Rossi (19 Jan 1733 Confirmed – 5 May 1738)
- Giovanni Rossi, C.R. (21 May 1738 – 20 Feb 1750)
- Antonino Sersale (16 Nov 1750 – 11 Feb 1754)
- Isidoro Sánchez de Luna, O.S.B. (22 Apr 1754 – 28 May 1759)
- Francesco Saverio Mastrilli, C.R. (13 Jul 1759 – Oct 1777)
- Giuseppe Capecelatro (30 Mar 1778 – 28 Mar 1817 Resigned)

=== since 1800 ===
- Giovanni Antonio de Fulgure, C.M. (25 May 1818 – 6 Jan 1833 Died)
- Raffaele Blundo (6 Apr 1835 – 20 Jun 1855 Died)
- Giuseppe Rotondo (Rotundo) (17 Dec 1855 – 20 Jan 1885 Died)
- Pietro Alfonso Jorio (Iorio) (27 Mar 1885 – 15 Nov 1908 Resigned)
- Carlo Giuseppe Cecchini, O.P. (4 Dec 1909 – 17 Dec 1916 Died)
- Orazio Mazzella (14 Apr 1917 – 1 Nov 1934 Resigned)
- Ferdinando Bernardi (21 Jan 1935 – 18 Nov 1961 Died)
- Guglielmo Motolese (16 Jan 1962 – 10 Oct 1987 Retired)
- Salvatore De Giorgi (10 Oct 1987 – 11 May 1990 Resigned)
- Benigno Luigi Papa, O.F.M. Cap. (11 May 1990 – 21 Nov 2011 Retired)
- Filippo Santoro (21 Nov 2011 – )

=== Auxiliary bishop ===
- Guglielmo Motolese (1952-1962), appointed Archbishop here

=== Other priest of this diocese who became bishop ===
- Angelo Raffaele Panzetta, appointed Archbishop of Crotone-Santa Severina in 2019

== See also ==
- History of Taranto
- Timeline of Taranto

== Books ==
=== Reference Works ===
- Eubel, Conradus, ed. (1913). Hierarchia catholica, Tomus 1 (second ed.). Münster: Libreria Regensbergiana. (in Latin)
- Eubel, Conradus, ed. (1914). Hierarchia catholica, Tomus 2 (second ed.). Münster: Libreria Regensbergiana. (in Latin)
- Eubel, Conradus, ed. (1923). Hierarchia catholica, Tomus 3 (second ed.). Münster: Libreria Regensbergiana.
- Gams, Pius Bonifatius (1873). Series episcoporum Ecclesiae catholicae: quotquot innotuerunt a beato Petro apostolo. Ratisbon: Typis et Sumptibus Georgii Josephi Manz. pp. 946–947. (Use with caution; obsolete)
- Gauchat, Patritius (Patrice) (1935). Hierarchia catholica IV (1592-1667). Münster: Libraria Regensbergiana. (in Latin)
- Ritzler, Remigius; Sefrin, Pirminus (1952). Hierarchia catholica medii et recentis aevi V (1667-1730). Patavii: Messagero di S. Antonio. (in Latin)
- Ritzler, Remigius; Sefrin, Pirminus (1958). Hierarchia catholica medii et recentis aevi VI (1730-1799). Patavii: Messagero di S. Antonio. (in Latin)
- Ritzler, Remigius; Sefrin, Pirminus (1968). Hierarchia Catholica medii et recentioris aevi sive summorum pontificum, S. R. E. cardinalium, ecclesiarum antistitum series... A pontificatu Pii PP. VII (1800) usque ad pontificatum Gregorii PP. XVI (1846) (in Latin). Vol. VII. Monasterii: Libr. Regensburgiana.
- Ritzler, Remigius; Pirminus Sefrin (1978). Hierarchia catholica Medii et recentioris aevi... A Pontificatu PII PP. IX (1846) usque ad Pontificatum Leonis PP. XIII (1903) (in Latin). Vol. VIII. Il Messaggero di S. Antonio.
- Pięta, Zenon (2002). Hierarchia catholica medii et recentioris aevi... A pontificatu Pii PP. X (1903) usque ad pontificatum Benedictii PP. XV (1922) (in Latin). Vol. IX. Padua: Messagero di San Antonio. ISBN 978-88-250-1000-8.

=== Studies ===
- Avino, Vincenzio d' (1848). Cenni storici sulle chiese arcivescovili, vescovili, e prelatizie (nullius) del regno delle due Sicilie (in Italian). Naples: dalle stampe di Ranucci. pp. 511–515.
- Bianchi, Roberto; Angelo Carmelo Bello (2003). Il movimento riformatore cattolico nell 'Arcidiocesi di Taranto durante l'episcopato di Monsignor Pietro Alfonso Jorio (1885-1908), Edizioni Pugliesi, Martina Franca, 2003.
- Cappelletti, Giuseppe (1870). Le chiese d'Italia dalla loro origine sino ai nostri giorni (in Italian). Vol. vigesimoprimo (21). Venezia: Antonelli. pp. 141–144.
- De Marco, Vittorio (1988). La Diocesi di Taranto nell'età moderna (1560-1713) (in Italian). Rome: Ed. di Storia e Letteratura. GGKEY:R4R9HWTHLP2.
- De Marco, Vittorio (1990). La diocese di Taranto nel Settocento (1713–1816). Roma: Storia e lettere. (in Italian)
- Gentilcore, David (1992). From Bishop to Witch: The System of the Sacred in Early Modern Terra D'Otranto. Manchester University Press. pp. 31–33, 110–111, 210–213, 245–252. ISBN 978-0-7190-3640-8.
- Kehr, Paulus Fridolin (1962). Italia pontificia. Regesta pontificum Romanorum. Vol. IX: Samnium–Apulia–Lucanium. Berlin: Weidmann, pp. 383–396.
- Lanzoni, Francesco (1927). Le diocesi d'Italia dalle origini al principio del secolo VII (an. 604) (in Italian). Rome: Biblioteca Apostolica Vaticana. pp. 312–317.
- Loud, G. A. (2007). The Latin Church in Norman Italy. Cambridge University Press. ISBN 978-1-107-32000-0.
- Loud, Graham (2014). The Age of Robert Guiscard: Southern Italy and the Northern Conquest. New York: Routledge. ISBN 978-1-317-90023-8.
- Ughelli, Ferdinando; Coleti, Niccolo (1721). Italia Sacra Sive De Episcopis Italiae, Et Insularum adiacentium (in Latin). Vol. Tomus nonus (9). Venice: Antonio Coleti.
