= Archdiocese of Reggio Calabria-Bova =

Latin Catholic archdiocese in Italy

Coordinates: 38°06′29″N 15°38′40″E

Archdiocese of Reggio Calabria-Bova Archidioecesis Rheginensis-Bovensis

Catholic
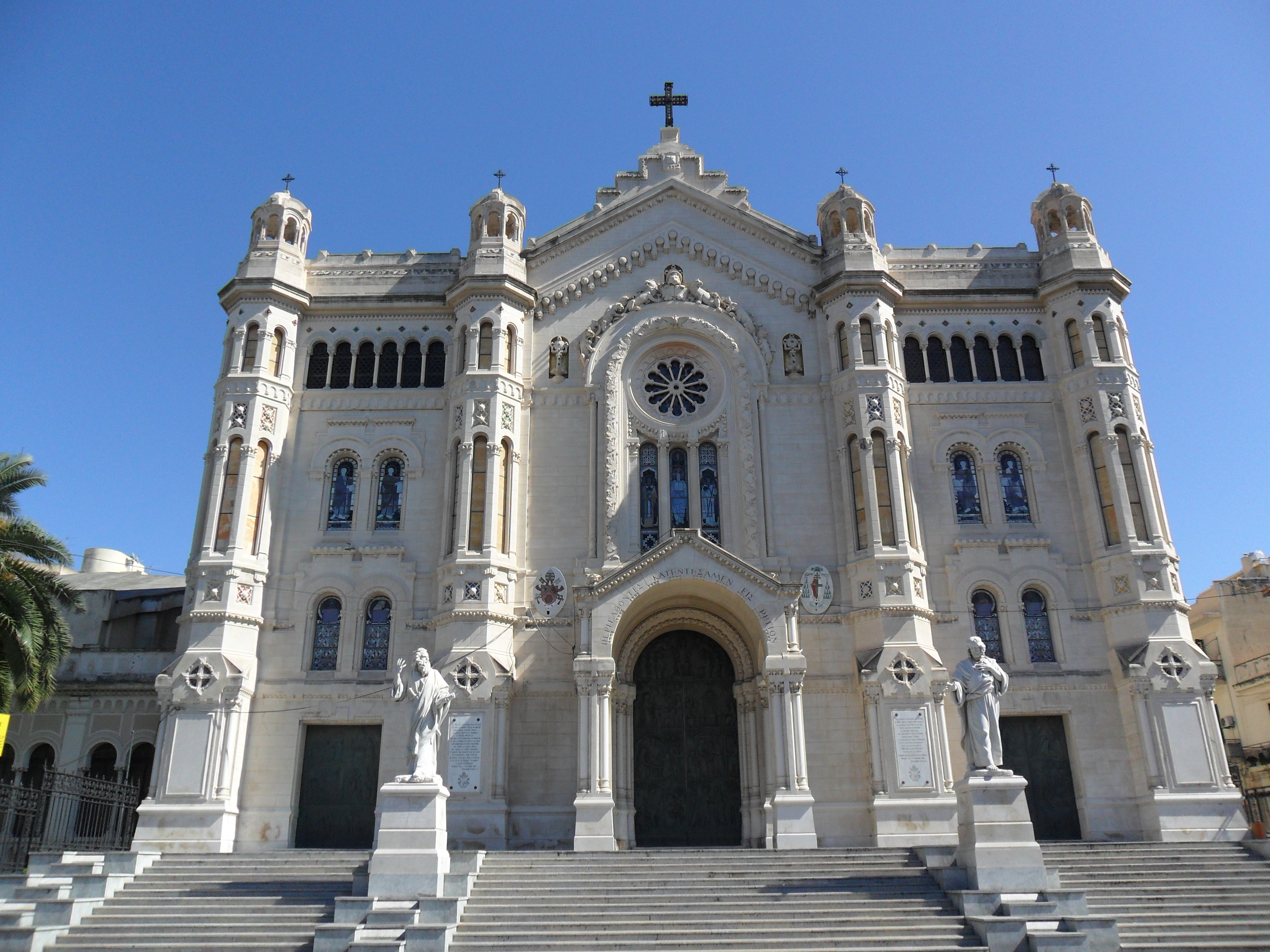
- Reggio Calabria Cathedral

Location
- Country: Italy
- Ecclesiastical province: Reggio Calabria-Bova

Statistics
- Area: 1,004 km^{2} (388 sq mi)
- Population: Total; Catholics: (as of 2023); 277,900 (est.) ▼; 273,900 (est.) ▼
- Parishes: 120

Information
- Denomination: Catholic Church
- Sui iuris church: Latin Church
- Rite: Roman Rite
- Established: 1st century
- Cathedral: Basilica Cattedrale di Maria SS. Assunta in Cielo (Reggio Calabria)
- Co-cathedral: Concattedrale della Presentazione della Beata Vergine Maria (Bova)
- Secular priests: 113 (diocesan) ▼36 (Religious Orders) ▼49 Permanent Deacons

Current leadership
- Pope: Leo XIV
- Archbishop: Fortunato Morrone
- Bishops emeritus: Giuseppe Fiorini Morosini, Vittorio Mondello O.M.

Map

The Archdiocese of Reggio Calabria-Bova (Latin: Archidioecesis Rheginensis-Bovensis) is a Latin Church ecclesiastical territory or diocese of the Catholic Church in Calabria, southern Italy. It received its current title in 1986, when the independent Diocese of Bova was suppressed, and the territory and title of the diocese added to that of the Archdiocese of Reggio.

== History ==
=== Early history ===
Through a fanciful reading of The Book of Acts of the Apostles 27, St. Paul was said to have preached the Gospel at Reggio Calabria, and to have consecrated his companion, St. Stephen, ^{(it)} bishop. The first bishop known is Bishop Marcus of Calabria, who was one of five legates of Pope Sylvester I at the Council of Nicaea (325).

=== Medieval period ===
When all Southern Italy was united to the Patriarchate of Constantinople in 732, Reggio became a metropolitan see with thirteen suffragans, and followed the Greek Rite, which was changed to the Gallican Rite after the Norman Conquest in the eleventh century. Reggio had been conquered by the Normans before 1079 and when Basil, the candidate chosen by the patriarch of Constantinople Cosmas I., attempted to take his position, the Normans prevented him from doing so as they saw him as an agent of a foreign power whose lands they were preparing to invade. The seat remained empty for some time until the synod of Melfi in 1089 where Basil appealed to the gathered bishops. He clashed however with pope Urban II when he rejected Urban's authority over the bishops of Italy and his right to appoint bishops in Italy, which was affirmed by the Greek bishops of Rossano and San Severina. His claim was therefore rejected and Rangerius, a monks from Marmoutier, was elected as bishop.

=== Modern period ===
Archbishop Ricciullo adopted the Roman Rite in 1580. The Greek Rite, however, continued to be used in the church of Santissima Maria della Cattolica, built by King Roger, and governed by a protopope with a numerous Greek clergy. Questions of jurisdiction caused frequent controversies with the archbishop. About 1600 Archbishop Annibale d'Afflitto suppressed the Greek Rite in that church, and the entire diocese now follows the Roman Rite.

In 1594 the city of Reggio suffered a devastating attack of the Turkish fleet, which did severe damage to churches, monasteries and hospitals.

In 1783 an earthquake struck the city and damaged the Cathedral of the Assumption of the Body of the Blessed Virgin Mary into Heaven.

On 28 December 1908 a severe earthquake heavily damaged the Cathedral of Reggio. Reconstruction was immediately put in motion by Archbishop Rinaldo Rousset.

The cathedral is served by a Chapter composed of four dignities and twenty four Canons. The dignities are: the Dean, the Cantor, the Archdeacon, and the Treasurer. Originally there were only twelve Canons, but Archbishop Centelles increased the number to eighteen, and Archbishop Gaspare de Creales brought the number up to twenty-four. Pope Benedict XIV, in a Bull of 25 September 1741, granted the Canons the right to wear a mitre and a cope.

==== Archival Heritage ====
The Diocesan Historical Archive of Reggio Calabria–Bova preserves records dating from 1495 to 2011, comprising approximately 500 metres of shelving and around 6,000 archival units. Earlier collections were lost during the Turkish assault of 1594 and subsequent dispersals, but significant materials were recovered and restored during the twentieth century, notably under Msgr. Rocco Bevacqua and Msgr. Nicola Ferrante. The archive was formally recognized in 1997 as being of "considerable historical interest" by the Italian Ministry of Cultural Heritage.

Digitization projects have made parts of the collection accessible online. Parish registers and diplomatic fonds are published through Monasterium.net and BeWeB (Beni ecclesiastici in web), while digital images of visitations and registers are available on the archive’s own website.

==== Cultural Initiatives ====
The Archdiocesan Museum, Archive, and Library (MAB) organize cultural and educational programs. In 2024, they hosted a training course entitled Paul of Tarsus and the Origins of the Church in Reggio, combining lectures with guided visits to the Cathedral, the Seminary Chapel, the National Archaeological Museum of Reggio Calabria, and local Orthodox and Jewish places of worship. The initiative was designed to prepare guides and students for the Jubilee Year 2025.

==== Devotional Traditions ====
The archdiocese is known for regional pilgrimages and processions, including the annual Procession of the Madonna della Consolazione in Reggio Calabria, during which a large painting of the Virgin is carried from the Sanctuary of the Madonna della Consolazione to the Cathedral. In the Bova area, Greek-speaking communities maintain traditional devotions at the Co-Cathedral of Maria SS. dell'Isodia and the Sanctuary of Saint Leo.

== Bishops ==
=== to 1200 ===
? St. Sisinnius (536)
...

- Lucius
- Bonifatius (attested 592 – 599)
- Joannes (attested 649)

...

- Joannes (attested 680)

...

- Constantinus (attested 790)

...

- Leontius (attested 869)

...

- Eusebius (c. 902 – 916)
- Stephanus (916–?)
- Galatus
- Rogerius (attested 1014)

...

- Basilius, Greek Metropolitan of Calabria (? – c. 1078)
- Arnulphus (c. 1081 – 1090)
- Rangerius, O.S.B. (1090–1112)

...

- Rogerius (1146–1169)

...

- Thomas (attested 1179 – 1189)
- Guillelmus (attested 4 October 1190 – 7 April 1199, died)
- J(acobus) (16 August 1199 – c. 1215)

=== from 1200 to 1600 ===
- Giraldus (attested 24 June 1215 – 21 November 1216)
- Lando (attested July 1218 – 9 February 1236)
- Vernaccio (1252 – after 12 January 1255)
- Jacobus de Castiglione (11 March 1259 – 1277)
- Gentile, O. Min. (9 October 1279 – 6 July 1307)
- Tommaso (7 August 1307 – 1316)

Sede vacante (1316–1321)

- Pietro, O.S.A. (30 April 1321 – 1328 Died)
- Pietro de Galganis (5 October 1328 – 29 January 1354)
- Filippo Maurello de Castiglione (29 January 1354 – c. 1363?)
- Carlo (12 February 1364 – c. 1371?)
- Tommaso della Porta (19 January 1372 – ? )
- Giordano (c. 1382 – 1404?)
- Pietro Filomarini (1404–1420 Died)
- Bartolomeo Gattola (1421–1426) Appointed Archbishop of Messina
- Gaspare Colonna (1426–1429) Appointed Archbishop of Benevento
- Paolo di Segni (1429–1437 Resigned)
- Guglielmo Logoteta (1440–1449 Died)
- Angelo de Grassis (30 April 1449 – 1453 Died)
- Antonio Ricci (4 June 1453 – 1488 Died)

Sede vacante (1488–1491)

- Marco Miroldi, O.P. (4 January 1491 – 1495 Died)
- Pietro Isvales (1497–24 Jul 1506 Resigned)
- Francesco Isvales (1506–1512 Died)
- Roberto Latino Orsini (23 July 1512 – 1520 Resigned)
- Agostino Trivulzio (24 August 1520 – 1 October 1520 Resigned), Administrator
- Pietro Trivulzio (1 October 1520 – 1523 Died)
- Agostino Trivulzio (26 November 1523 – 16 July 1529 Resigned), Administrator
- Girolamo Centelles (16 July 1529 – 1535 Resigned)
- Agostino Gonzaga (11 April 1537 – 1557 Died)
- Gaspare Ricciullo del Fosso, O.M. (1560–1592 Died)
- Annibale D'Afflitto (15 November 1593 – 1 April 1638 Died)

=== from 1600 to 1900 ===
Sede vacante (1638 – 1644)

- Gaspar de Creales Arce (12 December 1644 – 1658 Died)
- Matteo di Génnaro (5 April 1660 – 21 January 1674 Died)
- Martín Ibáñez y Villanueva, O.SS.T. (27 May 1675 – September 1695 Died)
- Giovanni Andrea Monreale (1696–1726 Died)
- Domingo (Damiano) Polou (1727–1756 Died)
- Domenico Zicari (1757–1760 Died)
- Matteo Gennaro Testa Piccolomini (1761–1766 Resigned)
- Alberto Maria (Leonardo Antonio Pasquale) Capobianco, O.P. (1767–1792 Resigned)
- Giuseppe Maria Cenicela, O.F.M. Disc. (1797–1814 Died)

Sede vacante (1814–1818)

- Alessandro Tommasini (1818–1826 Died)
- Emanuele Maria Bellorado, O.P. (28 January 1828 – 18 May 1829)
- Leone Ciampa, O.F.M. Disc. (18 May 1829 – 1 February 1836)
- Pietro di Benedetto (1836–1855 Died)
- Mariano Ricciardi (1855–1871)
- Francesco Saverio Basile (1871–1871 Died)
- Francesco Converti, O.F.M. (1872–1888 Resigned)
- Gennaro Portanova (1888–1908 Died)

=== since 1900 ===
- Rinaldo Camillo Rousset, O.C.D. (1909–1926 Died)
- Carmelo Pujia (1927–1937 Died)
- Enrico Montalbetti, Obs. S.C. (1938–1943 Died)
- Antonio Lanza (1943–1950 Died)
- Giovanni Ferro, C.R.S. (1950–1977 Retired)
- Aureliano Sorrentino (1977–1990 Retired)
- Vittorio Luigi Mondello (1990–2013 Retired)
- Giuseppe Fiorini Morosini, O.M. (2013–2021 Retired)
- Fortunato Morrone (2021–present)

== Bibliography ==
=== Reference works ===
- Gams, Pius Bonifatius (1873). Series episcoporum Ecclesiae catholicae: quotquot innotuerunt a beato Petro apostolo. Ratisbon: Typis et Sumptibus Georgii Josephi Manz. p. 926-917. (Use with caution; obsolete)
- Eubel, Conradus, ed. (1913). Hierarchia catholica, Tomus 1 (second ed.). Münster: Libreria Regensbergiana. p. 418. (in Latin)
- Eubel, Conradus, ed. (1914). Hierarchia catholica, Tomus 2 (second ed.). Münster: Libreria Regensbergiana. p. 222.
- Eubel, Conradus; Gulik, Guilelmus (1923). Hierarchia catholica, Tomus 3 (second ed.). Münster: Libreria Regensbergiana. pp. 284.
- Gauchat, Patritius (Patrice) (1935). Hierarchia catholica IV (1592-1667). Münster: Libraria Regensbergiana. p. 294.
- Loud, G. A. (20 December 2007). The Latin Church in Norman Italy. Cambridge University Press. ISBN 978-1-107-32000-0.
- Ritzler, Remigius; Sefrin, Pirminus (1952). Hierarchia catholica medii et recentis aevi V (1667-1730). Patavii: Messagero di S. Antonio. p. 332.
- Ritzler, Remigius; Sefrin, Pirminus (1958). Hierarchia catholica medii et recentis aevi VI (1730-1799). Patavii: Messagero di S. Antonio. p. 356.
- Ritzler, Remigius; Sefrin, Pirminus (1968). Hierarchia Catholica medii et recentioris aevi sive summorum pontificum, S. R. E. cardinalium, ecclesiarum antistitum series... A pontificatu Pii PP. VII (1800) usque ad pontificatum Gregorii PP. XVI (1846) (in Latin). Vol. VII. Monasterii: Libr. Regensburgiana.
- Ritzler, Remigius; Pirminus Sefrin (1978). Hierarchia catholica Medii et recentioris aevi... A Pontificatu PII PP. IX (1846) usque ad Pontificatum Leonis PP. XIII (1903) (in Latin). Vol. VIII. Il Messaggero di S. Antonio.
- Pięta, Zenon (2002). Hierarchia catholica medii et recentioris aevi... A pontificatu Pii PP. X (1903) usque ad pontificatum Benedictii PP. XV (1922) (in Latin). Vol. IX. Padua: Messagero di San Antonio. ISBN 978-88-250-1000-8.

=== Studies ===
- Avino, Vincenzio d' (1848). Cenni storici sulle chiese arcivescovili, vescovili, e prelatizie (nullius) del regno delle due Sicilie (in Italian). Naples: dalle stampe di Ranucci. pp. 511–515.
- Bolani, Domenico Spanò (1857). Storia di Reggio di Calabria ... sino all'anno ... 1797 (in Italian). Vol. II. Napoli: Fibreno. pp. 233–253.
- Guarno-Logoteta, Carlo (1899), "Cronaca dei vescovi ed arcivescovi di Reggio," (in Italian), in: Rivista storica calabrese Anno VII (1899), pp. 65, 129, 169, 233, 297, 377, 417, 457, 497, 561, 625.
- Kamp, Norbert (1975). Kirche und Monarchie im staufischen Königreich Sizilien: I. Prosopographische Grundlegung, Bistumer und Bistümer und Bischöfe des Konigreichs 1194–1266: 2. Apulien und Calabrien München: Wilhelm Fink 1975.
- Kehr, Paulus Fridolin (1975). Italia pontificia. Regesta pontificum Romanorum. Vol. X: Calabria–Insulae. Berlin: Weidmann. (in Latin)
- Lanzoni, Francesco (1927). Le diocesi d'Italia dalle origini al principio del secolo VII (an. 604) (in Italian). Rome: Biblioteca Apostolica Vaticana.
- Russo, Francesco (1962). Storia dell'archidiocesi di Reggio Calabria, 3 vols (Naples: Laurenziana, 1961, 1962, 1963).
- Russo, Francesco (1982). Storia della Chiesa in Calabria dalle origini al Concilio di Trento, 2 vols. Rubbetino: Soveria Mannelli 1982.
- Taccone-Gallucci, Domenico (1902). Regesti dei Romani pontefici della Calabria (in Italian). Rome: Tip. Vaticana. pp. 399–402.
- Ughelli, Ferdinando; Coleti, Niccolo (1721). Italia Sacra Sive De Episcopis Italiae, Et Insularum adiacentium (in Latin). Vol. Tomus nonus (9). Venice: Antonio Coleti. pp. 315–338.
