= Reggio Calabria Cathedral =

Roman Catholic cathedral in Reggio Calabria, Calabria, Italy

Coordinates: 38°6′20.51″N 15°38′30.21″E

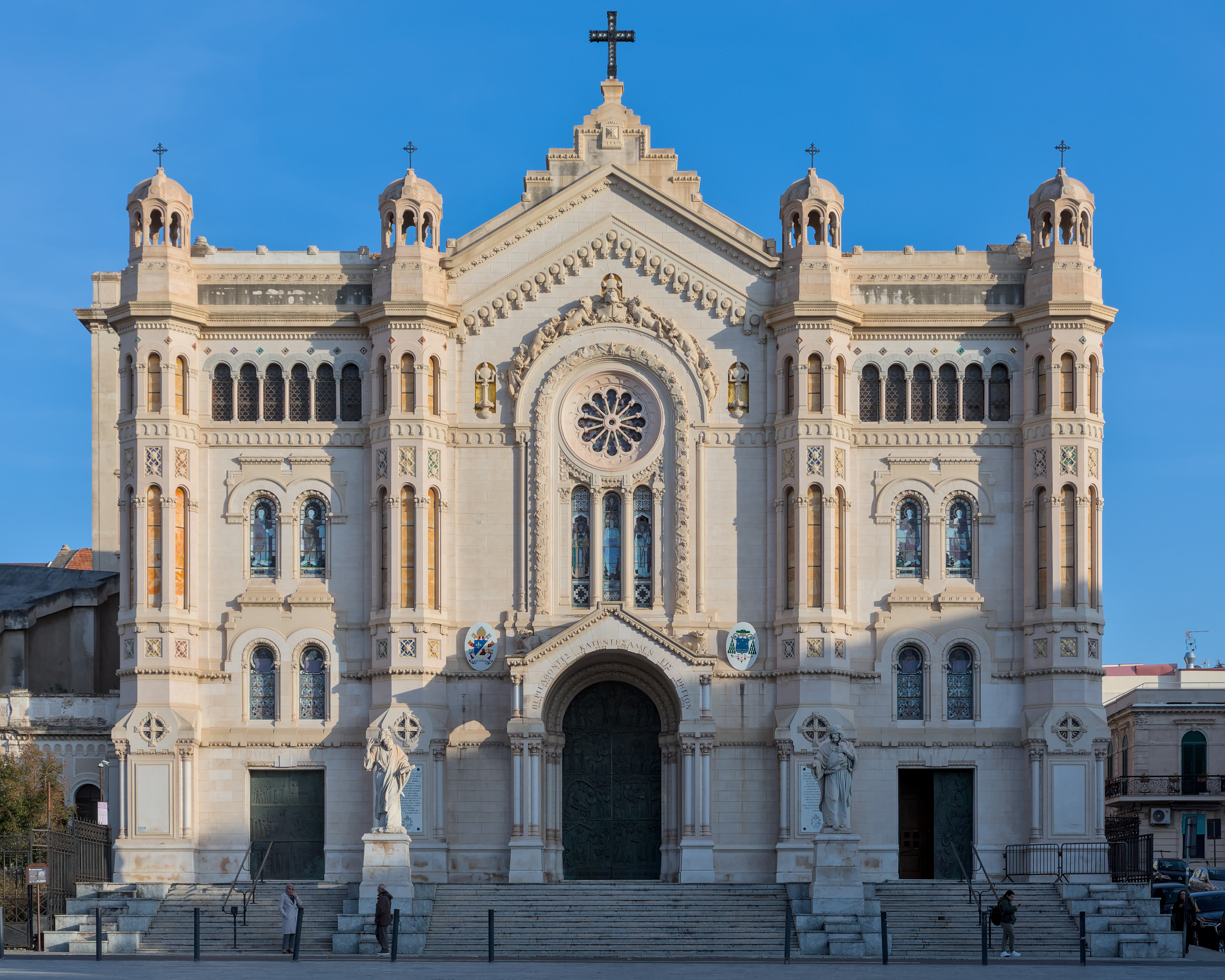
West front of the cathedral

Reggio Calabria Cathedral (Italian: Duomo di Reggio Calabria; Basilica Cattedrale Metropolitana di Maria Santissima Assunta in Cielo) is a Roman Catholic cathedral in Reggio Calabria, Calabria, Italy. The dedication is to the Assumption of the Virgin Mary. Formerly the archiepiscopal seat of the Archdiocese of Reggio Calabria, it is now that of the Archdiocese of Reggio Calabria-Bova.

The cathedral was severely damaged by an earthquake in 1908, and rebuilt in a modern eclectic style with Romanesque and Gothic elements. The initial design was by the engineer P. Carmelo Umberto Angiolini and then modified by the engineer Mariano Francesconi. The new church was consecrated in 1928.

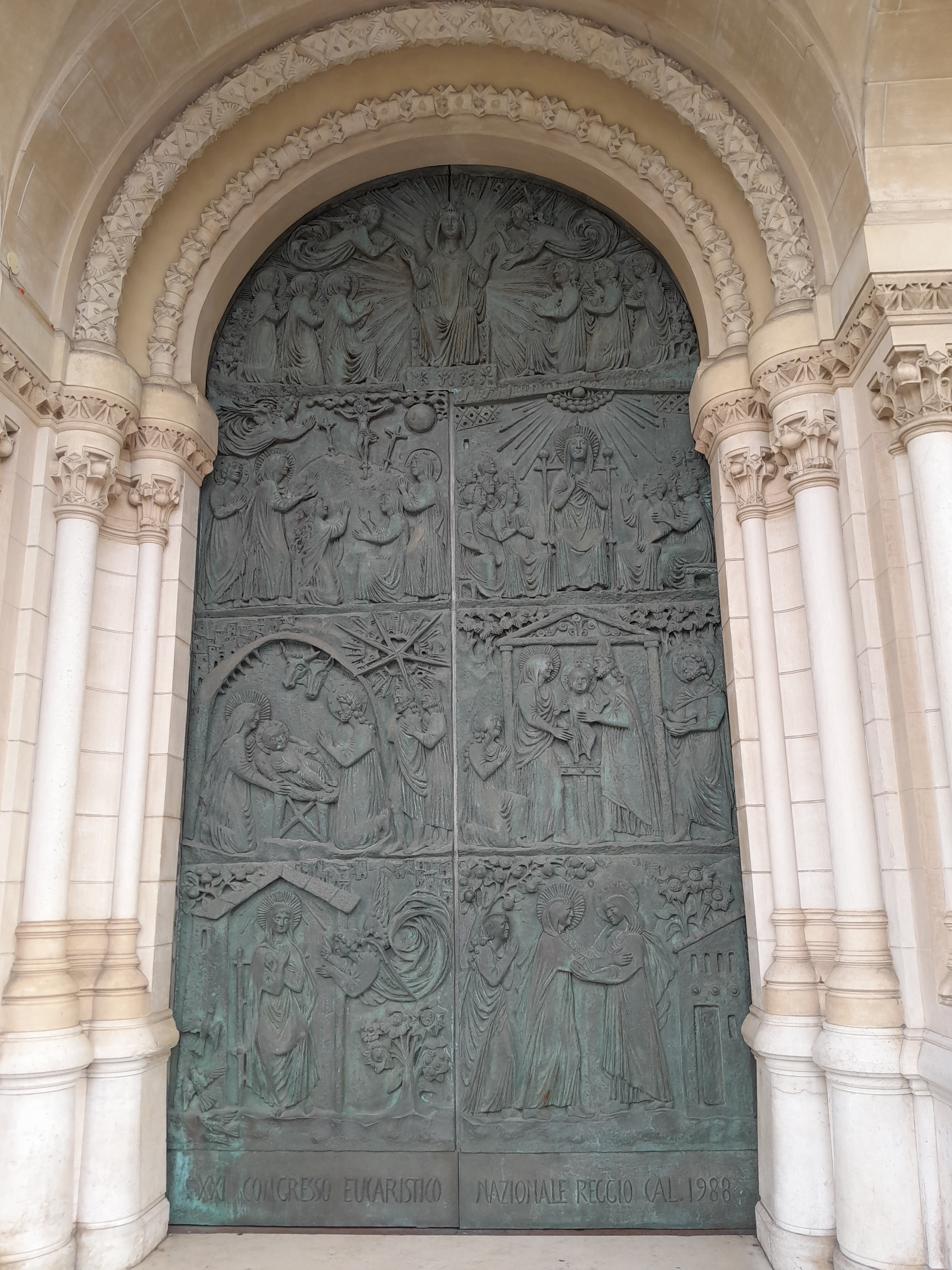
Doors

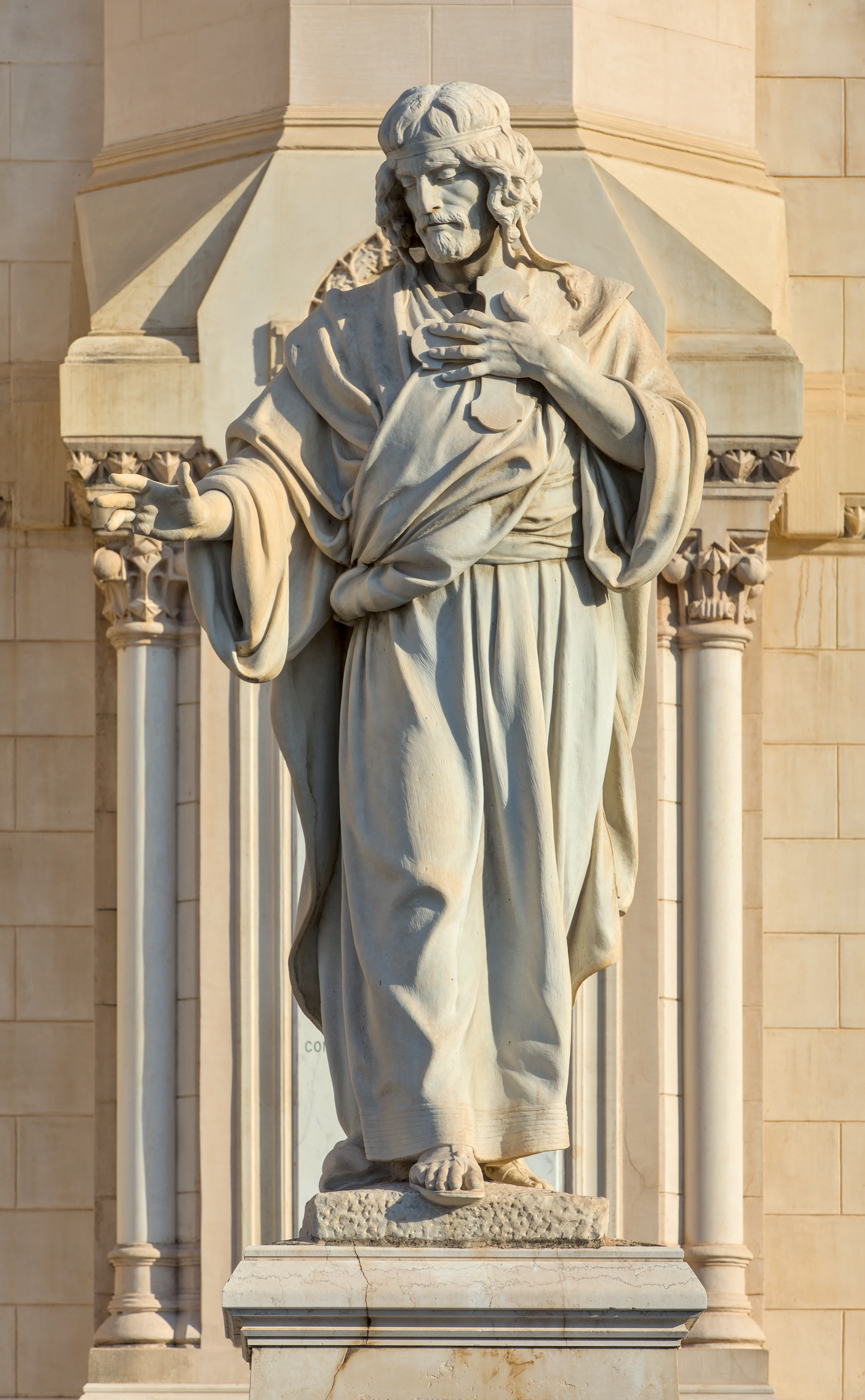
Statue of St Stephen of Nicaea

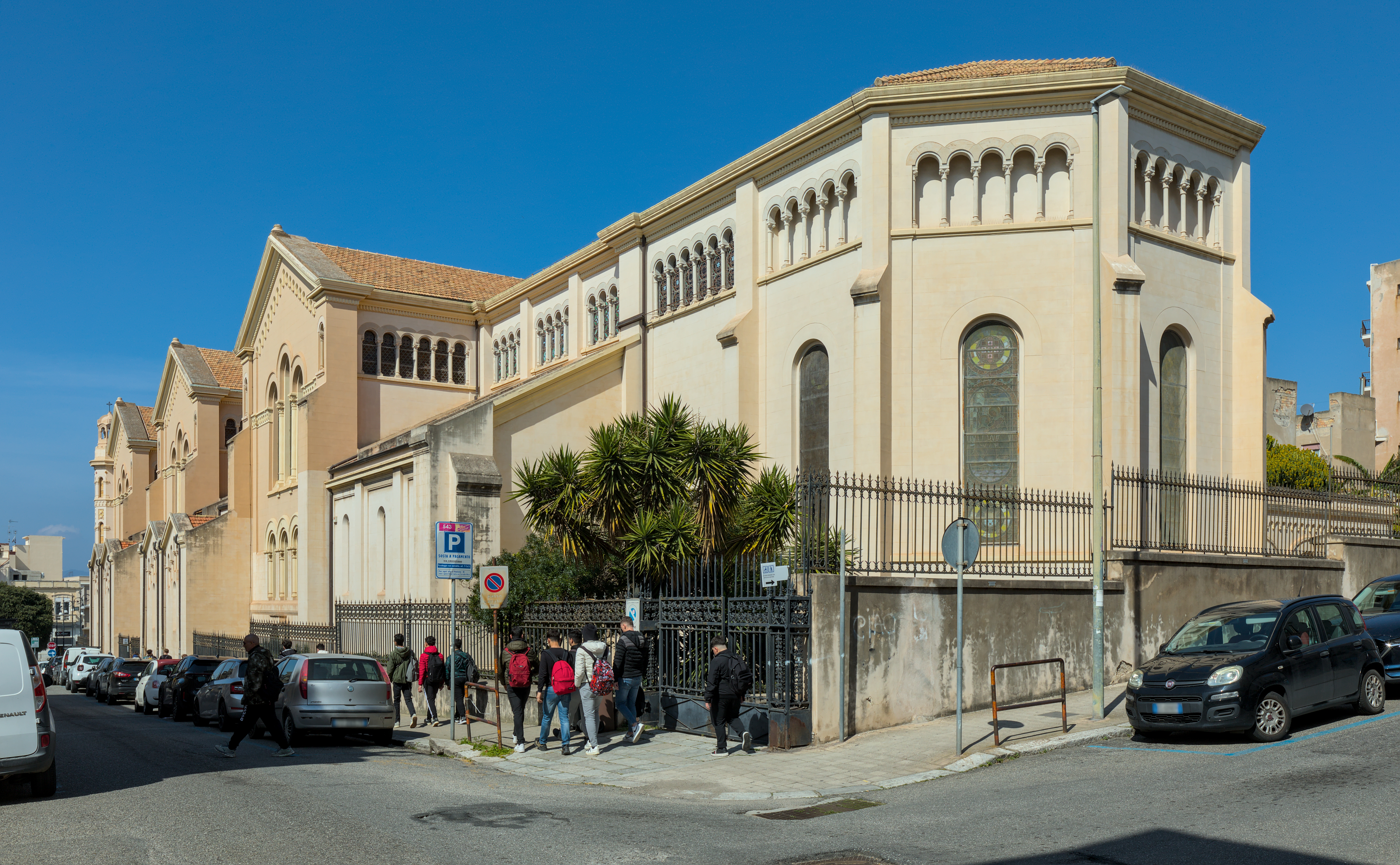
Apse

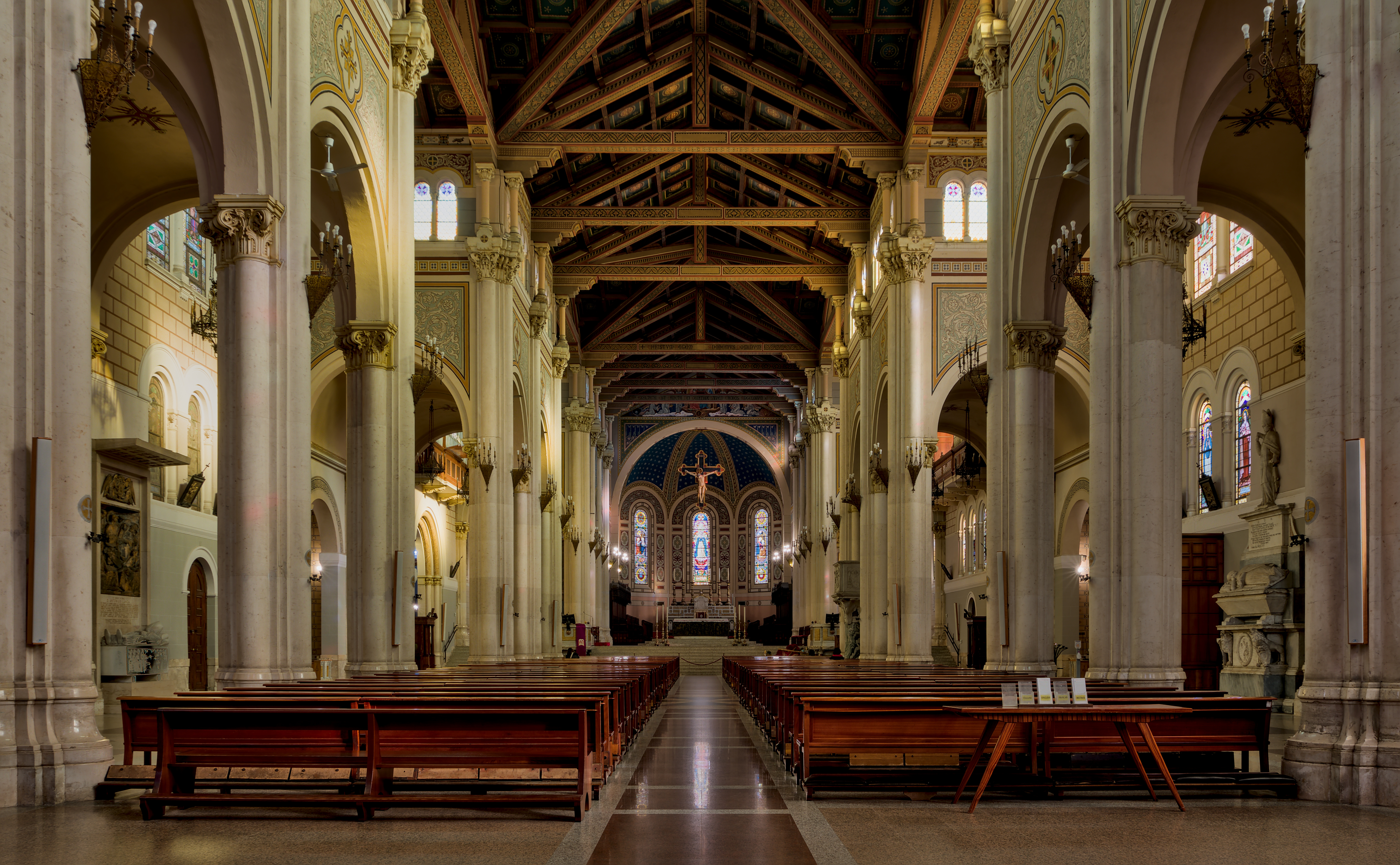
Nave

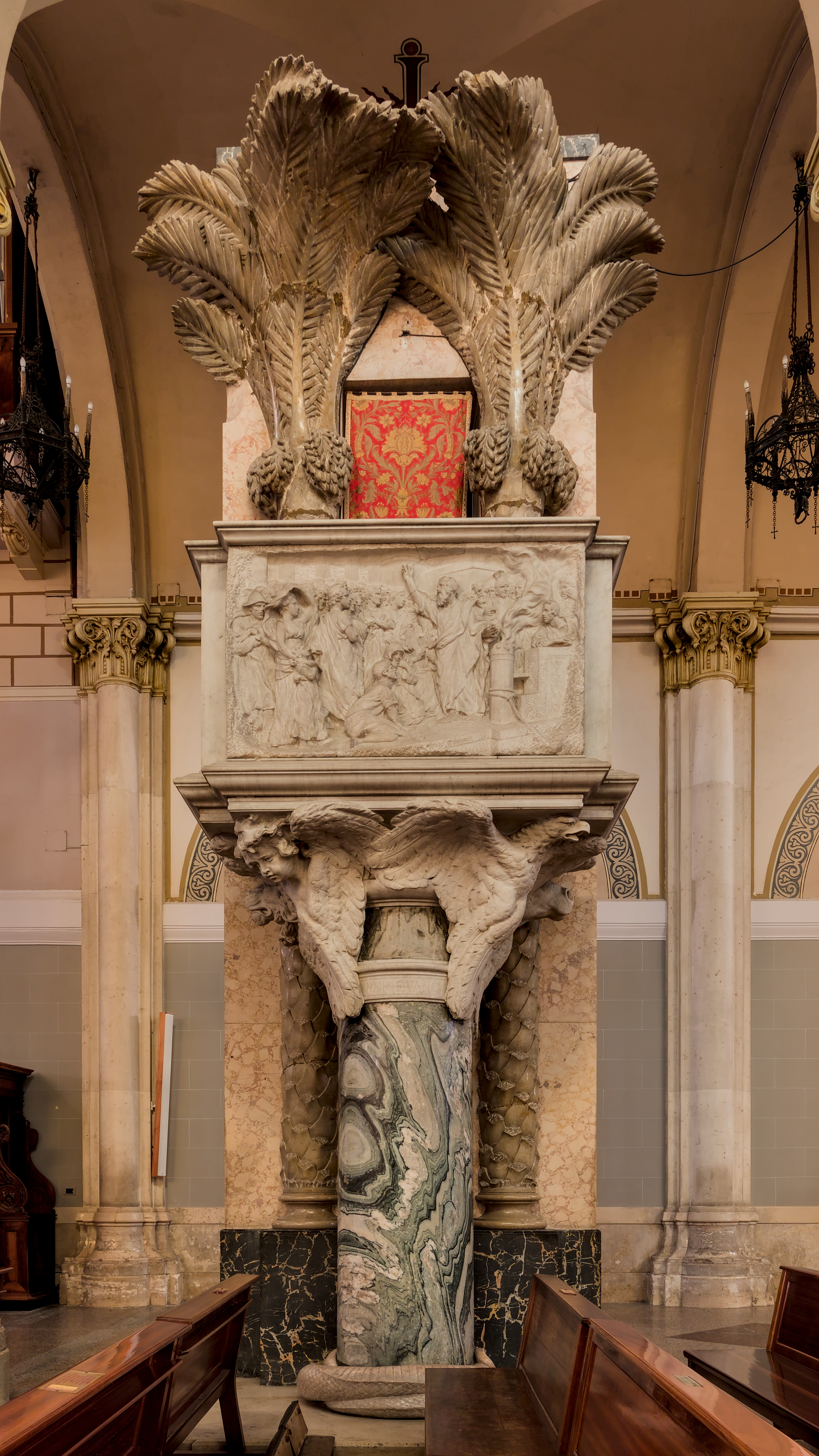
Pulpit
