= Calvi =

Calvi may refer to:

== Places and jurisdictions ==
=== France ===
- Arrondissement of Calvi, Haute-Corse department, Corsica
- Calvi, Haute-Corse, a city and commune of the Haute-Corse département on the island of Corsica

=== Italy ===
- Calvi, Campania, a comune in the Province of Benevento
- Calvi dell'Umbria, a comune in the Province of Terni
- Calvi Risorta, a comune in the Province of Caserta, Campania
  - Roman Catholic Diocese of Calvi, with see in the above Campanian town

== Other uses ==
- Calvi (surname)
- Calvi class submarine, a type of Italian submarine used during the Second World War
- Calvi (Attack on Titan), a character in the manga series Attack on Titan
