= Lorenzo Spada =

Roman Catholic prelate

Most Reverend Lorenzo Spada
- Bishop of Calvi Risorta
- Church: Catholic Church
- Diocese: Diocese of Calvi Risorta
- In office: 1543–1544
- Predecessor: Giovanni Antonio Gallo
- Successor: Berenguer Gombau

Personal details
- Died: 1544 Calvi Risorta, Italy

Lorenzo Spada (died 1544) was a Roman Catholic prelate who served as Bishop of Calvi Risorta (1543–1544).

== Biography ==
Lorenzo Spada was ordained a priest in the Order of Friars Minor Conventual. On 1 June 1543, he was appointed by Pope Paul III as Bishop of Calvi Risorta. He served as Bishop of Calvi Risorta until his death in 1544.

== External links and additional sources ==
- Cheney, David M. "Diocese of Calvi". Catholic-Hierarchy.org. (for Chronology of Bishops) ^{[self-published]}
- Chow, Gabriel. "Diocese of Calvi (Italy)". GCatholic.org. (for Chronology of Bishops) ^{[self-published]}

Catholic Church titles
Preceded by Giovanni Antonio Gallo	Bishop of Calvi Risorta; 1543–1544	Succeeded by Berenguer Gombau
