= Vincenzo Carafa (bishop) =

Italian Roman Catholic prelate

Most Reverend Vincenzo Carafa
- Bishop of Calvi Risorta
- Church: Catholic Church
- Diocese: Diocese of Calvi Risorta
- In office: 1661–1679
- Predecessor: Francesco Maria Falcucci
- Successor: Vincenzo Maria da Silva

Personal details
- Died: 1679 Calvi Risorta, Italy

Vincenzo Carafa (died 1679) was a Roman Catholic prelate who served as Bishop of Calvi Risorta (1661–1679).

== Biography ==
On 8 August 1661, Vincenzo Carafa was appointed by Pope Alexander VII as Bishop of Calvi Risorta. He served as Bishop of Calvi Risorta until his death in 1679.

== See also ==
- Catholic Church in Italy

== External links and additional sources ==
Catholic Church titles
Preceded by Francesco Maria Falcucci	Bishop of Calvi Risorta; 1661–1679	Succeeded by Vincenzo Maria da Silva
