= Matteo Orsini (disambiguation) =

Matteo Orsini may refer to:

- Matteo Rosso Orsini (1178–1246), Roman senator
- Matteo Rosso Orsini (cardinal) (1262–1305)
- Matteo Orsini (died 1340), Dominican friar and cardinal
- Matteo Orsini (bishop) (died 1512)
