= Ascanio Marchesini =

Most Reverend Ascanio Marchesini
- Bishop of Calvi Risorta
- Church: Catholic Church
- Diocese: Diocese of Calvi Risorta
- In office: 1575–1580
- Predecessor: Paolo Terracino
- Successor: Scipione Bozzuti
- Previous post: Titular Bishop of Maioren (1567–1575)

Orders
- Consecration: 19 May 1567 by Egidio Valenti

Personal details
- Died: 1580 Calvi Risorta, Italy

Ascanio Marchesini (died 1580) was a Roman Catholic prelate who served as Bishop of Calvi Risorta (1575–1580) and Titular Bishop of Maioren (1567–1575).

== Biography ==
On 18 April 1567, Ascanio Marchesini was appointed during the papacy of Pope Pius V as Titular Bishop of Maioren. On 19 May 1567, he was consecrated bishop by Egidio Valenti, Bishop of Nepi e Sutri, with Thomas Goldwell, Bishop of Saint Asaph, and Giambattista Milanese, Bishop of Marsi, serving as co-consecrators. On 23 September 1575, he was appointed during the papacy of Pope Gregory XIII as Bishop of Calvi Risorta. He served as Bishop of Calvi Risorta until his death in 1580.

== External links and additional sources ==
- Cheney, David M. "Maioren (Titular See)". Catholic-Hierarchy.org. (for Chronology of Bishops) ^{[self-published]}
- Cheney, David M. "Diocese of Calvi". Catholic-Hierarchy.org. (for Chronology of Bishops) ^{[self-published]}
- Chow, Gabriel. "Diocese of Calvi (Italy)". GCatholic.org. (for Chronology of Bishops) ^{[self-published]}

Catholic Church titles
Preceded by Johann Thomas von Spaur	Titular Bishop of Maioren; 1567–1575	Succeeded by
Preceded by Paolo Terracino	Bishop of Calvi Risorta; 1575–1580	Succeeded by Scipione Bozzuti
