= Paolo Terracino =

Italian Roman Catholic prelate

Most Reverend Paolo Terracino
- Bishop of Calvi Risorta
- Church: Catholic Church
- Diocese: Diocese of Calvi Risorta
- In office: 1566–1575
- Predecessor: Giulio Magnani
- Successor: Ascanio Marchesini

Personal details
- Died: 1575 Calvi Risorta, Italy

Paolo Terracino (died 1575) was a Roman Catholic prelate who served as Bishop of Calvi Risorta (1566–1575).

== Biography ==
On 10 June 1566, Paolo Terracino was appointed by Pope Pius V as Bishop of Calvi Risorta. He served as Bishop of Calvi Risorta until his death in 1575.

== External links and additional sources ==
- Cheney, David M. "Diocese of Calvi". Catholic-Hierarchy.org. (for Chronology of Bishops) ^{[self-published]}
- Chow, Gabriel. "Diocese of Calvi (Italy)". GCatholic.org. (for Chronology of Bishops) ^{[self-published]}

Catholic Church titles
Preceded by Giulio Magnani	Bishop of Calvi Risorta; 1566–1575	Succeeded by Ascanio Marchesini
