= Maurilio Giannotti =

Roman Catholic prelate

Most Reverend Maurilio Giannotti
- Bishop of Calvi Risorta
- Church: Catholic Church
- Diocese: Diocese of Calvi Risorta
- In office: 1495–1505
- Successor: Matteo Orsini (bishop)

Personal details
- Died: 1505 Calvi Risorta, Italy

Maurilio Giannotti (died 1505) was a Roman Catholic prelate who served as Bishop of Calvi Risorta (1495–1505).

In 1495, Maurilio Giannotti was appointed by Pope Alexander VI as Bishop of Calvi Risorta. He served as Bishop of Calvi Risorta until his death in 1505.

== External links and additional sources ==
- Cheney, David M. "Diocese of Calvi". Catholic-Hierarchy.org. (for Chronology of Bishops) ^{[self-published]}
- Chow, Gabriel. "Diocese of Calvi (Italy)". GCatholic.org. (for Chronology of Bishops) ^{[self-published]}

Catholic Church titles
| Preceded by | Bishop of Calvi Risorta; 1495–1505 | Succeeded by Matteo Orsini (bishop) |
