= Gennaro Filomarino =

Most Reverend Gennaro Filomarino
- Bishop of Calvi Risorta
- Church: Catholic Church
- Diocese: Diocese of Calvi Risorta
- In office: 1623–1650
- Predecessor: Gregorio Del Bufalo
- Successor: Francesco Maria Falcucci

Orders
- Consecration: 24 December 1623 by Cosimo de Torres

Personal details
- Born: 1591
- Died: October 1650 (aged 58–59) Calvi Risorta, Italy

Gennaro Filomarino, C.R. (1591–1650) was a Roman Catholic prelate who served as Bishop of Calvi Risorta (1623–1650).

== Biography ==
Gennaro Filomarino was born in 1591 and ordained a priest in the Congregation of Clerics Regular of the Divine Providence. On 18 December 1623, he was appointed during the papacy of Pope Urban VIII as Bishop of Calvi Risorta. On 24 December 1623, he was consecrated bishop by Cosimo de Torres, Cardinal-Priest of San Pancrazio, with Alessandro di Sangro, Archbishop of Benevento, and Giuseppe Acquaviva, Titular Archbishop of Thebae, serving as co-consecrators. He served as Bishop of Calvi Risorta until his death in October 1650.

== Episcopal succession ==
While bishop, he was the principal co-consecrator of:

- Ascanio Filomarino, Archbishop of Naples (1642); and
- Vincenzo Maculani, Archbishop of Benevento (1642).

== External links and additional sources ==
- Cheney, David M. "Diocese of Calvi". Catholic-Hierarchy.org. (for Chronology of Bishops) ^{[self-published]}
- Chow, Gabriel. "Diocese of Calvi (Italy)". GCatholic.org. (for Chronology of Bishops) ^{[self-published]}

Catholic Church titles
Preceded by Gregorio Del Bufalo	Bishop of Calvi Risorta; 1623–1650	Succeeded by Francesco Maria Falcucci
