= Calvi (surname) =

Calvi is an Italian surname. Notable people with the surname include:

- Michelangelo Calvi, American artist
- Alessandro Calvi (born 1983), Italian swimmer
- Anna Calvi (born 1980), English musician
- Gaetanina Calvi (1887–1964), Italian engineer
- Gérard Calvi (1922–2015), French composer
- Giorgio Calvi di Bergolo (1887–1977), Italian general
- Guido Calvi (1893–1958), Italian middle-distance runner
- Jacopo Alessandro Calvi (1740–1815), Italian painter
- Laura M. Calvi, American neuroendocrinologist and physician-scientist
- Lazzaro Calvi (1512–1587), Italian painter
- Mark Calvi (born 1969), American college baseball coach
- Mary Calvi (born 1969), American journalist
- Paolo Battista Giudice Calvi (1490–1561), 62nd Doge of the Republic of Genoa
- Pino Calvi (1930–1989), Italian pianist and composer
- Rinaldo di Calvi, Italian Renaissance painter
- Roberto Calvi (1920–1982), Italian banker
- Yves Calvi (born 1959), French journalist

== Other ==
- Canton of Calvi, administrative division of the Haute-Corse department, France
