= Fabio Maranta =

Roman Catholic bishop (d. 1619)

Most Reverend Fabio Maranta
- Bishop of Calvi Risorta
- Church: Catholic Church
- Diocese: Diocese of Calvi Risorta
- In office: 1582–1619
- Predecessor: Scipione Bozzuti
- Successor: Gregorio Del Bufalo

Personal details
- Died: 1619 Calvi Risorta, Italy

Fabio Maranta (died 1619) was a Roman Catholic prelate who was Bishop of Calvi Risorta (1582–1619).

On 5 March 1582, Fabio Maranta was appointed Bishop by Pope Gregory XIII as Bishop of Calvi Risorta. He served as Bishop of Calvi Risorta until his death in 1619.

== External links and additional sources ==
- Cheney, David M. "Diocese of Calvi". Catholic-Hierarchy.org. (for Chronology of Bishops) ^{[self-published]}
- Chow, Gabriel. "Diocese of Calvi (Italy)". GCatholic.org. (for Chronology of Bishops) ^{[self-published]}

Catholic Church titles
Preceded by Scipione Bozzuti	Bishop of Calvi Risorta; 1582–1619	Succeeded by Gregorio Del Bufalo
