= Giuseppe Acquaviva =

17th-century Roman Catholic prelate and archbishop

Most Reverend Giuseppe Acquaviva
- Titular Archbishop of Thebae
- Church: Catholic Church
- In office: 1621–1634
- Successor: Lelio Falconieri

Orders
- Consecration: 5 September 1621 by Ludovico Ludovisi

Personal details
- Died: 1634

Giuseppe Acquaviva (died 1634) was a Roman Catholic prelate who served as Titular Archbishop of Thebae (1621–1634).

== Biography ==
On 9 August 1621, Giuseppe Acquaviva was appointed during the papacy of Pope Gregory XV as Titular Archbishop of Thebae. On 5 September 1621, he was consecrated bishop by Ludovico Ludovisi, Archbishop of Bologna, with Galeazzo Sanvitale, Archbishop Emeritus of Bari, and Ulpiano Volpi, Bishop of Novara serving as co-consecrators. He served as Titular Archbishop of Thebae until his death in 1634.

== Episcopal succession ==
Episcopal succession of Giuseppe Acquaviva

While bishop, he was the principal co-consecrator of:

- Girolamo Costanzo, Bishop of Trivento (1623);
- Tommaso Carafa, Bishop of Vulturara e Montecorvino (1623);
- Gennaro Filomarino, Bishop of Calvi Risorta (1623);
- Felice Siliceo, Bishop of Troia (1623);
- Antimo degli Atti, Bishop of Ortona a Mare e Campli (1624);
- Pietro Massarecchius, Archbishop of Bar (1624);
- Paolo Torelli, Archbishop of Rossano (1624);
- Carlo Emmanuele Pio di Savoia, Bishop of Albano (1627);
- Angelo Cesi, Bishop of Rimini (1627);
- Francesco Maria Brancaccio, Bishop of Capaccio (1627);
- Annibale Mascambruno, Bishop of Castellammare di Stabia (1627);
- Luis Jiménez, Bishop of Ugento (1627);
- Giacomo Marenco, Bishop of Saluzzo (1627); and
- Marius Antonini, Titular Bishop of Neocaesarea in Bithynia and Auxiliary Bishop of Albano (1627).

== See also ==
- Catholic Church in Italy

== External links and additional sources ==
- Cheney, David M. "Thebae (Titular See)". Catholic-Hierarchy.org. (for Chronology of Bishops)^{self-published}
- Chow, Gabriel. "Titular Metropolitan See of Thebæ (Greece)". GCatholic.org. (for Chronology of Bishops)^{self-published}

Catholic Church titles
| Preceded by | Titular Archbishop of Thebae; 1621–1634 | Succeeded by Lelio Falconieri |
