= Gombau =

Gombau is a surname. Notable people with the surname include:

- Berenguer Gombau (died 1551), Italian Roman Catholic prelate
- Josep Gombau (born 1976), Spanish association football coach
