= Santa Brigida, Calvi dell'Umbria =

Church in Calvi dell'Umbria, Italy

Coordinates: 42.401682°N 12.567402°E

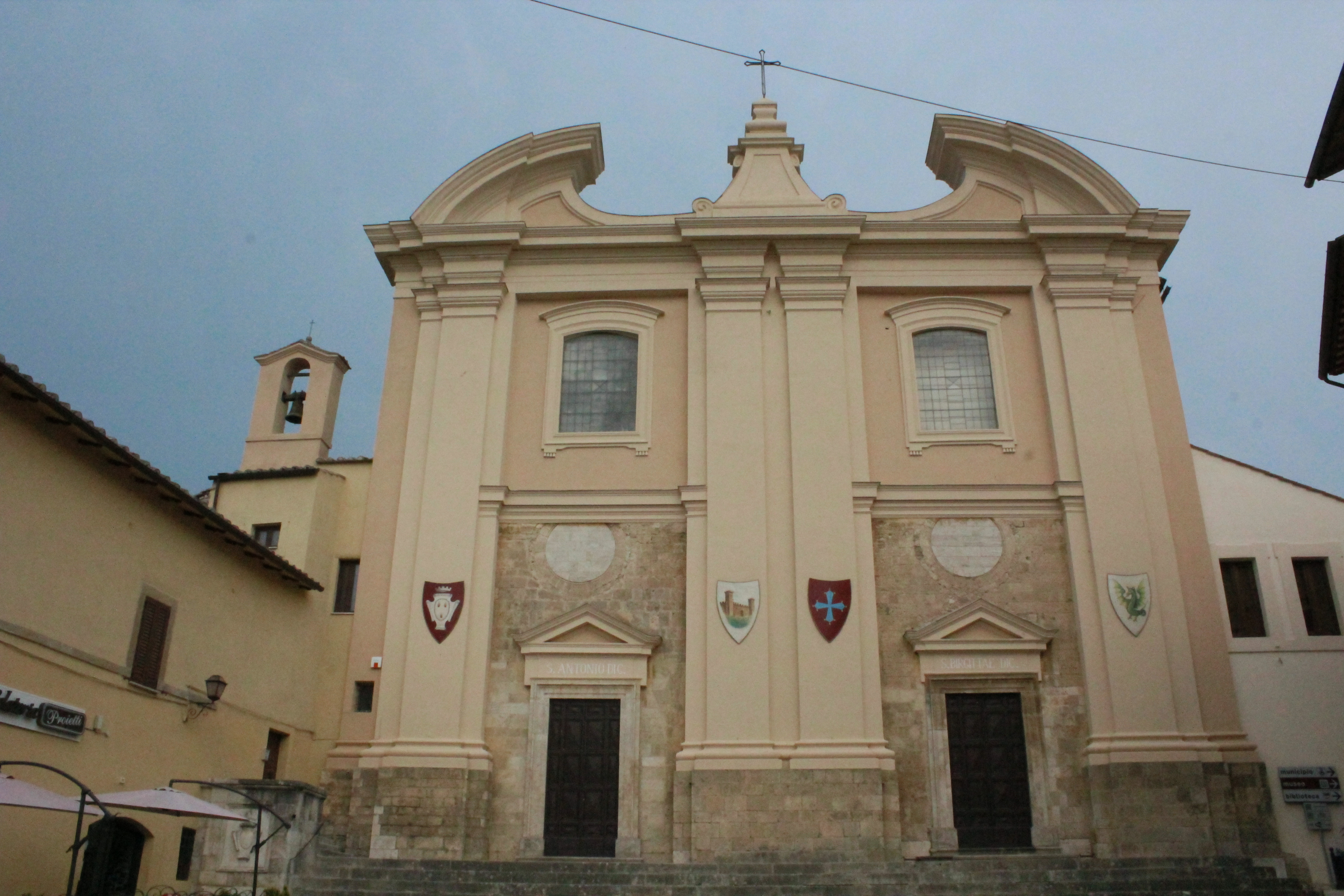
Facade of the church

Santa Brigida refers to the Roman Catholic church and former Ursuline convent located on Piazza Mazzini in the town of Calvi dell'Umbria, province of Terni, region of Umbria, Italy. The convent now functions as the Museo del Monastero delle Suore Orsoline displaying religious works and exhibits about the former life of the Ursuline nuns in the convent.

The baroque-style church standing alongside was built during 1739-1743 using a design by the then papal architect Ferdinando Fuga. The project aimed to enlarge the church of the convent. The site previously contained a medieval church of San Paolo and an Oratory of San Antonio. The two former structures, still evident in the stone around the portals and housing walled up oculi, were hidden behind the tall bipartite facade with giant order pilasters and an unusual tympanum. The tympanum recalls the church of the Babino Gesu all'Esquilino in Rome (now belonging to The Oblate Sisters of the Holy Child Jesus). The Roman church was completed in 1713 with a contribution also by Fuga.

The interior has three altars and in the apse, there are wooden choir stalls. The second story has a number of Wooden screens behind which could sit the cloistered nuns. The church contains altarpieces depicting the Virgin and Child between Saints Brigida and Ursula by Francesco Appiani and a canvas depicting Pentecost circa 1520) by Jacovetti da Calvi. The latter painting was moved here from the church of San Francesco.

The nuns inhabited the monastery until 1994. Some of the original furniture, the kitchens and other portions of the monastery are now open to guided visits.
