= Matteo Orsini (bishop) =

Roman Catholic prelate

Most Reverend Matteo Orsini
- Bishop of Calvi Risorta
- Church: Catholic Church
- Diocese: Diocese of Calvi Risorta
- In office: 1505–1512
- Predecessor: Maurilio Giannotti
- Successor: Giovanni Antonio Gallo

Personal details
- Died: 1512 Calvi Risorta, Italy

Matteo Orsini or Matteo Mignano de Orsini (died 1512) was a Roman Catholic prelate who served as Bishop of Calvi Risorta (1505–1512) and Bishop of Città Ducale (1502–1505).

== Biography ==
On 24 January 1502, Matteo Orsini was appointed during the papacy of Pope Alexander VI as Bishop of Città Ducale. On 8 November 1505, he was appointed during the papacy of Pope Julius II as Bishop of Calvi Risorta. He served as Bishop of Calvi Risorta until his death in 1512.

== External links and additional sources ==
- Cheney, David M. "Diocese of Città Ducale". Catholic-Hierarchy.org. (for Chronology of Bishops) ^{[self-published]}
- Chow, Gabriel. "Titular Episcopal See of Città Ducale (Italy)". GCatholic.org. (for Chronology of Bishops) ^{[self-published]}
- Cheney, David M. "Diocese of Calvi". Catholic-Hierarchy.org. (for Chronology of Bishops) ^{[self-published]}
- Chow, Gabriel. "Diocese of Calvi (Italy)". GCatholic.org. (for Chronology of Bishops) ^{[self-published]}

Catholic Church titles
Preceded by	Bishop of Città Ducale; 1502–1505	Succeeded by Giacomo Alfaridio
Preceded by Maurilio Giannotti	Bishop of Calvi Risorta; 1505–1512	Succeeded by Giovanni Antonio Gallo
