= Giacomo Alfaridio =

Most Reverend Giacomo Alfaridio
- Bishop of Città Ducale
- Church: Catholic Church
- Diocese: Diocese of Città Ducale
- In office: 1508–1511
- Predecessor: Matteo Mignano de Orsini
- Successor: Giacomo de Massimi

Personal details
- Died: 1511 Città Ducale, Italy

Giacomo Alfaridio (died 1511) was a Roman Catholic prelate who served as Bishop of Città Ducale (1508–1511).

== Biography ==
On 16 October 1508, Giacomo Alfaridio was appointed during the papacy of Pope Julius II as Bishop of Città Ducale. He served as Bishop of Città Ducale until his death in 1511.

== External links and additional sources ==
- Cheney, David M. "Diocese of Città Ducale". Catholic-Hierarchy.org. (for Chronology of Bishops) ^{[self-published]}
- Chow, Gabriel. "Titular Episcopal See of Città Ducale (Italy)". GCatholic.org. (for Chronology of Bishops) ^{[self-published]}

Catholic Church titles
Preceded by Matteo Mignano de Orsini	Bishop of Città Ducale; 1508–1511	Succeeded by Giacomo de Massimi
