= Gaspare Ricciullo del Fosso =

Italian Roman Catholic archbishop (1496–1592)

Most Reverend Gaspare Ricciullo del Fosso
- Archbishop of Reggio Calabria
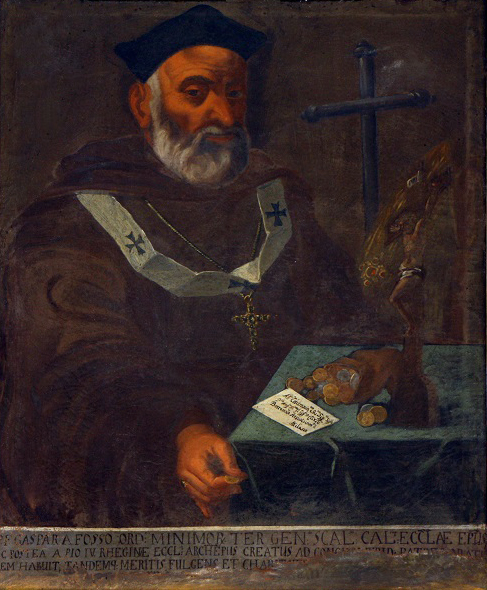
- Church: Catholic Church
- Archdiocese: Archdiocese of Reggio Calabria
- In office: 1560–1592
- Predecessor: Agostino Gonzaga
- Successor: Annibale D'Afflitto
- Previous posts: Bishop of Scala (1548–1551); Bishop of Calvi Risorta (1551–1560)

Orders
- Ordination: November 1521

Personal details
- Born: 6 January 1496 Rogliano, Italy
- Died: 28 December 1592 (age 96) Reggio Calabria, Italy

Gaspare Ricciullo del Fosso, O.M. (1496–1592) was a Roman Catholic prelate who served as Archbishop of Reggio Calabria (1560–1592), Bishop of Calvi Risorta (1551–1560), and Bishop of Scala (1548–1551).

== Biography ==
Gaspare Ricciullo del Fosso was born in Rogliano, Italy on 6 January 1496 and ordained a priest in the Order of the Minims in November 1521. On 17 May 1548, he was appointed during the papacy of Pope Paul III as Bishop of Scala. On 22 April 1551, he was appointed during the papacy of Pope Julius III as Bishop of Calvi Risorta. On 17 July 1560, he was appointed during the papacy of Pope Pius IV as Archbishop of Reggio Calabria. He served as Archbishop of Reggio Calabria until his death on 28 December 1592.

== External links and additional sources ==
- Cheney, David M. "Diocese of Scala". Catholic-Hierarchy.org. (for Chronology of Bishops) ^{[self-published]}
- Chow, Gabriel. "Titular Episcopal See of Scala". GCatholic.org. (for Chronology of Bishops) ^{[self-published]}
- Cheney, David M. "Diocese of Calvi". Catholic-Hierarchy.org. (for Chronology of Bishops) ^{[self-published]}
- Chow, Gabriel. "Diocese of Calvi". GCatholic.org. (for Chronology of Bishops) ^{[self-published]}
- Cheney, David M. "Archdiocese of Reggio Calabria-Bova". Catholic-Hierarchy.org. (for Chronology of Bishops) ^{[self-published]}
- Chow, Gabriel. "Metropolitan Archdiocese of Reggio Calabria–Bova". GCatholic.org. (for Chronology of Bishops) ^{[self-published]}

Catholic Church titles
Preceded by Lodovico Vanino de Theodoli	Bishop of Scala; 1548–1551	Succeeded by Costantino Piccioni
Preceded by Berenguer Gombau	Bishop of Calvi Risorta; 1551–1560	Succeeded by Giulio Magnani
Preceded by Agostino Gonzaga	Archbishop of Reggio Calabria; 1560–1592	Succeeded by Annibale D'Afflitto

Minims (religious order)
