= Berard of Carbio =

Christian saint

Saint Berard of Carbio O.F.M.
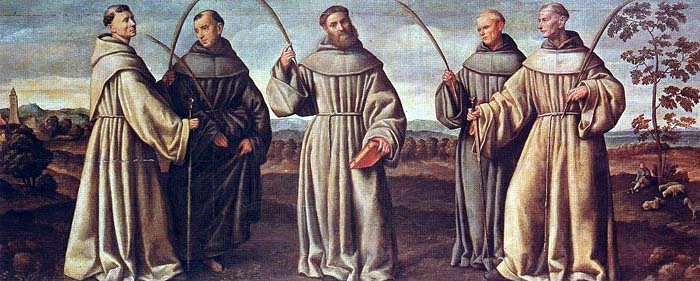

Religious, priest and martyr
- Born: unknown Carbio, Umbria, Papal States
- Died: 16 January 1220; Morocco
- Venerated in: Catholic Church (Franciscan Order)
- Canonized: 7 August 1481, Rome by Pope Sixtus IV
- Major shrine: Monastery of the Holy Cross, Coimbra, Portugal
- Feast: 16 January

Berard of Carbio was a thirteenth-century Franciscan friar who was executed in Morocco for attempting to promote Christianity. He and his companions, Peter, Otho, Accursius, and Adjutus, are venerated as Catholic saints and considered the Franciscan Protomartyrs. Expelled from the kingdom twice, they returned each time and continued to preach against Islam. In anger and frustration, the king finally beheaded them.

== Life ==
According to tradition, Berard was born into a noble family of Leopardi, and was a native of Carbio (modern-day Calvi dell'Umbria) in Umbria, a province of the Papal States. He was received into the newly founded Franciscan Order by Francis of Assisi in 1213. On the conclusion of the Second General Chapter of the Franciscan friars in 1219, Francis believed the time had then come for the friars of his Order to extend their apostolic labors beyond the Italian peninsula and northern Europe. Berard was well versed in Arabic, was an eloquent preacher, and was chosen by Francis, together with two other priests, Peter and Otho, and two lay brothers, Accursius and Adjutus, to evangelize in Morocco.

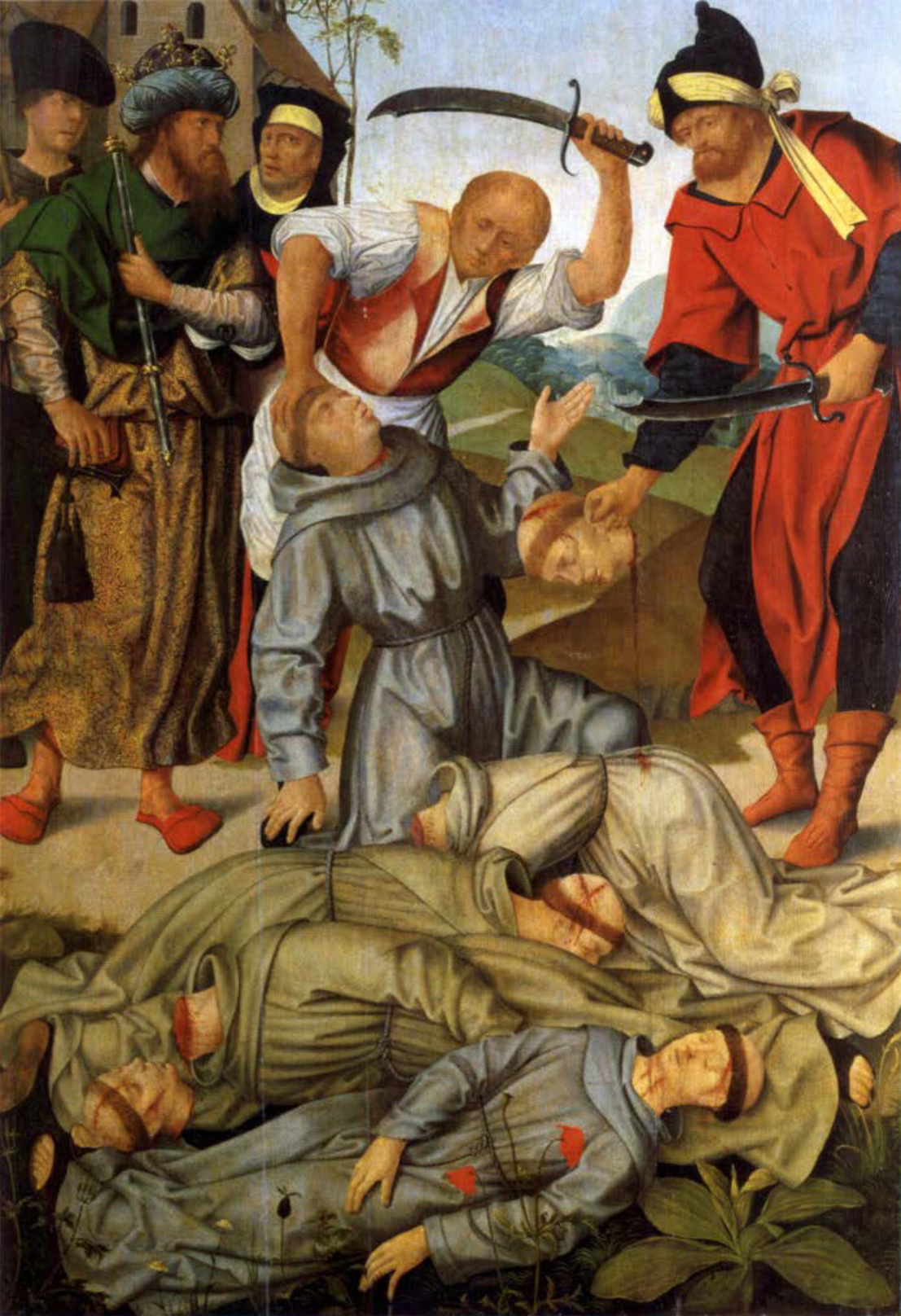
The Martyrs of Morocco, 1508, by Francisco Henriques (National Museum of Ancient Art, Lisbon)

The five missionaries set sail from Italy and arriving in Portugal, crossed into Spain and then to Seville, then still under Muslim rule, where their preaching antagonized the king. After imprisoning them for some three weeks, he expelled them to the Kingdom of Morocco. The only one of the five who knew any Arabic was Berard, and their open preaching of the Christian religion and their bold denunciation of Islam soon caused them to be viewed as insane. The king ordered them escorted to Ceuta and put aboard ships bound for Christian lands. However, the friars left the ships, returned to Morocco, and resumed preaching. They were then released and given guides to take them to Christian territory, but they once again returned. When it became clear that they would neither go away nor stop preaching, they were apprehended and cast into prison. Having vainly endeavored to persuade them to abandon their Catholic faith, the Moorish king, in a fit of rage, beheaded them with his scimitar, making them the first martyrs of the Franciscan Order.

When he heard of their deaths, Francis is reported to have said, "Now at least do I have true Friars Minor!" Upon the return of their bodies to Portugal, they were solemnly processed from there all the way to Assisi. A young Portuguese canon regular was so moved by their sacrifice when he saw this caravan pass by his monastery that he joined the Franciscan Order; he would later be known as Anthony of Padua.

== Veneration ==
Berard and his companions were canonized by Pope Sixtus IV in 1481. Their joint feast day is celebrated within the Franciscan Order on 16 January.
