= Giovanni Antonio Gallo =

Roman Catholic prelate

Most Reverend Giovanni Antonio Gallo
- Bishop of Calvi Risorta
- Church: Catholic Church
- Diocese: Diocese of Calvi Risorta
- In office: 1519–1543
- Predecessor: Matteo Orsini (bishop)
- Successor: Lorenzo Spada

Personal details
- Died: 1543 Calvi, Italy

Giovanni Antonio Gallo (died 1543) was a Roman Catholic prelate who served as Bishop of the Bishop of Calvi Risorta from 1519 to 1543.

== Biography ==
Gallo was appointed Bishop of the Bishop of Calvi Risorta by Pope Leo X on August 9, 1519. He served until his death in 1543.

== External links and additional sources ==
- Cheney, David M. "Diocese of Calvi". Catholic-Hierarchy.org. (for Chronology of Bishops) ^{[self-published]}
- Chow, Gabriel. "Diocese of Calvi (Italy)". GCatholic.org. (for Chronology of Bishops) ^{[self-published]}

Catholic Church titles
Preceded by Matteo Orsini (bishop)	Bishop of Calvi Risorta; 1519–1543	Succeeded by Lorenzo Spada
