= Lorenzo Litta =

Italian churchman

His Eminence Lorenzo Litta
- Vicar General of Rome
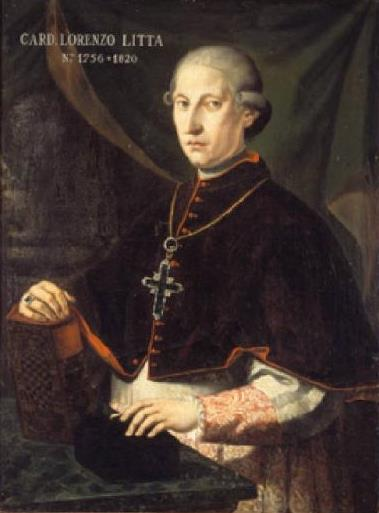
- Portrait painted between 1800-24.
- Church: Roman Catholic Church
- Diocese: Rome
- See: Rome
- Appointed: 28 September 1818
- Term ended: 1 May 1820
- Predecessor: Giulio Maria della Somaglia
- Successor: Annibale della Genga
- Other posts: Cardinal-Bishop of Sabina (1814–20); Cardinal-Protector of the Pontifical Ecclesiastical Academy (1817–20)
- Previous posts: Titular Archbishop of Thebae (1793–1801); Apostolic Nuncio to Poland (1794–96); Apostolic Nuncio to Russia (1797–99); Cardinal-Priest of Santa Pudenziana (1801–14); Prefect of the Congregation of the Index (1803–09); Camerlengo of the College of Cardinals (1806–07); Prefect of the Congregation of the Propagation of the Faith (1814–18)

Orders
- Ordination: 6 June 1789
- Consecration: 6 October 1793 by Luigi Valenti Gonzaga
- Created cardinal: 23 February 1801 (in pectore); 28 September 1801 (revealed) by Pope Pius VII
- Rank: Cardinal-Priest (1801–14); Cardinal-Bishop (1814–20)

Personal details
- Born: Lorenzo Litta; 23 February 1756 Milan, Duchy of Milan
- Died: 1 May 1820 (aged 64) Monteflavio, Sabina, Papal States
- Buried: Santi Giovanni e Paolo al Celio
- Parents: Pompeo Giulio Litta Visconti Arese; Maria Elisabetta Visconti Borromeo Arese
- Education: La Sapienza

Lorenzo Litta (23 February 1756 – 1 May 1820) was an Italian littérateur and churchman, who became a Cardinal.

== Biography ==
Litta was born in Milan, a member of the noble Litta family.

As a youth he was sent by his parents to the Clementine College in Rome, where he made rapid progress in letters and law. Not long after the completion of his studies he was made prothonotary Apostolic by Pope Pius VI. In 1793 he was consecrated titular Archbishop of Thebes, and sent as nuncio to Poland, where he arrived in March, 1794, shortly before the start of the uprising. Notwithstanding the difficulty of his own position, he used his influence with Tadeusz Kościuszko on behalf of the Catholic Church, and saved the life of Wojciech Skarszewski, Bishop of Chełm, already condemned to death for collaborating with Russians. He was not so successful with regard to the Bishop of Vilnius and Livonia Ignacy Jakub Massalski.

In the negotiations for the third partition of Poland, he tried to have the three states guarantee the preservation of the Church organization and property — guarantees which were violated by Catherine II of Russia. On her death Litta was sent on an extraordinary mission to Moscow for the coronation of Paul I of Russia, whence he was transferred as ambassador of Pius VI to St. Petersburg, to settle, according to Paul's wish, the affairs of the Latin and the Greek Catholic Ruthenian (Belarusian and Ukrainian) church. He secured the restoration of six dioceses of the Latin Rite and three of the Ruthenian (Połacak, Lutsk, and Brest). The restoration of the See of Kiev was prevented by the Russian Holy Synod. Church property was only partly restored, though the government was obliged to establish suitable allowances for the clergy.

Litta also induced the metropolitans of Gniezno, Poznań, and Lwów to renounce their jurisdiction over the dioceses of the Latin Rite in Russian occupied territory, these being transferred to the new metropolis of Mahiloŭ. Through his efforts also the Basilian Order was restored. In April, 1799, he had to leave Russia.

On the death of Pius VI he went to Venice to assist at the Papal conclave, 1799–1800. When he returned to Rome he was given an office in the papal treasury which enabled him to eradicate many abuses and introduce a better administration. In 1801 he was created cardinal and was made Prefect of the Congregation of the Index and, later, of Studies.

In 1809 he was expelled from Rome with Pope Pius VII and sent to Saint-Quentin on the Seine. During this exile he translated the Iliad, and wrote a series of letters containing a refutation of the four Gallican Articles of 1682, then the subject of much discussion. Some of these letters were addressed to Napoleon himself, and were later published anonymously.

Returning to Rome with Pius VII, Litta was made Prefect of Propaganda, which, under his administration, soon recovered its former status. In 1814, he became suburbicarian Bishop of Sabina, and in 1818 Cardinal Vicar of Rome.

He died at Monte Flavio, near Rome, and was buried at Rome in the church of SS. Giovanni e Paolo.
