= Berenguer Gombau =

Roman Catholic prelate

Most Reverend Berenguer Gombau
- Bishop of Calvi Risorta
- Church: Catholic Church
- Diocese: Diocese of Calvi Risorta
- In office: 1544–1551
- Predecessor: Lorenzo Spada
- Successor: Gaspare Ricciullo del Fosso

Personal details
- Died: 1551 Calvi Risorta, Italy

Berenguer Gombau (died 1551) was a Roman Catholic prelate who served as Bishop of Calvi Risorta (1544–1551).

== Biography ==
On 27 October 1544, Berenguer Gombau was appointed by Pope Paul III as Bishop of Calvi Risorta. He served as Bishop of Calvi Risorta until his death in 1551.

== External links and additional sources ==
- Cheney, David M. "Diocese of Calvi". Catholic-Hierarchy.org. (for Chronology of Bishops) ^{[self-published]}
- Chow, Gabriel. "Diocese of Calvi (Italy)". GCatholic.org. (for Chronology of Bishops) ^{[self-published]}

Catholic Church titles
Preceded by Lorenzo Spada	Bishop of Calvi Risorta; 1544–1551	Succeeded by Gaspare Ricciullo del Fosso
