= Latin Archbishopric of Thebes =

The Latin Archbishopric of Thebes is the see of Thebes in the period in which its incumbents belonged to the Latin or Western Church. This period began in 1204 with the installation in the see of a Catholic archbishop following the Fourth Crusade, while the Orthodox metropolitan bishop fled the city.

The Latin archbishop of Thebes was the senior-most of the Catholic clergy in the Duchy of Athens, which despite its name had its capital at Thebes. The archbishopric survived as a Latin residential see until 1456, when the duchy fell to the Ottoman Empire.

The see was later revived as a titular see, and has been vacant since 1965.

Like other Latin sees in the Latin states of Greece, the names and dates of election of the incumbents during the first century of its existence are unknown, as they were rarely communicated to the papal court. Along with many of his counterparts from other Latin sees of Greece, the anonymous archbishop of Thebes participated in the Fourth Council of the Lateran in 1215. In 1217–18 the archbishop was engaged in a dispute with the Latin Patriarch of Constantinople, Gervasius, who claimed direct jurisdiction over the monasteries in the duchy of Athens and intervened in the administration of the Thebean archdiocese.

== Residential archbishops ==
Name	Tenure	Notes
Nicholas	? – 31 July 1308	Subsequently Latin Patriarch of Constantinople
Isnard Tacconi	12 July 1308 – 4 August 1311	Subsequently Latin Patriarch of Antioch
Stephen	13 August 1311 – ?	
Isnard Tacconi	29 May 1326 – ?	Second tenure, held in tandem with the Patriarchate of Antioch
Philip	26 August 1342 – 17 June 1351	Previously Bishop of Salona. Subsequently Bishop of Conza
Sirello Pietro di Ancona	20 May 1351 – ?	
Paul	15 May 1357 – 17 April 1366	Subsequently Latin Patriarch of Constantinople
Simon Atumano	17 April 1366 ca. 1380	Notable humanist and scholar
Thomas of Negroponte	9 July 1387 – ?	Supporter of the Avignon anti-popes
Stephen		
Garcia	1 June 1387 – ?	
Benedict	18 May 1390 – ?	
Bernard	11 May 1405 – ?	
Antony		
Nicholas of Treviso	4 April 1410 – 11 August 1410	Subsequently Bishop of Nona
James	16 March 1411 – ?	
John of Pontremoli	23 February 1418 – ?	
Stephen	23 December 1429 – ?	

== Titular archbishops ==
Name	Tenure	Notes
Giuseppe Acquaviva	5 September 1621 – 1634	
Lelio Falconieri	14 December 1634 – 14 December 1648	Secretary of the Congregation for Bishops
Gianantonio Davia	21 June 1690 – 10 March 1698	Nuncio in Germany and Poland
Orazio Filippo Spada	15 September 1698 – 15 December 1704	
Nicola Gaetano Spinola	4 October 1706 – 12 April 1735	Cardinal in the Roman Curia
Felix Solazzo Castriotta	21 June 1745 – 9 March 1755	
Vitaliano Borromeo	16 February 1756 – 7 June 1793	Cardinal in the Roman Curia
Serafino Brancone	12 February 1759 – 15 August 1774	Benedictine, bishop emeritus of Gallipoli in Italy
Joaquín de Eleta	18 December 1769 – 27 December 1786	Franciscan
Lorenzo Litta	23 September 1793 – 28 September 1801	Nuncio in Poland and Russia
Giuseppe Morozzo Della Rocca	29 March 1802 – 8 March 1816	Nuncio and Secretary of the Congregation for Bishops
Ugo Pietro Spinola	2 October 1826 – 2 July 1832	Nuncio in Austria
Tommaso Pasquale Gizzi	18 February 1839 – 22 January 1844	Nuncio
Gaetano Bedini	15 March 1852 – 18 March 1861	Nuncio and Secretary of the Congregation for the Evangelization of Peoples
Mieczyslaw Halka Ledóchowski	30 September 1861 – 8 January 1866	Nuncio in Belgium
Luigi Biscioni (Bisconi) Amadori	23. September 1875 – ?	Bishop emeritus of Sansepolcro
Pietro Rota	4 November 1884 – 1890	Bishop emeritus of Mantua
Antonio Sabatucci	1 October 1890 – 14 March 1892	
Ladislaus Zaleski	5 March 1892 – 4 December 1916	Apostolic delegate of India
Giovanni Battista Nasalli Rocca di Corneliano	6 December 1916 – 21 November 1921	Secretary of the Roman Curia
Angelo Rotta	19 October 1922 – 1 February 1965	Nuncio

== Sources ==
- Setton, Kenneth M. (1976). The Papacy and the Levant (1204–1571), Volume I: The Thirteenth and Fourteenth Centuries. Philadelphia: The American Philosophical Society. ISBN 0-87169-114-0.
