= Giulio Monaco =

Catholic Bishop

Most Reverend Giulio Monaco
- Bishop of Lucera
- Church: Catholic Church
- Diocese: Diocese of Lucera
- In office: 1580–1581
- Predecessor: Pietro de Petris
- Successor: Scipione Bozzuti

Orders
- Consecration: 13 Nov 1580 by Giulio Antonio Santorio

Personal details
- Died: 1581 Lucera, Italy

Giulio Monaco (died 1581) was a Roman Catholic prelate who served as Bishop of Lucera (1580–1581).

== Biography ==
On 4 Nov 1580, Giulio Monaco was appointed during the papacy of Pope Gregory XIII as Bishop of Lucera. On 13 Nov 1580, he was consecrated bishop by Giulio Antonio Santorio, Cardinal-Priest of San Bartolomeo all'Isola, with Thomas Goldwell, Bishop of Saint Asaph, and Filippo Spinola, Bishop of Nola, serving as co-consecrators. He served as Bishop of Lucera until his death in 1581.

== External links and additional sources ==
- Cheney, David M. "Diocese of Lucera-Troia". Catholic-Hierarchy.org. (for Chronology of Bishops) ^{[self-published]}
- Chow, Gabriel. "Diocese of Lucera-Troi (Italy)". GCatholic.org. (for Chronology of Bishops) ^{[self-published]}

Catholic Church titles
Preceded by Pietro de Petris	Bishop of Lucera; 1580–1581	Succeeded by Scipione Bozzuti
