= Santa Maria Assunta, Calvi dell'Umbria =

Building in Calvi, Italy

Coordinates: 42°24′07″N 12°34′00″E

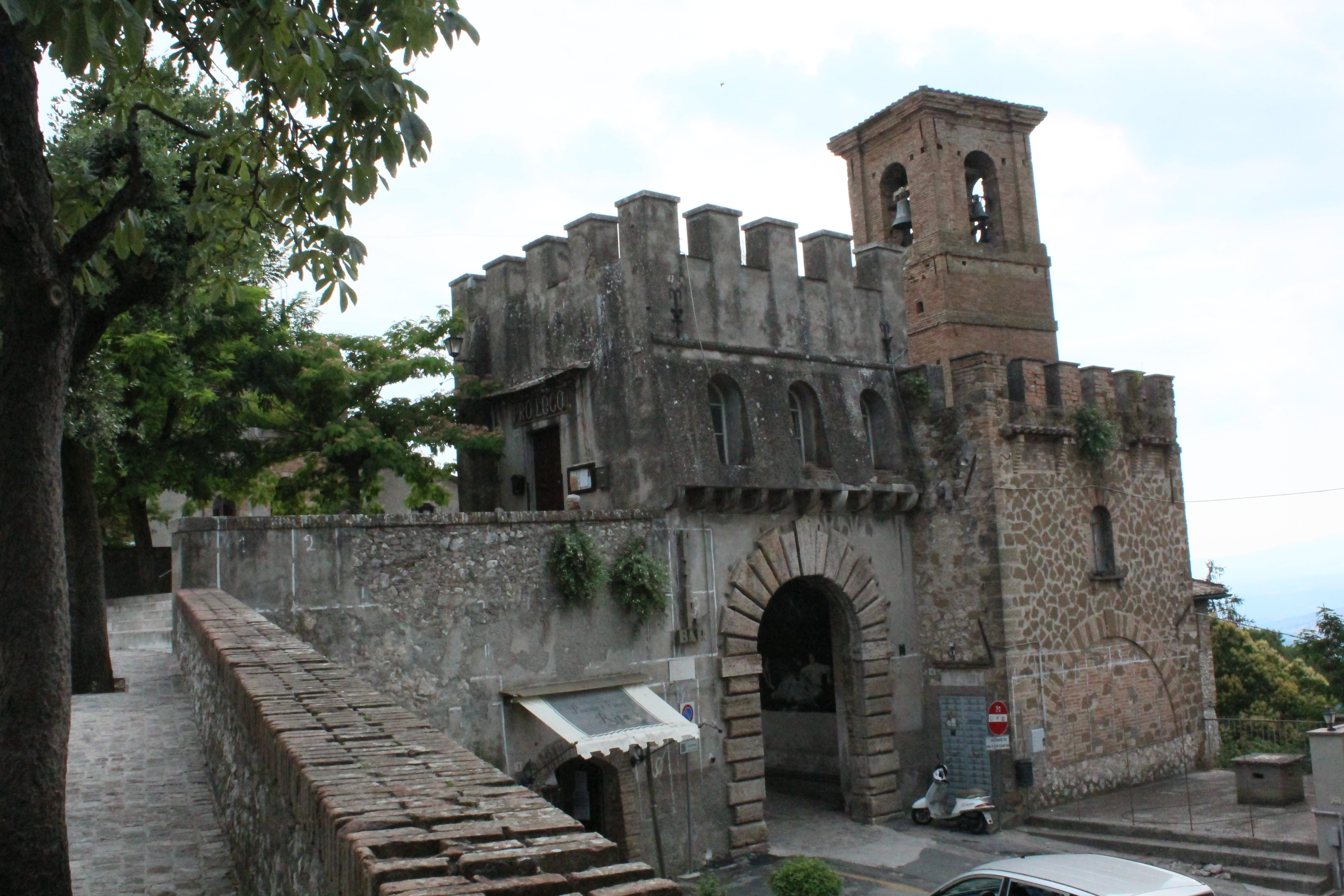
Belltower of the church with exterior Porta Ternana in foreground

Santa Maria Assunta is the main Roman Catholic church, located on Via Roma (once Via Sabina) near the Porta Ternana in the town of Calvi dell'Umbria, province of Terni, region of Umbria, Italy.

The church was initially built in the second half of the 13th century. The original facade faced the gateway into town, and now represents the Gothic-style mullioned windows along Via Roma. in the 1580s, the bell tower was erected. The present layout derives from an expansion during 1620–1659; this gave the church a single long nave with five side chapels. The choir in the apse. The organ derives from the 18th-century.

The main altarpiece depicts the Madonna of the Assumption and San Pancrazio (1737) by Salvatore Pierella. To the left of the nave is the Sernicoli chapel with an altarpiece depicting an Enthroned Madonna and Child between Saint Blaise and Berardo (circa 1630s) by the Cavalier d’Arpino. On the right of the nave, the Fioretti chapel has a canvas depicting the Circumcision of Jesus (1640) by Calisto Calisti of Bagnaia.

The Chapel of the Holy Rosary, belonging to the confraternity of the same name has a mid 1500s Flemish painting depicting a Madonna of the Rosary. The St Joseph Chapel has a canvas depicting the Marriage of the Virgin by Vincenzo Manenti and the Baptismal Chapel has a marble font (1559) sculpted with the coat of arms of the town of Calvi and of the aristocratic Ceri - Anguillara families.
