= Simon Atumano =

Greco-Turkish Catholic bishop

- Church: Catholic
- Archdiocese: Latin Archbishop of Thebes
- Diocese: Bishop of Gerace
- In office: 23 June 1348 – 1366

Personal details
- Born: Constantinople, Byzantine Empire (modern-day Istanbul, Turkey)

Simon Atumano (Greek: Σίμων ὁ Ἀτουμάνος) was the Bishop of Gerace in Calabria from 23 June 1348 until 1366 and the Latin Archbishop of Thebes thereafter until 1380. Born in Constantinople, Atumano was of Greco-Turkish origin, his surname deriving from the word "Ottoman." He was a humanist and an influential Greek scholar during the Italian Renaissance.

== Ecclesiastical and political career ==
On 17 April 1366, Pope Urban VI transferred Atumano to the see of Thebes in reward for his "great integrity." Atumano did not begin well with the Catalan Company which ruled Thebes as part of the Duchy of Athens at the time. He was described later as "a very lukewarm Catalan." While the Catalans supported the Avignon Papacy during the Western Schism, Atumano remained faithful to Rome.

In 1379, Atumano assisted the Navarrese Company under Juan de Urtubia to take Thebes. The details of the assistance he gave them are unknown, but it put him in further bad stead with the Catalans. However, Atumano got along no better with the Navarrese and sometime in 1380–1381 he fled to Italy, where he was at Rome in the winter of the latter year. He lost 1,500 florins of revenue from Thebes and lived thereafter in poverty "more acceptable in the sight of God," though the Peter IV of Aragon assumed that Atumano would receive a higher dignity from the Roman Pope. From Italy he wrote to Demetrius Cydonius about his worries for his flock and about the blasphemy and lack of respect for law of the Ispanoi, that is, the Navarrese.

== Translation work ==
Atumano undertook studies of Hebrew while in Thebes. In the mid-late 1370s, he began the composition of a Biblia Triglotta, a polyglot Latin-Greek-Hebrew bible written a century before the Complutensian Polyglot. Whether or not Atumano's interest in Hebrew was ignited by the large Jewish presence in Thebes is unknown, since it appears that the Jewish population there had dwindled significantly by the late fourteenth century. The Biblia Triglotta, dedicated to Urban VI, was never finished. He did, however, complete a Hebrew translation of the New Testament and a Greek translation of the Old Testament.

In 1373, Atumano translated the De remediis irae of Plutarch into Latin from Greek. In 1381–2 he taught Greek to Raoul de Rivo.

== Character ==
Atumano was praised by his contemporary, Frederick III of Sicily, for his "innate goodness and praiseworthy character" and by his twentieth-century biographer as "no common scholar." Coluccio Salutati, the famous Florentine humanist, praised him to Petrarch as a vir mult[a]e venerationis: man highly venerated. He was made a citizen of the Republic of Venice. Even the Antipope Clement VII referred to him as of bon[a]e memori[a]e (good memory).

However, some latter day historians, especially the Catalan Antonio Rubió y Lluch, have labelled him an untrustworthy scoundrel on the basis of four documents in the archives of the Crown of Aragon in Barcelona dated to 1381 and 1382. In one of the letters, Peter IV of Aragon requests that Urban VI remove Atumano from Thebes and replace him with John Boyl, the Bishop of Megara, exiled from his see since the Florentine occupation of 1374. According to the letter, Atumano fled to Italy when still a Greek monk on account of nefarious sins for which, Peter claims, he would have been burned alive. In Italy, he adds, Atumano succeeded in "parading himself as a man of honour" and so obtaining the archdiocese from Pope Gregory XI. The letter, however, is probably mere calumny, as the "only verifiable information given" is readily falsified: Gregory was not Pope when Atumano received the archbishopric.

== Sources ==
- Setton, Kenneth M. Catalan Domination of Athens 1311–1380. Revised edition. London: Variorum, 1975.
- Setton, Kenneth M. "The Byzantine Background to the Italian Renaissance." Proceedings of the American Philosophical Society, Vol. 100, No. 1. (Feb. 24, 1956), pp 1–76.

Catholic Church titles
Preceded by Paul	Latin Archbishop of Thebes; 1366 – ca. 1380	Unknown Title next held by Thomas of Negroponte (under the Avignon anti-papacy)
