= Scipione Bozzuti =

Italian Catholic bishop (died 1591)

Most Reverend Scipione Bozzuti
- Bishop of Lucera
- Church: Catholic Church
- Diocese: Diocese of Lucera
- In office: 1582–1591
- Predecessor: Giulio Monaco
- Successor: Marco Magnacervo
- Previous post: Bishop of Calvi Risorta (1580–1582)

Personal details
- Died: 1591 Lucera, Italy

Scipione Bozzuti (died 1591) was a Roman Catholic prelate who served as Bishop of Lucera (1582–1591) and Bishop of Calvi Risorta (1580–1582).

== Biography ==
On 24 February 1580, during the papacy of Pope Gregory XIII, Bozzuti was appointed as Bishop of Calvi Risorta. On 14 February 1582, he was appointed Bishop of Lucera. He served as Bishop of Lucera until his death in 1591.

== External links and additional sources ==
- Cheney, David M. "Diocese of Calvi". Catholic-Hierarchy.org. (for Chronology of Bishops) ^{[self-published]}
- Chow, Gabriel. "Diocese of Calvi (Italy)". GCatholic.org. (for Chronology of Bishops) ^{[self-published]}
- Cheney, David M. "Diocese of Lucera-Troia". Catholic-Hierarchy.org. (for Chronology of Bishops) ^{[self-published]}
- Chow, Gabriel. "Diocese of Lucera-Troi (Italy)". GCatholic.org. (for Chronology of Bishops) ^{[self-published]}

Catholic Church titles
Preceded by Ascanio Marchesini	Bishop of Calvi Risorta; 1580–1582	Succeeded by Fabio Maranta
Preceded by Giulio Monaco	Bishop of Lucera; 1582–1591	Succeeded by Marco Magnacervo
