= Peter Thomas (saint) =

French Carmelite friar and Catholic saint (1305–1366)

Saint Peter Thomas OCarm
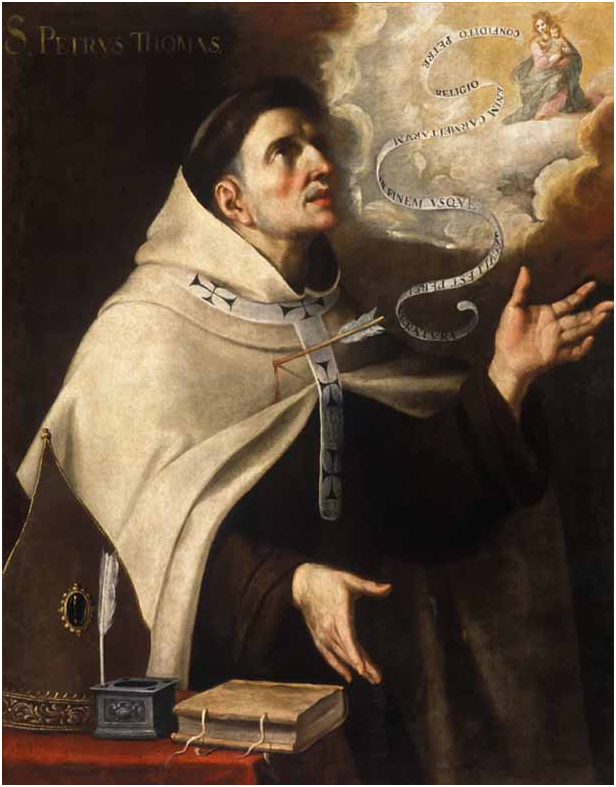

Archbishop of Crete Latin Patriarch of Constantinople Missionary
- Born: 1305; Périgord
- Died: 1366; Famagusta
- Venerated in: Roman Catholic Church
- Beatified: 1609 by Pope Paul V
- Canonized: 1628 by Pope Urban VIII
- Feast: January 8

Peter Thomas, OCarm (1305–1366), also known as Petrus de Thomas or Pierre de Thomas, was a French Carmelite friar, preacher, and teacher. He was entrusted with a number of diplomatic missions by the Holy See. Thomas was canonized by Pope Urban VIII in 1628.

== Life ==
Peter Thomas was born around the year 1305 to a very poor family in Périgord. His father was a serf. At the age of twelve, he left his parents and his younger sister to ease the burdens on his family and went to the nearby small town of Monpazier. He attended school for about three years, living on alms and teaching younger pupils. He led the same type of life at Agen, studying at the College of the Carmelites until the age of twenty, when he returned to Monpazier briefly, before going to Lectoure.

=== Carmelite friar ===
In 1325 the prior of the Carmelite convent of Lectoure employed Thomas as a teacher for a year in that school. He entered the Carmelite Order at the age of twenty-one and made his profession of religious vows at Bergerac where he taught for two years. He studied philosophy at Agen, where he was ordained a priest three years later. For the next few years, he continued his studies, while also teaching in Bordeaux, Albi, and again in Agen. This was followed by three years of study in Paris. He was preaching in Cahors, during a procession held in hopes of an end to a serious drought, when rain began to fall. This was viewed by many as miraculous.

In 1345 he was the Order's Procurator General and an official preacher at the Papal Court of Pope Clement VI at Avignon where he then assisted the Master of Theology as head of the curia department dealing with doctrinal matters submitted to the pope.

=== Diplomat ===
In October 1353, Pope Innocent VI appointed legate to regularizing relations between the rival republics of Venice and Genoa. The parties failed to find any ground of agreement and the attempt at mediation was not successful. In 1348, he was sent to the Kingdom of Naples in order to negotiate an agreement concerning the appointment of the tutor of the daughters of the late Charles of Durazzo. His widow (Marie d'Anjou) and the King of Naples had one candidate, and the paternal grandmother of the children had another. Although she was the sister of Cardinal Hélie Talleyrand, the King prevailed.

=== Bishop ===
In 1354 he was made bishop of Patti and Lipari and was sent to Serbia with the main objectives of putting an end to the vexatious measures against the Catholics of Serbia and evaluating the intentions of Stefan Dušan concerning his desire to unify the Orthodox Church of Serbia with the Roman Catholic Church. Dusan's goal was in fact to find political support in order to set out, under the cover of defense of the Catholic faith, to conquer Byzantium and its Empire. In view of the complex geopolitical situation and the lack of honesty of the ruler of Serbia, this mission of Peter Thomas did not succeed, in spite of his efforts.

In the spring of 1356, Thomas, with the Dominican Guglielmo Conti, bishop of Sizebolu, went to Venice and met with Louis I of Hungary to arrange a peace treaty between Venice and Hungary over Dalmatia, but despite his efforts, the negotiations became bogged down and no peace treaty was signed. In April 1357, Thomas went as papal legate to Constantinople, to receive the submission of the Emperor of Byzantium to the Roman Catholic Church in exchange for military support of the West to block the expansion of the Ottoman Empire. But the military supports promised in the exchanges does not materialize. In 1358, Peter Thomas went on a private pilgrimage to the Holy Land.

In 1359, Pope Innocent VI appointed Peter Thomas Universal Legate for the East. In the summer of 1359, Bishop Thomas left for Smyrna accompanied by a fleet supplied by the Venetians and the Hospitallers of Rhodes. He strengthened the city's defenses, paid the soldiers, ensured the supply of the city and the appointment of a new governor. He also went to Constantinople and took part in the battles of Lampsach. Philippe de Mezières wrote: "Physically involved in the battle, Pierre Thomas stimulated the troops: it was necessary to avoid a stampede [in front of the janissaries]. The bishop gave of himself, he encouraged, he struck, sword in fist ". Between defeats and victories, Pierre Thomas was "tireless, leading the troops into battle by his example and his exhortations, sometimes in Smyrna, sometimes in Rhodes, sometimes in Constantinople, sometimes in Cyprus, sometimes in the island of Crete, and sometimes in Turkey with a few galleys".

At Christmas 1359, Thomas was in Rhodes and sick with a long illness but had recovered sufficiently by Easter to perform the coronation of Peter I of Cyprus and Eleanor of Aragon as king and queen of Jerusalem in Famagusta on April 5, 1360. At the end of 1361 he was in Cyprus at the time of a great plague epidemic and organized masses, prayers, and processions in Nicosia and then in Famagusta to stop the plague.

=== Crusade of Alexandria ===
In October 1362, Peter Thomas, Peter I of Cyprus and chancellor Philippe de Mezières left Paphos to seek financial, logistical and military support in Europe for a crusade to deliver the holy places and re-establish the kingdom of Jerusalem. They stopped in Avignon where Pierre Thomas explained his Crusade project to Urban V, whose official approval he obtained on 31 March 1363. Thomas was appointed Archbishop of Crete.

It was agreed that Venice would be the rallying point and Urban V asked Peter Thomas to go to Venice and stay there while waiting for the King of Cyprus to return from his tour of the Royal Courts of Europe. Peter I of Cyprus6 joined him only on November 1364 without having obtained important financial results or pledges of manpower. The King discouraged, however, Thomas and Mezières managed to persuade him to proceed. In the meantime, Thomas was sent to work out a peace treaty between Milan and Bologna. Then war broke out between Cyprus and Genoa, and Urban V sent him to negotiate terms there as well. In 1364 Thomas became the Latin Patriarch of Constantinople.

Finally, in June 1365, they set sail with their troops described as follows: "the reduced image of what was then the Western Chivalry. A few Englishmen and Scotsmen ...A few Teutonic knights: very few Italians... Mostly French." The troops at their disposal were weak, but Pierre Thomas and his companions hoped that reinforcements would be sent to them, in the event of a first striking victory. The fleet rendezvoused at Rhodes in mid-July with the fleet of the Hospitallers of Rhodes as well as the fleet from Cyprus.

On 9 October 1365, the galleys and ships of Peter I of Cyprus disembarked in the port of Alexandria. It was captured quickly and the crusaders were in the city the next day. Once in the city, the Christians ransacked the city, looted it, partially burned it and massacred its population. On October 11, 1365, the city was taken. But this victory was short-lived because the crusader soldiers, motivated by the lure of gain, were seized with fear at the idea that the Saracens would come to the rescue of the besieged city, which they soon did. After consultation and against the advice of Peter I of Cyprus and Peter Thomas who urged them to hold out, the Crusaders with their rich booty, re-embarked for Cyprus on 16 October 1365.

== Death and burial ==
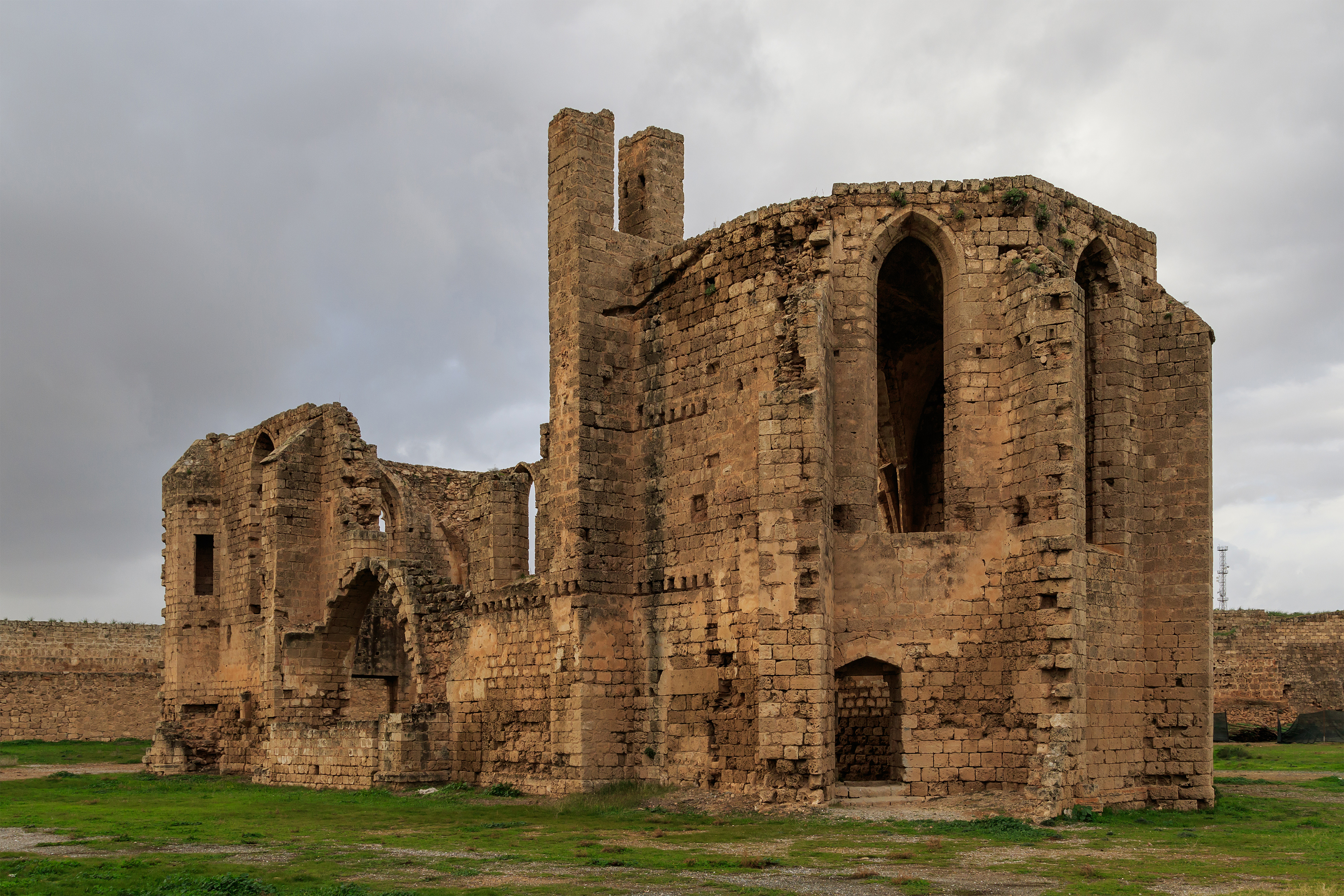
Ruins of Carmelite Church, Famagusta

Pierre Thomas, as Latin Patriarch of Constantinople and Legate of the Crusade, planned go to Avignon to make his report and ask for support and means to resume the Crusade. He went to Famagusta to organize his trip. Around Christmas 1365, Thomas fell seriously ill. The cause of his death is not certain because two versions are circulating. The first is that Pierre Thomas caught a cold during the celebrations of the Nativity by living too austerely and without taking into account the rigors of winter, which caused a fever that led to his death. The second hypothesis is that Thomas had been was injured during the capture of Alexandria and that his death followed his wound. He died during the night of January 6-7, 1366 at Famagusta and buried in the choir of the church of the Carmelites.

== Veneration ==
Considered a saint during his lifetime by the people of Cyprus because he was known for his preaching, his virtuous and ascetic life and the fact that miracles were attributed to him already during his lifetime, the ecclesiastical process was initiated in Famagusta by the bishop Simon of Laodicea, on April 14, 1366. Peter I of Cyprus asked Pope Urban V to initiate a canonization procedure and also that the transfer of the body of Peter Thomas outside the island of Cyprus be forbidden before a period of ten years. This decision, dated May 21, 1368, would be widely exceeded because the body of the saint would never be transferred outside the island. The last wish of Pierre Thomas to bring his mortal remains back to Bergerac, was therefore never respected.

No trace of Peter Thomas remains: the conquest of Cyprus by the Turks in 1571 and the earthquake of 1735 erased all memory of him on the island. In Salles-de-Belvès (France), the small chapel erected on the presumed site of the saint's birthplace was destroyed during the French Revolution. A relic of St. Peter Thomas may have been in the cathedral of Cahors for a time. Before his death, Peter Thomas gave a relic of the Holy Cross to Philippe de Mézières, who, donated it to the Scuola Grande of the church of San Giovanni Evangelista in Venice. This relic is currently kept in the church of San Giovanni Evangelista in Venice. This relic, in addition to its status as a primary relic of the Passion of Christ, can be considered a secondary relic of Peter Thomas because it belonged to and was therefore touched by St. Peter Thomas himself.

The cult of Peter Thomas was confirmed by Pope Paul V and in 1628, Urban VIII ratified his cult among the Carmelites for the dioceses of Sarlat and Périgueux. Saint Peter Thomas is currently celebrated on January 6 in the Catholic Church, but on January 8 in the Carmelite Order (as an optional memorial for the DIscalced Carmelites and as a Feast for the Ancient Order of Carmel) and in the diocese of Périgueux.

Saint Peter Thomas is depicted in an altarpiece painted by Francisco de Zurbarán for the College of San Alberto, Seville, which is currently held by the Museum of Fine Arts, Boston.

== Sources ==
There are two biographies written about Peter Thomas: one by Philippe de Mézières (d. 1405), chancellor of King Peter I of Cyprus and the other by the Franciscan John Carmesson, minister of the province of the Holy Land, who had delivered the funeral eulogy.

Catholic Church titles
Preceded by William	— TITULAR — Latin Patriarch of Constantinople; 1364–1366	Succeeded by Paul
