= Paul, Latin Patriarch of Constantinople =

Paul (died 1371) was a Roman Catholic bishop from southern Italy who held various episcopal sees in the Latin East, before becoming titular Latin Patriarch of Constantinople. He was engaged in several negotiations for a possible Union of the Churches with the Byzantine Empire.

== Life ==
Paul's early life is obscure; he hailed from southern Italy, and was Roman Catholic (Latin) bishop of Amisos until 10 July 1345, when he was appointed Latin Archbishop of Smyrna, a town on the Anatolian mainland that had been recently captured from the Aydinid Turks and was still threatened by them.

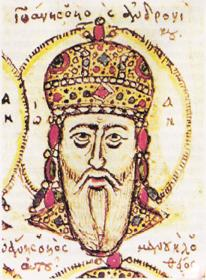
Miniature portrait of John V Palaiologos in advanced age

In 1355, following the Ottoman capture of Gallipoli in the previous year, Paul entered into negotiations with the Byzantine emperor, John V Palaiologos, for a rapprochement between Byzantium and the Catholic Church, in exchange for Western military aid. Paul secured considerable concessions from the hard-pressed emperor, including the active promotion of the Latin Church and even the Latin language, the dispatch of his son Manuel as a hostage to the papal court, and the establishment of a permanent papal legation in Constantinople. During his stay in Constantinople, Paul also took part in a theological disputation between Gregory Palamas and Nikephoros Gregoras. In early 1356, Paul, accompanied by the Byzantine ambassador, the megas hetaireiarches Nicholas Sideros, set sail for the papal court at Avignon, where they arrived in early June. Pope Innocent VI answered to the emperor's offers with generalities, and avoided to commit himself to the dispatch of military aid, but sent Peter Thomas and William Conti as papal envoys to Constantinople. The differing priorities and conceptions of the Byzantines and Latins contributed to the petering out and eventual failure of the negotiations: a 1357 letter by John V remained unanswered by Innocent VI until his death in 1362.

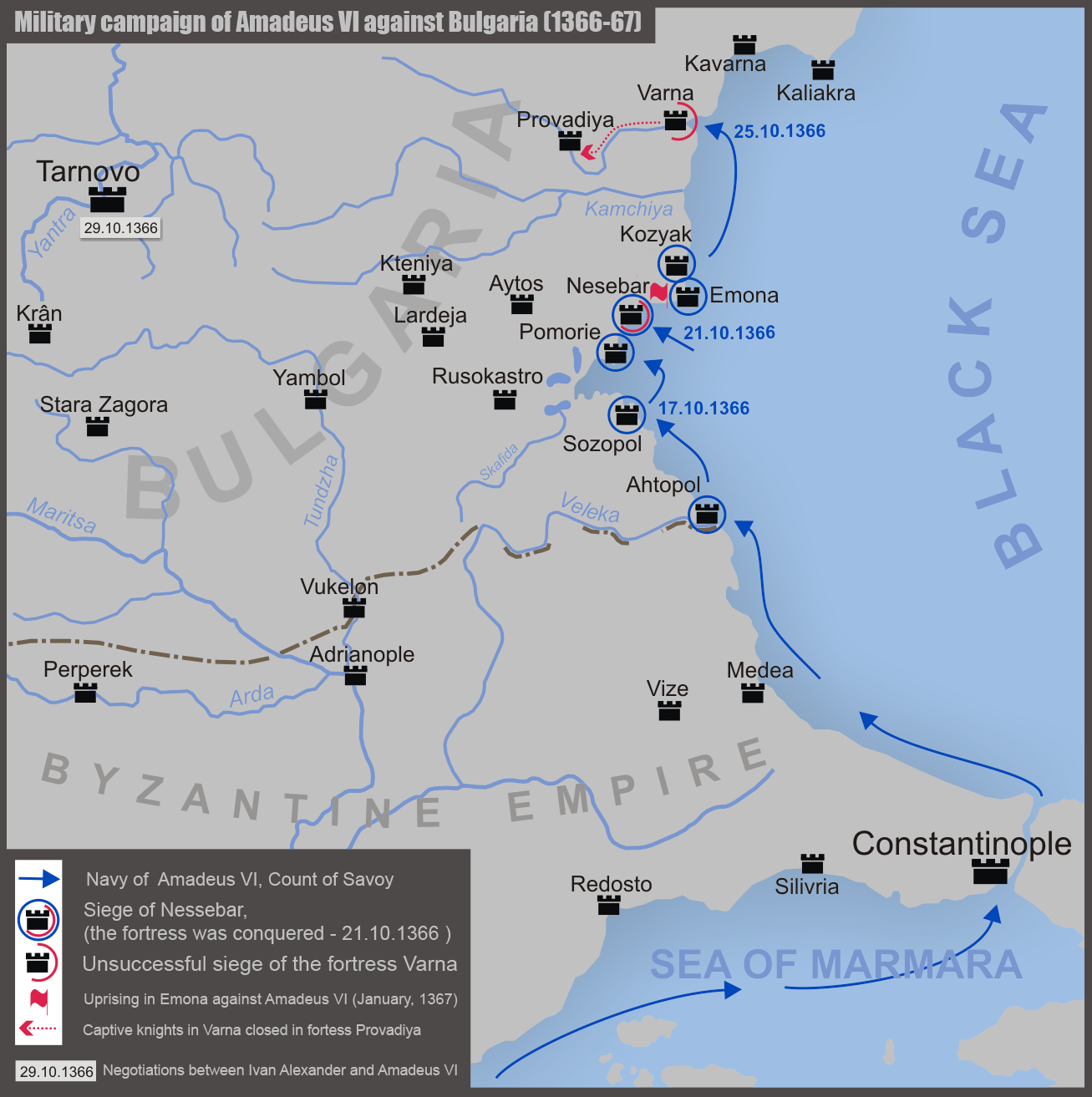
Map of Amadeus VI's Bulgarian campaign

On 15 May 1357, Paul was named Latin Archbishop of Thebes in central Greece, a post he held until 17 April 1366, when he was named titular Latin Patriarch of Constantinople. In 1366–67, Paul played an active part in the Savoyard crusade of Amadeus VI, Count of Savoy, due to his first-hand knowledge of Byzantine internal affairs and politics. In the autumn of 1366, during Amadeus' campaign against the Bulgarians, who held John V captive at the Bulgarian fortress of Vidin, Paul headed a Crusader embassy to the Bulgarian capital, Tirnovo. There he secured the ransoming of a number of Crusader leaders taken captive, as well as of emperor John, in exchange for Amadeus lifting the siege of Varna. In gratitude for his assistance during the crusade, Amadeus gifted Paul with a grey palfrey worth a hundred gold ducats, and wrote to Pope Urban V, recommending that Paul be appointed to the lucrative Latin Archbishopric of Patras, which had recently been vacated through the death of its incumbent, Angelo I Acciaioli. Indeed, on 20 October 1367 the Pope appointed Paul as apostolic administrator of the vacant see.

Before his departure for Italy, Amadeus had resumed negotiations with John V for a Union of the Churches. Both the Count and Paul tried to ensure the emperor's commitment to the project by asking for a loan on his behalf to enable Amadeus to return to Italy, in exchange for ceding to him the fortresses that the Savoyards had recently captured, and in exchange of a promise for John himself to appear before the Pope within a short time. Before Paul's and Amadeus' final departure for Italy in June 1367, a disputation was held in the imperial palace between Paul and the former emperor and monk John VI Kantakouzenos—the Orthodox Patriarch of Constantinople had refused to treat with Paul—before the imperial couple, their sons, and three senior Byzantine prelates. In the disputation, Kantakouzenos managed to convince Paul that in order to resolve the doctrinal differences between East and West, an ecumenical council should be held at Constantinople in the next two years.

The notion of an ecumenical council was quickly rejected by the Pope, but John V's visit to the papal court did indeed materialize, with the Byzantine emperor going to Italy and meeting the Pope at Rome in October 1369, where the emperor embraced the Catholic doctrine. Despite John's public submission to the papacy, however, the rewards he and other pro-Westerners in his court had hoped for failed to materialize, and despite John's personal conversion, the prospect of a full Union of the Churches on Rome's terms remained deeply unpopular and was rejected both by the Byzantine church and the populace.

Paul died in January or early February 1371.

== Sources ==
- Nicol, Donald M. (1993). The Last Centuries of Byzantium, 1261–1453 (Second ed.). Cambridge: Cambridge University Press. ISBN 978-0-521-43991-6.
- Setton, Kenneth M. (1976). The Papacy and the Levant (1204–1571), Volume I: The Thirteenth and Fourteenth Centuries. Philadelphia: The American Philosophical Society. ISBN 0-87169-114-0.
- Trapp, Erich; Beyer, Hans-Veit; Walther, Rainer; Sturm-Schnabl, Katja; Kislinger, Ewald; Leontiadis, Ioannis; Kaplaneres, Sokrates (1976–1996). "22143. Παῦλος". Prosopographisches Lexikon der Palaiologenzeit (in German). Vienna: Verlag der Österreichischen Akademie der Wissenschaften. ISBN 3-7001-3003-1.

Catholic Church titles
Preceded by Benedict	Latin Archbishop of Smyrna; 10 July 1345 – 15 May 1357	Succeeded by Peter of Piacenza
Preceded by Peter of Ancona	Latin Archbishop of Thebes; 15 May 1357 – 17 April 1366	Succeeded by Simon Atumano
Preceded by Peter Thomas	— TITULAR — Latin Patriarch of Constantinople; 17 April 1366 – January/February 1371	Succeeded by Ugolino Malabranca de Orvieto
Preceded by Angelo I Acciaioli as Latin Archbishop of Patras	Apostolic administrator of the Latin Archbishopric of Patras; 20 October 1367 – 1369/70	Succeeded by John IV of Novacchio as Latin Archbishop of Patras
