= Giulio Magnani =

Bishop of Calvi Risorta from 1560–1565

- Bishop of Calvi Risorta
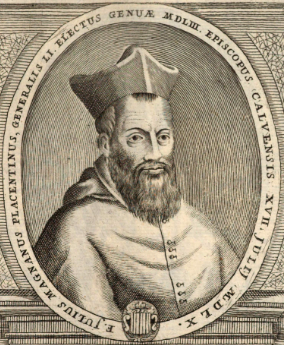
- Church: Catholic Church
- Diocese: Diocese of Calvi Risorta
- Appointed: 17 July 1560
- Term ended: 25 Sept 1565
- Predecessor: Gaspare Ricciullo del Fosso
- Successor: Paolo Terracino
- Other post: Minister General of Friars Minor Conventual

Orders
- Consecration: 28 July 1560 (Bishop) by Pompeo Zambeccari

Personal details
- Born: June 1505 Piacenza, Duchy of Milan
- Died: 25 September 1565 (aged 60) Teano, Kingdom of Naples

Giulio Magnani (Latin: Julius Magnanus; June 1505 – 25 September 1565) was a Roman Catholic prelate who served as Bishop of Calvi Risorta (1560–1565).

== Biography ==
Giulio Magnani was born in Piacenza in June 1505. He entered the Order of Friars Minor Conventual. He earned a Doctorate of Sacred Theology and in 1549 became Attorney General of his order. In 1551 he was appointed Vicar general of the Friars Minor Conventual and in Genoa in 1553 he was elected Minister General, an office he maintained up to 1559.

Giulio Magnani participated to Council of Trent, including also the sessions in the years 1545–1547 as delegate of his order. He was remembered as a gentle, erudite and austere man.

On 17 July 1560, he was appointed by Pope Pius IV as Bishop of Calvi Risorta. The episcopal consecration followed on 28 July 1560 in the Basilica of the Santi Apostoli in Rome by the hands of Pompeo Zambeccari.

Since 1560, he served as Bishop of Calvi Risorta until his death occurred in Teano on 25 September 1565. He was buried in the church of San Francesco in Teano.

Catholic Church titles
Preceded by Gaspare Ricciullo del Fosso	Bishop of Calvi Risorta; 1560–1566	Succeeded by Paolo Terracino
