= Radulph of Rivo =

Radulph of Rivo (also Radulph of Tongres, Radulph van der Beken, Raoul de Tongres, Radulphus de Rivo) was a Dutch Roman Catholic historian and liturgist (van der Beken is probably his birthname, as rivus usually stands for the Dutch beek).

== Biography ==
He was born about 1350 in Breda, in the present province of North Brabant (Netherlands). He studied in various parts of Europe: in 1362 in Italy, between 1367 and 1375 at the Paris Sorbonne university and Orléans, where he studied canon and civil law. In 1371 he was already subdeacon.

In 1377, as Canon of the chapter of Tongeren, he was granted the deanery of this institution by Gregory XI. He entered in this position only in 1383. Meanwhile, he returned to Italy. In 1381 he was in Rome, where he was taught Greek by Simon of Constantinople, titular Archbishop of Thebes (Greece). After 1390, he was replaced at Tongeren by a vice-dean. During this time, he joined the new University of Cologne (founded in 1388), where he became rector about 1397/1398. He made his last journey to Rome somewhat shortly before that date.

In 1398 he returned to Tongeren, where he resumed his duties as dean of the chapter. He was dedicated to the maintenance of discipline during the disturbance caused by the Great Schism of the West. He exerted himself especially for the reform of the liturgy. He was a protector and guide of the Windesheim reform, as for instance at the Corsendonck abbey. Several of his works date from this period, while his liturgical writings were mainly composed during his second stay at Rome. He died on 3 November 1403 and was buried in the St.-Mary monastery church at Tongeren.

== Works ==
Besides some works on Latin grammar, mention must be made of his Historia de rebus gestis trium pontificium Leodiensium, a chronicle of the bishops of Liège (published by Jean Chapeauville in 3 volumes, Liège, 1612–16).

His liturgical works are the most significant of his writings, especially for the history of the Breviary and the Mass. Here he displays a great spirit of piety, showing at the same time much critical ability, learning and wide reading. He is decidedly in favour of maintaining ancient Roman liturgical customs and rejects recent modifications.

Among his writings especially notable are:

- Liber de canonum observantia (ed. Hilthorp, Cologne, 1508, and in "Maxima Patrum Bibliotheca", Lyons, vol. XXVI, 289);
  - Proposition I (English translation)
  - Proposition XXII (English translation)
  - Proposition XXIII (English translation)
- Calendarius ecclesiasticus Generalis (printed Louvain, 1508);
- De psalterio observando
- Liber de Officiis ecclesiasticis

His most important writings were published by Mohlberg in 1915. In 2026 Gerhard Eger and Zachary Thomas published a new edition of the Calendarius ecclesiasticus generalis and Liber de canonum observantia with the first English translation and a study in the Brepols Library of Christian Sources.

== Bibliography ==
- MOHLBERG, Cunibert, Radulph de Rivo: der letzte Vertreter der altrömischen Liturgie, (Recueil de travaux publiés par les membres des conférences d’histoire et de philologie, 29+42), 1. Studien, 2. Texte, Leuven-Münster in Westfalen, Bureaux du recueil-Aschendorffsche Verlagsbuchhandlung, 1911–1915.
