= Calvi dell'Umbria =

- Comune
- Comune di Calvi dell'Umbria
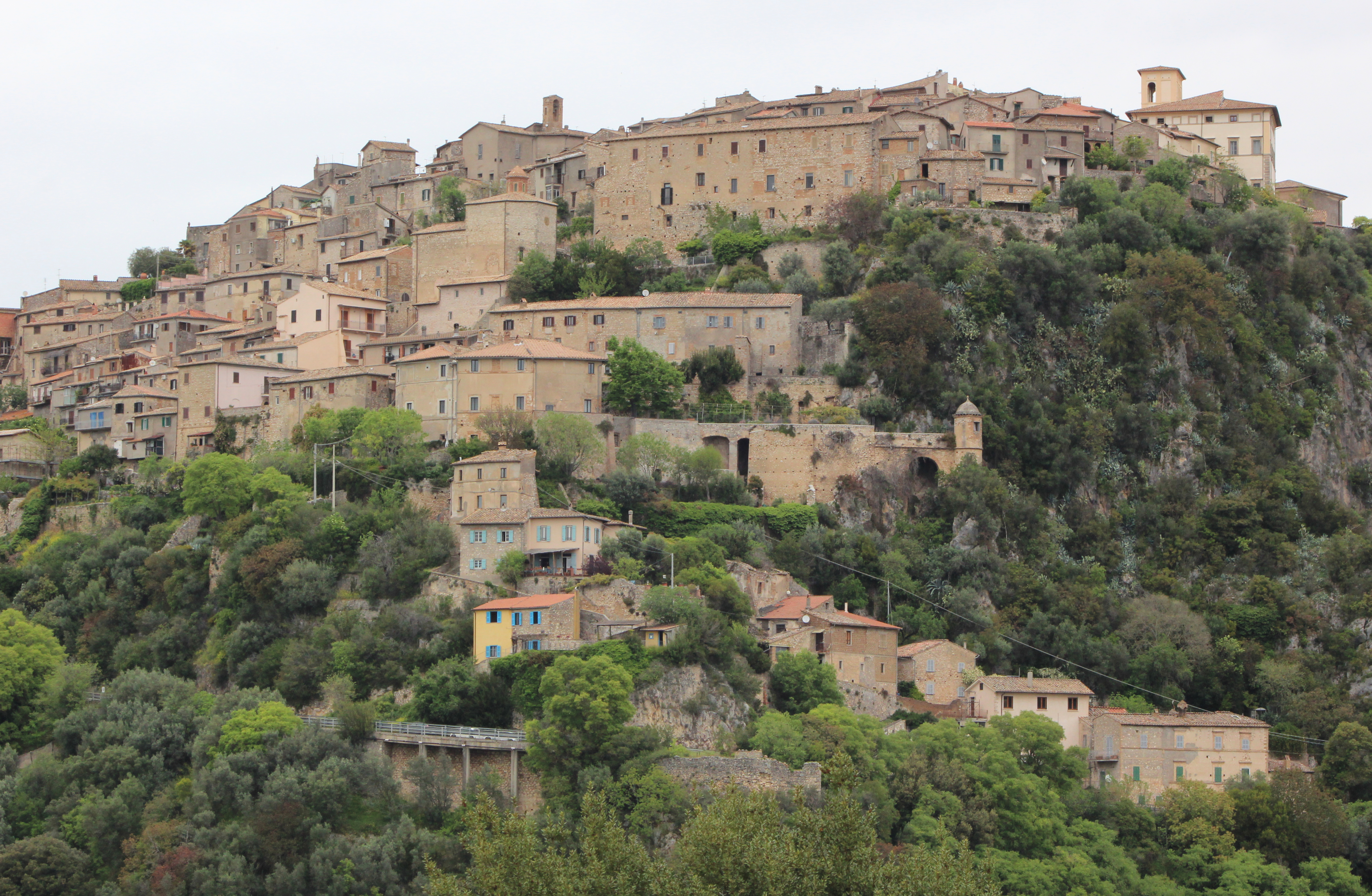
- View of Calvi dell'Umbria

- Coat of arms

- Location within Italy Location within Umbria
- Coordinates: 42.401432°N 12.567585°E
- Country: Italy
- Region: Umbria
- Province: Terni (TR)

Government
  - Mayor: Guido Grillini

Area
  - Total: 45.79 km^{2} (17.68 sq mi)
- Elevation: 401 m (1,316 ft)

Population (1 January 2025)
  - Total: 1,676
  - Density: 36.60/km^{2} (94.80/sq mi)
- Demonym: Calvesi
- Time zone: UTC+1 (CET)
  - Summer (DST): UTC+2 (CEST)
- Postal code: 05032
- Dialing code: 0744
- Patron saint: St. Pancratius
- Website: Official website

Calvi dell'Umbria is a comune (municipality) in the Province of Terni in the Italian region Umbria, located about 80 km south of Perugia and about 20 km southwest of Terni.

== Etymology ==
The name Calvi has been linked to the ancient Roman gens Calvia. An alternative interpretation derives it from Carbium, meaning a rocky road.

Adone Palmieri instead relates the name to Mons calvus, referring to the town's position on a barren rocky ridge historically noted for its lack of vegetation.

== History ==
Calvi dell'Umbria likely originated around the 9th century. A tradition that it was founded by inhabitants of the destroyed Ocrea (Ocriculum) is described in 19th century sources as unfounded.

Early references to the settlement appear under the name Carbi in the Farfa register. In 1082 Ascaro and Gebaldo of Carbi and Barbolano made a donation of land and property.

Historical records for the 11th and 12th centuries are limited. By 1261 the settlement had submitted to Narni while retaining its own local mayor, and it later developed as a free commune within the Papal State. Special municipal statutes were granted in 1376.

Disputes over territorial boundaries were settled in 1410 by legal experts. After a period of occupation by Braccio Fortebraccio, the town returned to papal control in 1420. Its municipal boundaries with Otricoli were formally fixed in 1451.

During the 16th and 17th centuries the area was governed by the Orsini and Anguillara families under the influence of the Church. The settlement suffered severe devastation from plague in 1527.

In 1527 it was granted in vicariate by Pope Clement VII to Renzo di Cesi and his direct male descendants, whose line became extinct with Lelio in 1572. In 1645 it was placed under the government of Sabina by papal authority, a condition that lasted until the time of Pope Leo XII. It later became a seat of government with authority over several neighbouring municipalities.

At the end of the 18th century, during the French campaigns in Italy, Calvi was the site of military conflict. In 1798 French forces, after breaching the walls near the Ursuline monastery, entered the town and engaged Neapolitan troops who had fortified themselves there. A prolonged battle was followed by the capture of the defenders and three days of looting and devastation. Subsequent engagements in the surrounding area led to the retreat of the Neapolitan forces.

In 1825 it was placed under the Delegation of Spoleto and assigned a castle protector. By 1829 it was classified as a local administrative district under Narni, and in 1850 it was incorporated into the province of Spoleto under Narni.

In 1860 the town was annexed to the Kingdom of Italy following a plebiscite in favor of union with the Kingdom of Sardinia, and it adopted the name Calvi dell'Umbria.

In the late 19th century the municipality had a population of 2,231 inhabitants.

== Geography ==
Calvi dell'Umbria stands at an elevation of 401 metres (1,316 ft) at the foot of Monte San Pancrazio, which rises to 1,020 metres (3,350 ft). At its base flows the stream known as the Rio di Pie' Calvi, a tributary of the Tiber. The town is located to the south-east of Narni, at a distance of 17 kilometres (11 mi).

Calvi lies about 3 miles (4.8 km) from Montebuono in Sabina and 7 miles (11 km) from the Via Flaminia. The settlement rises dramatically above the surrounding valley, with a sheer elevation of at least 200 metres (660 ft) on one side.

Nearby, on an elevated hill, stand two circular towers about 10 metres (33 ft) in diameter and 40 metres (130 ft) apart, traditionally known as windmills and long abandoned.

=== Subdivisions ===
The municipality includes the localities of Calvi dell'Umbria, Contrada Pacifici, La Corte, Poggiolo, San Francesco, San Giacomo, San Lorenzo, Santa Maria della Neve, Santa Maria Maddalena.

In 2021, 823 people lived in rural dispersed dwellings not assigned to any named locality. At the time, the most populous locality was Calvi proper (472).

== Economy ==
In the 19th century the local economy was based primarily on timber sales and the leasing of pasture. By the late 19th century it remained largely agricultural, alongside the presence of quarries, an explosives factory, and a distillery.

== Religion and culture ==
=== Santa Maria Assunta ===
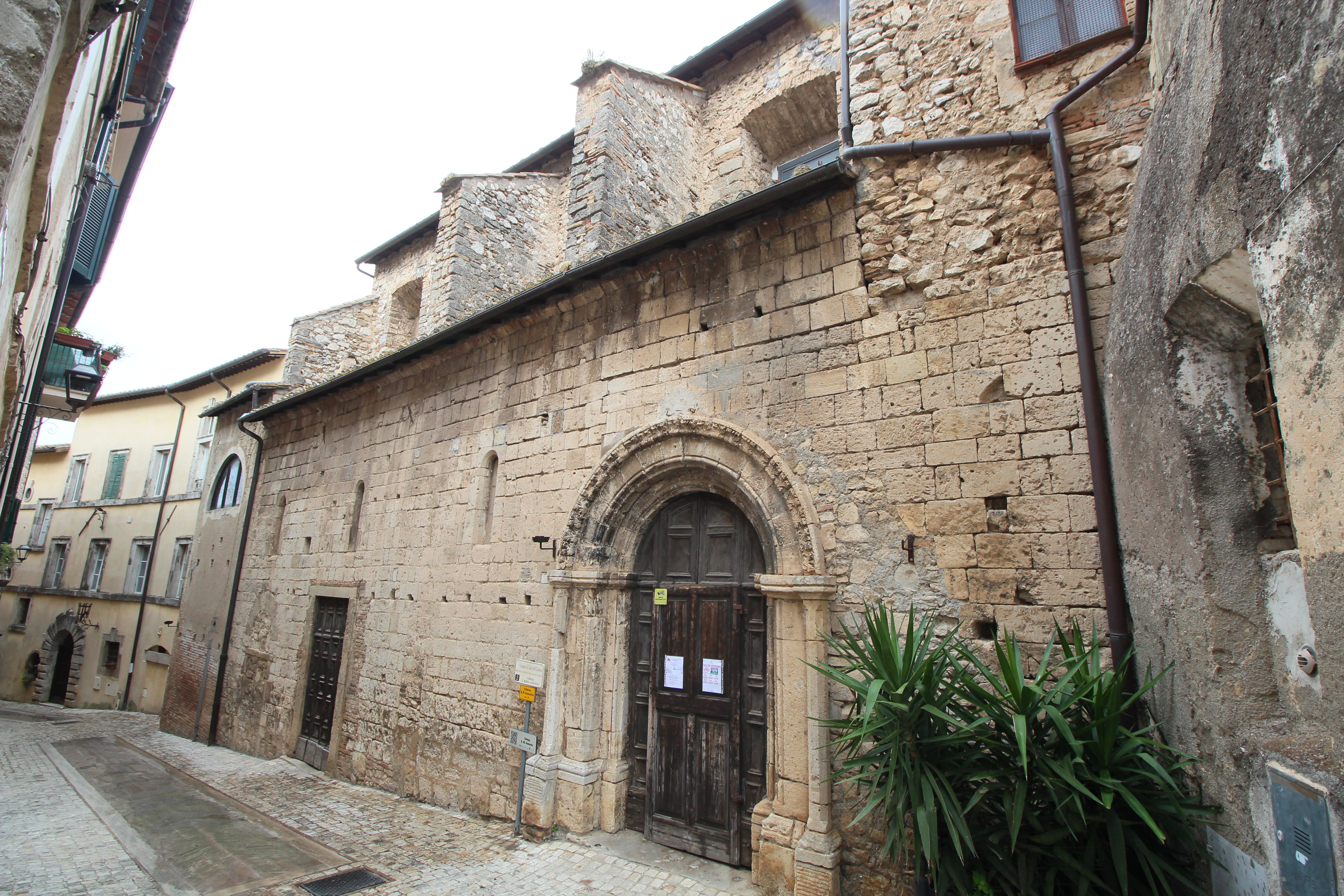
Church of Santa Maria Assunta

The church of Santa Maria Assunta is the most important church in the town. Its construction dates to the second half of the 13th century. The original building was smaller than the present one and had its façade facing the town gate. The church in its present form is the result of an enlargement carried out between 1620 and 1650 and is an example of Late Mannerist architecture.

In the presbyterial chapel at the center of the church is the high-altar canvas Madonna Assunta and Saint Pancras by Salvatore Pierella, dated 1737. In the Sernicoli Chapel on the left is Madonna Enthroned with the Child between Saints Blaise and Berard by Giuseppe Cesari, painted around the 1630s. In the Fioretti family chapel on the right is the Circumcision of Jesus by Calisto Calisti of Bagnaia, dated 1640..

Among the side chapels, the chapel of the Confraternity of the Most Holy Rosary contains a large Madonna of the Rosary by a Flemish painter from the late 1560s, while the chapel of Saint Joseph houses the Marriage of the Virgin by Vincenzo Manenti. The chapel now used for Baptism preserves a carved marble baptismal font dated 1559 bearing the arms of the community of Calvi and the Ceri-Anguillara family.

In the Chapel of the Sacrament there is a ciborium with a painted panel of the Risen Christ, attributed in style to Rinaldo di Calvi. The church was rebuilt in 1675 by the Arrighi family; it serves as a collegiate church.

=== Santissima Trinità ===
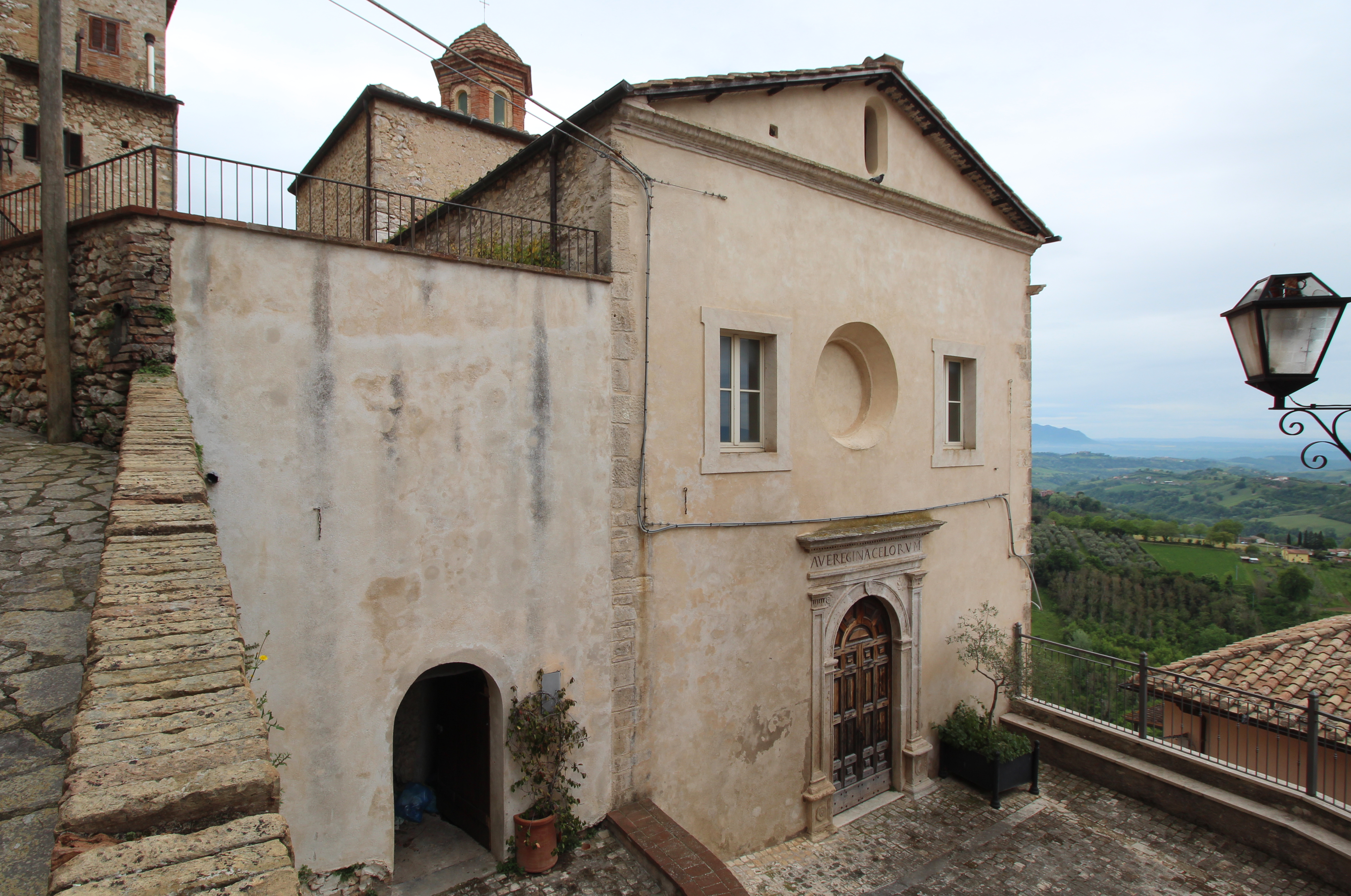
Church of the Santissima Trinità

The church of the Santissima Trinità, originally dedicated to the Madonna delle Grazie, was commissioned in 1523 and entrusted to the master Rinaldo Iacovetti. It was built on the site where an image of the Madonna painted on the wall of a house was believed to have miraculously wept.

It was also known as Madonna dello Sportello because it stood near an old gate of the town called lo Sportello, in the earlier line of walls before the settlement expanded downhill. The building rises on several levels along the rocky slope of the town. Its plan combines an octagon in the presbyterial area and a rectangle in the part reserved for the faithful. The former is covered by a dome and the latter by a groin vault, with the two spaces connected by a large triumphal arch.

Inside is a fresco of the Madonna and Child datable to the mid-15th century. On the exterior are a carved limestone portal with the inscription Ave Regina caelorum on the lintel, decorated roof tiles at the eaves, and an octagonal lantern marked by pilasters with terracotta moldings and capitals and covered with overlapping brick shingles.

=== San Francesco ===
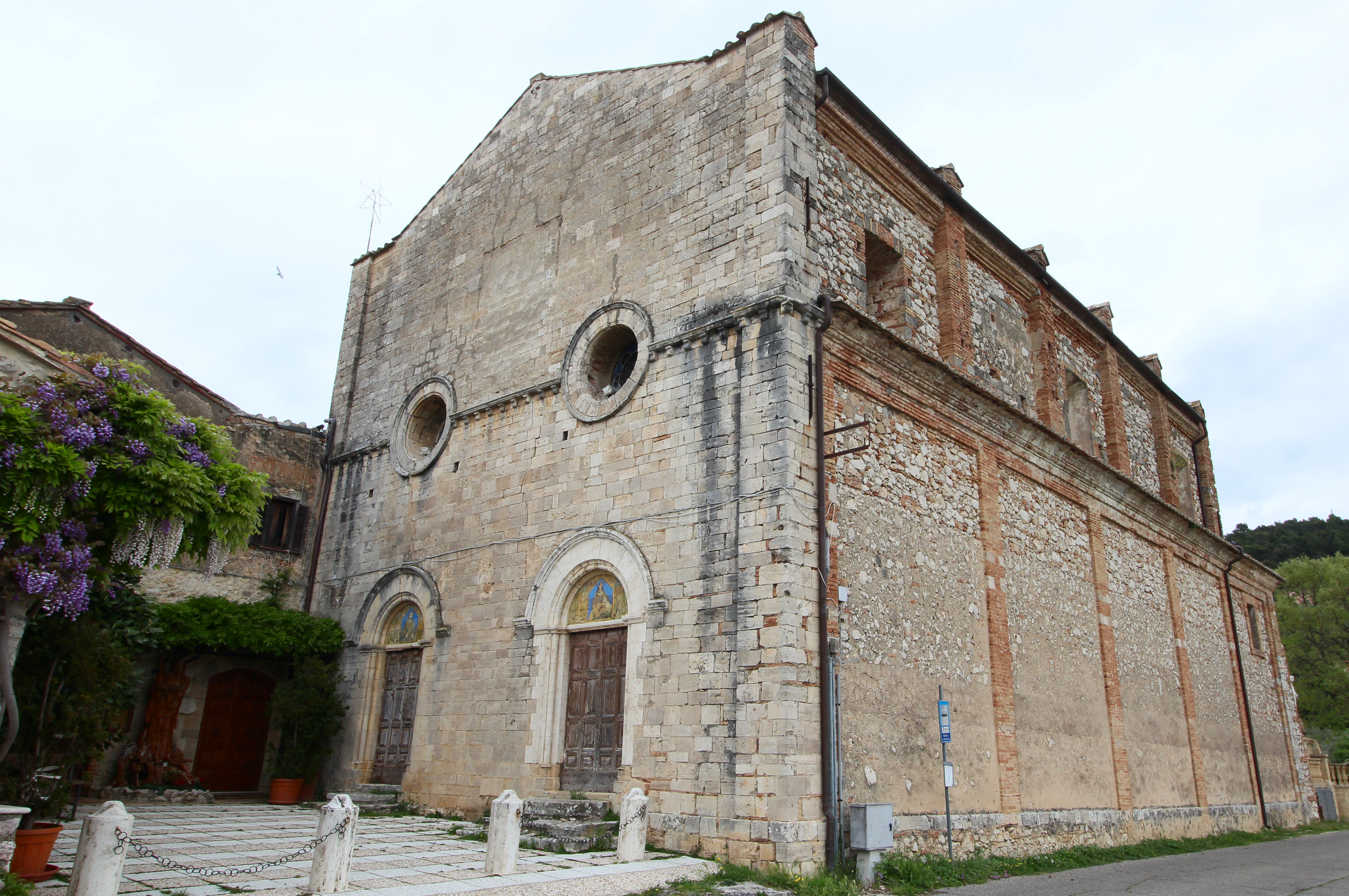
Church of San Francesco

The church of San Francesco and the convent of San Berard stand about 500 metres (1,600 ft) from the walls of Calvi. According to tradition, they were built on land belonging to the family of Saint Berard of Carbio, sent by Saint Francis in 1220 to preach in Morocco, where he was martyred.

Documentary evidence for the original church, first dedicated to Saint Victoria, and for the adjoining small oratory begins in 1291. Of the original architectural complex, the north wall, the church façade, and the small oratory survive. The oratory, consisting of two rooms, one of them raised, was incorporated into the later construction after the fire and sack carried out by the Landsknecht in 1527.

The church, built of local limestone and oriented in the canonical manner, was restored several times during the 17th and 18th centuries. Its façade is square in form and surmounted by a pediment, while the interior consists of a single barrel-vaulted hall with ten side chapels and contains paintings. From the square in front of the church one enters the square cloister, which has at its center a 13th-century well and on its walls remains of frescoes from the second half of the 17th century showing scenes from the life of Saint Francis.

=== Monastery Museum of the Ursulines ===
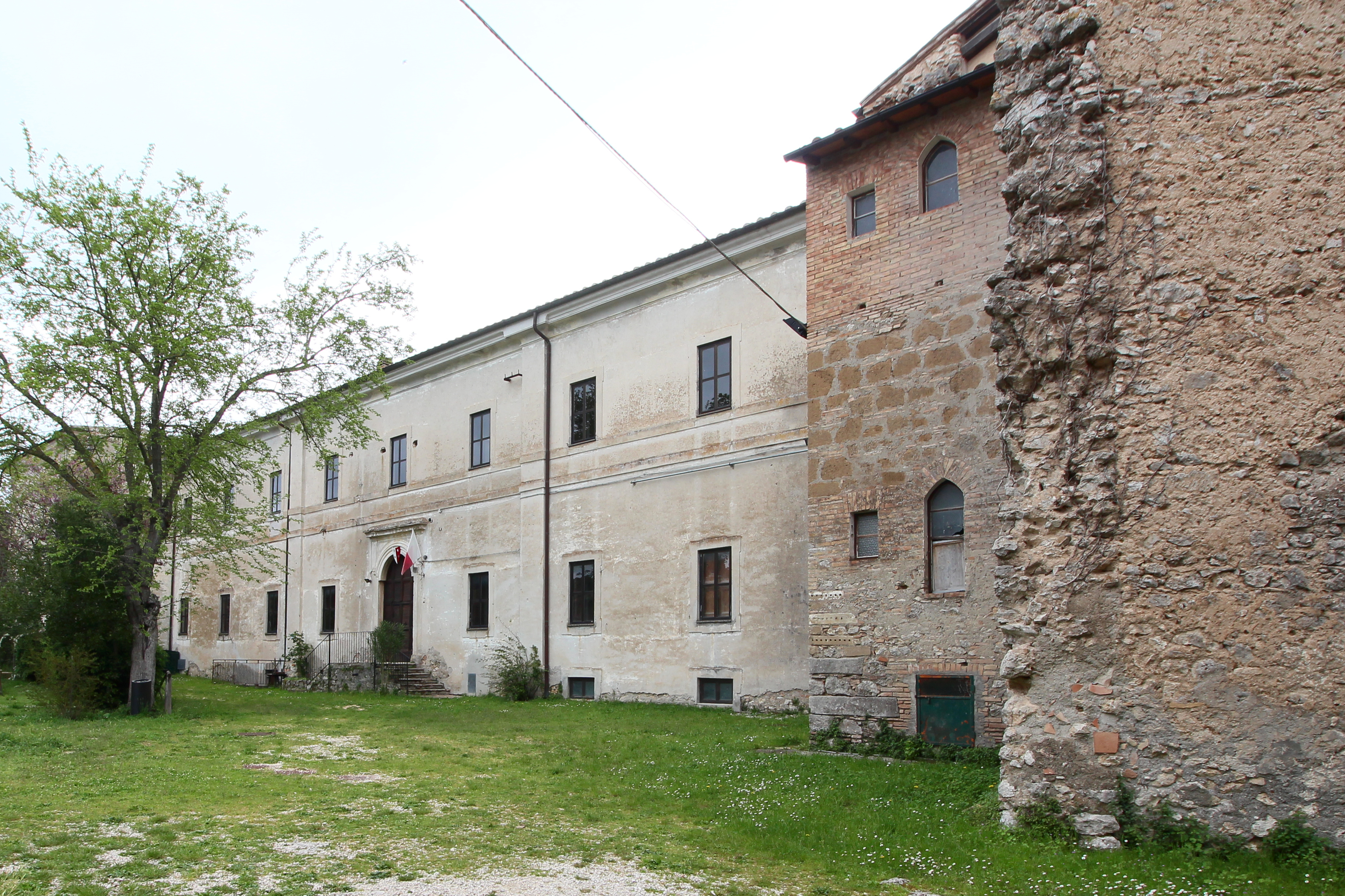
Monastery of the Ursulines

Santa Brigida, a monastery of the Ursulines, founded in 1718 by Demofonte Ferrini for the education of girls, included a church dedicated to Saints Ursula and Angela Merici, as well as a garden and orchard.

The Monastery Museum of the Ursulines is housed in the monastic complex. The building was formed by the incorporation of the 16th-century Palazzo Ferrini with two churches, unified by a monumental façade designed from 1739 by Ferdinando Fuga.

The collection consists of works dating from the 16th to the 18th centuries from post-unification state confiscations and from the monastery itself. The material shows influences from Roman and Abruzzese art, reflecting Calvi's position on the border between Umbria, upper Lazio, and Abruzzo. The historic monastery spaces can also be visited, including the kitchens, washhouse, apothecary, cemetery area, crypt, vegetable garden, and garden.

In 2012 the museum was rearranged to house a donated collection from the Roman Chiomenti-Vassalli family. This collection includes more than 100 paintings and sculptures by Pieter Brueghel the Younger, Guido Reni, Furini, Batoni, Magnasco, Voet, and Petruccio Perugino.

The museum route also includes the church of Sant'Antonio Abate, which houses a monumental nativity scene composed of thirty polychrome terracotta sculptures made in 1546 by Giovanni and Raffaele da Montereale.

=== Sant'Antonio Abate ===
The church of Sant'Antonio contains a large glazed terracotta depicting the Epiphany, dating to the late 16th century, accompanied by additional terracotta statues by the same artist.

The monumental polychrome terracotta nativity scene is placed in the apse basin. It consists of more than thirty statues and was made between 1541 and 1546 by the Abruzzese brothers Giacomo and Raffaele da Montereale. At the sides of the apse basin, in two niches, are statues of Saint Anthony Abbot and Saint Roch, patrons of the confraternity and invoked against plague.

After restoration work, two 16th-century frescoes were also uncovered, one showing Saint Agatha and Saint Blaise and the other Saint Anthony Abbot and Saint Lucy, belonging to the church's original painted decoration.

=== Other religious heritage ===
The Church of San Valentino houses a tempera painting of the Last Supper from the 16th century, of the Roman school.

The patron saint is Saint Pancras, whose feast is celebrated on 12 May with a procession to a hermitage dedicated to him, located about 6 miles (9.7 km) away on a mountain summit.

Other churches include Santa Maria della Neve and Peggiolo in the surrounding area.

== Notable people ==
Among those born in Calvi are Saint Berard of Carbio of the Order of Friars Minor, sent by Saint Francis in 1220 to preach in Morocco, where he was martyred.

Demofonte Ferini is noted for establishing in 1628 a fideicommissum that led to the foundation of the Ursuline monastery.

Calvi was the birthplace of Fra Niccolò de Carbio, a Franciscan who served as confessor to Pope Innocent IV and later became bishop of Assisi.

Prominent families of Calvi in the 19th century included the Marchetti, Venuti, Polelli, Fiorentini, Leonori, Fortini, Trezza, Matticari, and Luchetti. Among them was Gioan Battista Polelli, jurist and philosopher, as well as members of the Leonori family.

== Twin towns ==
- Peiting, Germany
