= Rinaldo di Calvi =

Italian painter (1475–1528)

- Born: 1475; Calvi dell'Umbria
- Died: 1528 (aged 52–53)
- Style: Renaissance

Rinaldo di Calvi was an Italian Renaissance painter.

== Early life ==
Born in Calvi dell'Umbria in 1475, he learned the craft from his father Pancrazio Jacovetti. His father's workshop was active in the region between the regions of northern Lazio and Umbria. His works are influenced by the painter Lo Spagna. Sometime after February 1512, he married Persiana but they did not have any children.

== Works ==
In 1514, he was contracted by the bishop of Narni, Pietro Gormaz, to decorate their family chapel of San Giovenale di Narni. His father had already painted an icon of Madonna della Consolazione at the same church.

Documents show he painted a gonfalone (banner) for the city of Foglia. In 1521, he painted an altarpiece for the chapel of Sant'Antonio di Padova for the Convent of San Bernardo. In 1523, he painted for the church of Santa Maria delle Grazie in Calvi, where he met the painter Benvenuto da Vasciano. He is best known for his large altarpiece of the Coronation of the Virgin for the sacristy of the church of San Nicolo in Stroncone (Terni). He took the contract to paint the altarpiece on 14 July 1521. The altarpiece is considered very similar to the one in Magliano Sabina. Both altarpieces may have been inspired by the 1516 Coronation painted by Vincenzo Tamagni in Arrone, but the most likely source of inspiration was the 1486 Coronation painted by Domenico Ghirlandaio in Narni. Rinaldo's Coronation shows an influence of Raphael, transmitted through his teacher Lo Spagna.

== Later activities ==
The latter works of Rinaldo are well recorded, but most have been lost. These latter works also included pieces of architecture and sculpture. On 2 June 1522, he was hired by the priors of Narni to appraise the valuation of some paintings by Lorenzo Torresani. In 1523, he was hired by the archpriest of Calvi to construct the church of Santa Maria della Sportello, which is no longer extant. In 1524, he also painted a panel of Madonna del Rosario for the church of San Domenico in Narni, but the panel has now been lost. From 1523 to 1524, he also built sculptures with teracotta which have been recorded, but have since been lost.

== Frescoes ==
On 13 March 1525, Rinaldo received payment for the apse frescoes he had painted at the Church of San Antonio Abbate in Civita Castellana. The fresco is divided into three parts by faux pilasters. The center depicts San Antonio on the throne, with Saint Jerome and Saint John the Baptist on his left. On his right are Saint Catherine of Alexandria and Paul of Thebes; in the basin is the Lamentation of Christ; whereas the arch depicts Saint figurines, a Prophet, a Sibyl, and the Eternal Father, all in a tondo.

== Death ==
Rinaldo likely died from the plague circa 1528, most probably before 29 November, the day when the city chancellor noted his death before the city council.
