= Laura M. Calvi =

American neuroendocrinologist and physician-scientist

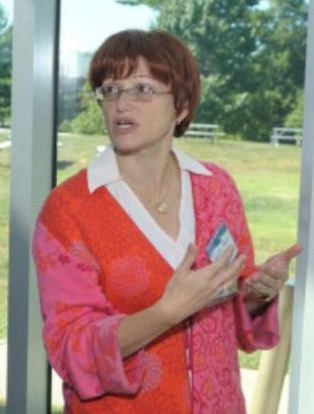
- Calvi in 2010
- Education: Union College; Harvard Medical School
- Scientific career
- Fields: Neuroendocrinology
- Workplaces: University of Rochester Medical Center

Laura Maria Calvi is an American neuroendocrinologist and physician-scientist. She is the SKAWA Foundation Professor in Endocrinology and Metabolism at the University of Rochester. Calvi researches the bone marrow microenvironment and the treatment of patients with pituitary tumors.

== Education ==
Calvi completed an undergraduate degree at Union College. She earned a M.D. from Harvard Medical School and conducted a residency in internal medicine followed by a fellowship in endocrinology at Massachusetts General Hospital. During her fellowship, she trained in neuroendocrinology.

== Career ==
Calvi joined the University of Rochester Medical Center as an assistant professor in the division of endocrinology. She runs a neuroendocrinology clinic with George Edward Vates dedicated to patients with pituitary tumors. Calvi researches the bone marrow microenvironment. In 2020, Calvi appointed as the SKAWA Foundation Professor in Endocrinology and Metabolism. She holds joint appointments in the department of pharmacology and physiology, pathology and laboratory medicine, and the cancer center.
