= Diocese of Teano-Calvi =

Roman Catholic diocese in Italy

Coordinates: 41.2500°N 14.0667°E

Diocese of Teano-Calvi Dioecesis Theanensis-Calvensis

Catholic
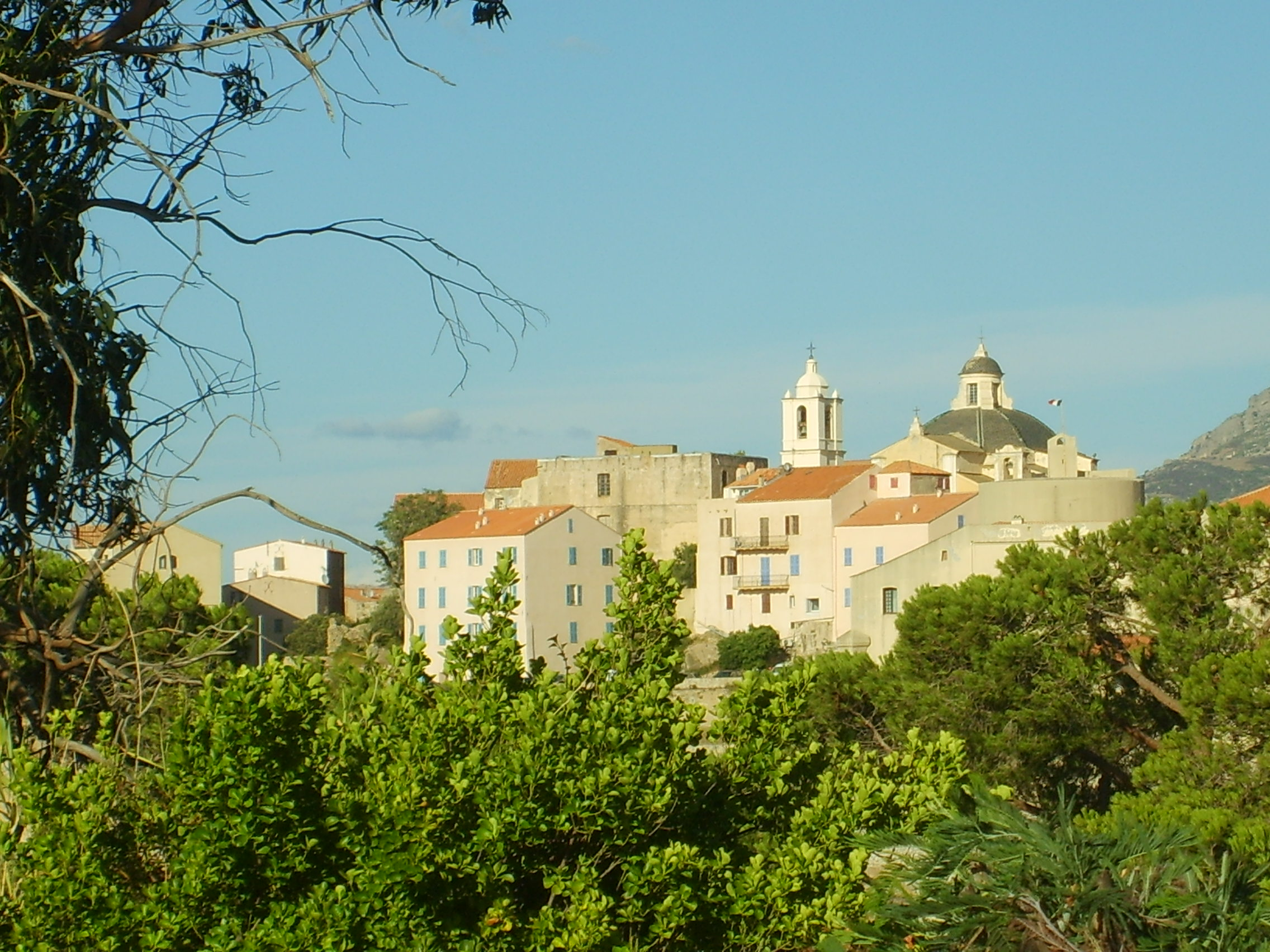
- Co-cathedral of Calvi

Location
- Country: Italy
- Ecclesiastical province: Naples

Statistics
- Area: 663 km^{2} (256 sq mi)
- Population: Total; Catholics: (as of 2016); 84,000 (est.); 82,200 (est.)
- Parishes: 72

Information
- Denomination: Catholic Church
- Rite: Roman Rite
- Established: 5th Century
- Cathedral: Cattedrale di San Giovanni ante Portam Latinam (Teano)
- Co-cathedral: Concattedrale di Santa Maria Assunta (Calvi)
- Secular priests: 60 (diocesan); 18 (Religious Orders); 11 Permanent Deacons

Current leadership
- Pope: Leo XIV
- Bishop: Giacomo Cirulli

Website
- www.diocesiteanocalvi.it

The diocese of Teano-Calvi (Latin: Dioecesis Theanensis-Calvensis) is a Latin diocese of the Catholic Church in Campania, southern Italy, created in 1986. It is a suffragan of the Archdiocese of Naples. The historic Diocese of Teano and diocese of Calvi Risorta were united in 1818, forming the diocese of Calvi e Teano.

== History ==
=== Calvi ===
Calvi is the ancient Cales or Calenum, not far from Capua. Towards the end of the fifth century it was certainly a bishopric, since Valerius, Bishop of Calenum, was present at the Roman Council held by Pope Symmachus in 499. In the first six centuries, only eight names have been recorded, and these only in a list of bishops found in the Breviarium et Martyrologium of the Church of Calvi, a devotional and hagiographic work. There are no names of bishops recorded between 567 and 761 in this list.

Calvi was originally directly dependent upon the Holy See (Papacy), and its bishops attended the Roman synods. But when Pope John XIII fled Rome and took refuge in Capua, he raised the diocese of Capua to metropolitan status, and gave the new archbishop the diocese of Calvi and Teano (among others) as his suffragans (subordinates).

Destroyed in the 9th century by the Saracens, Calvi was rebuilt by Atenulf I of Capua, at which time, probably, the see was re-established. It certainly had a bishop at the end of the eleventh century.

The cathedral of Calvi, dedicated to the taking up of the body of the Virgin Mary into heaven, is administered and served by a corporation called the Chapter, composed of twelve Canons, headed by the Primicerius. There is also a Theologus and a Penitentiarius, in accordance with the decrees of the Council of Trent, who enjoy prebends, but are not considered Canons.

The seminary of Calvi was founded by Bishop Giuseppe del Pozzo (1718–1724), and was blessed by Pope Benedict XIII as he was returning to Rome from Benevento in 1727.

=== Teano ===
The cathedral of Teano is dedicated to S. John the Evangelist and S. Terentianus. There were sixteen Canons in the cathedral Chapter, headed by a Dean. The Canons were once called Cardinals. In 1749, there were two dignities and seventeen Canons. A major fire in the cathedral in the time of Pope Leo X (1513–1521) destroyed nearly all of the archives.

In 1575, the new bishop, Giovanni Paolo Marincola (1575–1588), held a diocesan synod, and ordered the construction of a seminary, in accordance with the decrees of the Council of Trent. But the disorderly life of the bishop postponed work on the work until the administration of Bishop Paolo Squillante in 1654, who had to leave the completion of the work for his successor.

On 29–31 March 1690, Bishop Giuseppe Niccolo Giberti (1681–1697) held a diocesan synod, and had the Constitutions published.

==== Concordat of 1818 ====
Following the extinction of the Napoleonic Kingdom of Italy, the Congress of Vienna authorized the restoration of the Papal States and the Kingdom of Naples. Since the French occupation had seen the abolition of many Church institutions in the Kingdom, as well as the confiscation of most Church property and resources, it was imperative that Pope Pius VII and King Ferdinand IV reach agreement on restoration and restitution. Ferdinand, however, was not prepared to accept the pre-Napoleonic situation, in which Naples was a feudal subject of the papacy. Lengthy, detailed, and acrimonious negotiations ensued.

In 1818, a new concordat with the Kingdom of the Two Sicilies committed the pope to the suppression of more than fifty small dioceses in the kingdom. The ecclesiastical province of Naples was spared from any suppressions, but the province of Capua was affected. Pope Pius VII, in the bull "De Utiliori" of 27 June 1818, chose to unite the two dioceses of Calvi and Teano under the leadership of one bishop, aeque principaliter, that is, one and the same bishop was bishop of both dioceses at the same time. In the same concordat, the King was confirmed in the right to nominate candidates for vacant bishoprics, subject to the approval of the pope. That situation persisted down until the final overthrow of the Bourbon monarchy in 1860.

==== Change of Metropolitan ====
Following the Second Vatican Council, and in accordance with the norms laid out in the Council's decree, Christus Dominus chapter 40, major changes were made in the ecclesiastical administrative structure of southern Italy. Wide consultations had taken place with the bishops and other prelates who would be affected. Action, however, was deferred, first by the death of Pope Paul VI on 6 August 1978, then the death of Pope John Paul I on 28 September 1978, and the election of Pope John Paul II on 16 October 1978. Pope John Paul II issued a decree, "Quamquam Ecclesia," on 30 April 1979, ordering the changes. Three ecclesiastical provinces were abolished entirely: those of Conza, Capua, and Sorrento. A new ecclesiastical province was created, to be called the Regio Campana, whose Metropolitan was the Archbishop of Naples. The dioceses formerly members of the suppressed Province of Capua (Gaeta, Calvi and Teano, Caserta, and Sessa Arunca) became suffragans of Naples.

=== Diocese of Teano-Calvi ===
On 18 February 1984, the Vatican and the Italian State signed a new and revised concordat, which was accompanied in the next year by enabling legislation. According to the agreement, the practice of having one bishop govern two separate dioceses at the same time, aeque personaliter, was abolished. Otherwise Calvi and Teano might have continued to share a bishop. Instead, the Vatican continued consultations which had begun under Pope John XXIII for the merging of small dioceses, especially those with personnel and financial problems, into one combined diocese. On 30 September 1986, Pope John Paul II ordered that the dioceses of Calvi and Teano be merged into one diocese with one bishop, with the Latin title Dioecesis Theanensis-Calvensis. The seat of the diocese was to be in Teano, and the cathedral of Teano was to serve as the cathedral of the merged diocese. The cathedral in Calvi was to become a co-cathedral, and its cathedral Chapter was to be a Capitulum Concathedralis. There was to be only one diocesan Tribunal, in Teano, and likewise one seminary, one College of Consultors, and one Priests' Council. The territory of the new diocese was to include the territory of the former dioceses of Calvi and of Teano.

== Bishops ==
=== Diocese of Calvi Risorta ===
Latin Name: Calvensis
Erected: 5th Century

==== to 1400 ====
...

- Valerius (attested 499)

...
[Rudolfus (761–767)]

- Silvius (died 797)
- Nicetas (797–814)

...
[Passivus (823–827)]
...
[Andreas (attested 853)]
...

- Andreas (attested 966)

...

- Petrus (1041–1044)

...

- Falco (attested 1094)

...
Joannes ? (attested 1126)
...

- Odoardo (Eduardus), O.Cist. (d. 1245)
- Palmerius (?–1253)
- Isembardus (1265–1271)
- Gregorius (1273– ? )
- Landulfus ( ? –1285)
- Robertus (died 1291)
- Henricus (ca. 1291–1301)
- Petrus (ca. 1301–1311)
- Fredericus (1311– )
- Balianus (ca. 1320)
- Joannes (died 1324)

[Petrus, O.Min. (1325–1330)]

- Thaddeus de Capua (13??–1332)
- Joannes de Concivis, O.Min. (1332–ca. 1343)
- Stephanus, O. Carm. (1343–1344)
- Joannes de Arpino, O.Min. (1344–1348)
- Petrus de Brina, O.Min. (1349–1362)
- Rainaldus (1364–1372)
- Joannes de Rocha (1372–1377)
- Robertus de Bacchariis (1377–1395)
- Bartholomaeus, O.E.S.A. (1395–1402) Roman Obedience

==== since 1400 ====
- Stephanus Goberno (1402–1413)
- Antonius Galluzzi (1413–1415)
- Antonius Del Fede, O. Carm. (1415–1443)
- Angelus Mazziotti (ca. 1443–ca. 1466)
- Antonius (1466–1495)
- Maurilio Giannotti (1495–1505)
- Matteo Orsini (bishop) (1505–1512)
- Giovanni Antonio Gallo (9 Aug 1519 – 1543)
- Lorenzo Spada, O.F.M. Conv. (1 Jun 1543 – 1544 Died)
- Berenguer Gombau (27 Oct 1544 – 1551 Died)
- Gaspare Ricciullo del Fosso, O.Min. (22 Apr 1551 – 17 Jul 1560 Appointed, Archbishop of Reggio Calabria)
- Giulio Magnani, O.F.M. Conv. (17 Jul 1560 – 1566 Died)
- Paolo Terracino (10 Jun 1566 – 1575 Died)
- Ascanio Marchesini (23 Sep 1575 – 1580 Died)
- Scipione Bozzuti (24 Feb 1580 –1582)
- Fabio Maranta (5 Mar 1582 – 1619)
- Gregorio Del Bufalo (8 Apr 1619 – 1623)
- Gennaro Filomarino, C.R. (18 Dec 1623 – Oct 1650)
- Francesco Maria Falcucci (19 Dec 1650 – 1661)
- Vincenzo Carafa, C.R.L. (8 Aug 1661 – 1679)
- Vincenzo Maria da Silva, O.P. (1679–1702)
- Giovanbattista Caracciolo, C.R.S. (15 Jan 1703 – 5 Nov 1714)
- Filippo Positano (16 Dec 1720 – Dec 1732)
- Gennaro Maria Danza (2 Mar 1733 – 1740)
- Giuseppe Barone (29 May 1741 – 12 Jan 1742 Died)
- Francesco Agnello Fragianni (28 Feb 1742 – Apr 1756 Died)
- Giuseppe Maria Capece Zurlo, C.R. (24 May 1756 –1782)
- Andrea de Lucia (27 Feb 1792 – 1830 Died)

=== Diocese of Teano ===
==== to 1300 ====
Paris (c. 314–346)
Amasius (c. 346–355)
Urbanus

- Quintus (c. 499)

...

- Domninus (ca. 555–560)

...
Maurus ? ( ? )

...

- Lupus, O.S.B. (d. 860)
- Hilarius, O.S.B. (860–after 867)
- Stephanus (attested in 868)
- Leo (879, 887/888)
- Angelarius, O.S.B. (ca. 886–889)

...

- Landus (attested 987)

...

- Sandarius (c. 1004–1009)

...

- Isambardus (attested 1050)
- Arduinus (attested 1059)

...

- Pandulfus, O.S.B. (attested 1122)
- Petrus (ca. 1171–1192)
- Theodinus (1193–1227)
- Roffredus (attested 1229–1239)
- Hugo
- Guilelmus
- Nicolaus

==== since 1300 ====
- Adenulfus (c. 1305)
- Giffredus de Gallutio
- Petrus
- Homodeus
- Bartholomaeus (1348–1353)
- Marinus de Judice (1353–1361)
- Joannes Mutio (1361–1363)
- Francesco de Messana, O.P. (1363–1369)
- Thomas de Porta (1369–1382)
- Alexander
- Antonius (attested 1383–1393) Roman Obedience
- Joannes de Ebulo ( –1388) Avignon Obedience
- Nicolaus Diano (1393–1412) Roman Obedience

Gasparus de Diano (1412–1418)

- Joannes Crispani (1418–1443)
- Martinus Pales de Belinzo (1443–1458)
- Cardinal Nicolaus Fortiguerra (1458–1473)
- Orso Orsini (1474–1495)
- Francisco de Borja (1495–1508)
- Francisco Borja (1508–1531)

[Cardinal Giovanni Salviati (1531–1535)] Administrator

- Antonio Maria Sartori (1535–1556)
- Hieronymus Nichesola, O.P. (1557–1566)
- Cardinal Archangelo Bianchi, O.P. (1566–1575)
- Giovanni Paolo Marincola (1575–1588)
- Vincenzo Brancaleone (1588)
- Vincenzo Serafini (1588–1616)
- Angelo della Ciaia (1616)
- Michael Saragoza de Heredia (1617–1622)
- Ovidio Lupari (1623–1627)
- Giovanni de Guevara, C.R. (1627–1642)
- Muzio delle Rose (1642–1654)
- Paolo Squillante (1654–1660)
- Ottavio Boldoni, Barnabite (1661–1680)
- Giuseppe Niccolo Giberti (1681–1697)
- Domenico Pacifico (1698–1717)
- Giuseppe de Puteo (del Pozzo) (1718–1724)
- Dominico Cirillo (1724–1746) (transferred to Carinola)
- Angelo Longo, O.S.B. (1746–1749)
- Dominico Giordani (1749–1755) (transferred to Nicomedia)
- Aniello Broya (1755–1767)
- Giovanni Jacopo Onorati (1768–1777)
- Filippo Aprile (1777–1792) (transferred to Melfi)
- Rafael Pasca, O.S.B. (1792–1797)
- Nicola Vecchi (1797–8 January 1808)

=== Diocese of Calvi e Teano ===
United: 27 June 1818 with Diocese of Teano

- Andrea de Lucia (1818–1830)
- Giuseppe Maria Pezzella, O.S.A. (1830 – 3 Jan 1833)
- Giuseppe Trama (20 Jan 1834 Confirmed – 6 Oct 1837 Resigned)
- Nicola Sterlini (1840–1860)
- Bartolomeo D’Avanzo (13 Jul 1860 – 20 Oct 1884)
- Alfonso Maria Giordano, C.SS.R. (20 Oct 1884 – 16 Dec 1907 Resigned)
- Albino Pella (19 Aug 1908 – 12 Apr 1915 Appointed, Bishop of Casale Monferrato)
- Calogero Licata (14 Apr 1916 – 25 Aug 1924)
- Giuseppe Marcozzi (14 Aug 1926 – 21 Apr 1940)
- Giacinto Tamburini (6 Mar 1941 – 8 Jan 1944)
- Vincenzo Bonaventura Medori (17 Jul 1945 – 12 Aug 1950)
- Giacomo Palombella (3 Jan 1951 – 2 Jul 1954 Appointed, Archbishop of Matera)
- Matteo Guido Sperandeo (5 Sep 1954 – 17 Aug 1984 Retired)
- Felice Cece (17 Aug 1984 – 8 Feb 1989 Appointed, Archbishop of Sorrento-Castellammare di Stabia)

=== Diocese of Teano-Calvi ===
Latin Name: Theanensis-Calvensis
Name Changed: 30 September 1986

- Felice Cece (17 Aug 1984 – 8 Feb 1989 Appointed, Archbishop of Sorrento-Castellammare di Stabia)
- Francesco Tommasiello (15 Jul 1989 – 25 Oct 2005 Died)
- Arturo Aiello (13 May 2006 – 5 May 2017)
- Giacomo Cirulli (14 Sep 2017 – )

== Books ==
=== Reference works ===
- Gams, Pius Bonifatius (1873). Series episcoporum Ecclesiae catholicae: quotquot innotuerunt a beato Petro apostolo. Ratisbon: Typis et Sumptibus Georgii Josephi Manz. p. 864-865 (Calvi); 930-931 (Teano).
- Eubel, Conradus, ed. (1913). Hierarchia catholica, Tomus 1 (second ed.). Münster: Libreria Regensbergiana. p. 159 (Calvi); 480-481 (Teano). (in Latin)
- Eubel, Conradus, ed. (1914). Hierarchia catholica, Tomus 2 (second ed.). Münster: Libreria Regensbergiana. p. 243. (in Latin)
- Gulik, Guilelmus (1923). Eubel, Conradus (ed.). Hierarchia catholica, Tomus 3 (second ed.). Münster: Libreria Regensbergiana. p. 305. (in Latin)
- Gauchat, Patritius (Patrice) (1935). Hierarchia catholica IV (1592-1667). Münster: Libraria Regensbergiana. p. 324. (in Latin)
- Ritzler, Remigius; Sefrin, Pirminus (1952). Hierarchia catholica medii et recentis aevi V (1667-1730). Patavii: Messagero di S. Antonio. pp. 137–138 (Calvi); 373 (Teano).
- Ritzler, Remigius; Sefrin, Pirminus (1958). Hierarchia catholica medii et recentis aevi VI (1730-1799). Patavii: Messagero di S. Antonio. p. 399 (Teano).
- Ritzler, Remigius; Sefrin, Pirminus (1968). Hierarchia Catholica medii et recentioris aevi (in Latin). Vol. VII (1800–1846). Monasterii: Libreria Regensburgiana.
- Remigius Ritzler; Pirminus Sefrin (1978). Hierarchia catholica Medii et recentioris aevi (in Latin). Vol. VIII (1846–1903). Il Messaggero di S. Antonio.
- Pięta, Zenon (2002). Hierarchia catholica medii et recentioris aevi (in Latin). Vol. IX (1903–1922). Padua: Messagero di San Antonio. ISBN 978-88-250-1000-8.

=== Studies ===
- Broccoli, Michele (1822). Teano Sidicino, antico, e moderno (in Italian). Vol. Parte III. Napoli: Presso P. Tizzano.
- Cappelletti, Giuseppe (1866). Le chiese d'Italia della loro origine sino ai nostri giorni (in Italian). Vol. vigesimo (20). Venezia: Giuseppe Antonelli. pp. 182–213.
- D'Avino, Vincenzo (1848). Cenni storici sulle chiese arcivescovili, vescovili, e prelatizie (nullius) del Regno delle Due Sicilie (in Italian). dalle stampe di Ranucci. pp. 660-662.
- Lanzoni, Francesco (1927). Le diocesi d'Italia dalle origini al principio del secolo VII (an. 604). Faenza: F. Lega. (in Italian)
- Ricca, A. (1835). Osservazioni del barone A. Ricca sull'antica Calvi di D. Mattia Zona (in Italian). Vol. Parte seconda. Napoli: dalla stamperia de' fratelli Reale.
- Ughelli, Ferdinando; Coleti, Niccolo (1720). Italia Sacra Sive De Episcopis Italiae (in Latin). Vol. Tomus sextus (6). Venezia: Coleti. pp. 477–483 (Calvi), 196–215 (Teano).
- Ughelli, Ferdinando (1722). Italia sacra (in Latin). Vol. Tomus decimus. Venezia: apud Sebastianum Coleti. pp. 231–251.
