= Calvi Risorta =

- Comune
- Comune di Calvi Risorta
- Location within Italy Location within Campania
- Coordinates: 41°11′N 14°3′E
- Country: Italy
- Region: Campania
- Province: Caserta (CE)
- Frazioni: Calvi Vecchia, Petrulo, Visciano, Zuni

Government
  - Mayor: Giovanni Lombardi

Area
  - Total: 15.96 km^{2} (6.16 sq mi)
- Elevation: 114 m (374 ft)

Population (31 March 2017)
  - Total: 5,652
  - Density: 354.1/km^{2} (917.2/sq mi)
- Demonym: Caleni
- Time zone: UTC+1 (CET)
  - Summer (DST): UTC+2 (CEST)
- Postal code: 81042
- Dialing code: 0823
- Patron saint: St. Castus
- Website: Official website

See Calvi for namesakes

Calvi Risorta is a comune (municipality) and former bishopric in the Province of Caserta in the Italian region Campania, located across the Via Casilina about 40 kilometres (25 mi) northwest of Naples and about 25 kilometres (16 mi) northwest of Caserta.

It is composed of three distinct villages, Petrulo, Visciano and Zuni, the latter housing the municipal seat.

== History ==
In the municipal territory are the remains of the ancient Roman city of Cales or Calenum, not far from Capua.

Destroyed in the 9th century by the Saracens, it was rebuilt by Atenulf I of Capua.

During the early stages of the Italian Campaign of World War II, war pigeon G.I. Joe saved the lives of the inhabitants of the village and of the British troops occupying it. The village was scheduled to be bombarded by the Allied forces on 18 October 1943, but the message that the British had captured the village, delivered by G.I. Joe, arrived just in time to avoid the bombing. Over a thousand people, soldiers and civilians, were saved.

== Twin towns ==
- Forino, Italy

== See also ==
- Cales
- List of Catholic dioceses in Italy
