= Raffaele Castielli =

- Church: Roman Catholic Church
- See: Diocese of Lucera-Troia
- In office: 1987–1996
- Predecessor: Carmelo Cassati (Lucera), Salvatore De Giorgi (Troia)
- Successor: Francesco Zerrillo

Orders
- Ordination: July 9, 1950

Personal details
- Born: 5 March 1927; Faeto, Italy
- Died: 3 August 2018 (aged 91); Lucera, Italy

Raffaele Castielli (5 March 1927 – 3 August 2018) was an Italian bishop, ordinary of the Roman Catholic Diocese of Lucera-Troia. He was ordained a priest on July 9, 1950. He was appointed first bishop of the newly merged Diocese of Lucera-Troia on February 11, 1987, receiving his episcopal consecration on March 25, 1989 from Archbishop Salvatore De Giorgi. Castielli retired as bishop on May 18, 1996.
