= Giambattista Eustachio =

Italian Roman Catholic prelate

Most Reverend Giambattista Eustachio
- Bishop of Lucera
- Church: Catholic Church
- Diocese: Diocese of Lucera
- In office: 1663–1687
- Predecessor: Silvestro D'Afflitto
- Successor: Domenico Morelli (bishop)

Orders
- Consecration: 18 February 1663 by Benedetto Odescalchi

Personal details
- Born: 1622 Troia, Italy
- Died: September 1687 (age 65) Lucera, Italy

Giambattista Eustachio (1622–1687) was a Roman Catholic prelate who served as Bishop of Lucera (1663–1687).

== Biography ==
Giambattista Eustachio was born in Troia, Italy in 1622. On 12 February 1663, he was appointed Bishop of Lucera by Pope Alexander VII. On 18 February 1663, he was consecrated bishop by Benedetto Odescalchi, Cardinal-Priest of Sant'Onofrio. He served as Bishop of Lucera until his death in September 1687.

While bishop, he was the principal co-consecrator of Ulysses Rossi, Auxiliary Bishop of Sabina and Titular Archbishop of Salamis (1681).

== External links and additional sources ==
- Cheney, David M. "Diocese of Lucera-Troia". Catholic-Hierarchy.org. (for Chronology of Bishops) ^{[self-published]}
- Chow, Gabriel. "Diocese of Lucera-Troi (Italy)". GCatholic.org. (for Chronology of Bishops) ^{[self-published]}

Catholic Church titles
Preceded by Silvestro D'Afflitto	Bishop of Lucera; 1663–1687	Succeeded by Domenico Morelli (bishop)
