= Michelino =

Italian singer (1937–2010)

- Born: Michele Gramazio; 1937; Lucera, Foggia, Italy
- Died: 27 December 2010 (aged 72–73); Como, Italy
- Occupations: Singer, actor

Michelino, stage name of Michele Gramazio (1937 – 27 December 2010) was an Italian singer.

Michele Gramazio stage named "Michelino" was born in Lucera, Italy in 1937 but in the 1940s Gramazio moved to Rome. He was amongst the first Italian artists to adopt Latin American music styles, he was considered the Italian father of the cha-cha-cha, mainly thanks to the success of the song "Cha cha cha della segretaria", a cover of Pepe Luis' "Cha cha cha de las segretarias", which ranked at the sixth place on the Italian hit parade. Michelino was also well known for the song "La pachanga", which charted #9 on the hit parade.
