= Lucera Cathedral =

Cathedral in Lucera, Italy

Coordinates: 41°30′29″N 15°20′06″E

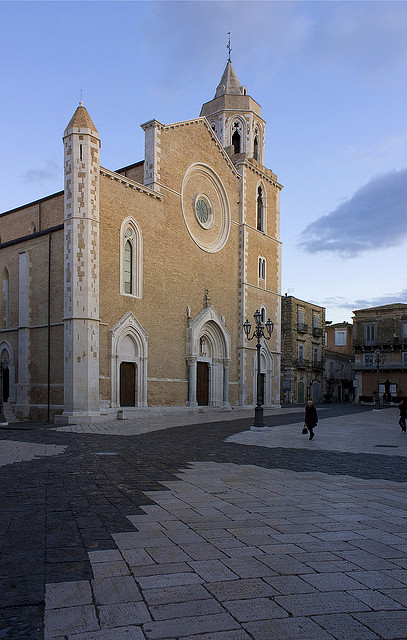
Lucera Cathedral

Lucera Cathedral (Italian: Duomo di Lucera; Basilica cattedrale di Santa Maria Assunta di Lucera; also popularly Santa Maria della Vittoria) is the cathedral of Lucera, Apulia, Italy. The dedication is to the Assumption of the Virgin Mary but it is also popularly known as Santa Maria della Vittoria from the statue of the Madonna kept here. It is the seat of the Bishop of Lucera-Troia (previously of the Bishops of Lucera), and is also a minor basilica. In its present form it originates mostly from the 14th century. It is one of the very few buildings in Apulia in which the Gothic architectural style of the medieval French rulers appears almost unaltered.

== Site and dedication ==
The church is located in the historical town centre of Lucera, on the Piazza del Duomo. The dedication, to the Assumption of the Blessed Virgin Mary, refers to a small gilded wooden statue of the Virgin of the late 14th century, which has the nickname Madonna della vittoria ("Madonna of Victory"), because it is said to commemorate the victory of the Anjou dynasty over the Hohenstaufen in Southern Italy.

== Foundation and construction history ==
The present church stands on the site of an older one, that in the time of Emperor Frederick II was turned into a mosque for the use of the Saracens from Sicily who had been resettled in the nearby Lucera Castle and retained their Islamic belief, from whom Frederick formed his bodyguard.

After the massacre or enslavement of most of the Saracens in 1300 under Charles II of Naples the mosque was destroyed. Charles ordered a new church (the present cathedral) to be built on the site, probably under the supervision of the master builder Pierre d'Agincourt. Construction was completed by 1317. It is the southernmost Gothic brick church in continental Italy and one of the few examples of Gotico Angioino style outside the city of Naples.

In the 16th and 17th centuries the church interior was refurbished according to the taste of the Baroque. In the 19th century these alterations were to some extent undone. Pope Gregory XVI elevated the church to the rank of a basilica minor in 1834.

== West front ==
The asymmetrical west front is in three parts. The left and central parts date from the 14th century. Both are very plain. Above the side portal on the left the wall is broken only by a simple window with a pointed arch, while in the centre over the main portal is a single round window, which - unusually for an important Apulian church - has not been elaborated into a rose window. The right-hand part of the west front, constructed later, is formed by a tower of generally Romanesque appearance, even though it is more recent than the Gothic portions . The octagonal cupola is of the 16th century. Despite the overall simplicity of the west front, the figure carvings on the portals are well-executed in their detail.

== Interior and furnishings ==
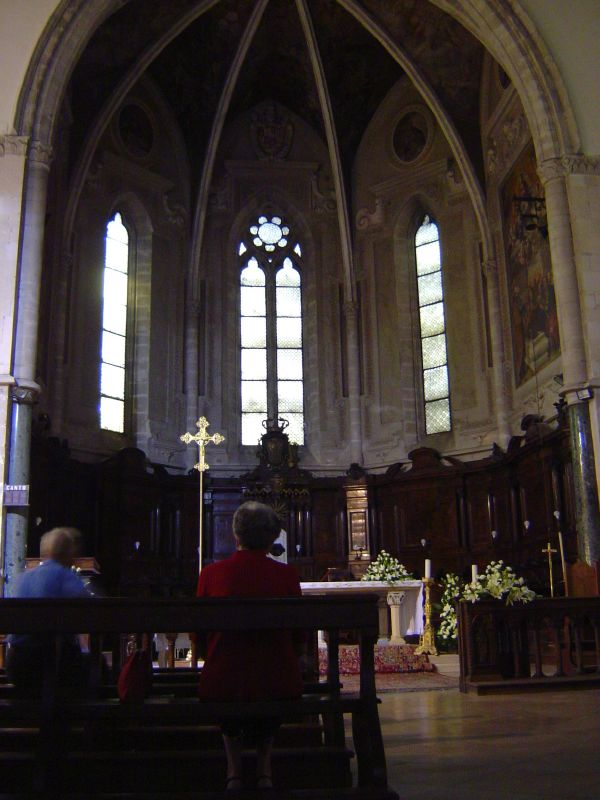
Altar

The cathedral interior is that of a basilica heavily influenced by the style of French Gothic cathedrals, as exemplified by the three aisles set in a church of cruciform groundplan.

French influence is clearly seen in the arcades of pointed arches of the wide central aisle and the pillars which support them. The half-columns in front of them are of considerably greater age. The high walls of the nave are pierced only by very small lancet windows.

The transept is of notable depth, while the choir also has lancet windows. The east end of the cathedral terminates in three apses.

The statue of the Madonna della Vittoria is on the altar in the left arm of the transept. The 15th-century frescoes in the left-hand apse are of particular note, while the right-hand apse contains a crucifix from the Rhineland of about 1340 as well as the gravestone of a French knight, also from the 14th century. The pulpit dates from 1560.

The stone table, supported by octagonal columns with various capitals, which now forms the high altar is of particular historical interest in that it was originally a table in Castel Fiorentino, where Emperor Frederick II died in 1250.

== See also ==
- Gotico Angioino

== Sources ==
- Braunfels, Wolfgang (1984): Kleine italienische Kunstgeschichte. DuMont Buchverlag, Köln ISBN 3-7701-1509-0.
- Horst, Eberhard (1975): Friedrich II. - Der Staufer - Kaiser - Feldherr - Dichter; Wilhelm Heyne Verlag, München ISBN 3-453-55043-9.
- Pace, Valentino (1994): Kunstdenkmäler in Süditalien – Apulien, Basilicata, Kalabrien; Wiss. Buchges., Darmstadt ISBN 3-534-08443-8
- Rotter, Ekkehart (2000): Apulien – byzantinische Grottenkirchen, normannische Kathedralen, staufische Kastelle und Lecceser Barock; DuMont-Reiseverlag, Ostfildern ISBN 3-7701-4314-0
- Tavernier, Ludwig (1987): Apulien; Artemis-Verlag, München ISBN 3-7608-0792-5
- Willemsen, Carl Arnold (1973): Apulien – Kathedralen und Kastelle (2nd edn); DuMont Schauberg, Köln ISBN 3-7701-0581-8
