= Troia Cathedral =

Cathedral in Apulia, Italy

Coordinates: 41°21′39″N 15°18′31″E

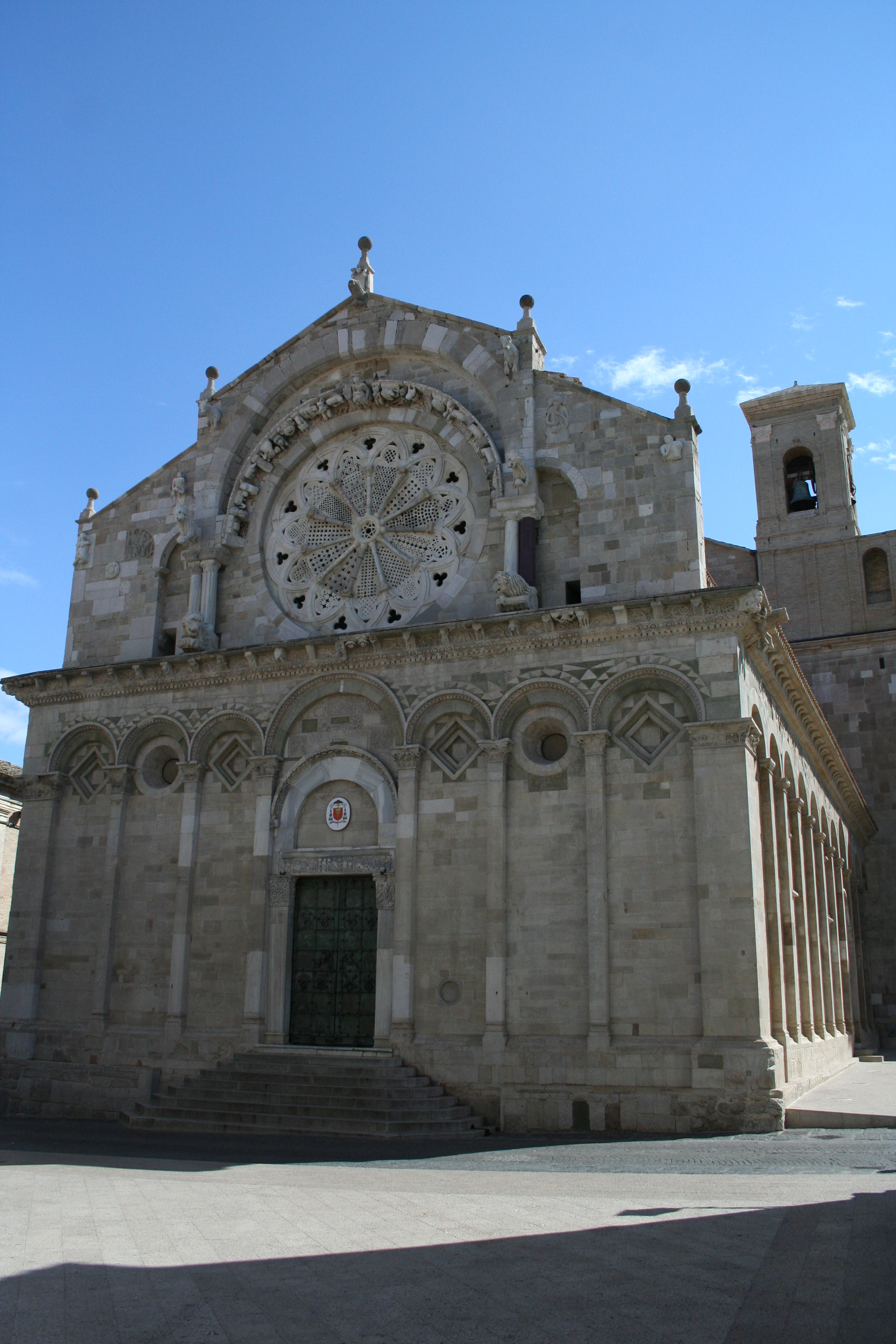
West front with the famous rose window

Troia Cathedral (Italian: Concattedrale di Troia; Cattedrale di Santa Maria Assunta) is the cathedral of Troia in Apulia, Italy, dedicated to the Assumption of the Blessed Virgin Mary. Built in the first quarter of the 12th century, it is reckoned a masterpiece of Apulian Romanesque architecture and is particularly noted for the rose window and the bronze doors of the west front. Formerly the seat of the Bishops of Troia, it is now a co-cathedral in the diocese of Lucera-Troia.

== Location and dedication ==
The church is located in the centre of Troia on the Via Regina Margherita. The principal façade, orientated to the north-west, looks onto a small forecourt. The dedication to the Assumption of the Virgin Mary was taken over from the predecessor building, which has been partly incorporated into the present structure.

The following Latin inscription is located on a wall of the Chapel of the Patron Saints: Felix antistes dom(i)nus Guillelmus secundus fecit hanc aede(m) D(e)o ac beatae Mariae vobisq(ue) fidelibus felices troiani

== History ==
A Byzantine church formerly stood on the site, apparently constructed largely from the remains of Roman buildings. Work on a new cathedral began in the last quarter of the 11th century. The year 1073 is often given but the exact date of the start of construction is in fact unconfirmed. Excavations in the 1950s were at one time believed to have established that the present transept was originally the nave of the previous church building, but this is now contested. It is however certain that the cores of the two western pillars of the crossing date from the very first building phase, and possibly served the same purpose in the original church.

The church received its present groundplan however in the first quarter of the 12th century through the substantial enlargements of Bishop William II of Troia, who from 1093 had the present nave built. The construction of the present apse may well also date from this period. An inscription on the bronze doors of the main portal indicates that this was finished in 1119, by which time the construction of the nave was clearly more or less completed. In 1107 work began on the lower part of the west front. Further works, particularly on the upper part of the west front, took place in the 13th century. The sacristy and the two arms of the transept received their present form in the 17th and 18th centuries; the eastern arm of the transept still contains older material in its external walls. The present bell tower also stands in part on walls of the 11th century.

== West front and rose window ==
=== West front ===
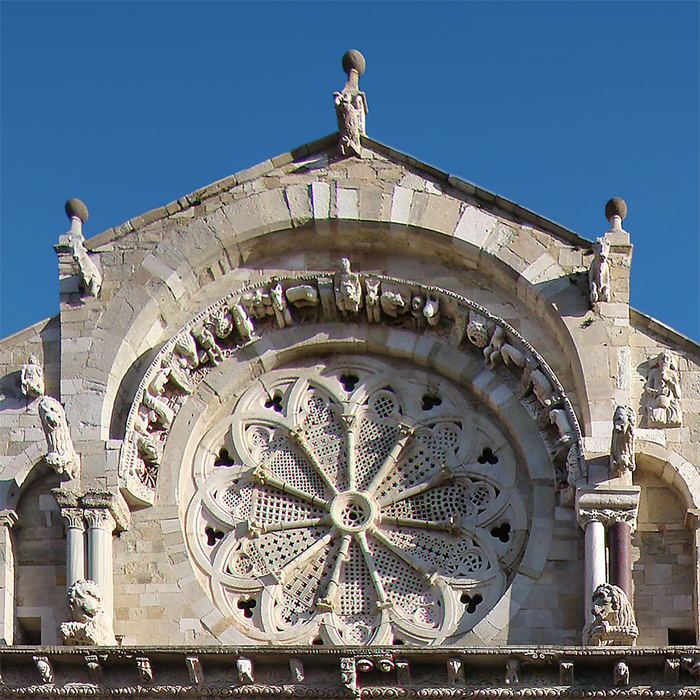
Rose window, c. 1160-1180

The west front of the cathedral is richly decorated. The lower part was built as part of Bishop William's works that took place between 1107 and 1120; the upper part was redesigned about 100 years later., but was overhauled, while retaining the older work, from 1229.

The lower part of the west front is 19 metres wide and divided into seven parts. To left and right of the main portal are three blind arches, supported by pilasters with varying forms of capital. The central blind arches on both sides each contain a round window, while the flanking arches are worked in a lozenge pattern. Like the external parts of the nave, which also follow this basic structure, they are very finely worked in a variety of building stones. The construction of the church exterior is thus held to be unusually ornate for Apulia.

The main portal itself is outlined by a simple archivolt. In the architrave is a relief showing Christ in the centre accompanied by Mary to the left and Saint Peter to the right. Beyond them on either side are two of the symbols of the Evangelists, and on the outside the patron saints of the town, Saints Eleutherius and Secundinus. Along the lower edge of the relief is the Latin inscription Istius ecclesiae per portam materialis introitus nobis tribuatur spiritualis ("Through the door of this material church may there be granted to us the entry to the spiritual").

The upper part of the west front, up as far as the top of the rose window, dates from the period up to about 1180, while the point of the gable and its outermost surfaces are from the alterations at the beginning of the 13th century.

=== Rose window ===
The rose window is famous as one of the most beautiful in Apulia. It consists of eleven slender columns assembled in a wheel, the spaces between them filled with decorative carved stone grilles (transenne), a very rare form of the rose window. Each transenna is differently worked, and some have an Oriental effect. The surround consists of overlapping arches, with the interstices pierced by trefoils. Also remarkable are the carvings of the inner of the two arches overhanging the window, consisting of a multiplicity of animals and human forms, among them a boy relieving himself. These arches are supported by double columns on the backs of lions.

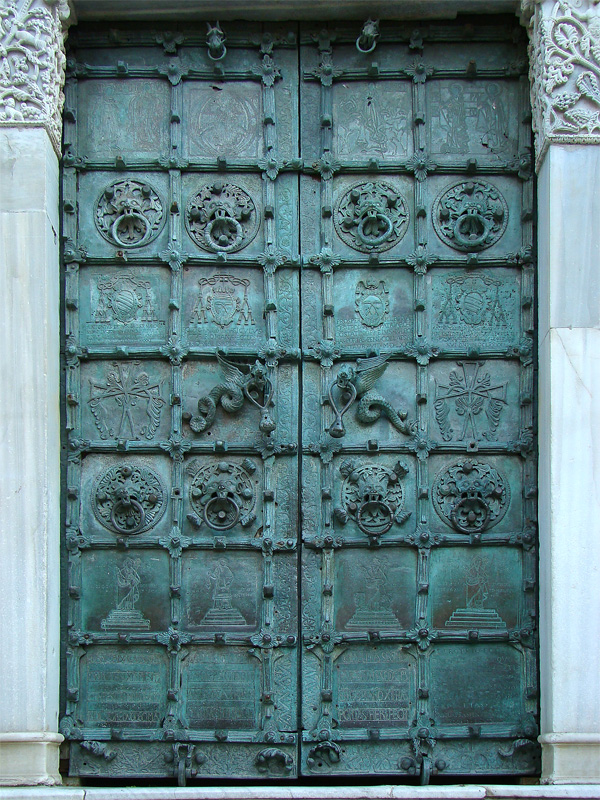
The bronze doors of the main portal, completed 1119

== Bronze doors ==
=== Main portal ===
The famous doors of the main portal were made by one of the most celebrated bronze-casters of the 12th century, Oderisio of Benevento; according to the inscription, they were finished in 1119. They contain 28 panels in niello work. The door knockers in the mouths of lions and the small figures of winged dragons, representing fear and desire are the originals, little masterpieces of medieval sculpture. Many of the panels were replaced during the 16th and 17th centuries, but the four along the top row are still the originals. They depict, from left to right: the artist, Oderisio; Christ in Judgment; Count Berard of Sangro; and Bishop William II. The inscription on the four panels below reads as follows:

(1) An[n]o ab incarnatio[n]e/d[omi]ni n[o]stri Ie[s]v Xr[ist]i mil[e]simo/centisimo nondecimo/indictione dvodecima
(2) Anno pontificat[us] d[omi]ni/Kalisti P[a]p[e] secvndi p[rimo]/ann[o] dvcat[us] W[ilelmi] Rocerii/clo[rio]si dvcis filii nono
(3) Willelmvs secvnd[us]/hui[us] Troiane sedis ep[i]s[copus]/erat svi an[no] XII has/portas fieri fecit
(4) DE PROPRIO ECCLESIAE AERARIO IPSAMQUE FABRICAM A FUNDAMENTIS FERE EXIT

(The fourth panel and its text were restored in the 16th century, as a note on the plate indicates.)

This translates as:

(1) - In the 1119th year from the incarnation of Our Lord Jesus Christ and in the twelfth indiction /
(2) - In the first year of the pontificate of the Lord Pope Callixtus II / and the ninth year of the rule of Duke William son of Roger the Glorious /
(3) - William the Second, who was bishop of the See of Troia, in his twelfth year caused these doors to be made /
(4) - From his own wealth for the church and the fabric of the same to be raised almost from the foundations.

On the capital of the left-hand column are carved a ram, a goat, a dog and a damned soul. On the capital of the right column are carved the Tree of Life, ripe fruits, and a blessed soul.

These doors served as models for those of the cathedrals of Foggia and of Termoli.

=== South portal ===
Also by Oderisio of Benevento is the door in the portal on the south side of the cathedral. The inscription begins in the uppermost panel with the opening words: Princeps patronv[m]/Petre Troia[m] suvspice/donv[m], qua[m] leta/bvndvs Gvilelm[us]/dono svndvs, which records the gift by Duke William of the city of Troia to the Apostle Peter. Next to it is a depiction of the bishop next to the town, between Saints Peter and Paul. The next eight panels contain representations of the previous eight bishops, who have been strikingly individualised. The row below contains more door knockers in the mouths of lions, beneath which follow a further eight panels with a long inscription, recording that the people of Troia, in order to recover their freedom after the death of Duke William, destroyed the castle and fortified the town with a wall and a ditch, in the time of Bishop William, who describes himself as the guardian of justice and the liberator of his country.

This door is noticeably simpler in style than the doors of the main portal.

== Sides and apse ==
The north and south exterior walls display a continuous series of blind arcades supported on pilasters and containing rectangular windows alternating with round-arched windows and blank spaces. The north side has better-developed capitals on the pilasters, however, and the blind arcades are sometimes decorated with reliefs.

The tympanum over the portal on the north side contains a relief of Christ between two angels, over a richly decorated architrave. The style of the relief points to Byzantine influences.

The exterior of the apse is of particular interest. It is semi-circular and consists of unusually deep blind arcades constructed out of conjoined pillars. The capitals and bases are extremely richly carved with human figures, animal figures and foliage. The apse window is supported by figures of lions. It is supposed that the pillars and capitals were pieces of booty taken by Robert Guiscard from Bari and presented to Troia in 1073.

== Interior ==
The church is built on a Latin cross plan and contains a central nave, the height of which is perhaps the most striking feature of the interior, and two side-aisles separated by two round-arched arcades of 6 marble columns each. The forms of the capitals vary, but most are of the Corinthian Order. The first column to the west is a double column, the only one in the building, thus making a total of 13 columns. There is no ceiling, leaving the construction of the roof above the massive corbels open to view. The nave is not precisely symmetrical: at the crossing the central axis deviates a few degrees to the north, as can be seen by the difference in the distances between the north and south columns at the crossing.

The pulpit is located between the fifth and sixth columns on the north side. It is supported by small columns with strongly worked capitals of the Corinthian order. It dates from the Norman-Staufer period of Apulia, and is reckoned as one of the masterpieces of the period. It originally stood in the Basilica of San Basilio in Troia and was not moved to the cathedral until 1860. According to the inscription that runs round it, it was built in 1169. At the front, supported on a single small column, is a lectern on the back of a Staufer eagle, which is striking at a hare. On the left side is a relief showing a lion attacking a sheep while itself being attacked by a dog, an ancient Oriental motif. The disparity of the various elements strongly suggests that the pulpit was assembled from already existing parts that were to hand.

The cathedral treasury contains some important medieval artworks, among them three Exultet rolls as well as equipment and robes for the Mass.

== Sources ==
- Belli d'Elia, Pina, and others (1980): La Puglia fra bisanzo e l'occidente. Milan: Electa Editrice, Gruppo Editoriale Electa
- Belli D’Elia, Pina (1987): "S. Maria Assunta a Troia", in La Puglia [Italia Romanica, 8], pp. 405–430. Milan
- Belli D'Elia, Pina (1990): "Le porte della cattedrale di Troia", in Le porte di bronzo dall'antichità al secolo XIII (S. Salomi, ed.), pp. 341–355. Rome
- De Santis, M. (1958): L'anima eroica della Cattedrale di Troia. Foggia
- Legler, Rolf (1987): Apulien: 7000 Jahre Geschichte und Kunst im Land der Kathedralen, Kastelle und Trulli. Cologne: DuMont Verlag ISBN 3-7701-1986-X
- Pace, Valentino (1994): Kunstdenkmäler in Süditalien – Apulien, Basilicata, Kalabrien; Darmstadt: Wiss. Buchges. ISBN 3-534-08443-8
- Pace, Valentino (2001): "Palinsesto troiano. Peccato giudizio e condanna sulla facciata di una cattedrale pugliese", in Opere e giorni. Studi su mille anni di arte europea dedicati a Max Seidel (K. Bergdolt e G. Bonsanti, ed.), pp. 67–72. Venice
- Rotter, Ekkehart (2000): Apulien – byzantinische Grottenkirchen, normannische Kathedralen, staufische Kastelle und Lecceser Barock. Ostfildern: DuMont-Reiseverlag ISBN 3-7701-4314-0
- Tavernier, Ludwig (1987): Apulien. Munich: Artemis-Verlag ISBN 3-7608-0792-5
- Willemsen, C. A. (1973): Apulien – Kathedralen und Kastelle (2nd edn). Cologne: DuMont Schauberg ISBN 3-7701-0581-8
