= Giuseppe Giuliano =

Italian Roman Catholic bishop (born 1951)

His Excellency Giuseppe Giuliano
- Bishop Emeritus of Lucera-Troia
- Church: Catholic Church
- Diocese: Lucera-Troia
- Appointed: 20 October 2016
- Installed: 27 December 2016
- Term ended: 9 October 2026
- Predecessor: Domenico Cornacchia
- Successor: Giorgio Ferretti

Orders
- Ordination: 16 May 1982 by Guerino Grimaldi
- Consecration: 27 December 2016 by Beniamino Depalma

Personal details
- Born: 28 June 1951 (age 75) Naples, Italy
- Education: Pontifical Gregorian University
- Motto: In amicitia Jesu Christi
- Coat of arms

Giuseppe Giuliano (born 28 June 1951) is an Italian Roman Catholic prelate who served as the bishop of Lucera-Troia from 2016 until 2026. He was appointed to the diocese by Pope Francis on 20 October 2016 and received episcopal consecration on 27 December 2016. His resignation from the pastoral governance of the diocese was accepted by Pope Leo XIV on 9 October 2026.

== Early life and education ==
Giuseppe Giuliano was born in Naples, Italy, on 28 June 1951. He grew up in Somma Vesuviana, in the metropolitan area of Naples, and attended classical secondary school in Ottaviano. He subsequently began studying medicine before deciding to pursue the priesthood.

In 1976, he entered the Almo Collegio Capranica in Rome and studied philosophy and theology at the Pontifical Gregorian University. He obtained a licentiate in moral theology in 1983.

== Priesthood ==
Giuliano was ordained a priest for the Diocese of Nola on 16 May 1982 by Bishop Guerino Grimaldi.

Following his ordination, he served as private secretary to Bishop Giuseppe Costanzo from 1983 to 1987. From 1983 to 1988, he was diocesan assistant for the youth sector of Catholic Action, diocesan youth-pastoral officer, and a canon of the cathedral chapter. He directed the Higher Institute of Religious Sciences G. Duns Scoto in Nola from 1984 to 1988 and again from 1992 to 2000.

From 1987 to 1994, he served as rector of the diocesan seminary and director of the diocesan vocation centre. He was also diocesan assistant for Catholic Action and the Ecclesial Movement for Cultural Commitment between 1988 and 1996, and national assistant of Catholic Action for Children from 1996 to 2002.

From 2002 to 2010, Giuliano directed the diocesan catechetical office. He was appointed parish priest of San Giorgio Martire in Somma Vesuviana in 2003, where he began his pastoral ministry in July of that year. He also served as a spiritual assistant to Catholic doctors in the diocese and taught fundamental moral theology at the Higher Institute of Religious Sciences in Nola. In 2000, he was named a Chaplain of His Holiness.

Giuliano also wrote articles on moral theology and published devotional books and collections of homilies.

== Episcopate ==
=== Bishop of Lucera-Troia ===
On 20 October 2016, Pope Francis appointed Giuliano bishop of the Diocese of Lucera-Troia in Apulia, southern Italy. At the time of his appointment, he was a priest of the Diocese of Nola, parish priest in Somma Vesuviana, and lecturer in moral theology.

He received episcopal consecration on 27 December 2016 at the Cathedral of Nola and took possession of the Diocese of Lucera-Troia on 4 February 2017.

During his episcopate, Giuliano was involved in diocesan pastoral and cultural initiatives. One such initiative was the establishment of the Scuola delle Cattedrali (School of Cathedrals), a project associated with the cathedral heritage and cultural life of the diocese.

=== Resignation ===
On 9 October 2026, Pope Leo XIV accepted Giuliano's resignation from the pastoral governance of the Diocese of Lucera-Troia. On the same day, the pope appointed Archbishop Giorgio Ferretti, metropolitan archbishop of Foggia-Bovino, as bishop of Lucera-Troia, uniting the two dioceses in persona episcopi.

Catholic Church titles
Preceded by Domenico Cornacchia	Bishop of Lucera-Troia; 2016–2026	Succeeded by Giorgio Ferretti
