= Giuseppe Rocco Favale =

Italian Roman Catholic bishop (1935–2018)

- Bishop of Vallo della Lucania
- Church: Catholic Church
- Diocese: Diocese of Vallo della Lucania
- In office: 4 March 1989 – 7 May 2011
- Predecessor: Giuseppe Casale
- Successor: Ciro Miniero

Orders
- Ordination: 15 July 1962
- Consecration: 1 May 1989 by Michele Giordano

Personal details
- Born: 11 July 1935 Irsina, Province of Matera, Kingdom of Italy
- Died: 29 June 2018 (aged 82) Gravina in Puglia, Bari, Italy

Giuseppe Rocco Favale (11 July 1935 – 29 June 2018) was an Italian Roman Catholic bishop.

Favale was born in Irsina, Italy and was ordained to the priesthood in 1962. He served as bishop of the Roman Catholic Diocese of Vallo della Lucania, Italy, from 1989 to 2011.
