= Gotico Angioino =

Gothic style of architecture

The Gotico Angioino is a Gothic style of architecture found in southern Italy. It is named after the Capetian House of Anjou and had been the style of the Kingdom of Sicily since 1266 and the Kingdom of Naples since 1302. It must not be confused with the Angevin Gothic of western France. The Capetian House of Anjou began with Charles I of Anjou, who had been given the County of Anjou in apanage by his brother, Louis IX of France. He was given the kingdom of Sicily as a fief by Pope Clement IV, as the popes wanted to finish the Hohenstaufen rule in Italy and to cut the junctions between the Holy Roman Empire and Sicily. Establishing his rule in Naples, he brought a large staff of courtiers and specialists along with himself.

Therefore, the architectural style developed under his rule, was a combination of influences from the Crown land of France around Paris and Italian traditions.

Among the examples of this style are Lucera Cathedral in Apulia and the church Santa Maria a Marciano in the commune of Piana di Monte Verna in Campania. Naples has numerous churches built in the Gothic Angioino style. One of them, San Lorenzo Maggiore consists of a choir and ambulatory with ribbed vaults in "Parisian" Gothic style, and transept and nave with pointed arches but open sight into the woodwork of the roof, as it is frequent in Italian architecture.

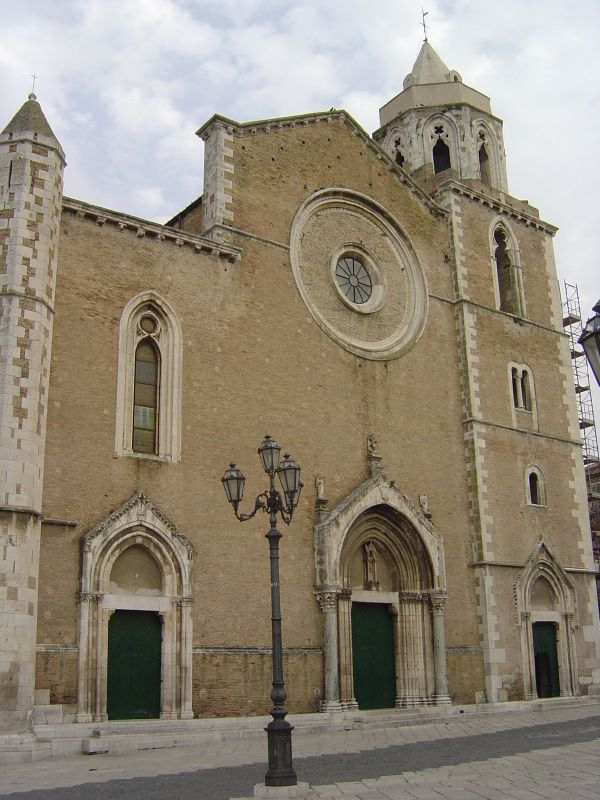
Lucera Cathedral, the southernmost Gothic brick church of continental Italy

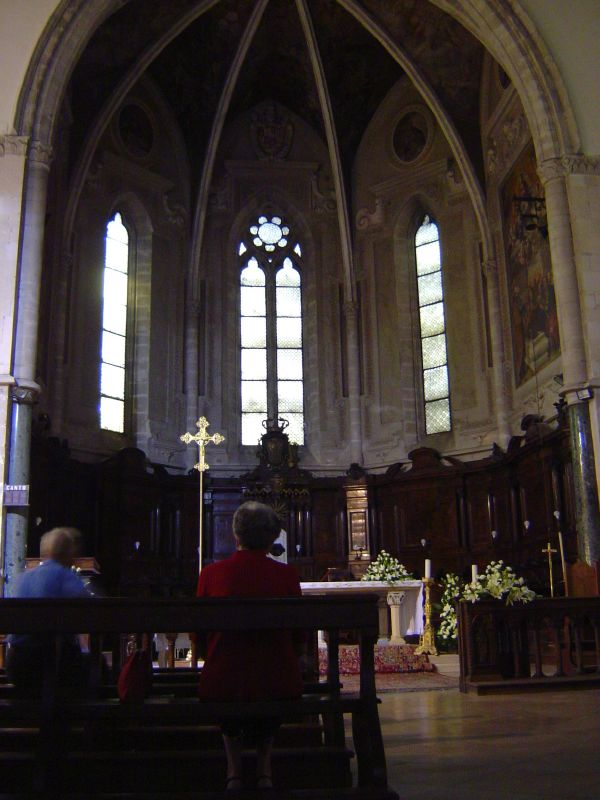
Lucera Cathedral, apse with an umbrella vault

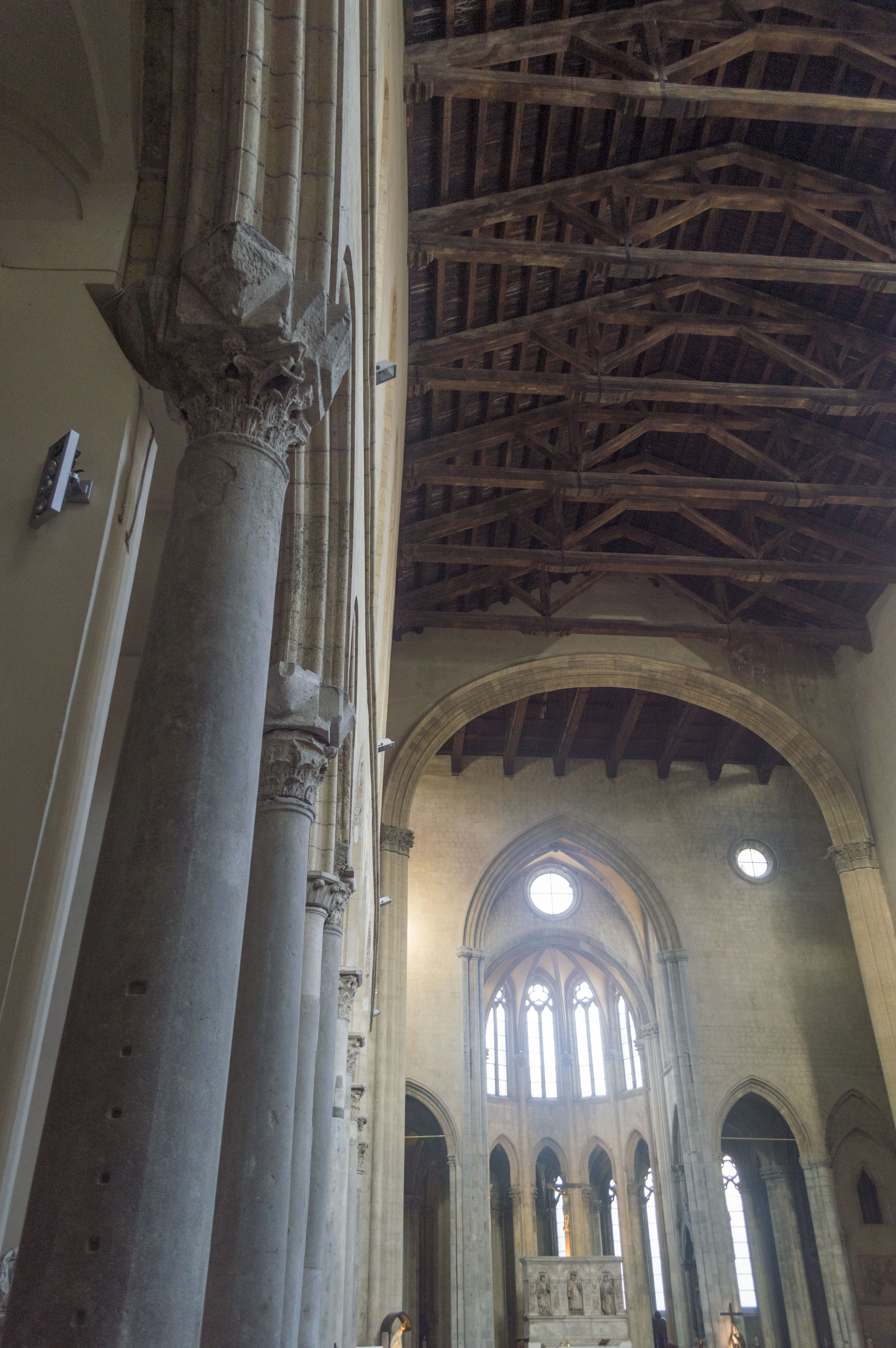
San Lorenzo Maggiore in Naples, nave open to the woodwork of the roof

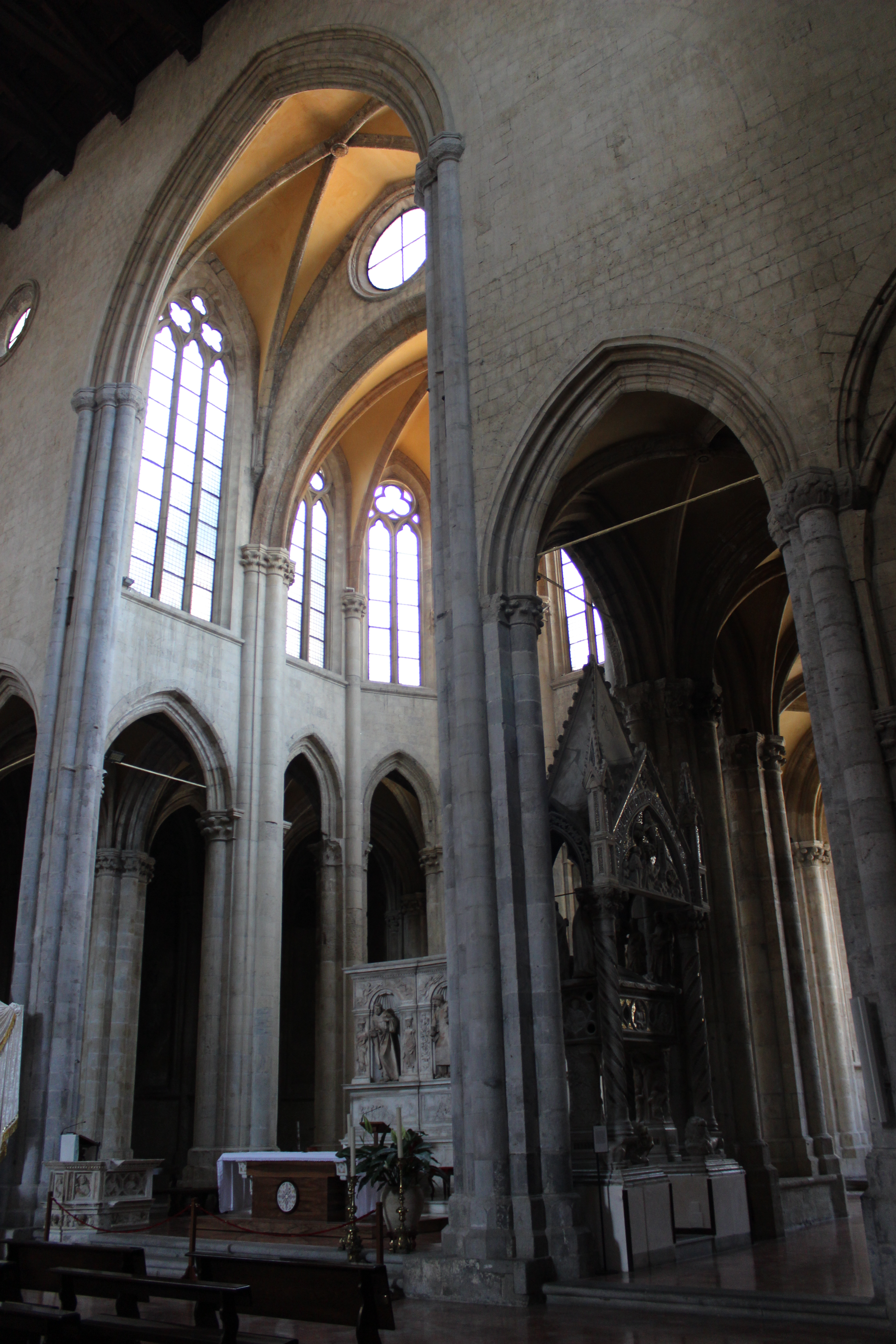
San Lorenzo Maggiore, ambulatory and choir with rib vaults

== See also ==
- List of architectural styles

== Extern sources ==
- Treccani (a serious Italian encyclopedy) : Description of the adjective "angioino" and its application on Gothic style (in Italian)
- Historia Regni: Il gotico alla corte angioina di Napoli (in Italian)
- Puglia.com, Cattedrale di Lucera, duomo dedicato a Santa Maria Assunta – description of this building as an example of "stile gotico-angioino" (in Italian)
