= Domenico Morelli (bishop) =

Most Reverend Domenico Morelli
- Bishop of Lucera
- Church: Catholic Church
- Diocese: Diocese of Lucera
- In office: 1688–1716
- Predecessor: Giambattista Eustachio
- Successor: Domenico Maria de Liguori

Orders
- Ordination: 4 April 1665
- Consecration: 23 May 1688 by Marcantonio Barbarigo

Personal details
- Born: 29 March 1642 Foggia, Italy
- Died: 1716 (age 73) Lucera, Italy

Domenico Morelli (1642–1716) was a Roman Catholic prelate who served as Bishop of Lucera (1688–1716).

== Biography ==
Domenico Morelli was born in Foggia, Italy on 29 March 1642 and ordained a priest on 4 April 1665. On 17 May 1688, he was appointed during the papacy of Pope Innocent XI as Bishop of Lucera. On 23 May 1688, he was consecrated bishop by Marcantonio Barbarigo, Bishop of Corneto e Montefiascone, with Pietro de Torres, Archbishop of Dubrovnik, and Costanzo Zani, Bishop of Imola, serving as co-consecrators. He served as Bishop of Lucera until his death in 1716.

== External links and additional sources ==
- Cheney, David M. "Diocese of Lucera-Troia". Catholic-Hierarchy.org. (for Chronology of Bishops) ^{[self-published]}
- Chow, Gabriel. "Diocese of Lucera-Troi (Italy)". GCatholic.org. (for Chronology of Bishops) ^{[self-published]}

Catholic Church titles
Preceded by Giambattista Eustachio	Bishop of Lucera; 1688–1716	Succeeded by Domenico Maria de Liguori
