= Giuseppe Casale =

Italian prelate of Roman Catholic Church (1923–2023)

His Excellency Giuseppe Casale
- Archbishop Emeritus of Foggia-Bovino
- See: Foggia-Bovino
- Appointed: 7 May 1988
- Term ended: 27 May 1999
- Predecessor: Salvatore De Giorgi
- Successor: Domenico Umberto D’Ambrosio
- Previous post: Bishop of Vallo della Lucania (1974–1988)

Orders
- Ordination: 3 February 1946
- Consecration: 8 December 1974 by Sebastiano Baggio

Personal details
- Born: 28 September 1923 Trani, Italy
- Died: 18 May 2023 (aged 99)

Giuseppe Casale (28 September 1923 – 18 May 2023) was an Italian historian and prelate of the Catholic Church.

== Biography ==
Casale was born in Trani, Italy and was ordained a priest on 3 February 1946. He studied theology and history and was a professor of Church History and Italian History from 1949 to 1953 at the Catholic colleges of Trani and Molfetta. After this, he was publishing pastoral magazines. He was appointed bishop to the Roman Catholic Diocese of Vallo della Lucania on 26 October 1974 and ordained bishop on 8 December 1974. He was appointed Archbishop of the Archdiocese of Foggia-Bovino on 7 May 1988 and remained in that post until his retirement on 27 May 1999.

As a bishop, he spoke often on controversial political and theological issues and gained a reputation as left-wing and progressive. He advocated the possibility for women to become Catholic cardinals, and suggested that the Catholic Church should not oppose state legislation on same-sex marriage and consider in the future giving “a blessing from the Lord” to same-sex couples. He had also served as president of CESNUR ("Center for Studies on New Religions"). In 1993, he published a pastoral letter, New Religiosity and New Evangelization, where he challenged the prevailing Catholic attitude on new religious movements, suggesting that the Catholic Church should not limit itself to criticism, but reflect on why the new movements are successful, and open a cautious dialogue with some of these groups.

Casale died on 18 May 2023, at the age of 99.

Catholic Church titles
Preceded by Salvatore De Giorgi	Archbishop of Foggia-Bovino; 1988–1999	Succeeded by Domenico Umberto D’Ambrosio
Preceded by Biagio d'Agostino	Bishop of Vallo della Lucania; 1974–1988	Succeeded by Giuseppe Rocco Favale
