= Francesco Zerrillo =

Italian priest and theologian (1931–2022)

The Most Reverend Francesco Zerrillo
- Bishop of Lucera–Troia
- Diocese: Lucera–Troia
- Appointed: 15 February 1997
- Term ended: 30 June 2007
- Predecessor: Raffaele Castielli
- Successor: Domenico Cornacchia
- Previous post: Bishop of Tricarico (1985–1997)

Orders
- Ordination: 25 July 1954
- Consecration: 25 Jan 1986 by Bernardin Gantin

Personal details
- Born: 23 April 1931 Reino, Campania, Italy
- Died: 14 May 2022 (aged 91) Reino, Campania, Italy
- Motto: BENIGNITAS ET HUMANITAS
- Coat of arms

Styles of Francesco Zerrllo
- Reference style: His Excellency; The Most Reverend
- Spoken style: Your Excellency
- Religious style: Bishop

Francesco Zerrllo (23 April 1931 – 14 May 2022) was an Italian Roman Catholic prelate.

Zerrillo was born in Italy and was ordained to the priesthood in 1954. He served as bishop of the Roman Catholic Diocese of Tricarico, Italy from 1986 to 1997 and served as bishop of the Roman Catholic Diocese of Lucera-Troia, Italy, from 1997 until his retirement in 2007.

Catholic Church titles
| Preceded by Raffaele Castielli | Bishop of Lucera–Troia; 1997–2007 | Succeeded by Domenico Cornacchia |
| Preceded by Carmelo Cassati | Bishop of Tricarico; 1985–1997 | Succeeded by Salvatore Ligorio |
