= Francesco Pio Tamburrino =

Francesco Pio Tamburrino OSB
- Archbishop Emeritus of Foggia–Bovino
- Church: Catholic Church
- Archdiocese: Archdiocese of Foggia–Bovino
- In office: 2 August 2003 – 11 October 2014
- Predecessor: Domenico Umberto D'Ambrosio
- Successor: Vincenzo Pelvi
- Previous posts: Secretary of the Congregation for Divine Worship and the Discipline of the Sacraments (1999-2003); Bishop of Teggiano-Policastro (1998-1999); Abbot of Montevergine (1990-1998)

Orders
- Ordination: 29 August 1965 by Girolamo Bortignon
- Consecration: 25 March 1998 by Michele Giordano

Personal details
- Born: 6 January 1939 (age 87) Oppido Lucano, Province of Potenza, Kingdom of Italy

Styles of Francesco Pio Tamburrino
- Reference style: Archbishop
- Spoken style: Your Excellency
- Religious style: His Excellency

Francesco Pio Tamburrino (born 6 January 1939 in Oppido Lucano) was the Roman Catholic Archbishop of the Archdiocese of Foggia-Bovino from 2003 to 2014. He was Vice President of the Episcopal Conference of Puglia, Italy.

He moved with his family as a child in Cesano Maderno, and at 11 he entered the Benedictine Abbey of Praglia, where he attended the gymnasium. He attended High School in Parma, Italy, and then the two years of philosophy at the Abbey of Pia. He graduated in Theology from the Pontifical Athenaeum of St Anselm in Rome. On 11 October 1955 he made monastic profession in the Order of St. Benedict. On 29 August 1965 he was ordained a priest of the Order of St. Benedict and on 29 November 1989 he was appointed Abbot of the Territorial Abbey of Montevergine.

On 14 February 1998, he was appointed Bishop of the Diocese of Teggiano-Policastro. He was consecrated on 25 March 1998, by Cardinal Michele Giordano, Archbishop of Naples, assisted principally by Archbishops Gerardo Pierro and Serafino Sprovieri.

On 27 April 1999 he was assigned to the Roman Curia as secretary of the Congregation for Divine Worship and the Discipline of the Sacraments.

His final appointment, on August 2, 2003 was as Metropolitan Archbishop of Foggia – Bovino (Italy), a post from which he retired on October 11, 2014.

== Service ==
- Abbot of the Territorial Abbey of Montevergine (Italy) (November 29, 1989 – February 14, 1998)
- Bishop of Teggiano–Policastro (Italy) (February 14, 1998 – April 27, 1999)
- Secretary of the Congregation for Divine Worship and the Discipline of the Sacraments (April 27, 1999 – August 2, 2003)
- Metropolitan Archbishop of Foggia – Bovino (Italy) (August 2, 2003 – October 11, 2014)
