= Diocese of Lucera–Troia =

Roman Catholic diocese in Italy

Diocese of Lucera–Troia Dioecesis Lucerina-Troiana

Catholic
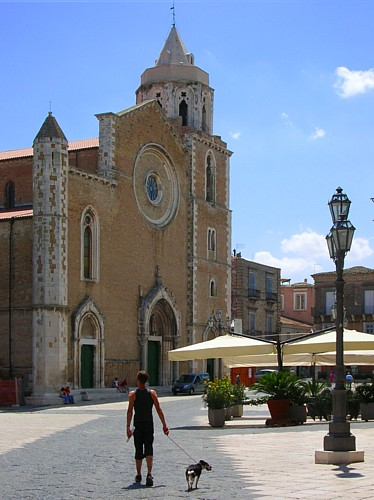
- Lucera Cathedral

Location
- Country: Italy
- Ecclesiastical province: Foggia-Bovino

Statistics
- Area: 1,337 km^{2} (516 sq mi)
- Population: Total; Catholics: (as of 2023); 61,044 ▼; 50,628 ▼ (82.9 ▼%)
- Parishes: 33

Information
- Denomination: Catholic Church
- Rite: Roman Rite
- Established: 4th century 1986 (merger)
- Cathedral: Lucera Cathedral
- Co-cathedral: Troia Cathedral
- Secular priests: 44 (diocesan) ▼20 (Religious Orders) ▲5 Permanent Deacons

Current leadership
- Pope: Leo XIV
- Bishop: Giorgio Ferretti
- Bishops emeritus: Giuseppe Giuliano

Website
- www.diocesiluceratroia.it

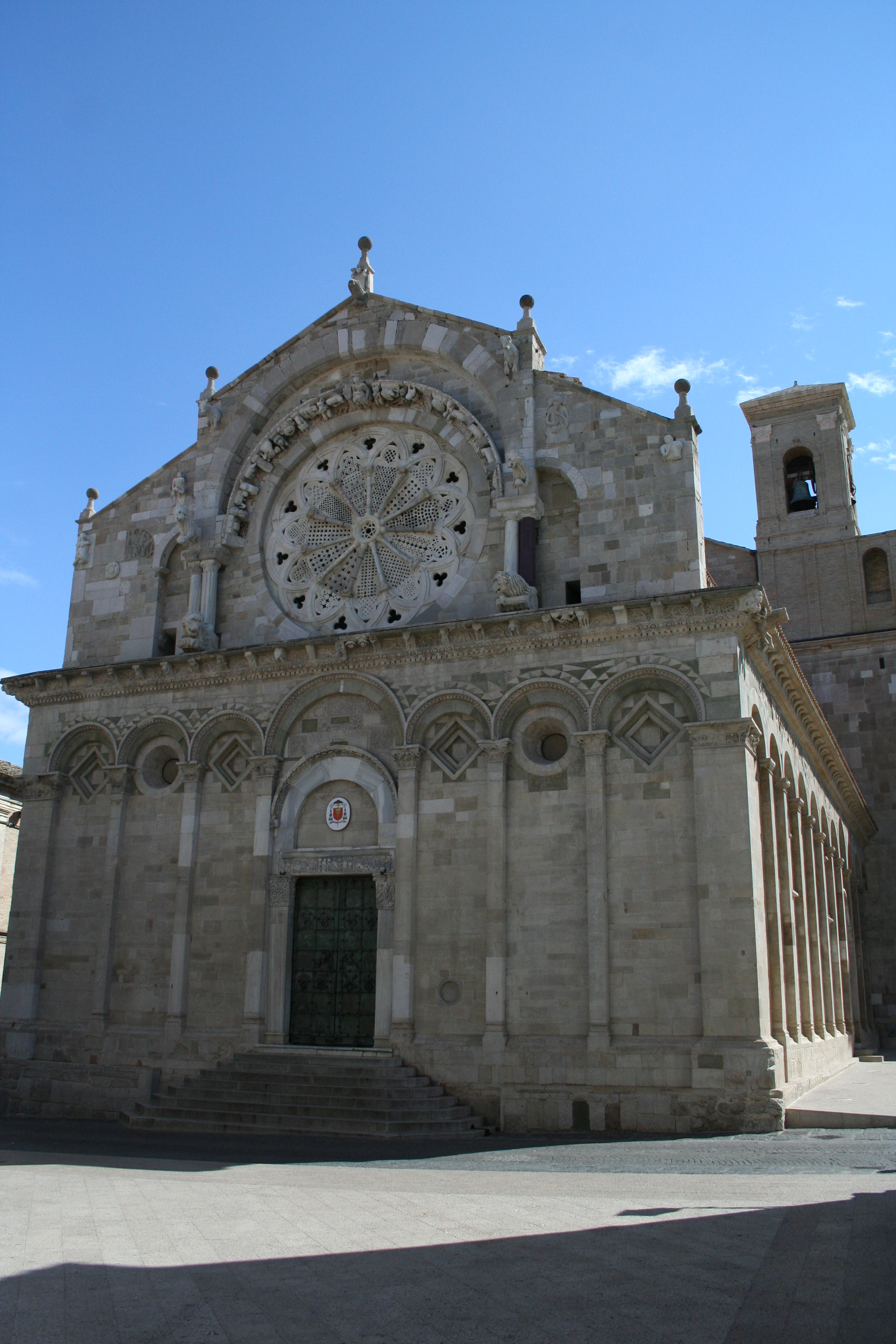
Co-cathedral in Troia

The Diocese of Lucera-Troia (Latin: Dioecesis Lucerina-Troiana), sometimes called Nocera, is a Latin diocese of the Catholic Church in Apulia, in southern Italy, with its episcopal seat at Lucera Cathedral. The diocese reached its present configuration in 1986, by combining the older diocese of Lucera with the diocese of Troia, the seat of which was Troia Cathedral, now a co-cathedral of the united diocese.

== Ecclesiastical history ==
=== Lucera ===
Local tradition traces the origin of the bishopric of Lucera to the third century and Saint Bassus. Two other imaginary bishops, Johannes and Marcus, first appear in a martyrology written in the 11th or 12th century, whose authority is usually rejected.

Pope Gelasius I (492–496) wrote to two local bishops, complaining about the attack on the Monastery in Fundo Luciano in the territory of the diocese of Lucera led by two priests of the diocese of Lucera, and orders the bishops to advise the (unnamed) bishop of Lucera to go to the monastery to ensure that attacks against the clergy should not take place.

The city of Lucera was destroyed in 663, on orders of the Emperor Constans II during a campaign against the Lombards, but the city quickly recovered and was a Lombard stronghold.

The first historically certain named bishop is Marcus, who attended the Roman council of Pope Zacharias in 743.

Lucera fell under Byzantine control in 983.

==== The Muslim colony in Lucera ====
It was in the 1220s, under Bishop Bartolomaeus, that Frederick II began the settlement of Sicilian Saracens at Lucera. In 1234, the community was granted the right to hold a fair by Frederick.

In the 1230s, Pope Gregory IX (Ugo dei Conti di Segni) began sending Dominican preachers into south Italy, particularly to Aversa and Naples to root out heresy. They were also commissioned to convert the Muslims. He also embarked on a campaign to impose a uniform (Latin) baptismal rite on towns which followed the Greek rite. His initiatives were directly challenging to the emperor's policies, and caused considerable trouble for King Frederick and for the bishop of Lucera. In reply, in 1236, Frederick informed the pope that the removal of the Saracens from the mountains of Sicily had made the island much safer, and that, in Lucera, a third of the Muslims had become Christians. But at the end of the 13th century, the majority population of Lucera was still Muslim.

Following the death of Frederick II in 1250, his sons, Conrad IV and then Conradin, continued the Hohenstaufen struggle with the papacy. The infant Conradin was under the regency of his uncle Manfred, Prince of Taranto, who had usurped the regency in May 1254, which had been assigned to Innocent IV. The pope died in Naples on 7 December 1254.

==== Crusade against Lucera and Manfred ====
On 7 May 1255, therefore, Alexander issued the bull "Pia Matris ecclesiae", in which he declared holy war against Manfred and the Muslims of Lucera. Alexander IV, sent a papal army, headed by Cardinal Ottaviano degli Ubaldini, against Lucera, where Manfred had been welcomed and taken up residence, but it was defeated in May 1255, and the crusade was a failure. Bulls calling to renew the crusade were issued, nonetheless, by Urban IV and Clement IV, also without success.

In August 1300, an attack on the Muslim community, organized and led by the Angevin King Charles II of Naples, destroyed nearly all the Muslim colony and killed hundreds. The bishop and clergy were active participants, and appropriated a considerable share of the booty.

==== Suppression of dioceses in favor of Lucera ====
The city of Castel Fiorentino (Farentino) was founded in 1015 by the Byzantine catapan Basil Mesardonites. It was the place of Emperor Frederick II's death in 1250. Following the death of the last bishop of Farentino, who was elected in 1391 and died in 1410, the diocese of Farentino was suppressed, and its territory was added to that of the diocese of Lucera.

In 1425, the diocese of Tortiboli (Tertiveri)- first mentioned in 1067 - was united to Lucera. In 1969, the name (though not the diocese) was revived under its Latin name Tortibulum.

In 1609, 1687, and 1759, the diocese of Lucera is attested as a suffragan of the archdiocese of Benevento.

=== Troia ===
The Byzantine Empire held southern Italy from the 9th to the first quarter of the 11th century. The Protospatharius, Basileios Boioannes, who was κατεπάνω Ἰταλίας from 1017–1028, made Troia the capital of the entire Byzantine Capitanate.

Around 1031, the diocese of Troia is attested as being directly subject to the pope. This was confirmed by Pope Paschal II in a bull of 10 November 1100, granting the bishops of Troia the right to be consecrated by the pope in perpetuum.

In 1127, Count Roger II of Sicily presented Pope Honorius II (1124–1130) with a large gift of gold and silver, and promised him the towns of Troia and Montefusco, if the pope would grant him the standard and title of Duke of Apulia. In November 1127, Pope Honorius was in Troia, where he held a council, in which he excommunicated Count Roger and anyone who should support his efforts to become Duke of Apulia. On 5 December 1127, the pope granted Troia a charter of constitutions and liberties. He also turned aside the leaders of Apulia, fearing the creation of a Norman kingdom in southern Italy.

In 1223, when Foggia was named the imperial capital by the Emperor Frederick II, the town attempted to escape the jurisdiction of the bishops of Troia, claiming that their town had once had a bishop. Pope Honorius III rejected the claim in a bull of 2 June 1223, and his decision was affirmed by his successor Pope Gregory IX.

The Emperor Frederick set sail from Brindisi on the Sixth Crusade on 28 June 1228. Pope Gregory immediately seized the opportunity to send an army into southeast Italy to (re-)claim the area for the papacy. Frederick returned victorious on 10 June 1029. He immediately began demanding oaths and demonstrations of submission from his subjects. Barletta refused, and was destroyed, remaining deserted for 13 years. Submission was demanded of Troia, which refused on the grounds that they had heard that Frederick had died in the Holy Land. On the emperor's insistance the Troians sent two representatives to witness the truth. But even so, one faction still denied that Frederick was emperor. After having received the submission of Naples, Capua, and Aversa, Frederick returned and pillaged the city of Troia.

==== Cathedral ====
The cathedral of Troia, dedicated to the Virgin Mary, was administered by a Chapter of twenty canons, headed by four dignities (led by the Archdeacon, and the Archpriest). In 1675, there were four dignities and sixteen canons. In 1752, there were four dignities and twelve canons.

Pope Urban II held a synod at Troia on 11–12 March 1093, at which fifty-five bishops were in attendance.

=== Post-Napoleonic restoration ===
Following the extinction of the Napoleonic Kingdom of Italy, the Congress of Vienna authorized the restoration of the Papal States and the Kingdom of Naples. Since the French occupation had seen the abolition of many Church institutions in the Kingdom, as well as the confiscation of most Church property and resources, it was imperative that Pope Pius VII and King Ferdinand IV reach agreement on restoration and restitution. Ferdinand, however, was not prepared to accept the pre-Napoleonic situation, in which Naples was a feudal subject of the papacy. Neither was he prepared to accept the large number of small dioceses in his kingdom; following French intentions, he demanded the suppression of fifty dioceses. Lengthy, detailed, and acrimonious negotiations ensued. On 17 July 1816, King Ferdinand issued a decree, in which he forbade the reception of any papal document, including without prior reception of the royal exequatur. This meant that prelates could not receive bulls of appointment, consecration, or installation without the king's permission.

A concordat was finally signed on 16 February 1818, and ratified by Pius VII on 25 February 1818. Ferdinand issued the concordat as a law on 21 March 1818. The re-erection of the dioceses of the kingdom and the ecclesiastical provinces took more than three years. The right of the king to nominate the candidate for a vacant bishopric was recognized, as in the Concordat of 1741, subject to papal confirmation (preconisation). On 27 June 1818, Pius VII issued the bull De Ulteriore in which the metropolitan archdiocese of Benevento was restored. The united dioceses of Montecorvino and Vulturaria were permanently suppressed and added to the territory of the diocese of Lucera. Lucera continued as a suffragan of Benevento.

The diocese of Troia had been immediately subject to the Holy See in 1752, and it remained so under the new arrangements in the Kingdom of Naples in 1818.

Bishop Tommaso Passero, O.P. (1856–1890) held a diocesan synod in Troia in the cathedral on 4–6 October 1874.

=== Post-Vatican-II changes ===
Following the Second Vatican Council, and in accordance with the norms laid out in the council's decree, Christus Dominus chapter 40, Pope Paul VI ordered a reorganization of the ecclesiastical provinces in southern Italy. The decree "Eo quod spirituales" of 12 September 1976 created a new episcopal conference in the region called "Basilicata". Pope Paul VI ordered consultations among the members of the Congregation of Bishops in the Vatican Curia, the Italian Bishops Conference, and the various dioceses concerned.

On 30 April 1979, Pope John Paul II continued the reorganization by promoting the diocese of Foggia to the rank of metropolitan archbishopric, and assigned to its new ecclesiastical province the dioceses of Siponto, Troia (which had been directly subject to the Holy See), Ausculo e Cerignola, Bovino, Lucera, Santo Severino and Vestana.

On 18 February 1984, the Vatican and the Italian State signed a new and revised concordat. Based on the revisions, a set of Normae was issued on 15 November 1984, which was accompanied in the next year, on 3 June 1985, by enabling legislation. According to the agreement, the practice of having one bishop govern two separate dioceses at the same time, aeque personaliter, was abolished. The Vatican continued consultations which had begun under Pope John XXIII for the merging of small dioceses, especially those with personnel and financial problems, into one combined diocese.

On September 30, 1986, the diocese of Troia was united with Lucera to form the diocese of Lucera–Troia, as a suffragan of the also reconstituted Metropolitan Archdiocese of Foggia-Bovino. Both its cathedral in Lucera and its co-cathedral in Troia have the rank of minor basilica.

== Bishops ==
=== Diocese of Lucera ===
Erected: 4th Century
Latin Name: Lucerina

==== to 1450 ====
...

- Anastasius (attested 558–560)

...

- Alfanus (970s)
- Adelchisus
- Landenolfus (c. 987–1005)

...

- Lando (attested 1061–1068)
- Azzo (attested 1075)
- Teudelgardus (attested 1083, 1084)

...

- Benedictus (1096–1099)
- Joannes (1110)
- Robertus (attested 1127)
- Rao (attested 1147)

...

- Andreas (attested 1221–c. 1225)
- Bartolomeus (attested 1225)
- Guilelmus de Ricia ( ? –1294)
- Aimardus (1295–1302)
- Stephanus (1302– ? )
- Jacobus ( ? –1322)
- Augustinus (Gazotti), O.P. (1322–1323)
- Jacobus
- Rogerius
- Martinus
- Antonius (1348–1363)
- Jacobus Gauga (Gurga) (1363–1373)
- Bartholomaeus de Aprano (1373–1378)
- Antonius, O.Min. (1378–1393) Avignon Obedience
- Thomas (1381– ? ) Roman Obedience
- Thomas of Acerno (1378–1381) Roman Obedience
- Bartholomaeus ( ? ) Roman Obedience
- Nicolaus Antonius, O.P. (1394–1422) Avignon Obedience
- Battistachius de Formica (1396– ? ) Roman Obedience
- Battistachius de Formica (1422-1450)

==== 1450 to 1700 ====
- Ladislao Dentice (1450–1476 Died)
- Pietro Ranzano, O.P. (1476–1492 Died)
- Giambattista Contestabili (1493–1496 Died)
- Antonio Torres, O.S.H. (1496–1497 Appointed, Bishop of Nepi e Sutri)
- Raffaele Rocca (1497–1499 Appointed, Bishop of Capri)
- Giovanni Di Luigi, O. Carm. (1499–1512 Appointed, Bishop of Sant'Agata de' Goti)
- Alfonso Carafa (1512–1534)
- Andrea Matteo Palmieri (1534–1535 Resigned)
- Michele Visconti (1535–1538 Died)
- Enrique de Villalobos Xeres (1538–1540 Appointed, Bishop of Squillace)
- Fabio Mignanelli (1540–1553 Appointed, Administrator of Grosseto)
- Pietro de Petris (1553–1580 Died)
- Giulio Monaco (1580–1581 Died)
- Scipione Bozzuti (1582–1591 Died)
- Marco Magnacervo, C.R. (1593–1600 Died)
- Fabio Aresti (1601–1609 Died)
- Lodovico Magio (1609–1618 Died)
- Fabrizio Suardi (Alessandro) (1619–1637 Appointed, Bishop of Caserta)
- Bruno Sciamanna (1637–1642 Appointed, Bishop of Caserta)
- Tommaso D'Avalos, O.P. (1642–1642 Died)
- Silvestro D'Afflitto, C.R. (1643–1661 Died)
- Giambattista Eustachio (1663–1687 Died)

==== 1700 to 1986 ====
- Domenico Morelli (1688–1716)
- Domenico Maria de Liguori (Liguoro), C.R. (1718–1730)
- Vincenzo Ferrero, O.P. (1730–1733)
- Michael Marculli (1733–1759)
- Giuseppe Maria Foschi (1759–1776)
- Giovanni Arcamone, C.R. (1792–1793)
- Alfonso Maria Freda (1798–1816)
- Andrea Portanova (1818–1840)
- Giuseppe Iannuzzi (1843–1871)
- Giuseppe Maria Cotellessa (1872–1889)
- Carmelo Ciotola (1891–1892)
- Giuseppe Consenti, C.SS.R. (1893–1907 Died)
- Lorenzo Chieppa (1909–1918 Died)
- Giuseppe di Girolamo (1920–1941 Resigned)
- Domenico Vendola (1941–1963 Resigned)
- Antonio Cunial (1963–1970)
- Angelo Criscito (1970–1985 Retired)
- Carmelo Cassati, M.S.C. (1985–1986 Resigned)

=== Diocese of Troia ===
==== to 1200 ====
- Orianus (c. 1022 – c. 1028)
- Angelus (1028 – 1039)
- Johannes (1039–1059)
- Arduinus (mentioned in 1059)
- Stephen the Norman (March 1059 – 11 October 1077)
- Gualterius Frangente (2 November 1077 – 4 August 1087)
- Gerard of Piacenza (8 October 1087 – 10 January 1097)
- Hubertus Cenomanicus (20 June 1097 – 13 December 1101)
- Guglielmus Bigoctus (13 January 1102 – 1108)
- Guglielmo (1108 – after 1127?)
- Honorius
- William (mentioned in 1140)
- Hugo (1146)
- Guglielmo (1154–1175)
- Elias (1176–1182)
- Guillelmus (attested 1182–1187)
- Roggerius (1187–1189)
- Gualterius de Palearia (1189– July 1201) deposed

==== 1200 to 1500 ====
- Petrus (attested 1201–1206?)
- Philippus (13 October 1212–1223+)

...
Sede vacante (1249)

- Matteo de Barbuco (20 January 1252 – c. April 1270)

(Bishop Matteo in exile 1252–1266)

Sede vacante (1270–1276)

○ Bertero (1276–1277)

Sede vacante (1277–1278)

- Ugo de Curtis, O.P. (1278–1279)
- Rainerio, O.F.M. (1280–1284)
- Rogerio, O.F.M. (1284–1302)
- Pietro, O.F.M. (9 September 1302 – 1309)
- Guglielmo Bianchi, O.S.B. (1309–1310)
- Beraldo (1311–1322)
- Arnaldo (1322–1332)
- Bisanzio (1332–1341)
- Enrico Trezza (1341 – 1361?)
- Nicola de Cesis (17 November 1361 – 1387)

○ [ Guido (? – 1366) ]

- Bartolomeo di Leone (13 September 1387 – 1410?) Roman Obedience
- Riccardo (1391–1393) Avignon Obedience
- Nicola di Giovinazzo (1393?–1409) Avignon Obedience
- Angelo di Manfredonia (1410–1438) Roman Obedience
- Giacomo Lombardo (4 July 1438 – 1468)
- Giovanni Paolo Vassalli (1469–1474)
- Stefano Grube (1474?–1480)
- Scipione Piscicelli (1480–1484)

==== 1500 to 1800 ====
- Giannozzo Pandolfini (1484–1525)
- Ferrando Pandolfini (1525–1560)

Scipione Rebiba (1560) Apostolic Administrator

- Prospero Rebiba (1560–1593)
- Jacopo Aldobrandini (1593–1606)
- Pietro Antonio Da Ponte, CR (1607–1622)
- Giovanni Battista Roviglioni (9 January 1623 – December 1623)
- Felice Siliceo (18 December 1623 – 1626)
- Giovanni Battista Astalli (19 January 1626 – 17 August 1644)
- Giovanni Tommaso Veneziani (30 January 1645 – 1647)
- Antonio Sacchetti (13 January 1648 – June 1662)
- Sebastiano Sorrentino (12 February 1663 – 17 July 1675)
- Antonio de Sangro, CR (1675–1694)
- Emilio Giacomo Cavalieri (1694–1726)
- Giovanni Pietro Faccoli (11 September 1726 – 2 January 1752)
- Marco De Simone (17 July 1752 – 24 February 1777)
- Giovanni Giacomo Onorati (1777–1793)
  - Sede vacante (1793–1797)
- Gennaro Clemente Francone (1797–1799)

==== 1800 to 1986 ====
Sede vacante (1799–1804)

- Michele Palmieri (1804–1824)
- Antonio Monforte (3 May 1824 – 13 February 1854)
- Tommaso Passero, O.P. (16 July 1856 – 8 September 1890)
- Domenico (Daniele) Tempesta, O.F.M.Ref. (1891–1899)
- Paolo Emilio Bergamaschi (19 June 1899 – 26 July 1910), resigned
- Domenico Lancellotti (21 April 1911 – 14 March 1918, transferred to Conversano)
- Fortunato Maria Farina (21 June 1919 – 15 May 1951), resigned
- Giuseppe Amici (1951–1955)
- Antonio Mistrorigo (9 March 1955 – 25 June 1958, transferred to Treviso)
- Antonio Pirotto (24 August 1958 – 14 December 1974), retired
- Giuseppe Lenotti (14 December 1974 – 28 January 1981)
- Salvatore De Giorgi (4 April 1981 – 30 September 1986), resigned

=== Diocese of Lucera-Troia ===
United: 30 September 1986
Latin Name: Lucerina-Troiana

- Raffaele Castielli (1987–1996 Resigned)
- Francesco Zerrillo (1997–2007 Retired)
- Domenico Cornacchia (2007–2016)
- Giuseppe Giuliano (20 October 2016 – 9 October 2026)
- Giorgio Ferretti (since 9 October 2026)

== Bibliography ==
- Eubel, Conradus, ed. (1913). Hierarchia catholica (in Latin). Vol. Tomus 1 (second ed.). Münster: Libreria Regensbergiana.
- Eubel, Conradus, ed. (1914). Hierarchia catholica (in Latin). Vol. Tomus 2 (second ed.). Münster: Libreria Regensbergiana.
- Eubel, Conradus; Gulik, Guilelmus (1923). Hierarchia catholica (in Latin). Vol. 3 (second ed.). Münster: Libreria Regensbergiana.
- Gams, Pius Bonifatius (1873). Series episcoporum Ecclesiae catholicae: quotquot innotuerunt a beato Petro apostolo (in Latin). Ratisbon: Typis et Sumptibus Georgii Josephi Manz.
- Gauchat, Patritius (Patrice) (1935). Hierarchia catholica (in Latin). Vol. IV (1592-1667). Münster: Libraria Regensbergiana.
- Ritzler, Remigius; Sefrin, Pirminus (1952). Hierarchia catholica medii et recentis aevi (in Latin). Vol. V (1667-1730). Patavii: Messagero di S. Antonio.
- Ritzler, Remigius; Sefrin, Pirminus (1958). Hierarchia catholica medii et recentis aevi (in Latin). Vol. VI (1730-1799). Patavii: Messagero di S. Antonio.
- Ritzler, Remigius; Sefrin, Pirminus (1968). Hierarchia Catholica medii et recentioris aevi sive summorum pontificum, S. R. E. cardinalium, ecclesiarum antistitum series... A pontificatu Pii PP. VII (1800) usque ad pontificatum Gregorii PP. XVI (1846) (in Latin). Vol. VII. Monasterii: Libr. Regensburgiana.
- Remigius Ritzler; Pirminus Sefrin (1978). Hierarchia catholica Medii et recentioris aevi... A Pontificatu PII PP. IX (1846) usque ad Pontificatum Leonis PP. XIII (1903) (in Latin). Vol. VIII. Il Messaggero di S. Antonio.
- Pięta, Zenon (2002). Hierarchia catholica medii et recentioris aevi... A pontificatu Pii PP. X (1903) usque ad pontificatum Benedictii PP. XV (1922) (in Latin). Vol. IX. Padua: Messagero di San Antonio. ISBN 978-88-250-1000-8.

=== Studies ===
- Antonetti, Antonio (2013). "Le elezioni episcopali e i vescovi della rinascita troiana (1266-1284)," (in Italian) in: Carte di Puglia Anno XV, no. 2 (2013), pp. 31–42.
- Antonetti, Antonio (2014). "Alcune note sulla Chiesa lucerina tra Bizantini e Normanni (secc. X-XII)," (in Italian) In:Itinerari di ricerca storica, 2014 n.2, pp. 99–119.
- Antonetti, Antonio (2015). "I vescovi di Lucera del XIII secolo: note per una cronotassi scientifica." (in Italian). In: Archivio storico pugliese 68 (2015), pp. 51–79.
- Antonetti, Antonio (2017). "La documentazione vescovile lucana nella prima età angioina (1266-1310). Una messa a punto della questione." (in Italian). In: F. Panarelli (ed.), Alle fonti della Basilicata medievale: edizioni, progetti e cantieri (Bari 2017), pp. 161–198.
- Antonetti, Antonio (2018). "I vescovi e la territorialzzazione delle diocesi di Puglia, Molise, e Basilicata tra XIII e XIV secolo." (in Italian). In: Rivista di storia della Chiesa in Italia Vol. 72, No. 2 (2018), pp. 379–404.
- Cappelletti, Giuseppe (1870). Le chiese d'Italia: dalla loro origine sino ai nostri giorni (in Italian). Vol. decimonono (19). Venezia: G. Antonelli. pp. 255–275. [Lucera]
- Cappelletti, Giuseppe (1870). Le chiese d'Italia: dalla loro origine sino ai nostri giorni (in Italian). Vol. vigesimoprimo (21). Venezia: G. Antonelli. pp. 457–463. [Troia]
- Kamp, Norbert (1975). Kirche und Monarchie im staufischen Königreich Sizilien: I. Prosopographische Grundlegung, Bistumer und Bistümer und Bischöfe des Konigreichs 1194–1266: 2. Apulien und Calabrien München: Wilhelm Fink 1975. pp. 508–528.
- Kehr, Paulus Fridolin (1962). Italia pontificia. Regesta pontificum Romanorum. Vol. IX: Samnia – Apulia – Lucania. Berlin: Weidmann. (in Latin). Pp. 154 154-160.
- Klewitz, Hans-Walter (1933). "Zur Geschichte der Bistumsorganisation Campaniens und Apuliens im 10. und 11. Jahrhundert," (in German), in: Quellen und Forschungen aus Italienischen Archiven und Bibliotheken Vol 24 (Rome 1932/33), pp. 1-61.
- Lanzoni, Francesco (1927). Le diocesi d'Italia dalle origini al principio del secolo VII (an. 604) (in Italian). Rome: Biblioteca Apostolica Vaticana. pp. 272–277.
- Mattei-Cerasoli, Leone (1919). "Da archivii e biblioteche: Di alcuni vescovi poco noti". (in Italian). In: Archivio storico per le province Neapolitane 44 (Napoli: Luigi Lubrano 1919). pp. 310–335, at 332–334.
- Oldfield, Paul (2007). "Urban Government in Southern Italy, c.1085-c.1127," in: English Historical Review 122, No. 497 (2007), pp. 579–608.
- Pelliccia, Alessio Aurelio (ed.). "Chronici Trojani Fragmentum." (in Latin). In: Alexii Aurelii Pelliccia De Christianae Ecclesiae primae, mediae et novissimae aetatis politia Tomus Tertius. Madrid: apud viduam Joachimi Ibarra, 1795. pp. 358–372.
- Rosso, Pietrantonio (1904), "Ristretto dell' Istoria della Città di Troja e sua Diocesi, dall' origine delle medesime al 1584," (in Italian), in: Rassegna Pugliese vol. 21 (Trani-Bari 1904), pp. 100-109; 155-167; 222-235; 303-311; 367-373. [to c. 1405]. Vol. 22 (1905/06), pp. 50-53; 89-107; 144-; 228-; 347-; Vol. 23 (1907), pp. 88-96; 205-226.
- Rubino, G. (1997). Vescovi e personaggi illustri di Aecae e Troja. (in Italian). Troia 1997.
- Savino, L. (1954). La città di Troja e i suoi vescovi (1022-1954). (in Italian). Foggia 1954
- Ughelli, Ferdinando; Coleti, Niccolò (1721). Italia sacra, sive De Episcopis Italiae (in Latin). Vol. octavus (VIII). Venice: apud Sebastianum Coleti. pp. 313–326.
