= Troia, Apulia =

Troia Troië (Neapolitan)
- Comune
- Città di Troia
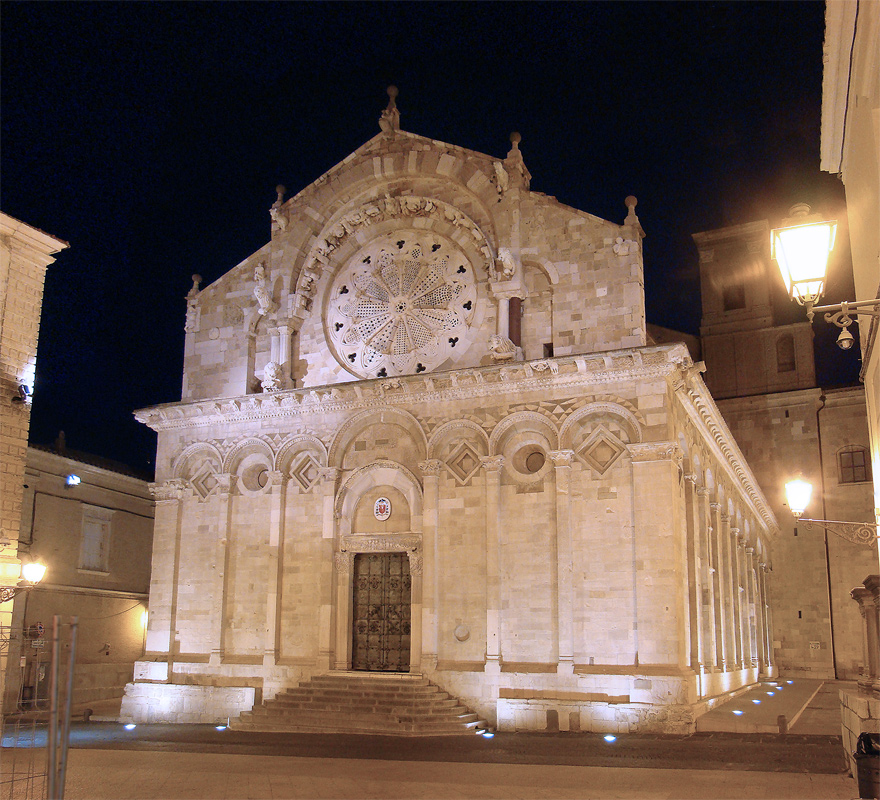
- Cathedral of Troia at night

- Coat of arms

- Location within Italy Location within Apulia
- Coordinates: 41°22′N 15°18′E
- Country: Italy
- Region: Apulia
- Province: Foggia (FG)
- Frazioni: Borgo Giardinetto

Government
  - Mayor: Leonardo Cavalieri

Area
  - Total: 168.25 km^{2} (64.96 sq mi)
- Elevation: 439 m (1,440 ft)

Population (28 February 2017)
  - Total: 7,138
  - Density: 42.42/km^{2} (109.9/sq mi)
- Demonym: Troiani
- Time zone: UTC+1 (CET)
  - Summer (DST): UTC+2 (CEST)
- Postal code: 71029
- Dialing code: 0881
- ISTAT code: 071058
- Patron saint: Sts. Urbanus, Pontianus, Heleuterius, Anastasius and Secondinus
- Saint day: July 17
- Website: Official website

Troia (also formerly Troja; Foggiano: Troië; Ancient Greek: Αῖκαι, romanized: Aîkai; Latin: Aecae) is a town and comune in the province of Foggia and region of Apulia in southern Italy.

== History ==
According to the legend, Troia (Aecae) was founded by the Greek hero Diomedes, who had destroyed the ancient Troy.

Aecae was mentioned both by Polybius and Livy, during the military operations of Hannibal and Quintus Fabius Maximus Verrucosus in Apulia. In common with many other Apulian cities it had joined the Carthaginians after the battle of Cannae, but was recovered by Fabius Maximus in 214 BC, though not without a regular siege. Pliny also enumerates the Aecani among the inland towns of Apulia (iii. 11); but its position is more clearly determined by the Itineraries, which place it on the Appian Way between Aequum Tuticum and Herdonia, at a distance of 29 to 31 kilometres (18 to 19 mi) from the latter city. This interval exactly accords with the position of the modern city of Troia, and confirms the statements of several chroniclers of the Middle Ages, that the latter was founded about the beginning of the 11th century, on the ruins of the ancient Aecae.

Cluverius (1580–1622) erroneously identified Aecae with Accadia, a village in the Daunian Mountains south of Bovino; but his error was rectified by Holstenius.

Troia is an episcopal see, and a place of some consideration; it stands on a hill of moderate elevation, rising above the fertile plain of Apulia, and is 15 kilometres (9 mi) south of Lucera, and 22 kilometres (14 mi) southwest of Foggia.

The current Troia was founded as a fortified town in Apulia in 1018 by Basil Boioannes. It defended the entrance into the Apulian plain from the Normans. Until overshadowed by Foggia, it was an important strategic town in southern Italy, and was several times besieged, notably, by the emperors Henry II and Frederick II. After the latter's fall, it sided for the Angevines, and later, against the former, for the Aragonese.

After the unification of Southern Italy in 1861, Troia rebelled and the Savoy troops intervened with the use of cannons.

== Main sights ==
- Troia Cathedral, an example of Apulian Romanesque architecture
- Basilica of St. Basil (11th century)
- Baroque church of St. Francis
- Church of San Vincenzo (10th century)
- Palazzo Principi d'Avalos
- Jesuits' Palace (16th century)
- Municipal Museum, with archaeological findings from the area and an art gallery
- Diocesan Museum, housed in the 18th century Benedictine Nunnery, and the New Museum of the Cathedral's Treasure. The latter is home to medieval rolls of the Exultet.

== Transportation ==
As of 2009, it was the only municipality in Italy to provide free public transport.

== Climate ==
Climate data for Troia (1991–2020)
Month	Jan	Feb	Mar	Apr	May	Jun	Jul	Aug	Sep	Oct	Nov	Dec	Year
Mean daily maximum °C (°F)	9.6 (49.3)	10.5 (50.9)	13.4 (56.1)	17.5 (63.5)	22.7 (72.9)	28.2 (82.8)	31.1 (88.0)	30.8 (87.4)	25.0 (77.0)	20.2 (68.4)	14.9 (58.8)	10.6 (51.1)	19.5 (67.2)
Daily mean °C (°F)	6.9 (44.4)	7.3 (45.1)	9.7 (49.5)	13.3 (55.9)	18.0 (64.4)	23.0 (73.4)	25.8 (78.4)	25.7 (78.3)	20.7 (69.3)	16.5 (61.7)	11.9 (53.4)	7.9 (46.2)	15.6 (60.0)
Mean daily minimum °C (°F)	4.1 (39.4)	4.1 (39.4)	6.1 (43.0)	9.1 (48.4)	13.3 (55.9)	17.9 (64.2)	20.5 (68.9)	20.5 (68.9)	16.3 (61.3)	12.7 (54.9)	8.9 (48.0)	5.3 (41.5)	11.6 (52.8)
Average precipitation mm (inches)	80 (3.1)	77 (3.0)	74 (2.9)	71 (2.8)	69 (2.7)	65 (2.6)	61 (2.4)	64 (2.5)	68 (2.7)	74 (2.9)	79 (3.1)	81 (3.2)	863 (33.9)
Average relative humidity (%)	80	77	74	71	69	65	61	64	68	74	79	81	72
Source 1: Istituto Superiore per la Protezione e la Ricerca Ambientale
Source 2: Il Meteo (precipitation and humidity)

== See also ==
- Roman Catholic Diocese of Lucera-Troia
