= Lucera Castle =

- Castello di Lucera
- Lucera, Italy
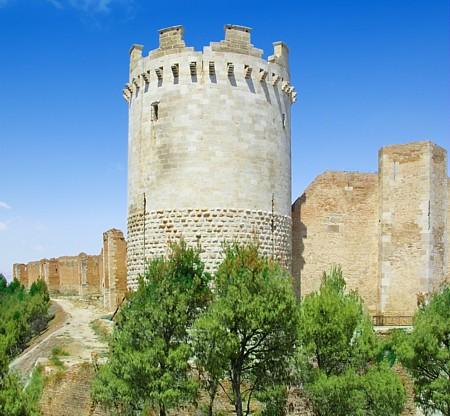
- One of the cylindrical towers of the walls

Location
- Coordinates: 41.509284°N 15.322881°E

Site history
- Built: 1233
- Built by: Frederick II, Holy Roman Emperor

The castle of Lucera is a castle located in the municipality of Lucera, in the province of Foggia, southern Italy, dating back to the 13th century. Currently only remnants of the castle and its walls are left.

== History ==
The construction of the castle was commissioned by Frederick II, Holy Roman Emperor following his decision to relocate the Saracen rebels of Sicily in the town of Lucera.

The castle was built in 1233 on the foundations of a Roman citadel and the walls were added later (between 1269 and 1283) by Charles I of Anjou. This addition was necessary for the difference in use that he wanted to make of the structure: from imperial palace as was intended to fortified castle and permanent military garrison.

The material of construction was mainly acquired from the remains of Roman buildings still present in the area. The castle, in fact, lies in the same place of the acropolis of the ancient Roman city.

The complex was heavily damaged by an earthquake that struck the area in 1456, and was almost completely demolished in the 18th century to use the resulting material for the construction of the court.

This ended in the 19th century, when the first restoration works begun.

== Structure ==
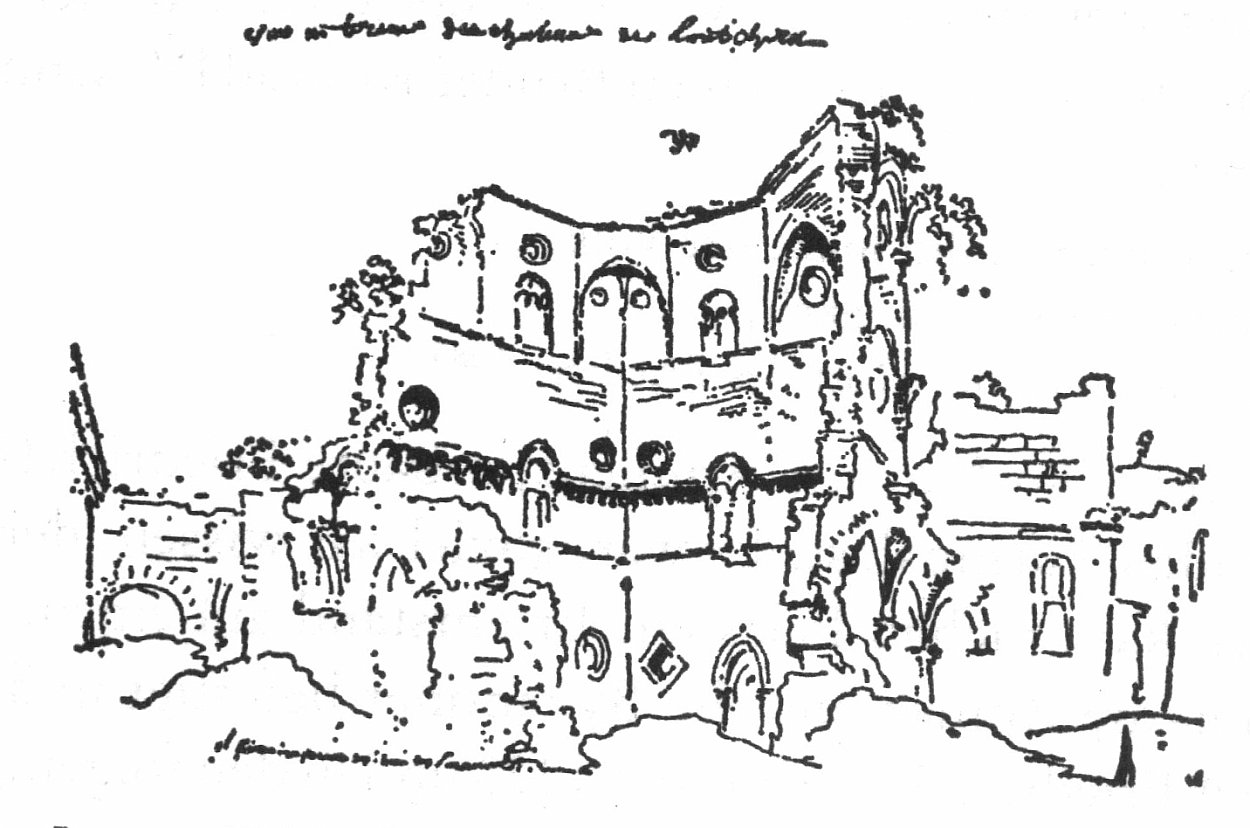
1778 Jean Louis Desprez, illustration of the castle donjon, which later was destroyed

The square truncated pyramidal base, still visible, comes from following French projects. The Hohenstaufen castle, of which there are only buried fragments, was inside this tower, an outward complex that rose three floors. The castle was built around a central square courtyard. The courtyard at the third floor instead presented an octagonal shape, characteristics that resemble very closely the most famous structure built by Frederick II in the area: Castel del Monte.

The Swabian castle had a normal entry at street level. The surrounding French base has no access to the street level, so was raised the question of how it was possible to access it. It has been assumed that the entry was made possible by the presence of ladders downed from above, while the most evocative hypothesis (supported by the discovery of tunnels near the castle) suggests the access from an underground entrance. The absence of a doorway, however, is significant of the strategic importance of the castle, which in this way was more difficult to conquer.

A circular 14-meter-deep cistern located under the courtyard guaranteed the water to the castle.

The irregular wall that surrounds the entire hill on which stands the castle is 900 meters long, and also consists of 13 square towers, two pentagonal bastions, 7 buttresses and two cylindrical corner towers. The latter - with regular section of great precision - were with certainty part of the Frederick's project for Lucera. Even access to these walls - with the bridge over the big dig - reminds the Swabian castles in the homeland of the Emperor, such as the castle of Wildenstein, which has a similar entry.

== Sources ==
- Raffaele Licinio. "Lucera". Enciclopedia Federiciana. Istituto dell'Enciclopedia Italiana Treccani.
