= Foggia Cathedral =

Roman Catholic cathedral in Foggia, Apulia, Italy

Coordinates: 41.4635°N 15.5438°E

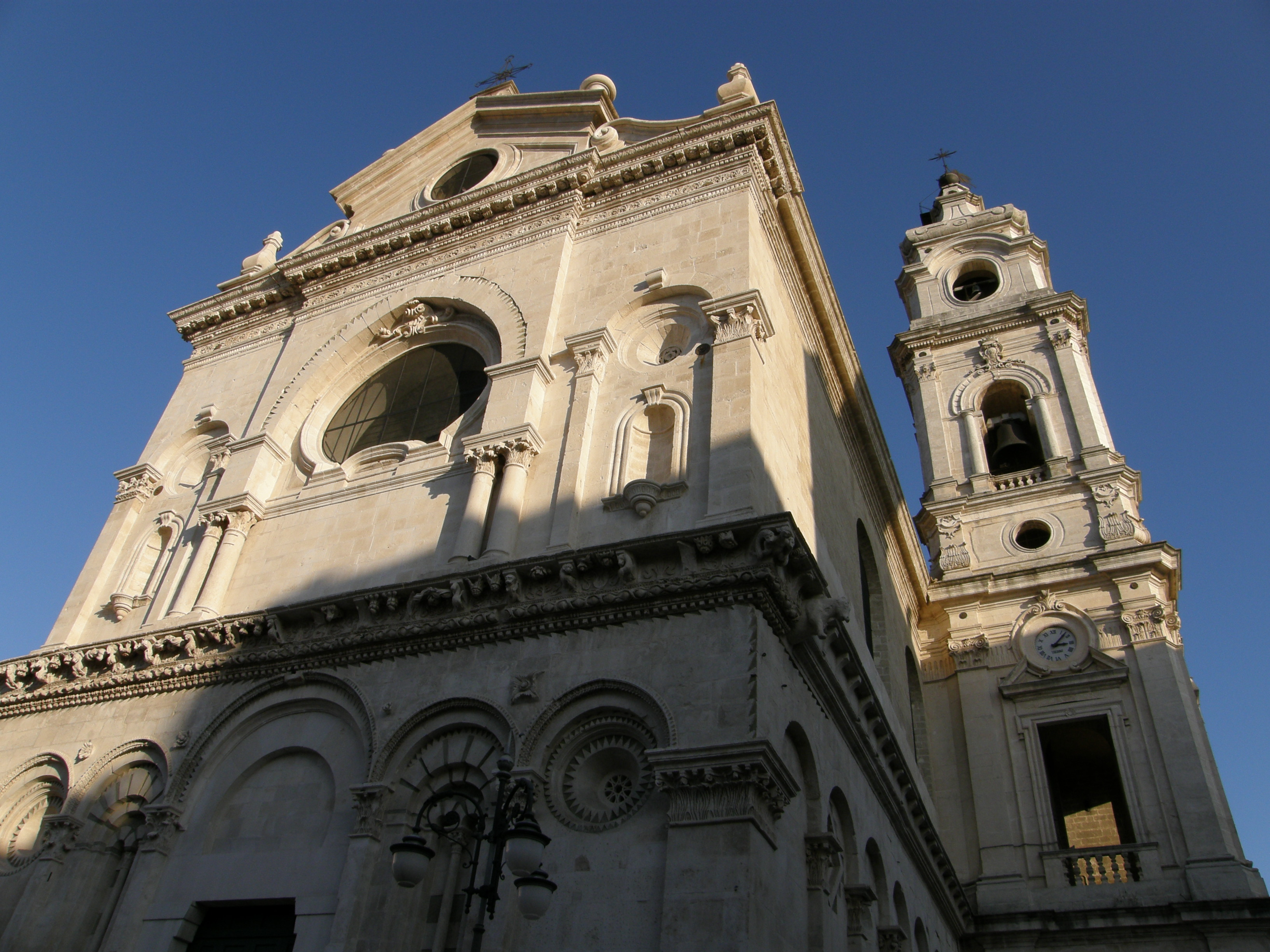
West front of Foggia Cathedral

Foggia Cathedral (Italian: Cattedrale di Foggia, Cattedrale della Santa Maria Assunta in Coelo or della Santa Maria in Fovea; Latin: Santa Maria Icona Vetere), otherwise the Church of the Assumption of the Virgin Mary or Church of Saint Mary of Foggia (Italian: Chiesa della Beata Maria Vergine Assunta in Cielo or Chiesa della Santa Maria di Foggia), is a Roman Catholic cathedral in the city of Foggia, Italy, dedicated to the Assumption of the Virgin Mary. It is the seat of the Archbishop of Foggia-Bovino.

The present Romanesque building was constructed as a collegiate church in the 1170s, but was damaged in the earthquake of 1731 and restored in a Baroque style.

When the Diocese of Foggia was created in 1855, the collegiate church was declared its cathedral. The diocese was elevated to an archdiocese in 1979 and amalgamated with the Diocese of Bovino to form the Archdiocese of Foggia-Bovino in 1986.

The church contains an ancient icon of the Virgin Mary, whence its alternative name of "Santa Maria Icona Vetere". The icon is also sometimes known as the "Madonna dei sette veli", or the Madonna of the Seven Veils.

== Sources ==
- Pace, Valentino, 1994: Kunstdenkmäler in Süditalien – Apulien, Basilicata, Kalabrien. Wiss. Buchges.: Darmstadt ISBN 3-534-08443-8
- Willemsen, Carl Arnold, 1973: Apulien – Kathedralen und Kastelle (2nd ed.) DuMont Schauberg: Köln ISBN 3-7701-0581-8
