= Salvatore De Giorgi =

Italian prelate of the Catholic Church (born 1930)

His Eminence Salvatore De Giorgi
- Cardinal, Archbishop Emeritus of Palermo
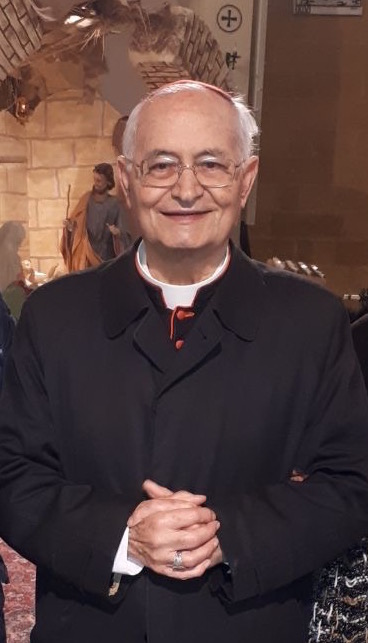
- Church: Catholic Church
- Archdiocese: Palermo
- Appointed: 4 April 1996
- Term ended: 19 December 2006
- Predecessor: Salvatore Pappalardo
- Successor: Paolo Romeo
- Other post: Cardinal-Priest of Santa Maria in Aracoeli
- Previous posts: Auxiliary Bishop of Oria (1973–1975); Titular Bishop of Tulana (1973–1978); Coadjutor Bishop of Oria (1975–1978); Bishop of Oria (1978–1981); Archbishop of Foggia (1981–1986); Bishop of Bovino (1981–1986); Bishop of Troia (1981–1986); Archbishop of Foggia-Bovino (1986–1987); Archbishop of Taranto (1987–1990)

Orders
- Ordination: 28 June 1953 by Francesco Minerva
- Consecration: 27 December 1973 by Francesco Minerva
- Created cardinal: 21 February 1998 by John Paul II
- Rank: Cardinal-Priest

Personal details
- Born: 6 September 1930 (age 96) Vernole, Italy
- Denomination: Roman Catholic
- Motto: in charitate pax
- Coat of arms

Salvatore De Giorgi (born 6 September 1930) is an Italian prelate of the Catholic Church who was Archbishop of Palermo from 1996 until his retirement in 2006. He was made a cardinal in 1998.

He was first made a bishop in 1973 and led other dioceses in his native Apulia from 1978 to 1990.

== Life ==
De Giorgi was born 6 September 1930 in Vernole, in Apulia (Southern Italy). He was ordained a priest in 1953 and was secretary to Bishop Francesco Minerva of Lecce from 1953 to 1958. He also served as diocesan chaplain for the Teachers' Movement of Catholic Action. In 1958 he became parish priest of Our Lady of Grace in Santa Rosa. On 21 November 1973, he was named titular bishop of Tulana and an auxiliary bishop of Oria. He received his episcopal consecration on 27 December. Pope John Paul II appointed him bishop of that see on 17 March 1978. His pastoral ministry was characterized by the accentuation of the spiritual, commitment to the formation of the clergy, the promotion of the laity. Attentive to ecumenical and interreligious dialogue, he was also particularly sensitive to social problems, especially those concerning the family, youth and the protection of life, and has directed special attention to the situation of the marginalized.

On 4 April 1981, he was made archbishop of Foggia. From 1987 to 1990, he served as Archbishop of Taranto. In 1990, he was appointed General Chaplain of Italian Catholic Action, a position he held until Pope John Paul II appointed him archbishop of Palermo on 4 April 1996. At the same time, he was also elected President of the Sicilian Episcopal Conference. He was often outspoken in his condemnation of organized crime and the mafia. He has visited emigrants from Palermo in the Italian communities in Melbourne, Australia, Chicago and Milwaukee in the United States of America, in Toronto, Canada and London in England.

De Giorgi was named a Cardinal-Priest of Santa Maria in Aracoeli on 21 February 1998. On 25 February, he was made a member of the Pontifical Council for the Laity and the Pontifical Council for the Family. On 18 February 1999, he was named a member of the Congregation for the Clergy. He was one of the cardinal electors who participated in the 2005 papal conclave that elected Pope Benedict XVI. He retired as Archbishop of Palermo on 19 December 2006 and was succeeded by Archbishop Paolo Romeo, who had been apostolic nuncio to Italy and San Marino.

Styles of Salvatore De Giorgi
- Reference style: His Eminence
- Spoken style: Your Eminence
- Informal style: Cardinal
- See: Palermo (emeritus)

De Giorgi is a writer and journalist. He has authored several religious publications, including Un servizio di amore per una Chiesa di frontiera (2015).

Pope Benedict XVI appointed him to a commission to investigate leaks of confidential documents. It first met on 24 April 2012. In May 2013, Pope Francis designated De Giorgi his representative to officiate at the beatification of Father Pino Puglisi, killed by the mafia in 1993. As generally, the Pope chooses either the Prefect of the Congregation for the Causes of Saints or the Cardinal Secretary of State, this was seen as unprecedented.

Catholic Church titles
Preceded by Joseph Bonhomme	— TITULAR — Titular Bishop of Tulana; 21 November 1973 – 29 November 1975	Succeeded by Manuel Cruz Sobreviñas
Preceded by Alberico Semeraro	Bishop of Oria; 17 March 1978 – 4 April 1981	Succeeded by Armando Franco
Preceded by Giuseppe Lenotti	Archbishop of Foggia-Bovino; 4 April 1981 – 10 October 1987	Succeeded by Giuseppe Casale
Preceded by Giuseppe Lenotti	Bishop of Bovino; 4 April 1981 – 30 September 1986	Diocese suppressed
Preceded by Giuseppe Lenotti	Bishop of Troia; 4 April 1981 – 30 September 1986	Diocese suppressed
Preceded by Guglielmo Motolese	Archbishop of Taranto; 10 October 1987 – 11 May 1990	Succeeded by Benigno Luigi Papa
Preceded by Camillo Ruini	General Ecclesiastical Assistant of Italian Catholic Action; 2 February 1990 – 4 April 1996	Succeeded by Agostino Superbo
Preceded by Salvatore Pappalardo	Archbishop of Palermo; 4 April 1996 – 19 December 2006	Succeeded by Paolo Romeo
Preceded by Juan Landázuri Ricketts	Cardinal Priest of Santa Maria in Ara Coeli; 21 February 1998 –	Incumbent
