= Archdiocese of Foggia–Bovino =

Roman Catholic archdiocese in Italy

Coordinates: 41.4667°N 15.5667°E

Archdiocese of Foggia-Bovino Archidioecesis Fodiana-Bovinensis

Catholic
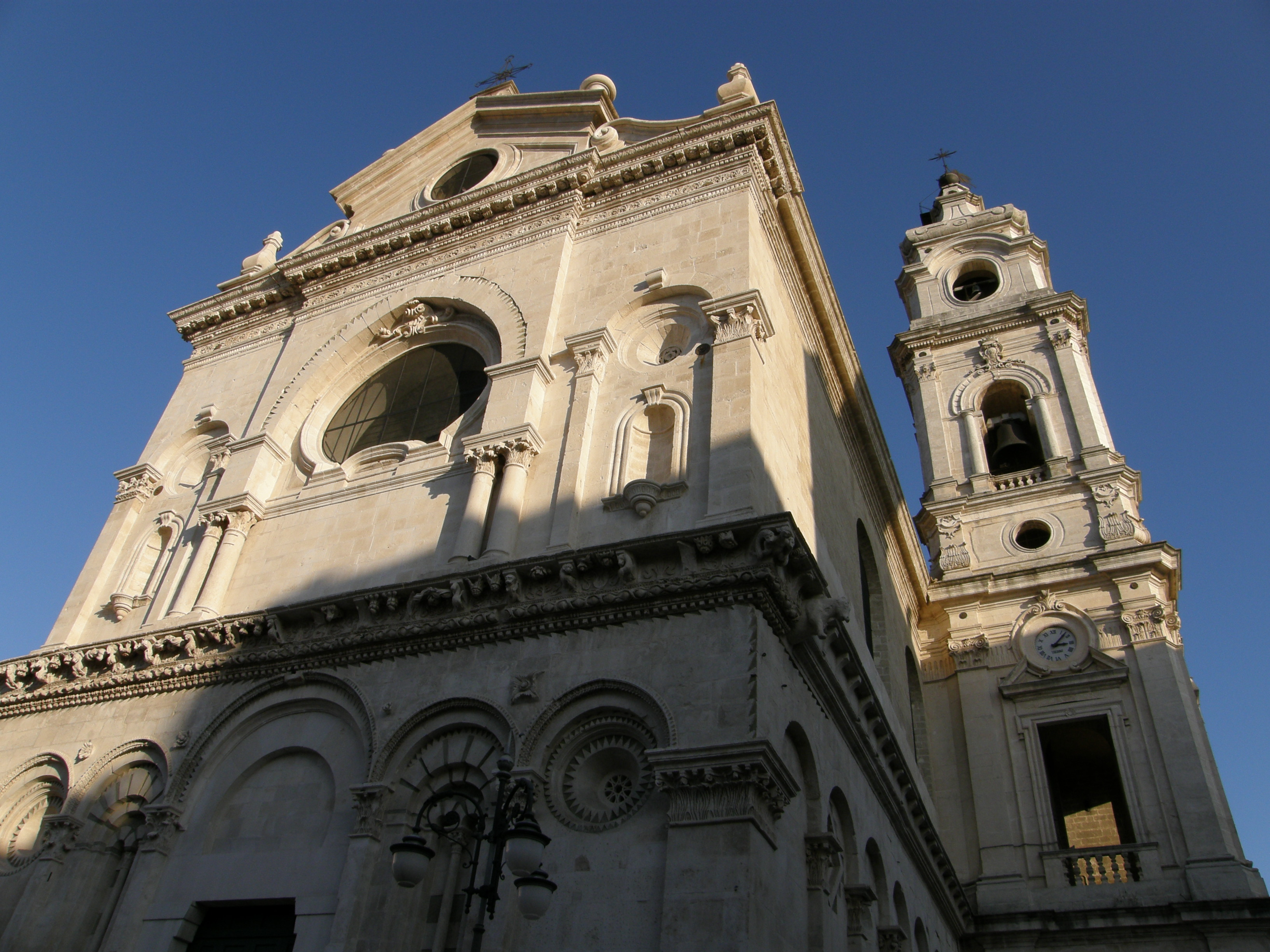
- Foggia Cathedral

Location
- Country: Italy
- Ecclesiastical province: Foggia-Bovino

Statistics
- Area: 1,666 km^{2} (643 sq mi)
- Population: Total; Catholics: (as of 2023); 205,900 (est.) ▼; 205,700 (guess) ▼
- Parishes: 54

Information
- Denomination: Catholic Church
- Rite: Roman Rite
- Established: 25 June 1855 (171 years ago)
- Cathedral: Cattedrale di S. Maria Assunta in Cielo (Iconavetere), Foggia
- Co-cathedral: Basilica Concattedrale di S. Maria Assunta, Bovino
- Secular priests: 68 diocesan ▼65 (religious orders) ▲14 Permanent Deacons ▲

Current leadership
- Pope: Leo XIV
- Archbishop: Giorgio Ferretti
- Bishops emeritus: Francesco Pio Tamburrino; Vincenzo Pelvi

Map
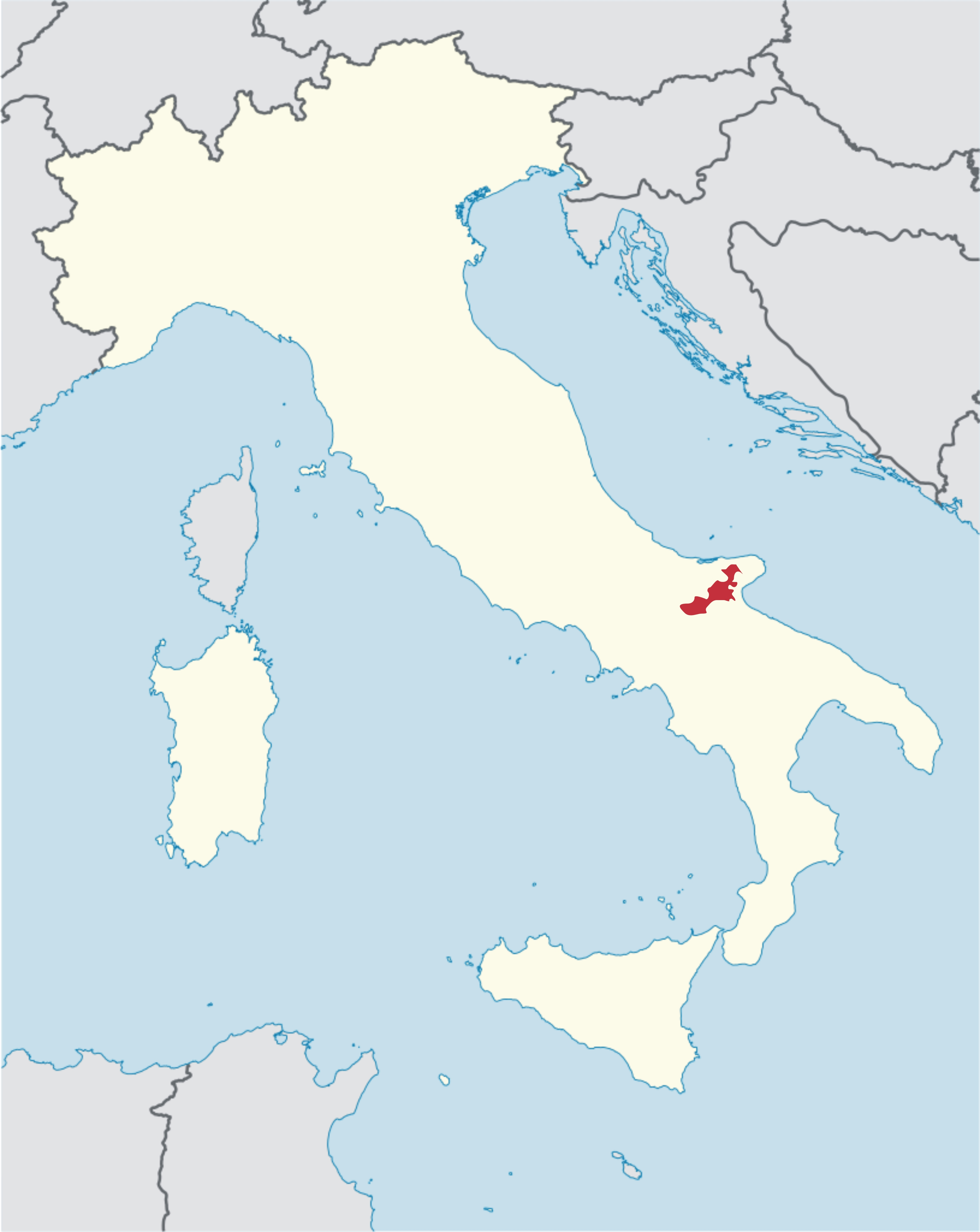

Website
- www.diocesifoggiabovino.it

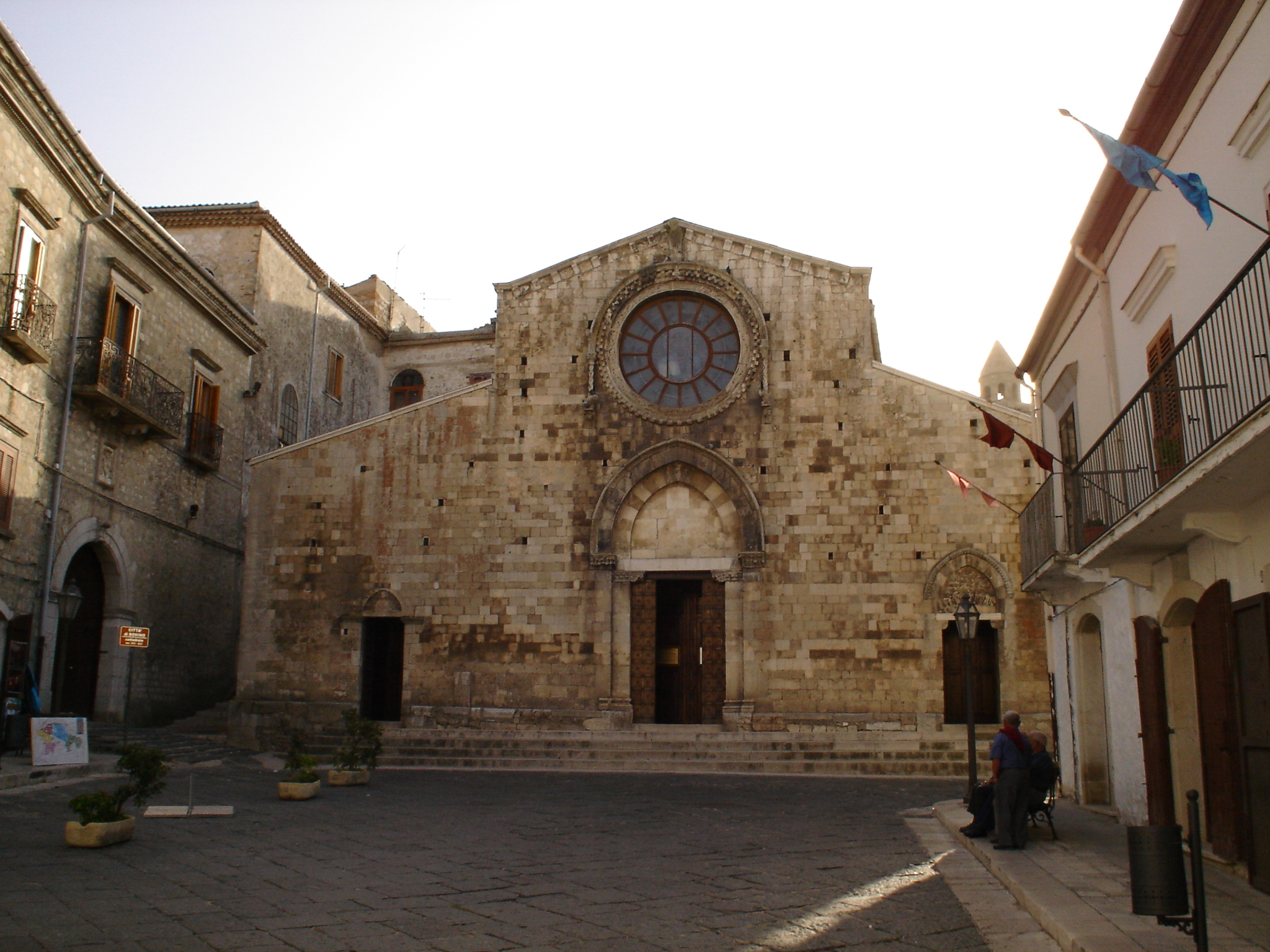
Co-cathedral of S. Maria Assunta, in Bovino

The Archdiocese of Foggia-Bovino (Latin: Archidioecesis Fodiana-Bovinensis) is a Latin archdiocese of the Catholic Church in Apulia, southern Italy. It was created in 1979, by promoting the bishopric of Foggia to the status of metropolitan, with seven suffragan bishoprics. In 1986, one of the suffragans, the bishopric of Bovina, was suppressed and united with the metropolitan archdiocese of Foggia, which became the archdiocese of Foggia-Bovino.

== History ==
Foggia, which had been a town at the confluence of highways from Ancona, Rome, and Naples, was promoted and developed by the work of the Emperor Frederick II. He began a castle there in 1223, followed by a royal palace, which became his favorite residence. As one of his inscriptions states, Frederick intended "that the city of Foggia might become the illustrious royal seat of the empire."

In March 1731, the territory of Foggia was the victim of a major earthquake. A third of the city was destroyed, and the ecclesiastical infrastructure suffered major damage. The major church (later the cathedral) was ruined, the monastery of the Annunziata and the monastery of Santa Chiara were partially destroyed, the convent of the Capuchins was heavily damaged, as was that of the Pentite. The palace of the bishop of Troia was damaged. The number of dead exceeded 500. It also suffered in the earthquakes of 1866 and 1882.

=== Establishment of the diocese ===
Troia was 30 km or 19 mi from Foggia, a point remarked on by Pope Pius. The town of Foggia was at the extreme southern end of the diocese of Troja, and there was some bad feeling between the clergy of the two towns, according to Pope Pius IX. After the death of Bishop Antonio Monforte of Troja on 13 February 1854, plans were advanced to remedy the situation and provide a more logical distribution of ecclesiastical territories.

The Diocese of Foggia (Latin Name: Fodiana) was established by Pope Pius IX on 25 June 1855, in the bull Ex hoc Summi Pontificis, on territory split off from the Diocese of Troia. It included the territory of S. Marco in Lamis, which had been part of the diocese of Siponto. The diocese of Foggia, like the diocese of Troia, was exempt, i.e. immediately subject to the Holy See, not part of any ecclesiastical province.

Foggia had a seminary (high school) which was suitable for converting into a diocesan seminary.

=== Chapter and Cathedral ===
The collegiate church of S. Maria in Foggia was raised to the dignity of a cathedral, dedicated to the Assumption of the Body of the Virgin Mary into Heaven. It was administered by a corporate body called the Chapter, composed of four dignities (the Archpriest, the Primicerius, the Cantor, and the Treasurer) and fourteen canons. There were also six beneficed "mansionarii", who saw to the daily routine of religious services. The cathedral was also a parish church, whose parishioners were under the care of the Archpriest. The city had four other churches, one of which contained a wonder-working statue of the Sorrowful Virgin Mary; five convents of mendicant friars, and three establishments of monks.

The Chapter of the cathedral of Foggia currently (2022) consists of a president and four canons.

On 14 December 1974, Pope Paul VI appointed Giuseppe Lenotti, the Bishop of Foggia (1962–1979), to be at the same time Bishop of Bovino, aeque personaliter. On the same day, he was then also named Bishop of Troia. On 4 April 1981, Pope John Paul II appointed as successor to Bishop Lenotti, Bishop Salvatore De Giorgi, with the title of metropolitan archbishop of Foggia, Bovino, and Troia.

=== Metropolitan ===
On 30 April 1979, the diocese was promoted to the rank of Metropolitan Archdiocese of Foggia (Latin Name: Fodiana-Bovinensis). It was assigned as suffragan dioceses: Siponto, Troia, Asculum et Cerinola, Bovino, Lucera, and S. Severo.

=== Reorganization of 1986 ===
The Second Vatican Council (1962–1965), in order to ensure that all Catholics received proper spiritual attention, decreed the reorganization of the diocesan structure of Italy and the consolidation of small and struggling dioceses.

On 18 February 1984, the Vatican and the Italian State signed a new and revised concordat. Based on the revisions, a set of Normae was issued on 15 November 1984, which was accompanied in the next year, on 3 June 1985, by enabling legislation. According to the agreement, the practice of having one bishop govern two separate dioceses at the same time, aeque personaliter, was abolished. Instead, the Vatican continued consultations which had begun under Pope John XXIII for the merging of small dioceses, especially those with personnel and financial problems, into one combined diocese.

On 30 September 1986, Pope John Paul II ordered that the dioceses of Foggio e Bovino be merged into one diocese with one bishop, with the Latin title Archidioecesis Fodiana-Bovinensis. The seat of the diocese was to be in Foggia, and the cathedral of Foggia was to serve as the cathedral of the merged dioceses. The cathedral in Bovino was to become a co-cathedral, and the cathedral Chapter was to be a Capitulum Concathedralis. There was to be only one diocesan Tribunal, in Foggia, and likewise one seminary, one College of Consultors, and one Priests' Council. The territory of the new diocese was to include the territory of the former diocese of Bovino. Foggia also gained territory from the Archdiocese of Manfredonia.

==== Change of territory ====
On 1 January 1994, the Congregation of Bishops approved the transfer of the Convento Maria Sanctissima di Stignano, situated some 10 mi. to the west of the town of S. Marco in Lamis, from the jurisdiction of the diocese of San Severo to the archdiocese of Foggia-Bovino.

== Ecclesiastical province ==
Since 1986, the metropolitan archdiocese of Foggia-Bovino has had four Suffragan dioceses:

- Roman Catholic Diocese of Cerignola-Ascoli Satriano
- Roman Catholic Diocese of Lucera-Troia
- Roman Catholic Archdiocese of Manfredonia-Vieste-San Giovanni Rotondo
- Roman Catholic Diocese of San Severo

== Bishops and archbishops ==
=== Bishops of Foggia ===
- Bernardino Maria Frascolla (24 February 1856 – 30 December 1869)
- Geremia Cosenza, O.F.M. (1872 – 1882)
- Domenico Marinangeli (27 March 1882 – 16 January 1893)
- Carlo Mola, C.O. (12 June 1893 – 29 April 1909)
- Salvatore Bella (29 April 1909 – 17 December 1920)
- Pietro Pomares y Morant (27 August 1921 – 16 October 1924)
- Fortunato Maria Farina (18 December 1924 – 1 February 1954 Retired)
- Giuseppe Amici (1 February 1954 – 1 February 1955)
- Paolo Carta (9 March 1955 – 22 March 1962)
- Giuseppe Lenotti (1962 – 30 April 1979)

Auxiliary Bishop: Mario De Santis (14 December 1974 – 17 January 1985)

=== Metropolitan Archbishops of Foggia ===
- Giuseppe Lenotti (see above 30 April 1979 – 28 January 1981)
- Salvatore De Giorgi (1981–1986 see below)

=== Metropolitan Archbishops of Foggia-Bovino ===
- Salvatore De Giorgi (see above 30 September 1986 – 10 October 1987)
- Giuseppe Casale (7 May 1988 – 27 May 1999)
- Domenico Umberto D'Ambrosio (27 May 1999 – 8 March 2003)
- Francesco Pio Tamburrino, O.S.B.Subl. (2003 – 2014)
- Vincenzo Pelvi (11 October 2014 – 18 November 2023 retired)
- Giorgio Ferretti (18 November 2023 – )

== See also ==
- Roman Catholic Diocese of Bovino
- List of Catholic dioceses in Italy

== Bibliography ==
- Caggese, Romolo (1910). Foggia e la Capitanata. (in Italian). Bergamo: Istituto italiano d'arti grafiche, 1910.
- Cappelletti, Giuseppe (1870). Le chiese d'Italia dalla loro origine sino ai nostri giorni (in Italian). Vol. vigesimoprimo (21). Venezia: Antonelli. pp. 479–481.
- Dibisceglia, Angelo G. (2005). L’episcopato a Foggia. (in Italian), Relazione alle Giornate di Studio «Dalle radici ai frutti» nel 150° anniversario della istituzione della Diocesi di Foggia (Foggia - Aula Magna della Facoltà di Giurisprudenza - 12 novembre 2005)
- Di Gioia, Michele (1975). Il Duomo di Foggia: (appunti per la storia e l'arte). (in Italian). Volume 2 of Archivum Fodianum. Foggia: Ed. Apulis, 1975.
- Lattanzio, Valerio. Cattedrale di Foggio (tesi, Università di Foggia) [self-published]
- Ritzler, Remigius; Sefrin, Pirminus (1968). Hierarchia Catholica medii et recentioris aevi (in Latin). Vol. VII (1800–1846). Monasterii: Libreria Regensburgiana.
- Perifano, Casimiro (1831). Cenni storici su la origine della città di Foggia. (in Italian). Foggia: Giacomo Russo 1831.
- Remigius Ritzler; Pirminus Sefrin (1978). Hierarchia catholica Medii et recentioris aevi (in Latin). Vol. VIII (1846–1903). Il Messaggero di S. Antonio.
- Villani, Carlo (1913). Cronistoria de Foggia (1848-1870). (in Italian). Forni, 1913.

=== External links ===
- Gabriel Chow, GCatholic.org, with Google map and satellite photo
