= Lucera =

- Comune
- Comune di Lucera
- Coat of arms

- Location of Lucera in the province of Foggia

- Location within Italy Location within Apulia
- Coordinates: 41°30′N 15°20′E
- Country: Italy
- Region: Apulia
- Province: Foggia (FG)

Government
  - Mayor: Giuseppe Pitta (coalition of municipal lists)

Area
  - Total: 339.79 km^{2} (131.19 sq mi)
- Elevation: 219 m (719 ft)

Population (June 2012)
  - Total: 34,243
  - Density: 100.78/km^{2} (261.01/sq mi)
- Demonym: Lucerini
- Time zone: UTC+1 (CET)
  - Summer (DST): UTC+2 (CEST)
- Postal code: 71036
- Dialing code: 0881
- Patron saint: St Mary
- Saint day: 16 August
- Website: Official website

Lucera (Lucerino: Lucére) is an Italian city of 34,243 inhabitants in the province of Foggia in the region of Apulia, and the seat of the Diocese of Lucera-Troia.

Located upon a flat knoll in the Tavoliere Plains, near the foot of Daunian Mountains, Lucera was the capital of Province of Capitanata and the County of Molise from 1579 until 1806.

== History ==
=== Ancient era and early Middle Ages ===
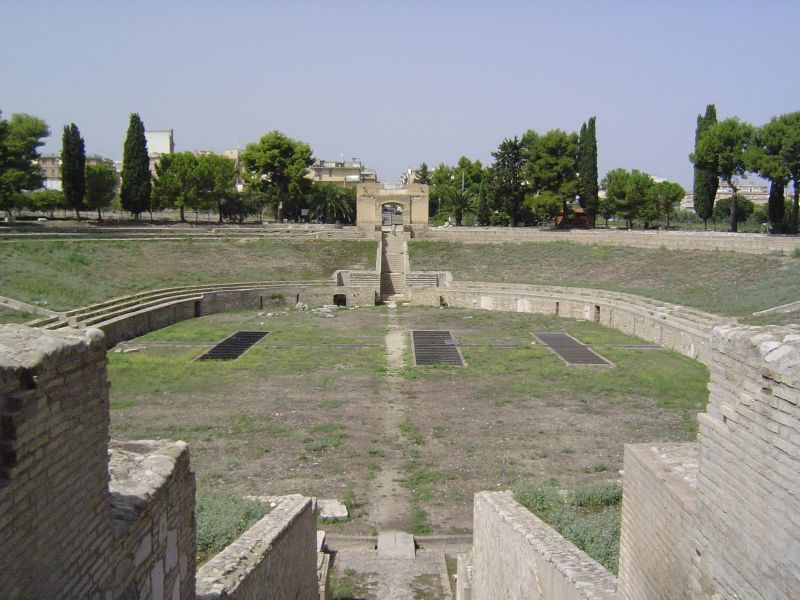
Amphitheatre of Lucera.

Lucera is located in the territory of the ancient tribe of the Daunii. Archeological excavations show the presence of a Bronze Age village inside the city boundaries. Lucera was probably named after either Lucius, a mythical Daunian king, or a temple dedicated to the goddess Lux Cereris. A third possibility is that the city was founded and named by the Etruscans, in which case the name probably means Holy Wood (luc = "wood", eri = "holy").

In 321 BC, the Roman army was deceived into thinking Lucera was under siege by the Samnites. Hurrying to relieve their allies the army walked into an ambush and were defeated at the famous Battle of the Caudine Forks. The Samnites occupied Lucera but were thrown out after a revolt. The city sought Roman protection and in 320 BC was granted the status of Colonia Togata, which meant it was ruled by the Roman Senate. In order to strengthen the ties between the two cities, 2,500 Romans moved to Lucera. From then on, Lucera was known as a steadfast supporter of Rome.

During the civil wars of the late Republic, Pompey set up his headquarters in Lucera, but abandoned the city when Julius Caesar approached. Lucera quickly switched its allegiance and Caesar's clemency spared it from harm. In the next civil war between Octavian and Mark Anthony the city did not escape as lightly. After the war, Octavian settled many veteran soldiers on the lands of the ruined city. This helped Lucera recover quickly and marked an era of renewed prosperity. Many of the surviving Roman landmarks hail from this Augustan period, among them the Luceran amphitheatre.

With the fall of the Western Roman Empire the city of Lucera entered into a state of decline. In 663 AD, it was captured from the Lombards and destroyed by the Eastern Roman Emperor Constans II. A year later in 664 AD, the town was sacked by the Byzantine Empire to ward off Muslim expansion into southern Italy.

=== Islamic period ===
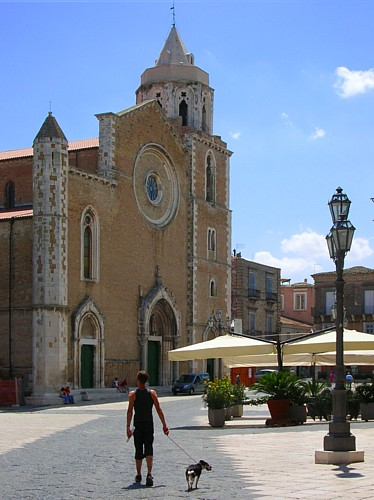
Lucera Cathedral was converted into a mosque during the brief Muslim settlement of Lucera.

In 1224, Holy Roman Emperor Frederick II, responding to religious uprisings in Sicily, expelled all Muslims from the island, transferring many to Lucera (Lugêrah, as it was known in Arabic) over the next two decades. In this controlled environment, they could not challenge royal authority and they benefited the crown in taxes and military service. Their numbers eventually reached between 15,000 and 20,000, leading Lucera to be called Lucaera Saracenorum because it represented the last stronghold of Islamic presence in Italy. During peacetime, Muslims in Lucera were predominantly farmers. They grew durum wheat, barley, legumes, grapes and other fruits. Muslims also kept bees for honey.

The colony thrived for 75 years until it was sacked in 1300 by Christian forces under the command of Giovanni Pippino di Barletta, with the acquiescence of Charles II of Naples. The majority of the city's Muslim inhabitants were slaughtered or – as happened to almost 10,000 of them – sold into slavery. Their abandoned mosques were demolished, and churches were usually built in their place, including the cathedral of S. Maria della Vittoria. The city and its history of this period find mention in the novel A Sultan in Palermo by Tariq Ali.

After the expulsions of Muslims in Lucera, Charles II replaced Lucera's Saracens with Christians, chiefly Burgundian and Provençal soldiers and farmers, following an initial settlement of 140 Provençal families in 1273. A remnant of the descendants of these Provençal colonists, still speaking a Franco-Provençal dialect, has survived until the present day in the villages of Faeto and Celle di San Vito.

== Main sights ==
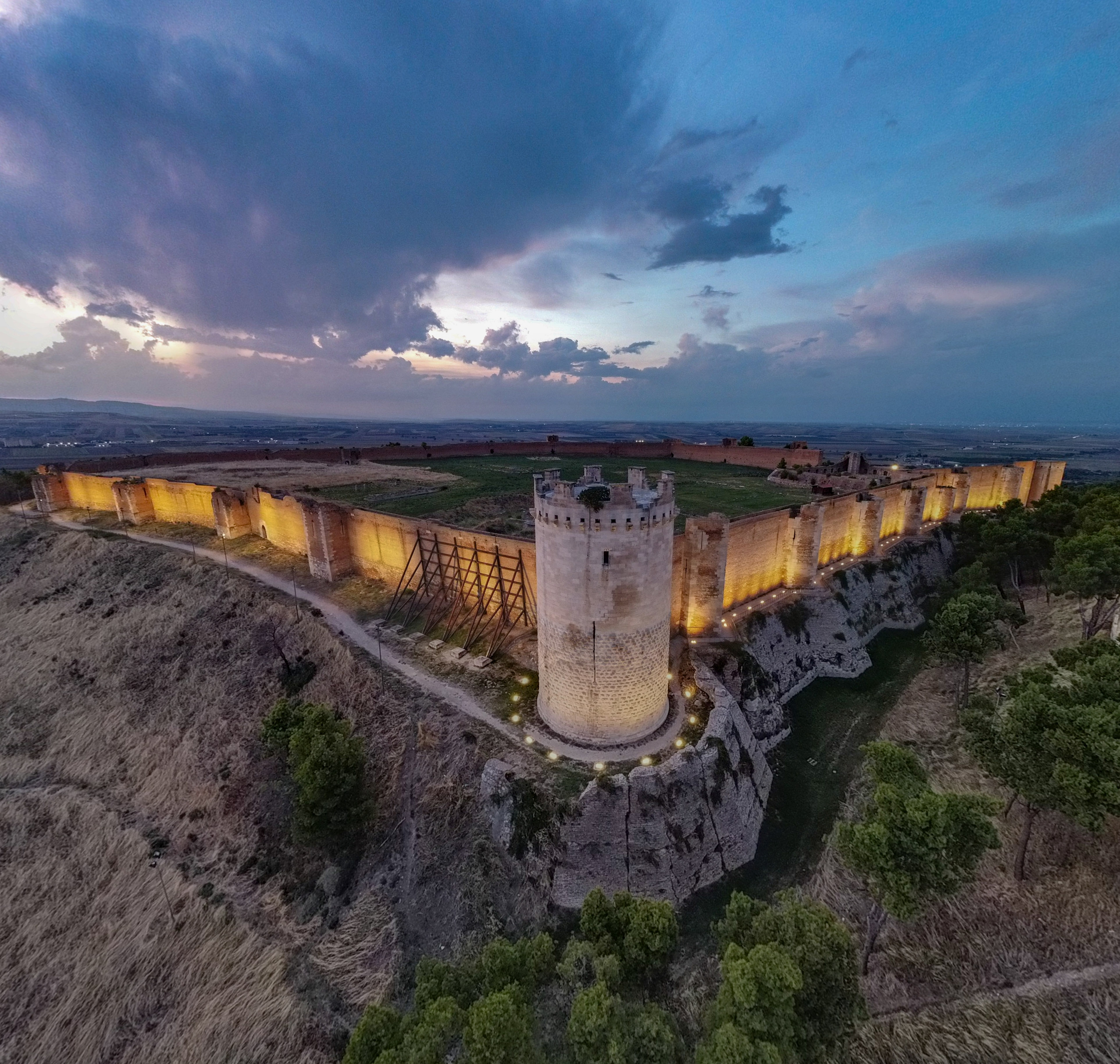
The Hohenstaufen fortress, Lucera Castle.

Sights in Lucera include:

- the Roman Amphitheater, dating to Augustus' times and one of the largest in southern Italy. It was discovered in 1932: during the excavations, a statue of Augustus was found in the site. It measures c. 131 by 99 metres (430 by 325 ft), of elliptical plan, and could host from 16,000 to 18,000 spectators. The area measures 75.2 x 43.2 m. The amphitheater could be accessed from two large portals, one towards Lucera and one towards Foggia; the two side accesses, as well as the external walls, are no more visible. It was perhaps destroyed in the capture of the city by the Eastern Roman Emperor Constans II in 663.
- the medieval Lucera Castle
- the Church of St. Francis
- the Cathedral, built in 1300 on the grounds of the last standing medieval mosque in Italy, which had been destroyed the same year.
- Church of the Carmen
- Church of St. Dominic
- Church of St. Antony the Abbot, whose dome was once part of the city's mosque.
- Church of St. John the Baptists

== Economy ==
The commune of Lucera is home to the Denominazione di origine controllata (DOC) wine of Cacc'e mmitte di Lucera. This red Italian wine is said to have gotten its name from the local dialect referring to the act of pouring a wine from cask to goblet and going back for seconds. The DOC includes 80 hectares (198 acres) of land around the commune with all grapes destined for DOC wine production needing to be harvested to a yield no greater than 14 tonnes/ha. The wine is made primarily (35-60%) from the Uva di Troia grape (known in Lucera under the synonym Sumarello), Montepulciano, Sangiovese and Malvasia nera (the latter three grapes collectively making up between 25-35% of the blend). White wine grape varieties are also permitted in this red wine with Trebbiano Toscano, Bombino bianco and Malvasia del Chianti collectively allowed to account for between 15-30% of the blend. The finished wine must attain a minimum alcohol level of 11.5% in order to be labelled with the Cacc'e mmitte di Lucera DOC designation.

== Climate ==
The city is characterized by a Mediterranean climate, with long, hot summers, with extreme temperature changes during the day, and mild winters, although due to its proximity to the Daunian mountains the temperature can drop to values below 0 °C (32 °F). The winds are quite frequent and, although sometimes quite strong, are usually moderate.

The average annual temperature is around 15 °C (59 °F), and rainfall amounts to an average value of 497 millimetres (19.6 in). Snowfalls are rare.

Climate data for Lucera (1991–2020)
Month	Jan	Feb	Mar	Apr	May	Jun	Jul	Aug	Sep	Oct	Nov	Dec	Year
Mean daily maximum °C (°F)	11.2 (52.2)	12.3 (54.1)	15.2 (59.4)	19.1 (66.4)	24.1 (75.4)	29.3 (84.7)	31.7 (89.1)	31.6 (88.9)	26.0 (78.8)	21.6 (70.9)	16.3 (61.3)	12.2 (54.0)	20.9 (69.6)
Daily mean °C (°F)	8.5 (47.3)	9.1 (48.4)	11.6 (52.9)	14.9 (58.8)	19.5 (67.1)	24.4 (75.9)	26.9 (80.4)	26.8 (80.2)	21.9 (71.4)	17.9 (64.2)	13.3 (55.9)	9.6 (49.3)	17.0 (62.7)
Mean daily minimum °C (°F)	5.7 (42.3)	5.9 (42.6)	7.9 (46.2)	10.7 (51.3)	14.9 (58.8)	19.5 (67.1)	22.0 (71.6)	22.1 (71.8)	17.9 (64.2)	14.2 (57.6)	10.3 (50.5)	7.0 (44.6)	13.2 (55.7)
Average precipitation mm (inches)	42 (1.7)	41 (1.6)	43 (1.7)	36 (1.4)	37 (1.5)	36 (1.4)	26 (1.0)	27 (1.1)	46 (1.8)	53 (2.1)	53 (2.1)	57 (2.2)	497 (19.6)
Average relative humidity (%)	80	77	74	71	69	65	61	64	68	74	79	81	72
Source 1: Istituto Superiore per la Protezione e la Ricerca Ambientale
Source 2: Il Meteo (precipitation and humidity)

== International relations ==
=== Twin towns – Sister cities ===
Lucera is twinned with:

- Jesi, Italy, since 1970
- San Cipirello, Italy, since 1989
- Trogir, Croatia, since 1970

== See also ==
- History of Islam in southern Italy
- Bishopric of Lucera–Troia
- Coinage of Luceria

== Sources ==
- Alexander Knaak: Prolegomena zu einem Corpuswerk der Architektur Friedrichs II. von Hohenstaufen im Königreich Sizilien 1220–1250, Marburg 2001. ISBN 3-89445-278-1 (For the medieval Lucera Castle of the Hohenstaufen see pp. 24–38)
- Aalulbayt Library, An Introduction to the Spread of Islam
- Taylor, Julie (19 August 2003). Muslims in Medieval Italy: The Colony at Lucera (1st ed.). Lexington Books. ISBN 9780739157978.
- University of Michigan-Dearborn, UM-Dearborn professor publishes history of Muslim community in medieval Italy (press release), 20 November 2003
