= 1464 conclave =

Election of Catholic Pope Paul II

Papal conclave August 1464

Dates and location
- 28–30 August 1464; Apostolic Palace, Papal States

Key officials
- Dean: Basilios Bessarion
- Camerlengo: Ludovico Trevisan
- Protopriest: Petrus von Schaumberg
- Protodeacon: Roderic de Borja

Election
- Ballots: 1

Elected pope
- Pietro Barbo; Name taken: Paul II
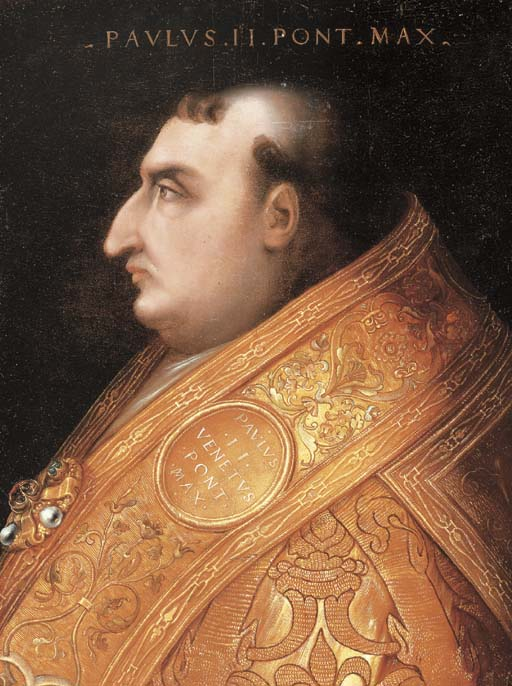

The 1464 papal conclave (28–30 August), convened after the death of Pope Pius II, elected as his successor cardinal Pietro Barbo, who took the name Paul II.

== List of participants ==
Pope Pius II died on 14 August 1464, in Ancona during preparations for the crusade against the Ottoman Empire. At the time of his death, there were 29 living cardinals, but only 19 of them participated in the conclave:

Elector	Nationality	Cardinalatial Title	Elevated	Elevator	Notes
Bessarion	Greek	Bishop of Frascati; commendatario of SS. XII Apostoli	1439, December 18	Pope Eugenius IV	Dean of the Sacred College of Cardinals; Latin Patriarch of Constantinople; Cardinal-protector of the Orders of Basilians, Franciscans and Dominicans
Guillaume d'Estouteville, O.S.B.Cluny	French	Bishop of Ostia e Velletri	1439, December 18	Pope Eugenius IV	Archbishop of Rouen and administrator of Saint-Jean-de-Maurienne; Archpriest of the patriarchal Liberian Basilica; Cardinal-protector of the Order of Augustinians
Juan de Torquemada, O.P.	Castilian	Bishop of Sabina	1439, December 18	Pope Eugenius IV	Bishop of Ourense
Juan Carvajal	Castilian	Bishop of Porto e Santa Rufina; commendatario of S. Lucia in Septisolio	1446, December 16	Pope Eugenius IV	Bishop of Plasencia; Cardinal-protector of Hungary
Ludovico Trevisan	Venetian	Priest of S. Lorenzo in Damaso	1440, July 1	Pope Eugenius IV	Camerlengo of the Holy Roman Church; Patriarch of Aquileia; bishop of Cava
Pietro Barbo (elected Pope Paul II)	Venetian	Priest of S. Marco	1440, July 1	Pope Eugenius IV (Cardinal-nephew)	Bishop of Vicenza; Archpriest of the patriarchal Vatican Basilica
Latino Orsini	Roman	Priest of SS. Giovanni e Paolo	1448, December 20	Pope Nicholas V	Administrator of Bari; Archpriest of the patriarchal Lateran Basilica
Alain de Coëtivy	French	Priest of S. Prassede	1448, December 20	Pope Nicholas V	Bishop of Avignon and administrator of Dol
Filippo Calandrini	Bolognese	Priest of S. Lorenzo in Lucina	1448, December 20	Pope Nicholas V (Cardinal-nephew)	Grand penitentiary; Bishop of Bologna
Juan de Mella	Castilian	Priest of S. Prisca	1456, December 17	Pope Callixtus III	Bishop of Zamora
Giacomo Tebaldi	Neapolitan	Priest of S. Anastasia	1456, December 17	Pope Callixtus III	
Richard Olivier de Longueil	French	Priest of S. Eusebio	1456, December 17	Pope Callixtus III	Bishop of Coutances
Angelo Capranica	Roman	Priest of S. Croce in Gerusalemme	1460, March 5	Pope Pius II	Bishop of Rieti
Bartolomeo Roverella	Ferrara	Priest of S. Clemente	1461, December 18	Pope Pius II	Archbishop of Ravenna; Governor of Benevento
Louis d'Albret	French	Priest of SS. Marcellino e Pietro	1461, December 18	Pope Pius II	Bishop of Cahors
Giacomo Ammanati-Piccolomini	Siena	Priest of S. Crisogono	1461, December 18	Pope Pius II (Cardinal-nephew)	Bishop of Pavia; Camerlengo of the Sacred College of Cardinals
Rodrigo Borgia	Valencian	Deacon of S. Nicola in Carcere Tulliano; commendatario of S. Maria in Via Lata	1456, September 17	Pope Callixtus III (Cardinal-nephew)	Protodeacon of the Sacred College of Cardinals; Vice-Chancellor of the Holy Roman Church; Administrator of Valencia
Francesco Todeschini-Piccolomini	Siena	Deacon of S. Eustachio	1460, March 5	Pope Pius II (Cardinal-nephew)	Administrator of Siena; Legate in Rome and the Papal States
Francesco Gonzaga	Mantua	Deacon of S. Maria Nuova	1461, December 18	Pope Pius II	Bishop of Brixen

Ten electors were Italian, four Spaniards, four French and one Greek. Six were created by Pius II, six by Eugenius IV, four by Callixtus III and three by Nicholas V.

== Absentees ==
Ten cardinals (over 1/3 of the whole Sacred College) did not participate in this conclave:

Elector	Nationality	Cardinalatial Title	Elevated	Elevator	Notes
Pierre de Foix, O.F.M.	French	Bishop of Albano	September, 1414	Antipope John XXIII	Legate in Avignon; administrator of Lescar and Tarbes
Petrus von Schaumberg	German	Priest of S. Vitale	1439, December 18	Pope Eugenius IV	Protopriest of the Sacred College of Cardinals; Bishop of Augsburg
Dénes Szécsi	Hungarian	Priest of S. Ciriaco	1439, December 18	Pope Eugenius IV	Archbishop of Esztergom; Chancellor of the Kingdom of Hungary
Jean Rolin	French	Priest of S. Stefano al Monte Celio	1448, December 20	Pope Nicholas V	Bishop of Autun
Luis Juan del Mila y Borja	Valencian	Priest of SS. IV Coronati	1456, September 17	Pope Callixtus III (Cardinal-nephew)	Bishop of Lerida
Berardo Eroli	Narni	Priest of S. Sabina	1460, March 5	Pope Pius II	Bishop of Spoleto; legate a latere in Perugia
Niccolò Fortiguerra	Pistoia	Priest of S. Cecilia	1460, March 5	Pope Pius II (Cardinal-nephew)	Bishop of Teano; Supreme Commander of Papal Fleet
Burchard of Weissbruch	German	Priest of SS. Nereo ed Achilleo	1460, March 5	Pope Pius II	Archbishop of Salzburg
Jean Jouffroy, O.S.B.Cluny	French	Priest of SS. Silvestro e Martino ai Monti	1461, December 18	Pope Pius II	Bishop of Albi
Jaime Cardona	Catalan	Priest [no title assigned]	1461, December 18	Pope Pius II	Bishop of Urgel

Of the absentee cardinals five were created by Pius II, two by Eugenius IV, one by Callixtus III and one by Nicholas V. Pierre de Foix was the last surviving cardinal of the Great Western Schism and was elevated by Pisan Antipope John XXIII.

Among them there were three French, two Italians, two Germans, two Spaniards and the one Hungarian.

== Candidates to the papacy ==
Bessarion, d'Estouteville, Trevisan, Carvajal, Torquemada and Barbo were mentioned as main papabili in the contemporary reports of the ambassadors and envoys of Italian Princes. Also Calandrini, Roverella and Capranica were referred to as possible candidates.

== The election of Pope Paul II ==
On the evening of August 28 all cardinals present in Rome entered the conclave in the Vatican, with the exception of ill Cardinal Torquemada, who joined the rest on the following day.

Initially, in order to secure to the cardinals a greater share of power than they had enjoyed under Pius II, a capitulation was prepared the conclave capitulation, and all except Ludovico Trevisan subscribed to it. The terms of the capitulation were the following:

- continue the Crusades against the Ottoman Empire
- leave Rome only with the consent of the majority of cardinals; the Italian Peninsula with the consent of all
- college of Cardinals limited to 24
- new pope limited to one cardinal-nephew
- creation of cardinals or advancement of benefices required the consent of the college.

The first scrutiny took place on August 30. Cardinal Pietro Barbo received eleven votes, while the remaining fell to Trevisan and d'Estouteville. On the following accessus Barbo received three additional votes and was elected Pope. He took the name Paul II, and a little bit later protodeacon Rodrigo Borgia announced the election to the people of Rome with the ancient formula Habemus Papam. On September 6 the new pope was solemnly crowned on the steps of the patriarchal Vatican Basilica by Cardinal Niccolò Fortiguerra, priest of the title of S. Cecilia.

== Sources ==
- Ludwig von Pastor: "History of the popes vol. 4", London 1900
- Miranda, Salvador. "Conclave of August 27 - 30, 1464 (Paul II)". The Cardinals of the Holy Roman Church. Florida International University. OCLC 53276621.
- Miranda, Salvador; Burkle-Young, Francis A. "Papal elections in the Fifteenth Century: the election of Paul II". The Cardinals of the Holy Roman Church. Florida International University. OCLC 53276621.
