= 1471 conclave =

Election of Catholic Pope Sixtus IV

Papal conclave August 1471

Dates and location
- 6–9 August 1471; Apostolic Palace, Papal States

Key officials
- Dean: Basilios Bessarion
- Protopriest: Jean Rolin
- Protodeacon: Roderic de Borja

Elected pope
- Francesco della Rovere; Name taken: Sixtus IV
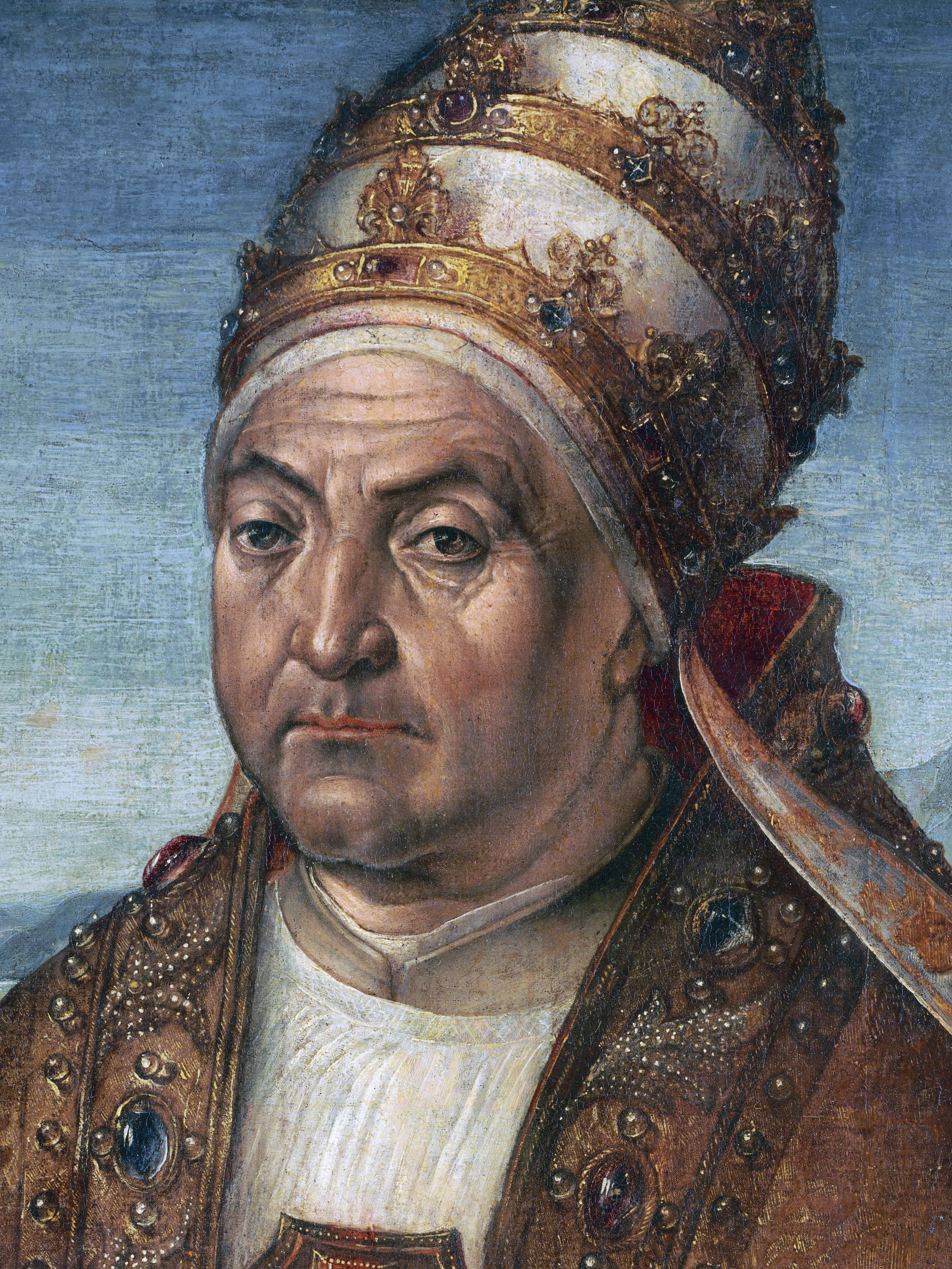

The 1471 papal conclave (6–9 August) elected Pope Sixtus IV following the death of Pope Paul II. With the exception of the conclaves of the Western Schism, this conclave was the first since 1305 to feature a working, two-thirds majority of Italians within the College of Cardinals, in no small part because of the absence of six non-Italian cardinals. This was in part due to the unexpectedness of the death of Paul II.

== The election ==
The two main factions were those of d'Estouteville and Orsini, the latter of whom secured a major pre-conclave victory in managing to persuade the rest of the College to exclude the cardinals created by Paul II in pectore, in explicit defiance of the last will and testament of the previous pontiff. Such creatures would be allowed to participate, for example, in the papal conclave, 1492. Paul II had created at least eight cardinals in secret, at least five of whom were alive at the time of the conclave: Pedro Ferriz, Pietro Foscari, Giovanni Battista Savelli, Ferry de Clugny, and Jan Vitez.

A conclave capitulation was drawn up at the beginning of the conclave, but unusually it contained no explicit limitations on papal power, except to continue the Crusading war against the Turks. The aforementioned factions can more specifically be referred to as the "Pieschi" (primarily the creations of Pius II) and the "Paoleschi" (primarily the creations of Paul II).

As in the immediately previous conclaves, Bessarion emerged as an early favorite, with six votes on the second day, those of: d'Estouteville, Calandrini, Capranica, Ammanati-Piccolomini, Caraffa, and Barbo; d'Estouteville trailed with the votes of Bessarion, Gonzaga, and Monferrato as did Forteguerri with the votes of Orsini, Eruli, and Agnifilo; Orsini got nods from della Rovere and Michiel; Roverella from Borgia and Zeno; Eruli from Forteguerri; and Calandrini from Roverella. The old arguments against Bessarion, namely that he was a non-Italian, who in addition would be unacceptable to the princes of France, again prevailed.

The voting tallies are known with specificity because of the notes of Nicodemo de Pontremoli, sent to Duke of Milan Galeazzo Maria Sforza, currently residing in the State Archives of Milan. Notable favorites in the ensuing scrutinies are (chronologically): Calandrini, Forteguerri, and Roverella.

Of the favored candidates of Sforza, della Rovere was the most electable, so Gonzaga and Borja lobbied for him behind the scenes, all the while disguising their intentions by voting for others until the morning of August 9, when along with d'Estouteville and Barbo they changed their votes to della Rovere in the accessus, giving him a total of 13 votes. The cardinals voting for della Rovere in the scrutiny were: Monferrato, Zeno, Michiel, Agnifilo, Roverella, Forteguerri, Bessarion, Calandrini, and Orsini. Contrary to the perennial tradition, the five remaining cardinals did not change their votes to della Rovere in the accessus to make the election "unanimous".

== Cardinal electors ==
Elector	Nationality	Order	Title	Elevated	Elevator	Notes
Basilios Bessarion	Greek	Cardinal-bishop	Bishop of Sabina	18 December 1439	Eugenius IV	Dean of the College of Cardinals; Latin Patriarch of Constantinople; archbishop of Nicea and Tebe
Guillaume d'Estouteville, O.S.B.Clun.	French	Cardinal-bishop	Bishop of Ostia e Velletri	18 December 1439	Eugenius IV	Archbishop of Rouen and Saint-Jean-de-Maurienne; archpriest of the Liberian Basilica
Latino Orsini	Roman	Cardinal-bishop	Bishop of Frascati	20 December 1448	Nicholas V	Administrator of the sees of Bari and Polignano; archpriest of Lateran Basilica
Filippo Calandrini	Ligurian	Cardinal-bishop	Bishop of Albano	20 December 1448	Nicholas V	Cardinal-nephew; bishop of Bologna; grand penitentiary; camerlengo of the Sacred College of Cardinals
Angelo Capranica	Roman	Cardinal-priest	Title of S. Croce in Gerusalemme	5 March 1460	Pius II	
Berardo Eroli	Umbrian	Cardinal-priest	Title of S. Sabina	5 March 1460	Pius II	Bishop of Spoleto
Niccolò Fortiguerra	Tuscan	Cardinal-priest	Title of S. Cecilia	5 March 1460	Pius II	Bishop of Teano
Bartolomeo Roverella	Adria, Republic of Venice	Cardinal-priest	Title of S. Clemente	18 December 1461	Pius II	Archbishop of Ravenna
Jacopo Piccolomini-Ammannati	Tuscan	Cardinal-priest	Title of S. Crisogono	18 December 1461	Pius II	Bishop of Pavia; arrived on August 7
Oliviero Carafa	Neapolitan	Cardinal-priest	Title of S. Eusebio	18 September 1467	Paul II	Archbishop of Naples
Amico Agnifilo	Abruzzese	Cardinal-priest	Title of S. Maria in Trastevere	18 September 1467	Paul II	Bishop of Aquila
Marco Barbo	Venetian	Cardinal-priest	Title of S. Marco	18 September 1467	Paul II	Cardinal-nephew, patriarch of Aquileia
Francesco della Rovere, O.F.M.Conv.	Ligurian	Cardinal-priest	Title of S. Pietro in Vincoli	18 September 1467	Paul II	Elected Pope Sixtus IV
Rodrigo Borja	Catalan	Cardinal-deacon	Deaconry of S. Nicola in Carcere Tulliano	20 February 1456	Callixtus III	Future Pope Alexander VI; cardinal-nephew; administrator of Valencia; vicechancellor of the Holy Roman Church; protodeacon
Francesco Gonzaga	Mantuan	Cardinal-deacon	Deaconry of S. Maria Nuova	18 December 1461	Pius II	Administrator of the sees of Mantua and Brixen
Teodoro Paleologo di Monteferrato	Monteferrato	Cardinal-deacon	Deaconry of S. Teodoro	18 December 1461	Pius II	
Giovanni Battista Zeno	Venetian	Cardinal-deacon	Deaconry of S. Maria in Portico	21 November 1468	Paul II	Cardinal-nephew; bishop of Vicenza; archpriest of the Vatican Basilica
Giovanni Michiel	Venetian	Cardinal-deacon	Deaconry of S. Angelo in Pescheria	21 November 1468	Paul II	Cardinal-nephew; bishop of Verona

=== Absentee cardinals ===
Elector	Nationality	Order	Title	Elevated	Elevator	Notes
Alain de Coëtivy	French	Cardinal-bishop	Bishop of Palestrina	20 December 1448	Nicholas V	Bishop of Avignon and Dol-de-Bretagne
Jean Rolin	French	Cardinal-priest	Title of S. Stefano al Monte Celio	20 December 1448	Nicholas V	Bishop of Autun; protopriest
Luis Juan del Milà	Catalan	Cardinal-priest	Title of Ss. IV Coronati	20 February 1456	Callixtus III	Cardinal-nephew; bishop of Lérida
Jean Jouffroy, O.S.B.Clun.	French	Cardinal-priest	Title of Ss. Silvestro e Martino	18 December 1461	Pius II	Bishop of Albi
Thomas Bourchier	English	Cardinal-priest	Title of S. Ciriaco	18 September 1467	Paul II	Archbishop of Canterbury
Jean Balue	French	Cardinal-priest	Title of S. Susanna	18 September 1467	Paul II	Bishop of Angers
Francesco Todeschini-Piccolomini	Sienese	Cardinal-deacon	Deacon of S. Eustachio	5 March 1460	Pius II	Future Pope Pius III, administrator of the see of Siena, papal legate in Germany
