= List of camerlengos of the Sacred College of Cardinals =

The Camerlengo of the Sacred College of Cardinals was the treasurer of the College of Cardinals in the Catholic Church. The title is based on an Italian word for chamberlain, a word no longer used in secular contexts. The position existed from at least 1272 until 1997, when it was allowed to lapse.

The Camerlengo administered all property, fees, funds and revenue belonging to the College of Cardinals, celebrated the requiem Mass for a deceased cardinal and was charged with the registry of the Acta Consistoralia.

It is believed that the post was created by Pope Eugene III in 1150, but there is no documentary proof of its existence before the pontificate of Pope Innocent III, or perhaps even before the year 1272.

== List of Camerlengos of the Sacred College of Cardinals ==
=== 1198 to 1439 ===
- Cencio Savelli (1198–1216)
- (1217–1271 – no information found)
- Guillaume de Bray (1272–1282)
- (1283–1287 no information found)
- Pietro Peregrosso (1288–1295)
- Hugh Aycelin (1295–1297)
- Robert de Pontigny (1298–1305)
- Jean Lemoine (1305–1310)
- Etienne de Suissy (1310–1311)
- Nicolas de Freauville (1312–1313)
- Berengar Fredol the Younger (1313–1323)
- Guillaume Teste (1323–1326)
- Pierre d'Arrabloy (1326–1331)
- Pedro Gómez de Barroso (1331–1340)
- Imbert du Puy (1340–1348)
- Guillaume Court (1348–1361)
- Hugues Roger (1361–1363)
- Guillaume Aigrefeuille (seniore) (1363–1369)
- Guillaume Aigrefeuille (iuniore) (from 1369)

- Obedient to Rome
  - Niccolò Caracciolo Moschino (1378–1386)
  - Francesco Renzio (1386–1390)
  - Enrico Minutoli (1390–1412)
- Obedient to Avignon
  - Guillaume Aigrefeuille (iuniore) (until 1401)
  - Martín de Zalba (1401–1403)
  - Amedeo Saluzzo (1403–1409)

- Amedeo Saluzzo (1409–1419)
- Francesco Lando (1419–1427)
- Antonio Panciera (1428–1431)
- Lucido Conti (1431–1437)
- Angelotto Fosco (1437)
- Domenico Capranica (1438)
- Prospero Colonna (1439)

=== 1440 to 1499 ===
- Guillaume d'Estouteville (1440)
- Basilios Bessarion (1441)
- Niccolo d'Acciapaccio (1442)
- Giovanni Berardi (1443)
- Albert d'Albret (1444)
- Pietro Barbo (1445–1446)
- Juan de Torquemada (1446)
- Giorgio Fieschi (1447)
- Domenico Capranica (1448)
- Astorgo Agnensi (1449)
- Isidore of Kiev (1450)
- Latino Orsini (1451)
- Guillaume d'Estaing (1452)
- Alain de Coëtivy (1453)
- Filippo Calandrini (1454–1455)
- Antonio de la Cerda (1456)
- Enea Silvio Piccolomini (1457–1458)
- Giacomo Tebaldi (1458)
- Juan de Mella (1459)
- Pietro Barbo (1460)
- Alessandro Oliva (1461)
- Niccolò Fortiguerra (1462)
- Jacopo Piccolomini-Ammannati (1462)
- Nicholas of Cusa (1463)
- Jacopo Piccolomini-Ammannati (1464)
- Louis d'Albret (1465)
- Guillaume d'Estouteville (1465)
- Berardo Eroli (1466)
- Basilios Bessarion (1467)
- Guillaume d'Estouteville (1468)
- Juan de Carvajal (1469)
- Latino Orsini (1469–1471)
- Filippo Calandrini (1471)
- Rodrigo Borgia (1472) – later Pope Alexander VI
- Guillaume d'Estouteville (1472–1473)
- Berardo Eroli (1474)
- Bartolomeo Roverella (1475)
- Jacopo Piccolomini-Ammannati (1476)
- Oliviero Carafa (1477)
- Marco Barbo (1478)
- Giuliano della Rovere (1479) – later Pope Julius II
- Giovanni Battista Zeno (1480)
- Stefano Nardini (1481)
- Ausiàs Despuig (1482)
- Giovanni Arcimboldi (1483)
- Giovanni Battista Cibo (1484)
- Giovanni Michiel (1484–1485)
- Jorge da Costa (1486)
- (1487–1491, no information available)
- Lorenzo Cybo de Mari (1492)
- Antonio Pallavicini Gentili (1493)
- (1494, no information available)
- Giambattista Orsini (1495)
- (1496–1497, no information available)
- Bernardino López de Carvajal (1498)
- Bartolomeo Martini (1499)

=== 1500 to 1600 ===
- (1500, no information available)
- Juan López (1501)
- (1502, no information available)
- Francisco de Borja (1503)
- Juan de Vera (1504)
- Antonio Trivulzio (1505)
- Gianstefano Ferrero (1506)
- (1507–1508, no information available)
- François Guillaume de Castelnau-Clermont-Lodève (1509)
- (1510–1511, no information available)
- Robert Guibé (1512)
- Leonardo Grosso della Rovere (1512–1513)
- Robert Guibé (1513)
- (1514–1515, no information available)
- Antonio Maria Ciocchi del Monte (1516)
- Achille Grassi (1517–1518)
- Lorenzo Pucci (1518–1519)
- Giulio de Medici (1519–1520)
- Francesco de Conti (1520–1521)
- Giovanni Piccolomini (1521–1523)
- Giovanni Domenico de Cupis (1523–1524)
- Andrea della Valle (1524–1526)
- Scaramuccia Trivulzio (1526–1527)
- Domenico Giacobazzi (1527–1528)
- Willem van Enckevoirt (1529)
- Antonio Sanseverino (1530–1531)
- Benedetto Accolti (1531)
- Agostino Spinola (1532–1533)
- Gianvincenzo Carafa (1533–1534)
- Andrea Matteo Palmieri (1534–1535)
- Francisco de Quiñones (1535)
- Francesco Cornaro (1536–1537)
- Antonio Pucci (1537–1538)
- Girolamo Ghinucci (1538–1539)
- Giacomo Simoneta (1539–1540)
- Gasparo Contarini (1540–1541)
- Gianpietro Carafa (1541–1542)
- Rodolfo Pio da Carpi (1542)
- Pietro Bembo (1542–1543)
- Juan Alvares de Toledo (1543–1544)
- Pierpaolo Parisio (1544–1545)
- Marcello Cervini (1545)
- Uberto Gambara (1545–1546)
- Ascanio Parisani (1546–1547)
- Bartolomeo Guidiccioni (1547–1548)
- Miguel da Silva (1548–1549)
- Giovanni Girolamo Morone (1549–1551)
- Marcello Crescenzi (1551–1552)
- Francisco Mendoza de Bobadilla (1552–1553)
- Otto Truchsess von Waldburg (1553–1554)
- Bartolomé de la Cueva y Toledo (1554–1555)
- Federico Cesi (1555–1556)
- Pedro Pacheco (1556–1558)
- Giovanni Angelo Medici (1557–1558)
- Tiberio Crispo (1559–1561)
- Fulvio Cornea (1561–1562)
- Giovanni Michele Saraceni (1562–1563)
- Giovanni Ricci (1563–1564)
- Giovanni Battista Cicala (1564–1565)
- Scipione Rebiba (1565–1567)
- Gianantonio Capizucchi (1567–1568)
- Giacomo Savelli (1568–1569)
- Luigi Cornaro (1569–1570)
- Philibert Babou de la Bourdaisière (1570)
- Antoine Perrenot de Granvelle (1570–1571)
- Stanislaus Hosius (1571–1572)
- Francisco Pacheco de Toledo (1572–1574)
- Giovanni Francesco Gambara (1574–1575)
- Charles Borromeo (1575–1576)
- Alfonso Gesualdo (1576–1577)
- Niccolò Caetani (1577–1578)
- Innico d'Avalos d'Aragona (1578–1579)
- Marcantonio Colonna (1579–1580)
- Tolomeo Gallio (1580–1581)
- Prospero Santacroce (1581–1582)
- Zaccaria Delfino (1582–1583)
- Giovanni Francesco Commendone (1583–1584)
- Gugliemo Sirleto (1584–1585)
- Michele Bonelli (1585–1587)
- Ludovico Madruzzo (1587–1588)
- Nicolas de Pellevé (1588–1589)
- Giulio Antonio Santori (1589–1590)
- Girolamo Rusticucci (1590–1593)
- (1593–1594, no information available)
- Giovanni Evangelista Pallotta (1595–1596)
- Agostino Valieri (1596–1597)
- (1597–1598, no information available)
- Domenico Pinelli, seniore (1599–1600)

=== 1600 to 1700 ===
- (1601–1604, no information available)
- Gregorio Petrocchini, OESA (1605–1607)
- Paolo Emilio Sfondrati (1607–1608)
- Ottavio Paravicini (1608–1609)
- Ottavio Acquaviva d'Aragona (seniore) (1609–1610)
- Flaminio Piatti (1610–1611)
- Pietro Aldobrandini (1611–1612)
- Ottavio Bandini (1612–1613)
- Bartolomeo Cesi (1613–1614)
- Francesco Mantica (1614)
- Bonifazio Bevilacqua Aldobrandini (1614–1616)
- Domenico Toschi (1616–1617)
- Roberto Bellarmino (1617–1618)
- Domenico Ginnasi (1618–1619)
- Giovanni Delfino (1619–1620)
- Giacomo Sannesio (1620–1621)
- Scipione Caffarelli-Borghese (1621–1623)
- Maffeo Barberini (1623), (Elected Pope Urban VIII on 6 August 1623)
- Giovanni Garzia Mellini (1623–1625)
- Marcello Lante della Rovere (1625–1626)
- Gianbattista Leni (1626–1627)
- Gaspar Borja y Velasco (1627–1628)
- Roberto Ubaldini (1628–1629)
- Tiberio Muti (1629–1630)
- Giulio Savelli (1630–1631)
- Guido Bentivoglio d'Aragona (1631–1632)
- Antonio Marcello Barberini (Antonio the Elder), OFMCap. (1632)
- Desiderio Scaglia, OP (1632–1633)
- Agostino Spinola Basadone (1633–1634)
- Cosimo de Torres (1634–1635)
- Alfonso de la Cueva-Benavides y Mendoza-Carrillo (1635–1636)
- Antonio Marcello Barberini (Antonio the Elder), OFMCap (1636–1637)
- Luigi Caetani (1637–1638)
- Bernardino Spada (1638–1639)
- Berlinghiero Gessi (1639)
- Federico Baldissera Bartolomeo Cornaro (1639–1641)
- Giulio Cesare Sacchetti (1641–1642)
- Giandomenico Spinola (1642–1643)
- Giovanni Battista Pamphili (1643–1644), (Elected Pope Innocent X on 15 September 1644)
- Gil Carrillo de Albornoz (1644–1646)
- Ciriaco Rocci (1646–1647)
- Giovanni Battista Maria Pallotta (1647–1648)
- Ulderico Carpegna (1648–1649)
- Marco Antonio Franciotti (1649–1650)
- Marcantonio Bragadin (1650–1651)
- Pier Donato Cesi (1651–1652)
- Vincenzo Maculani, OP (1652–1653)
- Francesco Peretti di Montalto (1653–1654)
- Carlo Rossetti (1654–1656)
- Francesco Angelo Rapaccioli (1656–1657)
- Juan de Lugo y de Quiroga, SJ (1657–1658)
- Niccolò Albergati-Ludovisi (1658–1659)
- Federico Sforza (1659–1660)
- Benedetto Odescalchi (1660–1661)
- Camillo Astalli-Pamphili (1661–1662)
- Luigi Omodei (1662–1663)
- Giacomo Corradi (1663–1664)
- Giberto III Borromeo (1664–1665)
- Marcello Santacroce (1665–1666)
- Giambattista Spada (1666–1668)
- Francesco Albizzi (1668–1669)
- Ottavio Aquaviva d'Aragona (1669–1671)
- Carlo Pio di Savoia, iuniore (1671–1672)
- Carlo Gualterio (1672–1673)
- Flavio Chigi (1673–1674)
- Giacomo Franzoni (1674–1675)
- Pietro Vidoni, seniore (1675–1676)
- Carlo Carafa della Spina (1676–1678)
- Paluzzo Paluzzi Altieri degli Albertoni (1678–1679)
- Giacomo Filippo Nini (1679–1680)
- Giacomo Rospigliosi (1680–1681)
- Gasparo Carpegna (1681–1682)
- César d'Estrées (1682–1683)
- Federico Baldeschi Colonna (1683–1684)
- Francesco Nerli (iuniore) (1684–1685)
- Girolamo Gastaldi (1685)
- Alessandro Crescenzi (cardinal), CRS (1685–1687)
- Galeazzo Marescotti (1687–1688)
- Fabrizio Spada (1688–1689)
- Philip Thomas Howard of Norfolk, OP (1689–1691)
- Giambattista Spinola, seniore (1691–1692)
- Savo Millini (1692–1693)
- Francesco Lorenzo Brancati di Lauria, OFMConv (1693)
- Pier Matteo Petrucci (1693–1695)
- Jan Kazimierz Denhoff (1695–1696)
- Leandro Colloredo, Orat. (1696–1697)
- Domenico Maria Corsi (1697)
- 1698–1699 (No name given in Acta Camerari Sacri Collegii S. R. E. Cardinalium)
- Bandino Panciatici (1699–1700)

=== 1700 to 1801 ===
- Giacomo Cantelmo (1700–1702)
- Toussaint de Forbin-Janson, (1702–1703)
- Giambattista Rubini (1703–1704)
- Tommaso Maria Ferrari, OP (1704–1705)
- Giuseppe Sacripante (1705–1706)
- Fabrizio Paolucci (1706–1707)
- Andrea Santacroce (1707–1708)
- Sperello Sperelli (1708–1709)
- Giovanni Maria Gabrielli, OCist (1709–1710)
- Lorenzo Corsini (1710–1711)
- Francesco Acquaviva d'Aragonia (1711–1712)
- Filippo Antonio Gualterio (1712–1713)
- Giandomenico Paracciani (1713–1714)
- Joseph-Emmanuel de La Trémoille (1714–1715)
- Carlo Agostino Fabroni (1715–1716)
- Michelangelo dei Conti (1716–1717)
- Lodovico Pico della Mirandola (1717–1718)
- Antonio Felice Zondadari (1718–1719)
- Pietro Marcellino Corradini (1719–1720)
- Luigi Priuli (1720)
- Giovanni Battista Tolomei, SJ (1720–1723)
- Bernardino Scotti (1723–1724)
- Nicola Gaetano Spinola (1724–1726)
- Giorgio Spinola (1726–1727)
- Cornelio Bentivoglio (1727–1728)
- Luis Antonio Belluga y Moncada (1728–1729)
- Michael Friedrich von Althann (1729–1730)
- Álvaro Cienfuegos Villazón, SJ (1730–1732)
- Giambattista Altieri, iuniore (1732–1733)
- Vincenzo Petra (1733–1734)
- Niccolò Maria Lercari (1734–1735)
- Vincenzo Ludovico Gotti (1735–1736)
- Leandro Porzia (1736–1737)
- Pierluigi Carafa (1737–1738)
- Francesco Scipione Maria Borghese (1738–1739)
- Vincenzo Bichi (1739–1741)
- Giuseppe Firrao (1741–1742)
- Antonio Saverio Gentili (1742–1743)
- Giovanni Antonio Guadagni, OCD (1743–1744)
- Troiano Acquaviva d’Aragona (1744–1745)
- Domenico Riviera (1745–1746)
- Giovanni Battista Spínola (1746–1747)
- Raniero D'Elci (1747–1748)
- Domenico Silvio Passionei (1748–1749)
- Silvio Valenti Gonzaga (1749–1750)
- Joaquín Fernández de Portocarrero (1750–1751)
- Camillo Paolucci (1751–1752)
- Carlo Alberto Guidoboni Cavalchini (1752–1753)
- Federico Marcello Lante Montefeltro della Rovere (1753–1754)
- Francesco Landi (1754–1755)
- Fortunato Tamburini, OSBCas (1755–1756)
- Girolamo de Bardi (1756–1757)
- Giovanni Battista Mesmer (1757–1758)
- Henry Benedict Mary Clement Stuart of York (1758–1760)
- Giuseppe Maria Feroni (1760–1761)
- Luca Melchiore Tempi (1761–1762)
- Cosimo Imperiali (1762–1763)
- Antonio Andrea Galli, CRSsS (1763–1764)
- Carlo Rezzonico (1764–1765)
- Ferdinando Maria de Rossi (1765–1766)
- Giuseppe Maria Castelli (1766–1767)
- Gaetano Fantuzzi (1767–1768)
- Pietro Girolamo Guglielmi (1768–1770)
- Marcantonio Colonna (1770–1771)
- Andrea Corsini (1771–1772)
- Simone Buonaccorsi (1772–1773)
- Giovanni Carlo Boschi (1773–1774)
- Ludovico Calini (1774–1776)
- Lazzaro Opizio Pallavicino (1776–1777)
- Pietro Pamphilj (1777–1778)
- Mario Marefoschi Compagnoni (1778–1779)
- Scipione Borghese (1779–1780)
- Antonio Eugenio Visconti (1780–1781)
- Bernardino Giraud (1781–1782)
- Innocenzo Conti (1782–1783)
- Francesco Saverio de Zelada (1783–1784)
- Leonardo Antonelli (1784–1785)
- Giovanni Archinto (1785–1786)
- Giacinto Sigismondo Gerdil, B. (1786–1787)
- Guglielmo Pallotta (1787–1788)
- Franziskus Herzan von Harras (1788–1789)
- Giovanni De Gregorio (1789–1790)
- Francesco Carrara (1790–1791)
- Ignazio Busca (1791–1792)
- Stefano Borgia (1792–1793)
- Tommaso Antici (1793–1794)
- Giovanni Battista Caprara (1794–1795)
- Antonio Dugnani (1795–1796)
- Aurelio Roverella (1796–1797)
- Giulio Maria della Somaglia (1797–1798)
- Vincenzo Maria Altieri (1798) (1)
- Giulio Maria della Somaglia (1799–1801) (2)

=== 1801 to 1900 ===
- Diego Innico Caracciolo di Martina (1801–1802)
- Giuseppe Firrao, Jr. (1802–1803)
- Ferdinando Maria Saluzzo (1803–1804)
- Bartolomeo Pacca (1804–1805)
- Giovanni Filippo Gallarati Scotti (1805–1806)
- Lorenzo Litta (1806–1807)
- Filippo Casoni (1807–1808)
- Girolamo della Porta (1808–1809)
- Valentino Mastrozzi (1809–1810)
- Antonio Despuig y Dameto (1810–1813)
- Pietro Francesco Galleffi (1814–1818)
- Antonio Doria Pamphili (1818–1819)
- Fabrizio Dionigi Ruffo (1819–1820)
- Ercole Consalvi (1820–1821)
- Giuseppe Albani (1821–1822)
- Francesco Guidobono Cavalchini (1822–1823)
- Giovanni Caccia-Piatti (1823–1825)
- Pietro Vidoni (1825–1826)
- Cesare Guerrieri Gonzaga (1826–1827)
- Antonio Maria Frosini (1827–1828)
- Tommaso Riario Sforza (1828–1830)
- Belisario Cristaldi (1830–1831)
- Juan Francisco Marco y Catalán (1831–1832)
- Domenico de Simone (1832–1833)
- Ludovico Gazzoli (1833–1834)
- Mario Mattei (1834–1835)
- Nicola Grimaldi (1835–1836)
- Alessandro Spada (1836–1837)
- Bartolomeo Pacca (1837–1838)
- Emmanuele de Gregorio (1838–1839)
- Giovanni Francesco Falzacappa (1839–1840)
- Carlo Maria Pedicini (1840–1841)
- Antonio Domenico Gamberini (1841–1842)
- Giacomo Giustiniani (1842–1843)
- Vincenzo Macchi (1843–1844)
- Luigi Lambruschini, CRSP (1844–1845)
- Pietro Ostini (1845–1846)
- Castruccio Castracane degli Antelminelli (1846–1847)
- Mario Mattei (1848–1850)
- Giacomo Luigi Brignole (1851–1852)
- Costantino Patrizi (1852–1853)
- Luigi Amat di San Filippo e Sorso (1853–1854)
- Gabriele Ferretti (1854–1855)
- Antonio Maria Cagiano de Azevedo (1855–1856)
- Benedetto Barberini (1856–1857)
- Ugo Pietro Spinola (1857–1858)
- Gabriele della Genga Sermattei (1858–1859)
- Clarissimo Falconieri Mellini (1859)
- Antonio Tosti (1859–1860)
- Gaspare Bernardo Pianetti (1861–1862)
- Fabio Maria Asquini (1862–1863)
- Niccola Paracciani Clarelli (1863–1864)
- Domenico Carafa della Spina di Traetto (1864–1865)
- Sisto Riario Sforza (1865–1866)
- Camillo di Pietro (1866–1867)
- Karl-August von Reisach (1867–1868)
- Alessandro Barnabò (1868–1869)
- Giuseppe Milesi Pironi Ferretti (1869–1870)
- Pietro de Silvestri (1870–1871)
- Angelo Quaglia (1871–1872)
- Antonio Maria Panebianco, OFMConv (1872–1873)
- Antonio Saverio De Luca (1873–1874)
- Giuseppe Andrea Bizzarri (1874–1875)
- Lucien Louis Joseph Napoleon Bonaparte (1876–1877)
- Innocenzo Ferrieri (1877–1879)
- Edoardo Borromeo (1879–1880)
- Raffaele Monaco La Valletta (1880–1881)
- Flavio Chigi (1881–1882)
- Luigi Oreglia di Santo Stefano (1882–1883)
- Tommaso Martinelli, OESA (1883–1884)
- Mieczysław Halka Ledóchowski (1884–1885)
- Giovanni Simeoni (1885–1886)
- Domenico Bartolini (1886–1887)
- Luigi Serafini (1887–1888)
- Lucido Parocchi (1888–1889)
- Carlo Laurenzi (1889)
- Paul Melchers (1889–1891)
- Serafino Vannutelli (1891–1892)
- Gaetano Aloisi Masella (1892–1893)
- Mariano Rampolla del Tindaro (1893–1894)
- Fulco Luigi Ruffo-Scilla (1894–1895)
- Angelo Di Pietro (1895–1896)
- Girolamo Maria Gotti, OCD (1896–1897)
- Domenico Jacobini (1897–1898)
- Antonio Agliardi (1898–1899)
- Domenico Ferrata (1899–1900)

=== 1900 to 1997 ===
- Serafino Cretoni (1900–1901)
- Giovanni Battista Casali del Drago (1901–1902)
- Francesco di Paola Cassetta (1902–1903)
- Alessandro Sanminiatelli Zabarella (1903–1905)
- François-Désiré Mathieu (1905–1906)
- Pietro Respighi (1906–1907)
- Sebastiano Martinelli, OESA ( 1907–1909)
- Casimiro Gennari (1909–1911)
- Rafael Merry del Val (1911–1912)
- Aristide Rinaldini (1912–1914)
- Pietro Gasparri (1914–1915)
- Antonio Vico (1915–1916)
- Gennaro Granito Pignatelli di Belmonte (1916–1919)
- Basilio Pompili (1919–1920)
- Giulio Boschi (1920)
- Rafael Merry del Val (1920–1922)
- 1922–1926 (No information found)
- Donato Sbarretti (1926–?)
- 1926–1929 (No information found)
- Achille Locatelli (1929–1930)
- Luigi Sincero (1930–1931)
- Bonaventura Cerretti (1933)
- Achille Locatelli (1933–1935)
- Luigi Capotosti (1935–1936)
- Lorenzo Lauri (1936–1937)
- Eugenio Pacelli (1937–1939) (elected Pope Pius XII on March 2, 1939)
- 1939–1947 (No information found)
- Federico Tedeschini (1947–1948)
- 1948–1949 (No information found)
- Massimo Massimi (1949–1950)
- Nicola Canali (1950–1951)
- Giovanni Mercati (1951–1952)
- Giuseppe Bruno (1952–1954)
- Alfredo Ottaviani (1954–1958)
- Eugène-Gabriel-Gervais-Laurent Tisserant (1958–1960)
- Clemente Micara (1960–1961)
- Giuseppe Pizzardo (1961–1962)
- Benedetto Aloisi Masella (1962–1968)
- Giuseppe Ferretto (1968–1973)
- Ildebrando Antoniutti (1974)
- Franjo Šeper (1974–1977)
- Agnelo Rossi (1977–1978)
- Gabriel-Marie Garrone (1978–1979)
- Egidio Vagnozzi (1979–1980)
- 1980–1982 (Vacant)
- Maximilien de Furstenberg (1982–1984)
- Silvio Oddi (1984–1987)
- Giuseppe Paupini (1987–1988)
- Johannes Willebrands (1988–1997)

== General and cited references ==
- Cardinals camerlengo of the Sacred College of Cardinals (by S. Miranda)
- Konrad Eubel, Hierarchia Catholica Medii Aevi, vol. I-III, 1913.
- Johann Peter Kirsch, Die Finanzverwaltung des Kardinalkollegiums im XIII. und XIV. Jahrhundert (Münster 1895).
