= Berardo Eroli =

Italian Roman Catholic bishop and cardinal

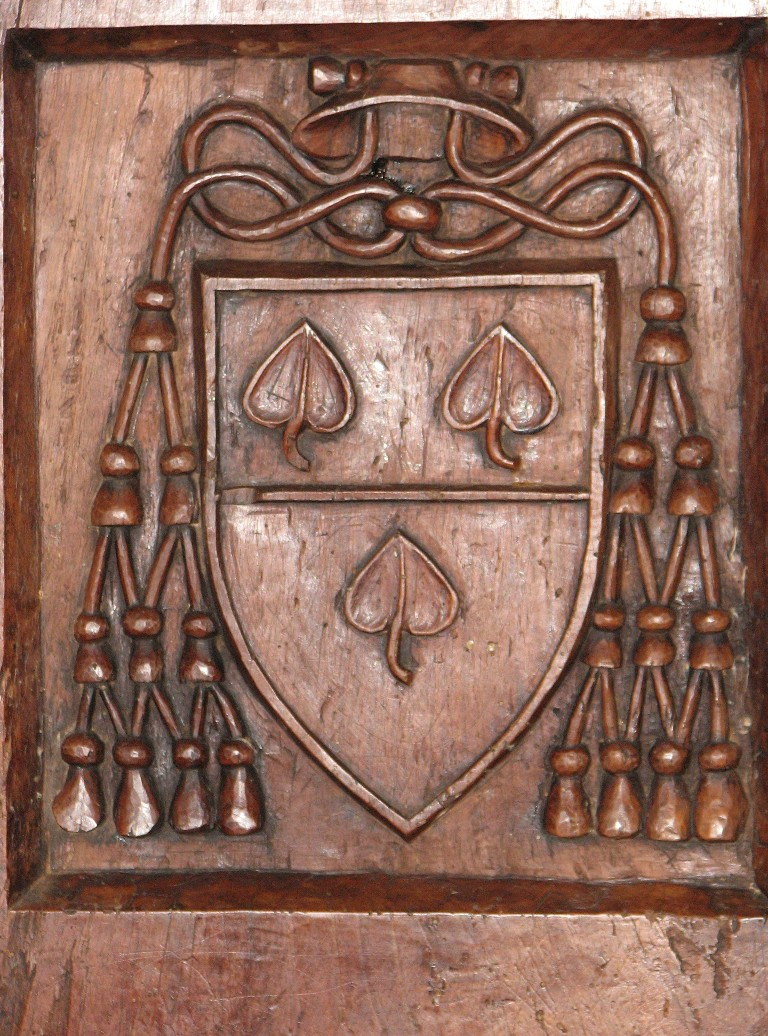
Coat of arms of Cardinal Berardo Eroli

Berardo Eroli (1409–1479) (called the Cardinal of Spoleto) was an Italian Roman Catholic bishop and cardinal.

== Biography ==
Berardo Eroli was born in Narni in 1409. He was from an otherwise obscure family. He studied at Rome, becoming a doctor of both laws.

He was made a Referendary by Pope Nicholas V, who admitted him to the Apostolic Palace. Nicholas later made him auditor of the Roman Rota.

He was elected Bishop of Spoleto on 13 November 1448. He served as Vicar of Rome during the pontificates of Pope Nicholas V and Pope Callixtus III. He later became a regent of the Apostolic Chancellery.

In the consistory celebrated in Siena on 5 March 1460, Pope Pius II made him a cardinal priest. He received the red hat on 8 March 1460 and the titular church of Santa Sabina on 19 March 1460.

He was appointed legate a latere to Perugia, leaving for the city on 27 August 1462. He rejoined Pope Pius II at Terni in June 1464 and accompanied the pope to Ancona. He did not participate in the papal conclave of 1464 that elected Pope Paul II.

In August 1465, Eroli, along with Cardinals Basilios Bessarion and Juan Carvajal was part of a commission sent to the Kingdom of Bohemia to regulate its affairs.

On 3 January 1466 he was elected Camerlengo of the Sacred College of Cardinals. He was reelected to a second term on 24 January 1467.

He participated in the papal conclave of 1471 that elected Pope Sixtus IV. He opted to become a cardinal bishop, receiving the suburbicarian see of Sabina on 23 May 1474. He again served as Vicar of Rome in 1475.

He died in Rome on 2 April 1479. He is buried in St. Peter's Basilica.

Catholic Church titles
Preceded by Guillaume d'Estouteville	Camerlengo of the Sacred College of Cardinals; 1466	Succeeded by Basilios Bessarion
Preceded by Guillaume d'Estouteville	Camerlengo of the Sacred College of Cardinals; 1474	Succeeded by Bartolomeo Roverella
