= Bartolomeo Roverella =

Italian bishop and cardinal

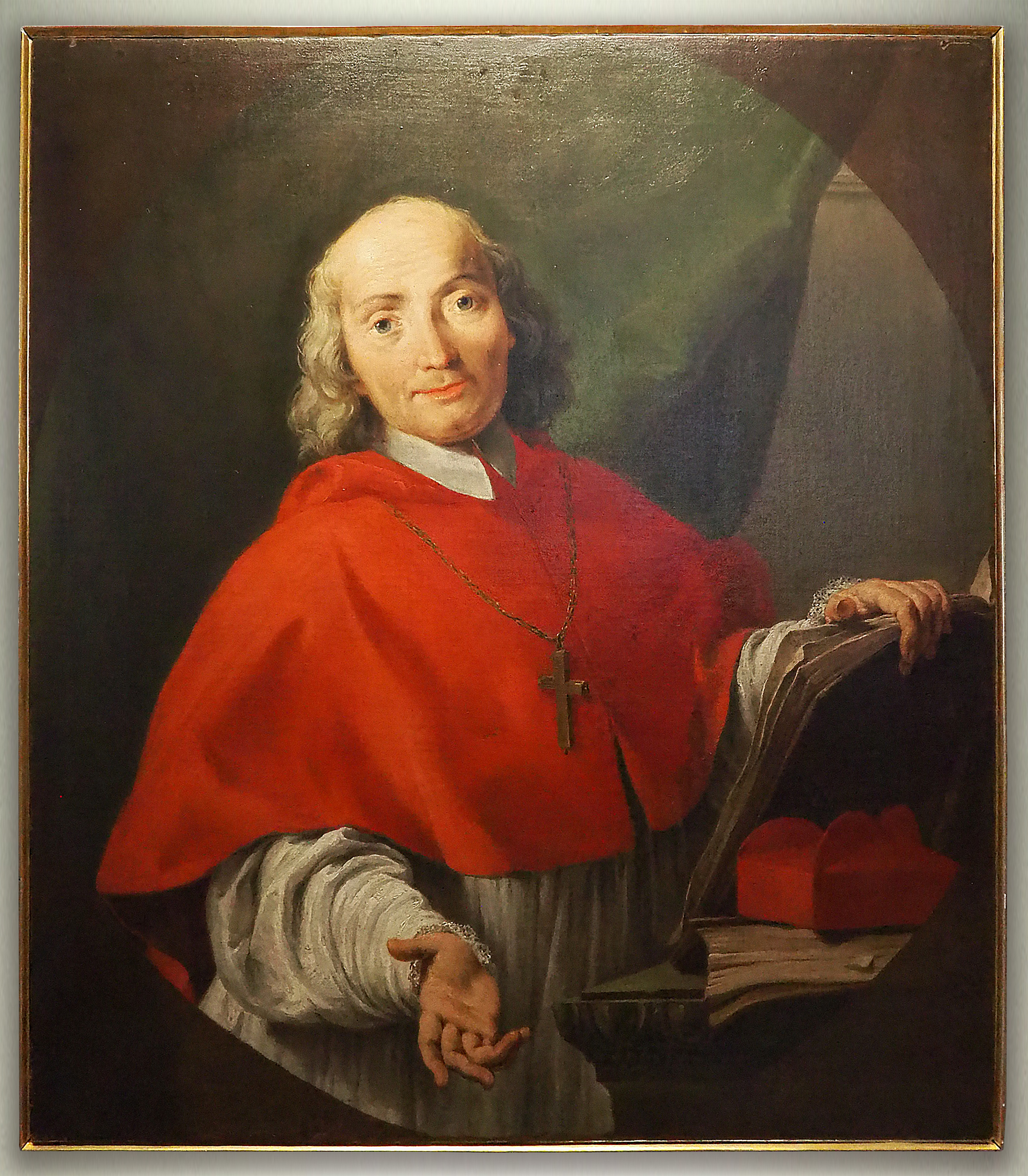
Bartolomeo Roverella, portrait by Giambattista Pittoni, painting in Palazzo Roverella, Rovigo

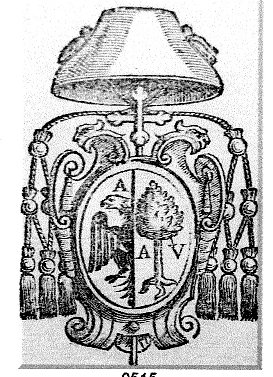
Coat of arms of Cardinal Bartolomeo Roverella.

Bartolomeo Roverella (1406–1476) (called the Cardinal of Ravenna) was an Italian Roman Catholic Bishop and cardinal.

== Biography ==
Bartolomeo Roverella was born in Rovigo in 1406, the son of Palatine Count Giovanni Roverella (camerlengo of Leonello d'Este, Marquis of Ferrara), and his wife Beatrice de' Leopardi di Lendinara. Bartolomeo Roverella received a doctorate in law.

After completing his education, Roverella became a clerk of the Bishop of Modena. He was next a chaplain of the Patriarch of Aquileia. He then moved to Rome and became secretary to Pope Eugene IV.

On 15 July 1444 he was elected the first ever Bishop of Adria. He was promoted to the metropolitan see of Ravenna on 26 September 1445.

He was present in Rome for the papal conclave of March 1447. He became a papal chamberlain to Pope Nicholas V and auditor of the Roman Rota. He served as governor of Umbria from 1448 to 1451. In 1451, he was appointed nuncio to the Kingdom of England. From 1452 to 1455, he was governor of Marche Piceno. In 1459, he served as governor of Viterbo. In Viterbo he was able to suppress a revolt by the Maganza faction, imprisoning and executing Alessio de Tignosi.

Pope Pius II named him papal legate to the Kingdom of Naples in 1460. He was then governor of Benevento from 1460 to 1466.

In the consistory of 18 December 1461, Pope Pius II made him a cardinal priest while Rovarella was in his legation to Naples. Upon his return to Rome on 26 January 1462, he was awarded the titular church of San Clemente, and then received the red hat on 30 January 1462.

On 13 February 1464 he returned to the Kingdom of Naples, where he supported Ferdinand of Aragon against René of Anjou.

Cardinal Roverella returned to Rome on 23 August 1464, and participated in the papal conclave of 1464 that elected Pope Paul II. On 8 January 1470 Paul II named him papal legate to Perugia.

He returned to Rome on 1 August 1471 to participate in the papal conclave of 1471 that elected Pope Sixtus IV. The new pope named him Apostolic legate to the March of Ancona and he left for his legation on 24 October 1471. He returned to Rome in 1473.

On 12 January 1475 he was elected Camerlengo of the Sacred College of Cardinals.

He died in Ferrara on 2 May 1476. He is buried in San Clemente.

Catholic Church titles
Preceded by Berardo Eroli	Camerlengo of the Sacred College of Cardinals; 1475	Succeeded by Jacopo Piccolomini-Ammannati
