= Robert Guibé =

French Roman Catholic bishop and cardinal

His Eminence Robert Guibé
- Church: Roman Catholic

Personal details
- Born: ca. 1460 Vitré, Ille-et-Vilaine, France
- Died: November 9, 1513 Rome, Papal States

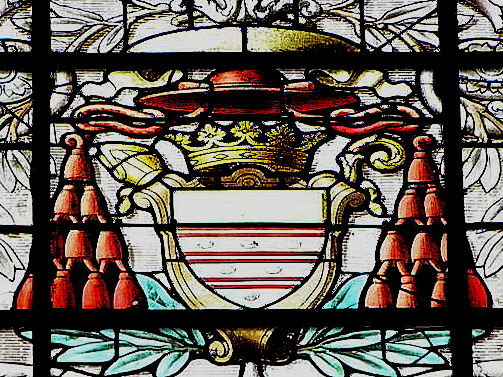
Coat of arms of Cardinal Robert Guibé in Rennes Cathedral.

Robert Guibé (died 1513) (called the Cardinal of Nantes) was a French Roman Catholic bishop and cardinal.

== Biography ==
Robert Guibé was born in Vitré ca. 1460, the son of Adanet Guibé and Olive Laudais.

In 1475, he became cantor of the cathedral chapter of Dol Cathedral. He became archdeacon of the Basilica of the Holy Saviour in Dinan in 1481.

On May 16, 1483, he was elected Bishop of Tréguier. On August 18, 1483, he took the oath before Francis II, Duke of Brittany; the duke sent him to Rome as head of an embassy to pay homage to the newly elected Pope Innocent VIII. He became Prior of the Benedictine Abbey of the Holy Cross in Vitré in 1490. He became Prior of Châteaugiron in 1495. As of the Synod of Tréguier, held June 11, 1495, he had not yet been consecrated as a bishop. In 1499, Anne of Brittany sent him to Rome to secure a papal bull for the election of Guillaume Gueguien as Bishop of Nantes. On March 24, 1502, he was transferred to the see of Rennes upon the death of the previous bishop, his brother Michel. In 1503, he returned to Rome a third time, this time as the ambassador of Louis XII.

Upon the recommendation of Anne of Brittany, Pope Julius II made Guibé a cardinal priest in the consistory of December 1, 1505. He received the red hat and the titular church of Sant'Anastasia on December 17, 1505.

He was transferred to the see of Nantes on January 24, 1507, occupying this see until May 30, 1511, when he resigned in favor of a nephew. He spent 1510 as apostolic administrator of the see of Amalfi. On September 30, 1510, he became administrator of the see of Albi, occupying this office until his death. On March 17, 1511, he became administrator of the see of Vannes, also occupying this office for the rest of his life.

In 1511, he again served as the ambassador of Louis XII to Rome. However, the cardinal ultimately sided with the pope in his dispute with the king. In retaliation, the king seized the rents of all his benefices, reducing the cardinal to poverty.

On October 4, 1511, he became archpriest of the Basilica di Santa Maria Maggiore. He served as Camerlengo of the Sacred College of Cardinals in 1512 and 1513. He participated in the Fifth Council of the Lateran in 1512.

He participated in the papal conclave of 1513 that elected Pope Leo X. The new pope named him legate a latere to the Kingdom of France, though he died before he could leave on this legation.

He died in Rome on November 9, 1513. He was initially buried in Sant'Ivo dei Bretoni. His remains were later transferred to Rennes Cathedral.
