= Domenico de Simone =

Catholic clergyman, Cardinal

His Eminence Domenico de Simone
- Cardinal-Deacon of Sant'Angelo in Pescheria
- Church: Roman Catholic Church
- Appointed: 5 July 1830
- Term ended: 9 November 1837
- Predecessor: Alphonse-Hubert de Latier de Bayane
- Successor: Luigi Ciacchi
- Previous post: Camerlengo of the College of Cardinals (1832-33)

Orders
- Created cardinal: 15 March 1830 by Pope Pius VIII
- Rank: Cardinal-Deacon

Personal details
- Born: Domenico de Simone; 29 November 1768 Benevento, Kingdom of Naples
- Died: 9 November 1837 (aged 68) Rome, Papal States
- Buried: Sant'Angelo in Pescheria
- Parents: Filippo de Simone; Vicenza Capece Scondito
- Education: Pontifical Academy of Ecclesiastical Nobles

Styles of Domenico de Simone
- Reference style: His Eminence
- Spoken style: Your Eminence
- Informal style: Cardinal
- See: Prefect of Papal Household

Domenico de Simone (29 November 1768–9 November 1837) was an Italian cardinal. He was part of the Roman Curia.

He was born in Benevento and died in Rome.

He was made a cardinal in March 1830 by Pope Pius VIII and took part in the 1830–1831 conclave which chose Pope Gregory XVI.
