= Angelo Capranica =

Italian Roman Catholic bishop and cardinal

Coat of arms of Cardinal Angelo Capranica.

Angelo Capranica (c. 1415 -1478) (called the Cardinal of Santa Croce or the Cardinal of Rieti) was an Italian Roman Catholic bishop and cardinal.

== Biography ==
Angelo Capranica was born in Rome around 1415, the son of de Niccoló Pantagati da Capranica and his wife, Iacobella. He was the younger brother of Domenico Capranica, who became a cardinal in 1423 but was not recognized as such by Pope Eugene IV until much later.

Angelo was elected Archbishop of Manfredonia on 17 March 1438. This may have been tied to his brother's reconciliation with the pope. Angelo was transferred to the see of Ascoli Piceno by Pope Nicholas V on 4 May 1447, and then to the see of Rieti on 25 September 1450. Angelo also served as governor of Cesena and of Foligno. Shortly after his brother's death in August 1458, Pope Pius II named him governor of Bologna in September 1458. Domenico, shortly before his death, had founded a seminary in his palace, the Almo Collegio Capranica; the younger Capranica expanded the palace and opened it to students in 1460.

In the consistory celebrated in Siena on 5 March 1460, Pope Pius II made Capranica a cardinal priest. Capranica entered Siena on 21 March 1460, receiving the red hat later that day. On 26 March 1460 he received the titular church of Santa Croce in Gerusalemme, his brother's former title.

In April 1460, Angelo was appointed legate a latere to Bologna. He returned to Rome on 31 December 1460. He left Rome for Bologna a second time on 18 May 1461, returning on November 17. He left for Bologna a third time on 23 February 1463, before rejoining the papal court in Siena on 24 March 1464.

Angelo participated in the papal conclave of 1464 that elected Pope Paul II. The new pope renewed Capranica's appointment as legate a latere on 1 October 1464, and he left for Bologna on 12 January 1465. He returned to Rome on 27 November, then on 6 May 1466 left again for Bologna, returning to Rome on 10 January 1468.

On 9 January 1469 Cardinal Capricana and Cardinal Roderic Llançol i de Borja accompanied Frederick III, Holy Roman Emperor, from Rome to Viterbo.

Angelo participated in the papal conclave of 1471 that elected Pope Sixtus IV. On 23 November 1471 the new pope named him papal legate to the Italian princes for the purposes of a new crusade against the Ottoman Turks.

On 11 December 1472 Angelo became a cardinal bishop, taking the suburbicarian see of Palestrina, though retaining his titulus of Santa Croce in Gerusalemme in commendam. Angelo Capranica was at times abbot in commendam of the Vallombrosan monastery of San Pancrazio in Florence and of the Vallombrosan monastery of San Basilio di Cavata in the diocese of Parma, as well as of the Benedictine monasteries of San Bartolomeo in Ferrara, Santa Sofia in Benevento and San Giovanni degli Eremiti in Palermo.

Angelo became Archbishop of Fermo, his brother's former see, on 9 April 1473. He celebrated a synod there, but soon fell ill and returned to Rome on 17 November 1473, resigning the archbishopric on 17 June 1474.

Capranica died in Rome on 3 July 1478. He is buried in Santa Maria sopra Minerva in the same chapel as his brother.
