= Juan de Carvajal (cardinal) =

Spanish cardinal

Cardinal Juan de Carvajal
- Cardinal-Bishop
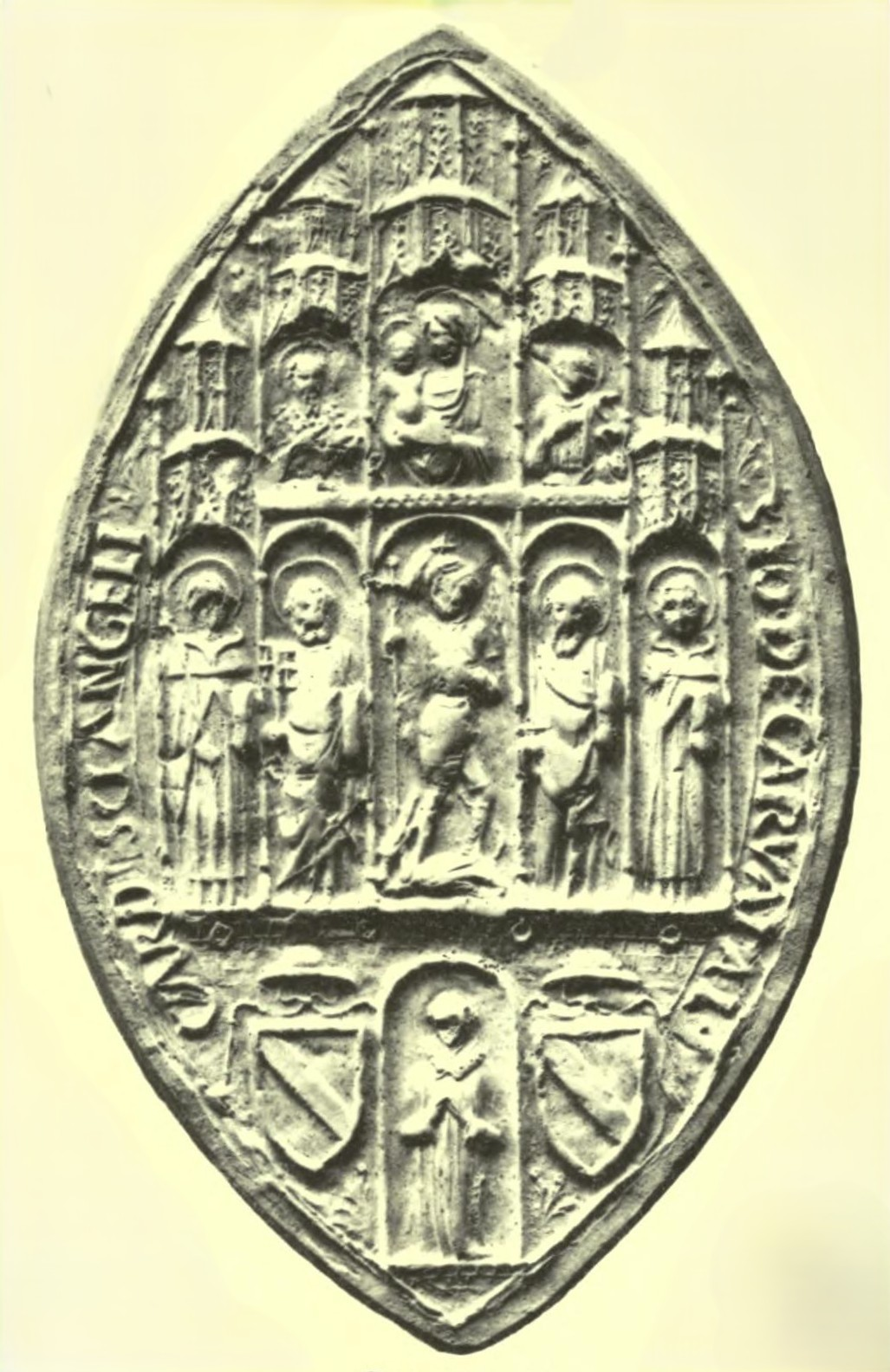
- Carvajal's seal
- Church: Sant'Angelo in Pescheria (1446-1469)
- Diocese: Porto (1461-1469)

Orders
- Created cardinal: 16 December 1446 by Pope Eugene IV

Personal details
- Born: ca. 1400 Truxillo (Trujillo), Spain
- Died: 6 December 1469 Rome
- Buried: San Marcello al Corso, Rome
- Occupation: diplomat
- Profession: Bishop
- Education: Licenciate in Civil and Canon Law
- Alma mater: Salamanca
- Coat of arms

Juan de Carvajal (Carvagial) (c. 1400 in Trujillo, Cáceres – 6 December 1469, in Rome) was a Spanish Cardinal. Though he began his career as a lawyer and judge in the papal administration, he spent most of his active life travelling as a diplomat in Germany and eastern Europe, attempting to arrange a crusade against the Ottoman Turks. He was particularly active in Bohemia and Hungary, where he also employed his powers to fight the Hussites. He was a mainstay in trying to preserve the institution of the Papacy from the Conciliarism of the Council of Basel.

== Life and work ==
Carvajal held the Licentiate in canon law and civil law from the University of Salamanca (1436). He was Canon of Avila as well as of Salamanca. By 1438 he had attained distinction at Rome as Auditor of the Rota, appointed at the request of the King of Castile, John II (1406-1454). He became attached to Cardinals Juan Cervantes, Domenico Ram, and Alfonso Carillo. Under Pope Martin V Carvajal served as Governor of the City of Rome.

His life, however, was to be spent mostly in the foreign service of the Papacy. His contemporary, Cardinal Jacopo Ammanati-Piccolomini, says that he was sent as papal legate to various rulers and countries twenty-two times.

In June 1434 Pope Eugenius was forced to flee from Rome, due to a combination of hostile forces, led by Filippo Maria Visconti of Milan, Niccolò Fortebraccio the condottiere, and the Colonna family in Rome, who formed their own republic. Juan Carvajal and many of the Roman curials fled to the Castel S. Angelo. Eugene found refuge in Florence, where Carvajal soon made his way. During the Council of Basel, Carvajal was assigned to work with Juan de Torquemada, O.P., who was at the time (from 1435 to 1439) Master of the Sacred Palace (Papal Theologian), to counteract the schism of the Fathers at Basel.

Between 1440 and 1448 he spent much time in Germany. He worked with Cardinal Nicholas of Cusa, to placate the strong feelings of the German princes against Pope Eugene IV (1383 – 23 February 1447), to overcome their "neutrality" in the last and schismatic phase of the Council of Basel. The Council had taken the position that the ecumenical assembly of representatives of all the Church was superior to one member of the Church, even if he was Pope. In 1442 Carvajal was again sent along with Nicholas of Cusa by the Pope to the Diet at Frankfurt. Cardinal Giuliano Cesarini was sent to work on behalf of Pope Eugenius at the Council of Basel and to negotiate with Emperor Sigismund, and when the Council was dissolved, he was sent as Legate to Hungary (1442-1444). Cesarini was killed at the Battle of Varna.

Aeneas Silvius Piccolomini was sent in 1445 by Frederick the King of Germany to negotiate with Pope Eugene. Carvajal and Bishop Tommaso Parentucelli of Bologna were sent in 1445 to attempt to dissolve the league of the electors in Germany.

Piccolomini and Carvajal, who succeeded Cardinal Cesarini, were finally able to bring about the treaty known as the Concordat of the Princes (1447), in which Pope Eugenius acknowledged that a general council was superior to a pope. Carvajal was also instrumental in negotiating the Concordat of Aschaffenburg (or Vienna) (1448), which supported the Papacy against the members of the Church.

=== Cardinalate ===
He was rewarded by Pope Eugene IV on 14 December 1446 with the Cardinal's hat and the title of St. Angelo in Foro Piscium or "in Pescheria". He had been promoted as Bishop of Plasencia in Spain, a diocese in Extremadura, to replace Bishop Gonzalo García de Santamaria (1379 -1448), who had been Bishop there from 2 July 1423 to 1446. Carvajal never took possession of his diocese; he was Bishop-Elect when created a cardinal in December 1446. His work was done by an auxiliary bishop, Didacus de S. Michaele of Granada.

In 1444 and again in 1448 Juan Carvajal was sent to Bohemia to promote the cause of religious unity; but he failed both times, owing to the stubbornness of the Calixtines or Utraquists and the influence of the Calixtine John Rokyczana, who had been declared Archbishop of Prague by Sigismund, the Holy Roman Emperor and King of Hungary. Rokyczana, whose orthodoxy was suspected at Rome, was never approved by the Pope however and, from Rome's point of view, the Archdiocese of Prague was vacant from the death of Conrad de Vechta in 1431 until 1561.

Pope Eugene died on 23 February 1447. The Conclave to elect his successor met at the Church of Santa Maria sopra Minerva in Rome, beginning on 4 March, with eighteen of the twenty-six cardinals in attendance, Juan Carvajal among them. On March 6 Cardinal Tommaso Parentucelli of Sarzana, the Bishop of Bologna, was elected, and chose the name Nicholas V. He died on 24 March 1455.

The Conclave to elect a successor to Nicholas V assembled at the Vatican Palace on 4 April 1455, with fifteen cardinals in attendance including Cardinal Carvajal. Six cardinals were unable to attend. Cardinal Bessarion, it seems, was able to acquire eight votes, which was a majority but not the required two-thirds majority. Cardinal Alain de Coëtivy made a highly inflammatory speech, pointing out that Bessarion was a Greek and perhaps not as orthodox as one might wish in a pope. Cardinal Scarampi, who was working in the interests of King Alfonso V of Aragon who wished to pursue a war against Genoa and needed a complacent pope, pressed the candidacy of Cardinal Alfonso Borgia, who was seventy-six years old, a friend of King Alfonso, and eager to launch a crusade against the Ottoman Turks. On 8 April 1455 Borgia was elected; he chose the name Calixtus III.

In 1455 Carvajal was sent by Pope Callistus III to Hungary to preach a vigorous crusade against the Turks, and for six years was the leader of the first effectual resistance made by Christian Europe to the progress of the Ottoman conquerors of Constantinople (1453). Aided by the Observant Franciscan preacher John Capistran, he gathered an army of about 40,000 men, effected a union with the troops of John Hunyadi, and on 22 July 1456 the siege of Belgrade, the key of the Danube, was raised by a victory that inaugurated the century-long resistance of Hungary to the Ottomans. Carvajal baptized King Thomas of Bosnia into the Roman Catholic Church. Tommaso Tommasini, Bishop of Lesina, converted the King from the Bosnian Church to Roman Catholicism between 1445 and 1446, however, only as late as 1457 did Cardinal perform the baptism.

Calixtus III died on 6 August 1458, but Cardinal Carvajal was not in Rome, and therefore did not participate in the Conclave that elected Cardinal Aeneas Silvius Piccolomini as Pope Pius II. He was still Legate in Hungary

He reconciled King Ladislaus the Posthumous (1457) with Emperor Frederick III, and in 1458 made peace between the Hungarian nobles in favour of Matthias Corvinus as successor of Ladislaus. He was still in Hungary when Pope Pius II invited the princes of Christian Europe to meet him at Mantua (1459) to confer on the common danger and the need of a general crusade. While Cardinal Bessarion sought in Germany something more than brilliant promises, Carvajal continued his labours in Hungary, which he left only in the autumn of 1461, "grown old and feeble", says Pastor, "in that severe climate, amid the turmoils of the Court and the camp, and the fatigues of travel … [in] that bleak country of moorlands and marshes".

Cardinal Giorgio Fieschi, Bishop of Ostia, died on 8 October 1461; the vacancy was immediately filled by Cardinal Guillaume d'Estouteville, who opted for the office of Bishop of Ostia at the papal Consistory of 26 October, leaving a vacancy in the diocese of Porto. On the same day, Cardinal Juan Carvajal opted for Porto and Santa Rufina. From then on, he lived in Rome, in a house near S. Marcello. He had long held the See of Plasencia in Spain, where a noble bridge across the Tagus, built by him, is still known as "the cardinal's bridge". In spite of his age and feeble health, he was still willing to take a foremost part in the crusade that Pius II was preparing at Ancona in 1464, when the death of that pope (14/15 August) put an end to the enterprise.

According to the rules of Pope Gregory X promulgated at the Second Council of Vienne, the Conclave should have taken place in the place where the Pope had died. But Pius II, anticipating his possible death during his travels, had issued a decree on 5 January 1459 suspending the regulation of Gregory X and specifying instead that the Conclave should take place in Rome no matter where he died. If he died closer to Rome than the distance from Rome to Florence, the Cardinals in Rome must wait for fifteen days for their colleagues to assemble, and they could then proceed to an election, no matter how many cardinals had arrived; if the death occurred farther away than Florence, then they were required to wait for thirty days before beginning the Conclave. The cardinals therefore made their way from Ancona to Rome with the body of Pius II, and assembled in the Apostolic Palace of the Vatican on 27 August. They did not settle down to vote, however, until 30 August, with twenty of the twenty-nine cardinals present. Cardinal Carvajal, now the Cardinal Bishop of Porto, was junior only to Cardinal Bessarion (Frascati) and Cardinal d'Estouteville (Ostia). He was even being talked about as a possible pope, at least in Court gossip. In the first scrutiny, though, as the votes were being read out, Cardinal Pietro Barbo of Venice reached twelve votes, at which point all the uncounted votes were cancelled by the cardinals who had cast them and they voted by voice for Barbo as well, making him Pope. Cardinal Bessarion, the prior Episcoporum, then polled each cardinal individually and each agreed to the election of Barbo. He chose the name Paul II.

Under Pope Paul II, the Venetian Pietro Barbo (1464–1471), Carvajal was appointed along with Cardinal Bessarion and Cardinal d'Estouteville to a commission to consider the state of ecclesiastical affairs in Bohemia. The underlying issue was the orthodoxy and reliability of the Utraquist King of Bohemia, George of Poděbrady. Carvajal deeply distrusted him, and believed "that it would be absolutely necessary to employ the knife in the case of wounds which admitted of no other remedy, and to guard against fatal corruption by severing the decayed members from the body of Holy Church." To say that he was a rigorist is superfluous.

Cardinal Carvajal's last legation was to Venice in 1466.

=== Reputation ===
"Such a legate", wrote Ladislaus V of Hungary, "truly corresponds to the greatness of our need." By his contemporaries he was considered the ornament of the Church, comparable to her ancient Fathers (Cardinal Ammanati) and the sole reminder of the heroic grandeur of Rome's earliest founders (Pomponius Laetus). Though genial in intercourse, there was something awe-inspiring about this saintly man whose ascetic life enabled him to provide liberally for the poor and for needy churches. Heinrich Denifle mentions a college sub invocatione S. Angeli founded by Carvajal at Salamanca in 1457.

František Palacký, Czech historian, writes of Carvajal: "Not only in zeal for the Faith, in moral purity and strength of character, was he unsurpassed, but he was also unequalled in knowledge of the world, in experience of ecclesiastical affairs, and in the services which he rendered to the papal authority. It was chiefly due to his labours, prolonged during a period of twenty years, that Rome at last got the better of Constance and Basle, that the nations returned to their allegiance, and that her power and glory again shone before the world with a splendour that they had not seen since the time of Boniface VIII." Pastor says of him that he was absolutely free from the restless ambition and self-glorification so common among the men of the Renaissance, and seemed born for ecclesiastical diplomacy. His dominant idea was the consecration of his life to the Church and the promotion of the glory and power of Christ's Vicar. "Pars hæc vitæ ultima Christo neganda non est" (I must not refuse to Christ this last portion of my life) were the words in which he offered himself to Pius II as leader of a relief to the Republic of Ragusa which was being hard-pressed in 1464 by the Turks.

He left no printed works, though he heard from Pius II about the printing of the Gutenberg Bible in a famous letter of 1455, and had an edition of the works of Thomas Aquinas posthumously dedicated to him by the first printers of Italy, Sweynheym and Pannartz, in 1469. Among his manuscript remains are a defence of the Holy See, reports of his legations, a volume of letters, and various discourses. His discourse in the papal consistories, says Pastor, was brief, simple, clear, logical, and devoid of contemporary rhetoric; his legatine reports have the same "restrained and impersonal character".

=== Death and burial ===
Cardinal Carvajal died in Rome on 6 December 1469. He was buried in San Marcello al Corso. A monument erected to him there by Cardinal Bessarion, following the epitaph, bears a poem in elegiacs with these words: Hic anima Petrus, pectore Cæsar erat (A Peter in spirit, a Cæsar in courage).

== Sources ==
- Antonio, Nicolás, Bibliotheca Hispana vetus, sive, Hispani scriptores qui ab Octaviani Augusti aevo ad annum Christi MD. floruerunt, Matriti : Apud viduam et heredes D. Ioachimi Ibarrae ..., 1788, II, 296.
- Creighton, Mandell (1892). A History of the Papacy during the Period of the Reformation. The Council of Basel: The Papal restoration, 1418-1464. Vol. II (new ed.). London: Longmans, Green, and Company.
- Davies, Martin, Juan de Carvajal and Early Printing: The 42-line Bible and the Sweynheym and Pannartz Aquinas in The Library, 18 (1996) 193-215.
- Fine, John Van Antwerp Jr. (2007). The Bosnian Church: Its Place in State and Society from the Thirteenth to the Fifteenth Century. Saqi. ISBN 978-0-86356-503-8.
- Gómez Canedo, Lino, Un español al servicio de la Santa Sede, Don Juan de Carvajal: cardenal de Sant'Angelo legado en Alemania y Hungria, 1399?-1469, Madrid : Consejo Superior de Investigaciones Científicas, Instituto Jeronimo Zurita, 1947.
- Gregorovius, Ferdinand (1900). History of the City of Rome in the Middle Ages. Vol. VII, Part 1. London: G. Bell & sons.
- Lopez de Barrera, Domingo (1752). De rebus gestis Joannis S.R.E. Card. Carvajalis commentarius (in Latin). Rome: typis Heredum Laurentii Barbiellini.
- Pastor, Ludwig (1894). History of the Popes from the Close of the Middle Ages (tr. F. I. Antorbus, London, 1894), Volume IV, 131-135, and passim. Retrieved: 2016-11-22.
- Katona, Stephanus (Istvan). Historia critica regum Hungariae stirpis mirtae (Pesth, 1780), Tomulus VI, ordine xiii, ii, 1448–58.
- Shahan, Thomas. "Juan Carvajal (Carvagial)." The Catholic Encyclopedia. Vol. 3. New York: Robert Appleton Company, 1908. Retrieved: 2016-11-22.
- Stieber, Joachim W., Pope Eugenius IV, the Council of Basel and the secular and ecclesiastical authorities in the Empire: the conflict over supreme authority and power in the church, Leiden: Brill, 1978.
- Vast, Henri (1878). Le cardinal Bessarion (1403-1472) étude sur le chrétienté et la renaissance vers le milieu du XVe siècle (in French). Paris: Hachette.
