= Louis d'Albret =

French Cardinal

Louis d'Albret (1422–1465) was a French Cardinal. He was a son of Charles II of Albret, Count of Dreux.

He was bishop of Aire in 1445, bishop of Cahors in 1460. He was created Cardinal in 1461. In 1465 he was Bishop of Tarbes and Camerlengo of the Sacred College of Cardinals.

When he died in 1465, Cardinal d'Albret was buried at Santa Maria in Aracoeli in Rome on a tomb by Andrea Bregno.

He was the uncle of Cardinal Amanieu d'Albret.
