= Jacopo Piccolomini-Ammannati =

Italian cardinal and humanist

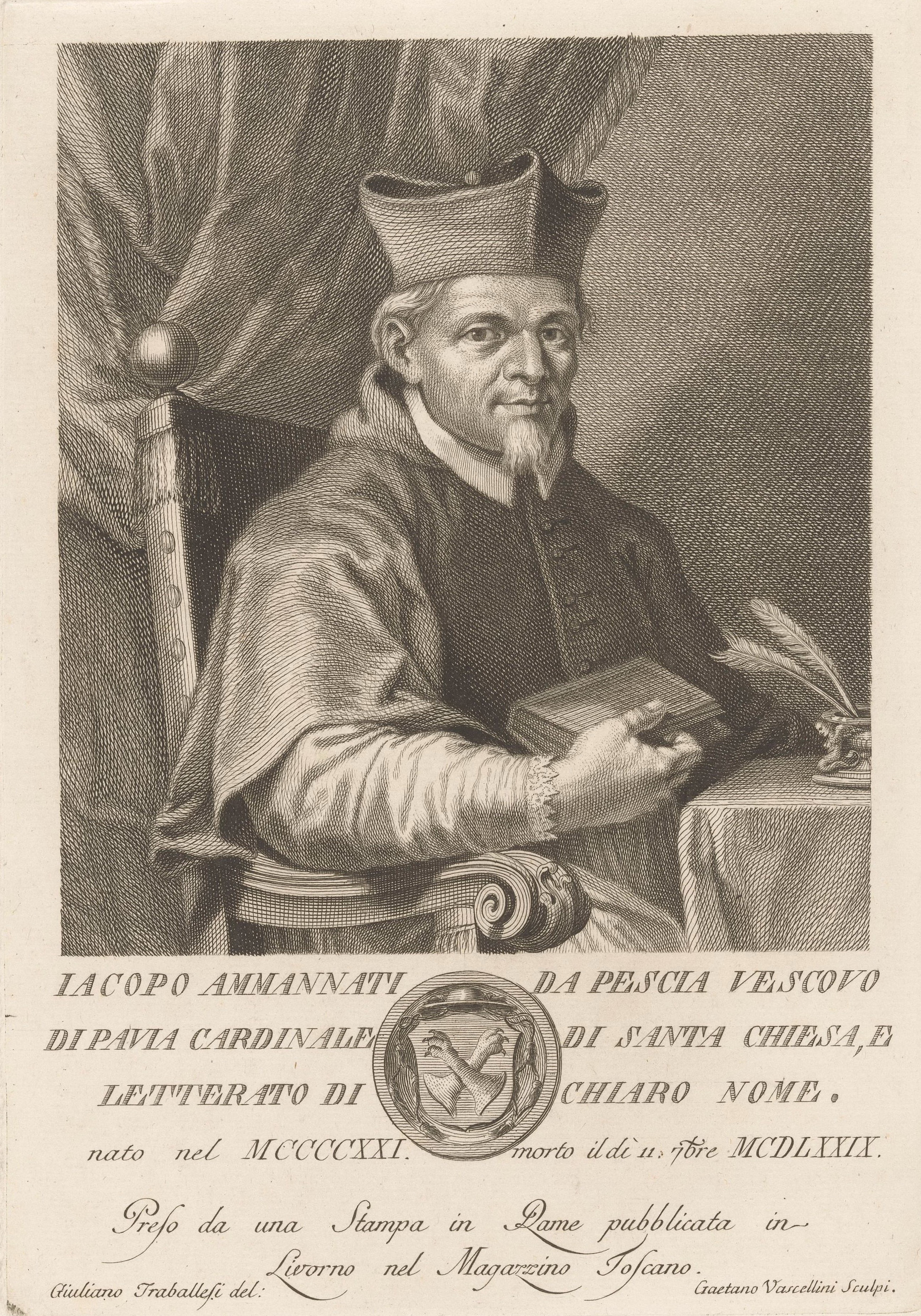
Image of Jacopo Piccolomini

Jacopo Piccolomini-Ammannati, or Giacomo Piccolomini (8 March 1422 – 10 September 1479) was an Italian Renaissance cardinal and humanist.

== Biography ==
He was born at Pescia, now in the province of Pistoia, Italy. He was related to the Piccolomini of Siena. He acquired his literary and theological education in Florence. Under Pope Nicholas V he went to Rome, where, for a while, he lived in extreme penury.

In 1450, he became private secretary to Cardinal Domenico Capranica; later Pope Callixtus III appointed him Secretary of Briefs. He was retained in this office by Pope Pius II, who also made him a member of the pontifical household, on which occasion he assumed the family name of Piccolomini. In 1460 he was made Bishop of Pavia by Pius II, and was Pius's most trusted confidant and adviser throughout his pontificate. Ammannati exhibited paternal solicitude in the government of his diocese, and during his prolonged absences entrusted its affairs to able vicars, with whom he remained in constant touch.

On 18 December 1461, Ammannati was made a cardinal, and was commonly known as the Cardinal of Pavia. He accompanied Pius II to Ancona and attended him in his last illness. In the subsequent conclave he favored the election of Pope Paul II, whose displeasure he afterward incurred by insisting on the full observance of the ante-election capitulations that the pope had signed. The imprisonment of his private secretary by Paul II on a charge of complicity in the Conspiracy of the Roman Academy offended Ammannati still more, and his open defense of the secretary aggravated the pope's ill-will. The disfavor in which he was held by Paul II did not exempt his episcopal revenues from sequestration by the Duke of Milan, Galeazzo Maria Sforza. It was due to his insistence that Paul II took energetic measures against King George Podiebrad of Bohemia. Pope Sixtus IV was scarcely more favorable towards Ammannati than was Paul II.

In 1470, he was transferred to the bishopric of Lucca and was named papal envoy to Umbria.

Ammannati was the friend of students and scholars, and protected Jacopo de Volterra. He enjoyed the friendship of noted prelates and humanists, such as Cardinal Carvajal and Cardinal Bartolomeo Roverella. Cardinal Bessarion (Pastor, Geschichte der Päpste, II, 731), praises his executive ability and readiness, charity and zeal.

He wrote a continuation in seven books of Pius II's Commentarii. His style is elegant, but he is not always impartial, especially apropos of Pope Paul II or Pope Sixtus IV. His Commentaries, nevertheless, remain an important source for contemporary history; and his valuable letters have been collected and published.

Ammannati died from malaria at San Lorenzo alle Grotte, near Bolsena.

Catholic Church titles
Preceded by Bartolomeo Roverella	Camerlengo of the Sacred College of Cardinals; 1476	Succeeded by Oliviero Carafa
