= Bessarion =

Greek theologian and scholar (1403–1472)

His Eminence Bessarion
- Cardinal; Latin Patriarch of Constantinople
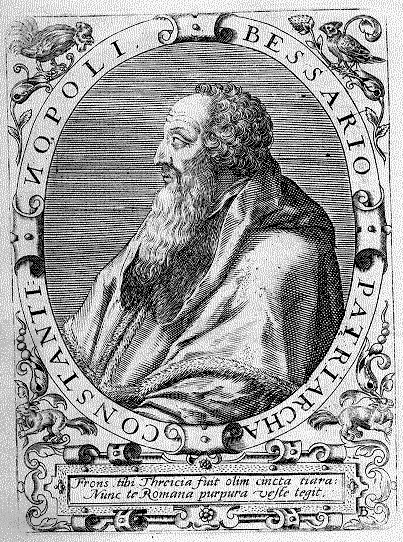
- Bessarion by Jean-Jacques Boissard
- Diocese: Constantinople
- Predecessor: Isidore of Kiev
- Successor: Pietro Riario

Orders
- Consecration: 1437
- Created cardinal: 18 December 1439 by Pope Eugene IV
- Rank: Cardinal bishop

Personal details
- Born: Basileios; 2 January 1403 Trebizond, Empire of Trebizond
- Died: 18 November 1472 (aged 69) Ravenna, Papal States
- Denomination: Catholic (formerly Eastern Orthodox)

Education
- Academic advisors: John Chortasmenos; Gemistus Pletho

Philosophical work
- Era: Renaissance philosophy
- Region: Western philosophy
- School: Neoplatonism
- Notable students: Regiomontanus
- Main interests: Metaphysics, theology

Bessarion (Greek: Βησσαρίων; 2 January 1403 – 18 November 1472) was a Byzantine Greek Renaissance humanist, theologian, Catholic cardinal and one of the famed Greek scholars who contributed to the revival of letters in the 15th century. He was educated by Gemistus Pletho in Neoplatonic philosophy and later served as the titular Latin Patriarch of Constantinople. He eventually was named a cardinal and was twice considered for the papacy.

His baptismal name was Basil (Greek: Βασίλειος, Basileios or Basilios). He took the name Bessarion upon entering the monastery. He has been mistakenly known also as Johannes Bessarion (Italian: Giovanni Bessarione) due to an erroneous interpretation of Gregory III Mammas.

== Biography ==
Bessarion was born in Trebizond, the Black Sea port in northeastern Anatolia that was the heart of Pontic Greek culture and civilization during the Byzantine and Ottoman periods. The year of his birth has been given as 1389, 1395 or 1403.

=== Bessarion's Neoplatonism ===
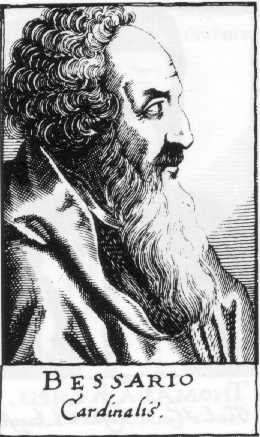
Wood engraving from Bibliotheca chalcographica, B1

Bessarion was educated in Constantinople, then went in 1423 to Mystras, Peloponnese to study Neoplatonism under Gemistus Pletho. Under Pletho, he "went through the liberal arts curriculum…, with a special emphasis on mathematics…including the study of astronomy and geography" that would have related "philosophy to physics…cosmology and astrology" and Pletho's "mathematics would include Pythagorean number-mysticism, Plato's cosmological geometry and the Neoplatonic arithmetic which connected the material world with the world of Plato's Forms. Possibly it also included astrology…" Woodhouse also mentions that Bessarion "had a mystical streak…[and] was proficient in Neoplatonic vocabulary…mathematics…and Platonic theology".

Bessarion's Neoplatonism stayed with him his whole life, even as a cardinal. He was very familiar with Neoplatonist terminology and used it in his letter to Pletho's two sons, Demitrios and Andronikos, on the death of his still-beloved teacher in 1452. Perhaps the most remarkable thing about his life was that a Neoplatonist could have played such a significant role in the Catholic Church for at least a brief time, though he was attacked for his views by more orthodox Catholic academics shortly after his death.

=== Role in the Council of Ferrara ===
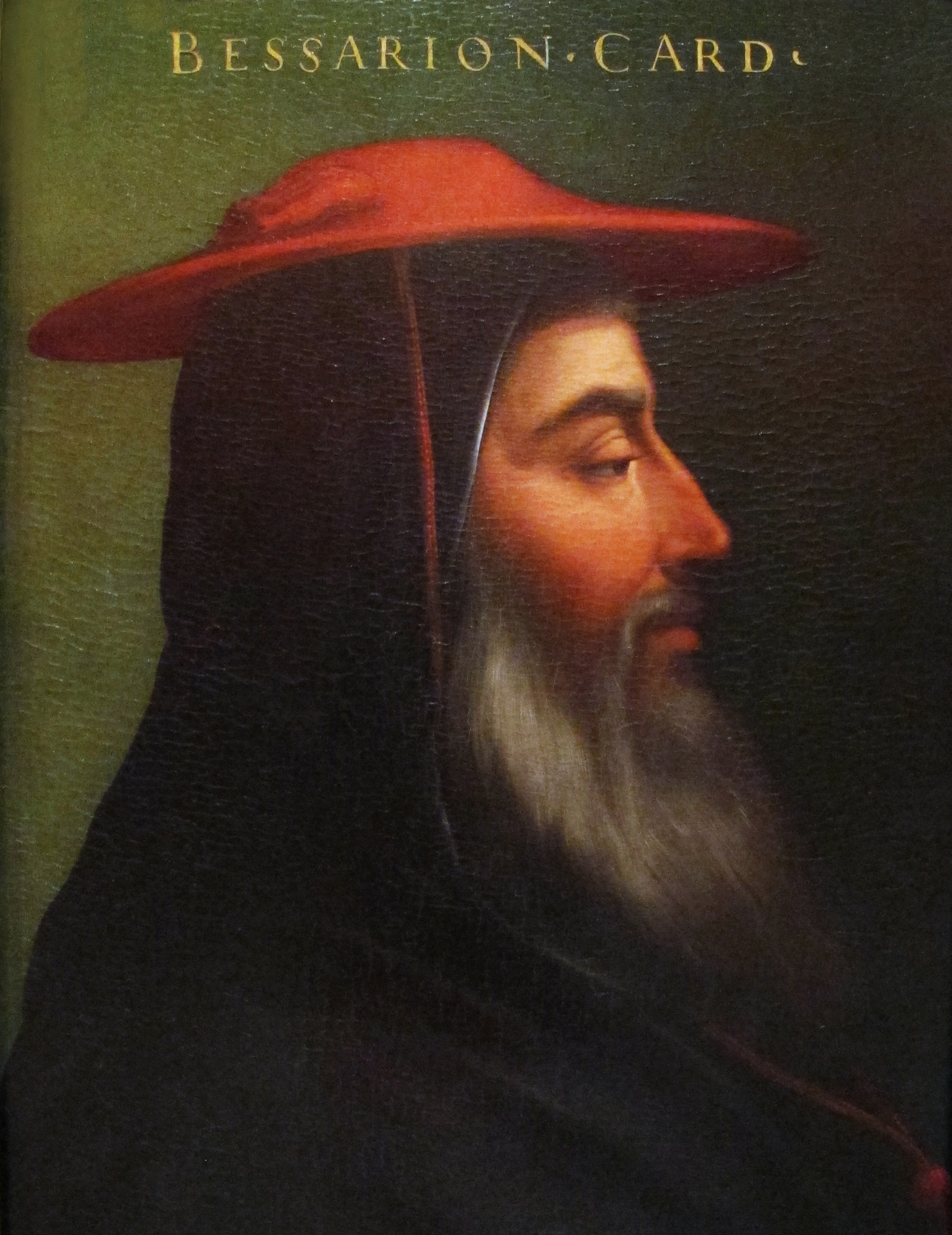
Portrait of Bessarion, 16th century

On becoming a tonsured monk, he adopted the name of Bessarion of Egypt, whose story he has related. In 1436 became abbot of a monastery in Constantinople and in 1437, he was made metropolitan of Nicaea by the Byzantine Emperor John VIII Palaeologus, whom he accompanied to Italy in order to bring about a reunion between the Eastern (Orthodox) and Western (Catholic) churches. The emperor hoped to use the possibility of re-uniting the churches to obtain help from Western Europe against the Ottoman Empire. Bessarion participated in the Byzantine delegation to the Council of Ferrara-Florence as the most eminent representative of unionists, although he originally belonged to the party of anti-unionists. On 6 July 1439, he read the declaration of the Greek Association of Churches in Florence cathedral, in the presence of Pope Eugene IV and John VIII.

Some historians have impugned Bessarion's sincerity in adhering to the union. However, Gill upholds Bessarion's sincerity in being convinced of the truth of the Roman position in the matters discussed at the Council, quoting from Bessarion's own work Oratio Dogmatica:

But if we had discerned error in the doctrine of the Latins or distortion in their faith, not even I would have counseled you to embrace union and agreement with them in that case, that for fear of bodily ills you should prefer the values of the present world to spiritual values, the freedom of the body to the betterment of the soul, but I myself would have undergone all that is worst and I would have exposed you to it before I would have urged you to union with them and have recommended such action.

=== Cardinal and later life ===
Styles of Bessarion
- Reference style: His Eminence
- Spoken style: Your Eminence
- Religious style: Cardinal
- Informal style: Cardinal
- See: Constantinople

Upon his return to the East, he found himself bitterly resented for his attachment to the minority party that saw no difficulty in a reconciliation of the two churches. Pope Eugene IV invested him with the rank of cardinal at the consistory of 18 December 1439.

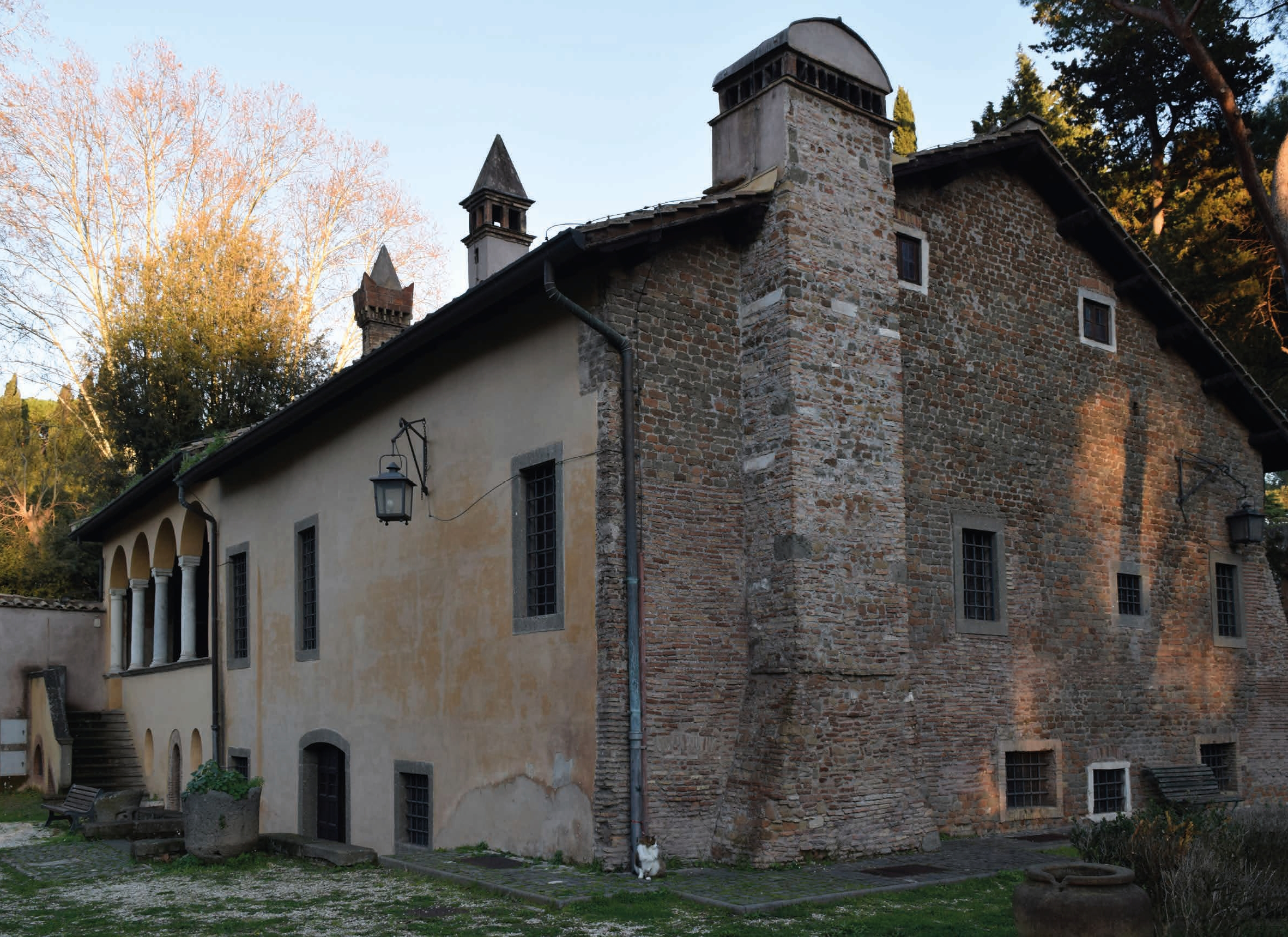
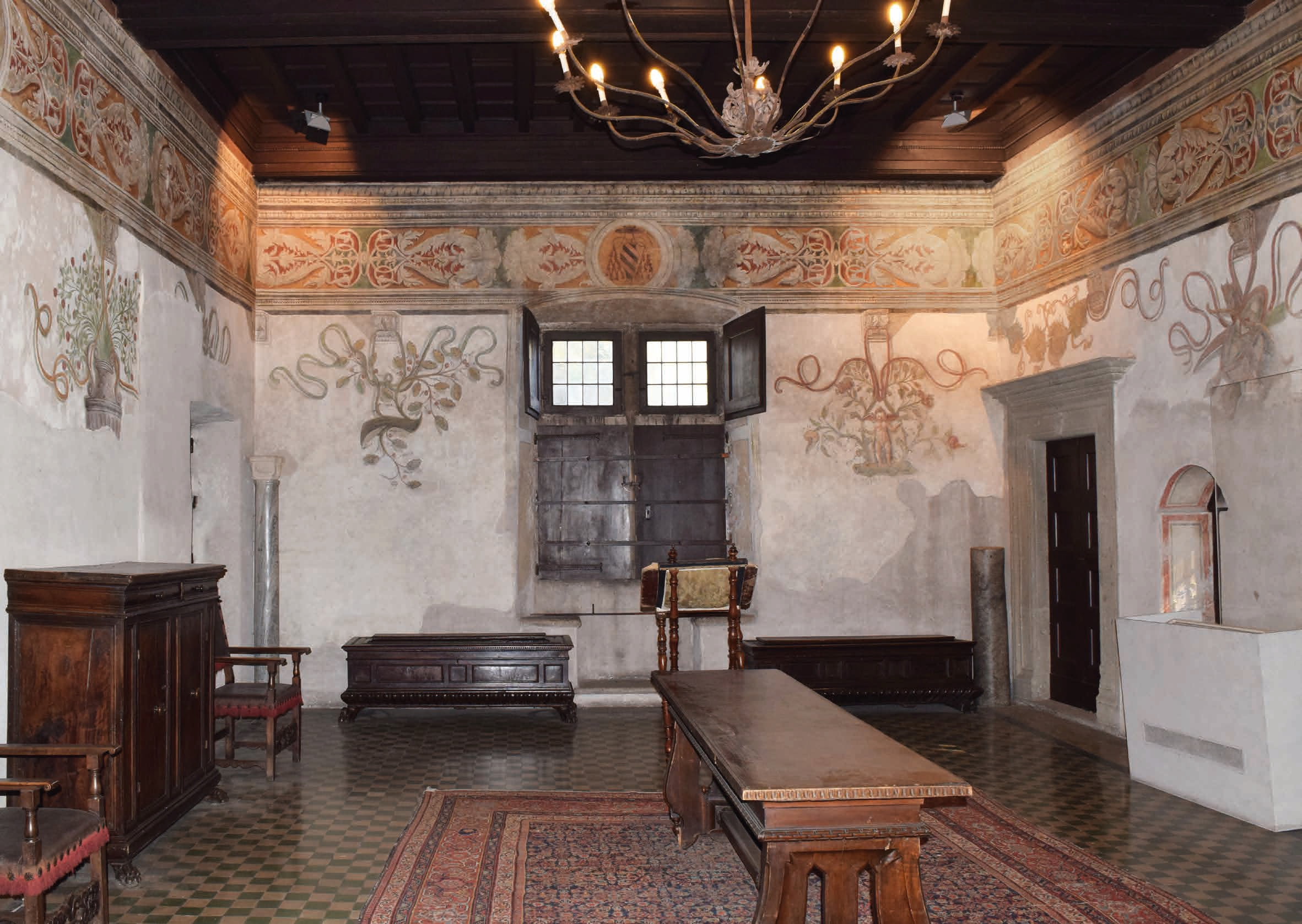
The suburban residence of the bishops of Tusculum along the Appian way in Rome, believed to have been built and utilized by Cardinal Bessarion during his episcopate (1449–1468).

From that time, Bessarion resided permanently in Italy, doing much (by his patronage of learned men, by his collection of books and manuscripts, and by his own writings) to spread the New Learning. His palazzo in Rome was a virtual academy for the studies of new humanistic learning, a center for learned Greeks and Greek refugees, whom he supported by commissioning transcripts of Greek manuscripts and translations into Latin that made Greek scholarship available to Western Europeans. He supported Regiomontanus in this fashion and defended Nicholas of Cusa. He is known in history as the original patron of the Greek exiles (scholars and diplomats) including Theodore Gaza, George of Trebizond, John Argyropoulos, and Janus Lascaris.

He held in succession the archbishopric of Siponto and the suburbicarian sees of Sabina and Frascati. At the papal conclave of 1455 which elected the Aragonese candidate, Alfons de Borja, as Pope Callixtus III, Cardinal Bessarion was an early candidate, favored on account of his disinterest in the struggle between candidates pushed forward by the Roman factions of the Orsini and Colonna. He was opposed for his Greek background by the French Cardinal Alain de Coëtivy.

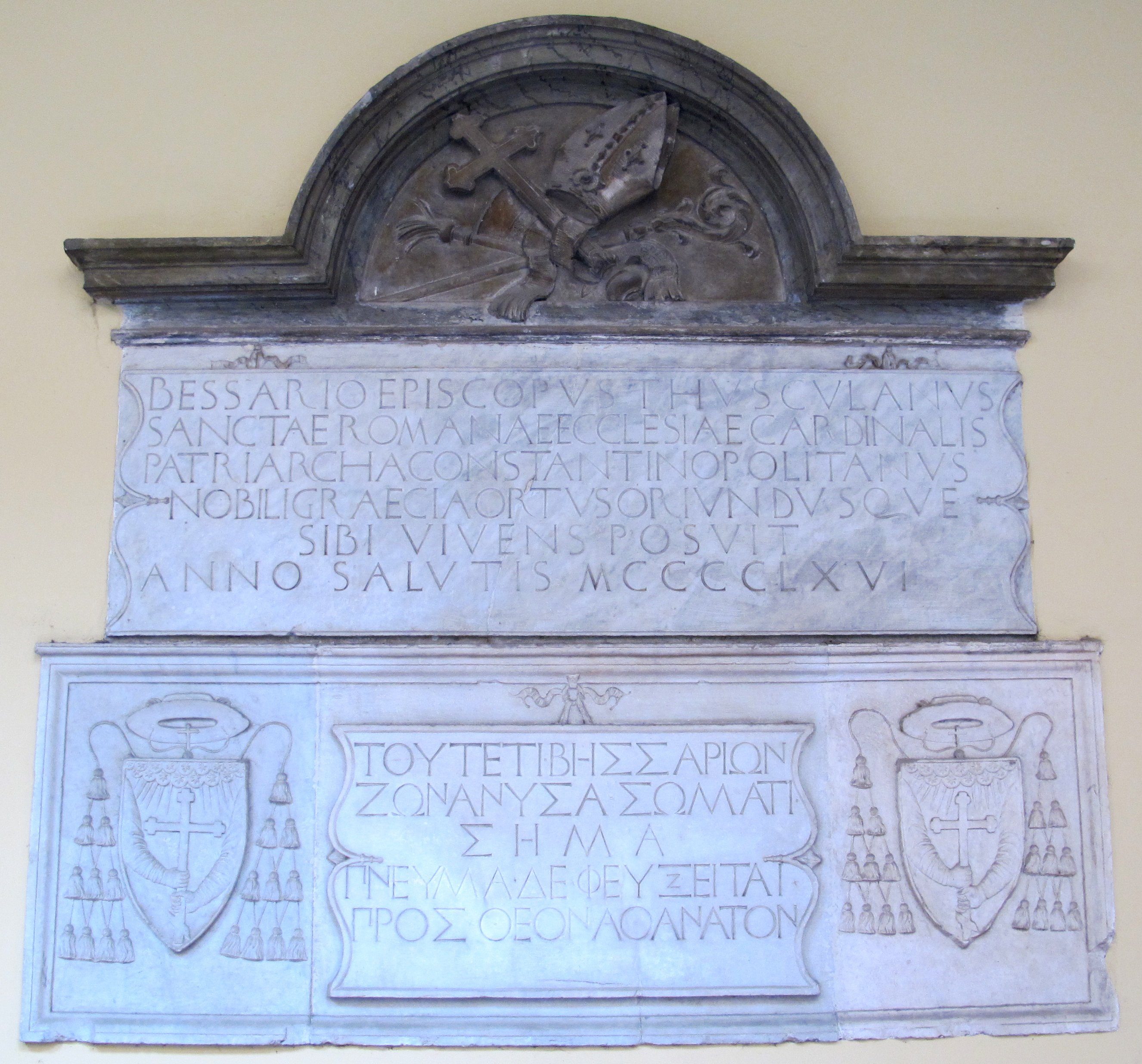
Tomb of Bessarion in the Santi Apostoli, Rome.

For five years (1450–1455), he was legate at Bologna, and he was engaged on embassies to many foreign princes, among others to Louis XI of France in 1471. Other missions were to Germany to encourage Western princes to help their fellow Christians in the East. For these efforts, his fellow humanist Aeneas Silvius Piccolomini, then Pius II, gave him the purely ceremonial title of Latin Patriarch of Constantinople in 1463. As primus Cardinalium (from April 1463) – the title Dean of the Sacred College of Cardinals was not yet in use – Cardinal Bessarion presided over the Papal conclave, 1464 and Papal conclave, 1471.

Bessarion was responsible for raising Sophia Palaiologina, niece of the last Byzantine emperor, Constantine XI Palaiologos. Sophia's father had fled to Rome, but died shortly after arriving. Bessarion later arranged the marriage of Sophia to Ivan III of Russia.

He died on 18 November 1472 at Ravenna. He was subsequently buried in the basilica of the Santi Apostoli, Rome in a large funerary chapel of which he had overseen the renovation during his life.

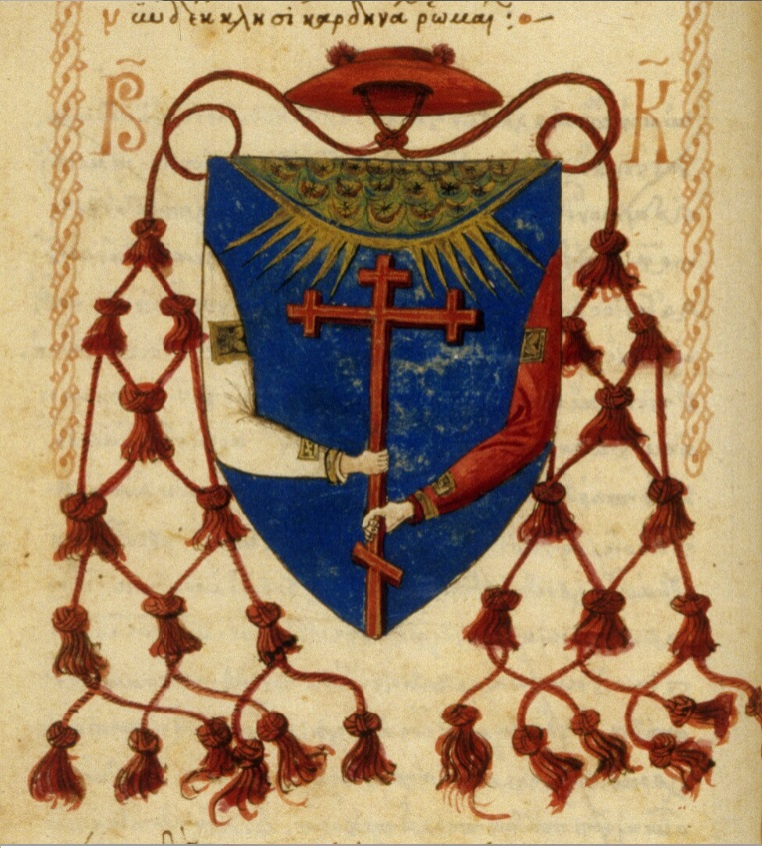
Cardinal Bessarion's Coat of Arms, from a 15th c. codex at Bodleian Library (Manuscript Holkham gr. 79). Features two arms (East and West) holding a Cross, crescent and star symbols over the Cross, a red Cardinal's hat on the top, and decorative tassels.

== Works ==
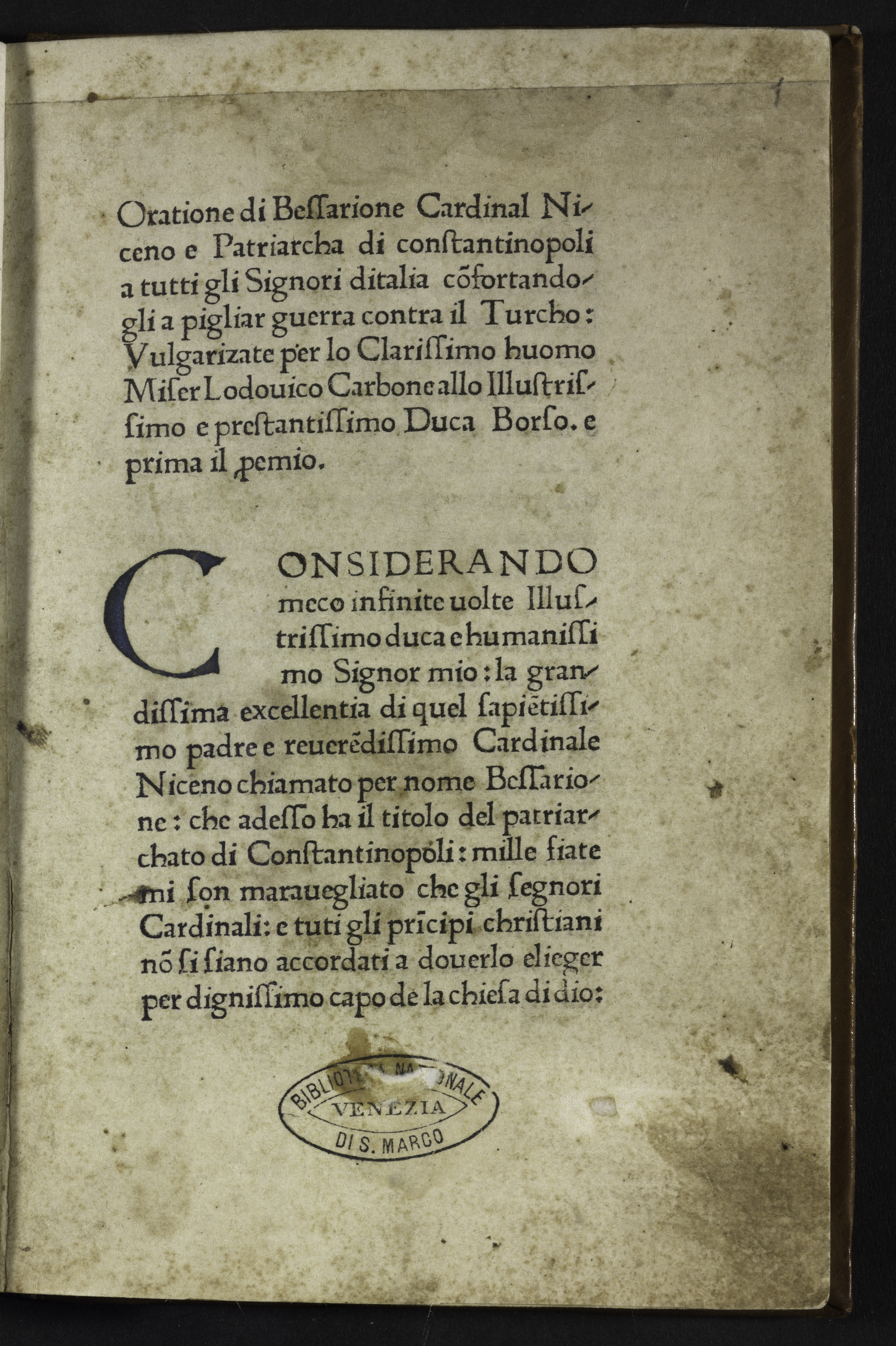
Epistolae et orationes, 1471

Bessarion was one of the most learned scholars of his time. Besides his translations of Aristotle's Metaphysics and Xenophon's Memorabilia, his most important work is a treatise directed against George of Trebizond, a vehement Aristotelian who had written a polemic against Plato, which was entitled In Calumniatorem Platonis ("Against the Slanderer of Plato"). Bessarion, though a Platonist, was not so thoroughgoing in his admiration as Gemistus Pletho, and he strove instead to reconcile the two philosophies. His work, by opening up the relations of Platonism to the main questions of religion, contributed greatly to the extension of speculative thought in the department of theology.

It was thanks to him that the Bibliotheca, an important compendium of Greek mythology, has survived to the present. His library, which contained a very extensive collection of Greek manuscripts, was presented by him in 1468 to the Senate of the Republic of Venice, and forms the nucleus of the famous library of St Mark's, the Biblioteca Marciana. It comprised 482 Greek and 264 Latin manuscripts. Most of Bessarion's works are in Migne, Patrologia Graeca, volume 161.

=== Editions ===
- Monfasani, John, ed. (2023). Liber Defensionum contra Obiectiones in Platonem: Cardinal Bessarion's own Latin translation of his Greek defense of Plato against George of Trebizond. Berlin; Boston: De Gruyter. ISBN 9783111246352.

== See also ==
- Greek scholars in the Renaissance

== Sources ==
- Bardi, Alberto. "Islamic Astronomy in Fifteenth-Century Christian Environments: Cardinal Bessarion and His Library", Journal of Islamic Studies, Volume 30, Issue 3, September 2019, pp. 338–366 (online).
- Herbermann, Charles, ed. (1913). "Johannes Bessarion" . Catholic Encyclopedia. New York: Robert Appleton Company. (not fully exploited)
- Francis A. Burkle-Young, "The election of Pope Calixtus III (1455)" Bessarion an early candidate, opposed by the French.
- Geanakoplos, Deno John. Greek Scholars in Venice: Studies in the Dissemination of Greek Learning from Byzantium to the West (Cambridge, Massachusetts : Harvard, 1962).
- Gill, Joseph. The Council of Florence (Cambridge, UK : Cambridge University Press, 1959).
- Harris, Jonathan. Greek Emigres in the West (Camberley : Porphyrogenitus, 1995).
- Henderson, Duane. "Bessarion, Cardinalis Nicenus. A cardinalitial vita between ideal conceptions and institutional structures," Claudia Märtl; Christian Kaiser; Thomas Ricklin, eds. (2013). "Inter graecos latinissimus, inter latinos graecissimus": Bessarion zwischen den Kulturen. Berlin: De Gruyter. ISBN 978-3-11-031621-6., 79–122.
- Keller, A. "A Byzantine admirer of 'western' progress: Cardinal Bessarion", in, Cambridge Historical Journal, 11 (1953[-]5), 343–8.
- Kraye, Jill, ed. (28 August 1997). "Chapter 12". Cambridge Translations of Renaissance Philosophical Texts: Moral and Political Philosophy. Vol. 1. Cambridge UK/New York: Cambridge University Press. ISBN 978-0-521-42604-6.
- Labowsky, Carlota. Bessarion's Library and the Biblioteca Marciana (Rome : Edizioni di storia e letteratura, 1979).
- Legrand, Émile. Bibliographie Hellenique (Paris : E. Leroux (E. Guilmoto), 1885–1906). volume 1.
- Märtl, Claudia; Christian Kaiser; Thomas Ricklin, eds. (2013). "Inter graecos latinissimus, inter latinos graecissimus": Bessarion zwischen den Kulturen. Berlin: De Gruyter. ISBN 978-3-11-031621-6.
- Mohler, Ludwig Kardinal Bessarion als Theologe, Humanist und Staatsmann (Aalen : Scientia Verlag; Paderborn : F. Schöningh, 1923–42), 3 volumes.
- Monfasani, John. Byzantine Scholars in Renaissance Italy: Cardinal Bessarion and other Émigrés (Aldershot, UK : Variorum, 1995).
- Setton, K.M. "The Byzantine background to the Italian Renaissance", in, Proceedings of the American Philosophical Society, 100 (1956), 1–76.
- Vast, Henri. Le Cardinal Bessarion (Paris : Hachette, 1878), see also (Geneva : Slatkine, 1977).
- Wilson, Nigel Guy. From Byzantium to Italy. Greek Studies in the Italian Renaissance (London : Duckworth, 1992).

Catholic Church titles
Preceded by Isidore of Kiev	— TITULAR — Latin Patriarch of Constantinople; 1463–1472	Succeeded by Pietro Riario
