= 1455 conclave =

Election of Catholic Pope Callixtus III

Papal conclave April 1455

Dates and location
- 4–8 April 1455; Apostolic Palace, Papal States

Key officials
- Dean: Giorgio Fieschi
- Camerlengo: Ludovico Trevisan
- Protopriest: Domenico Capranica
- Protodeacon: Prospero Colonna

Elected pope
- Alfons de Borja; Name taken: Callixtus III
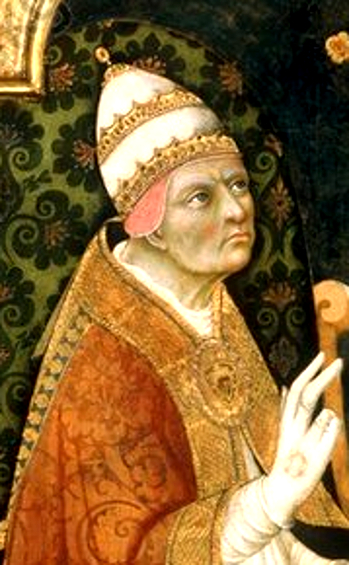

The 1455 papal conclave (4–8 April) elected Cardinal Alfons de Borja as Pope Callixtus III following the death of Pope Nicholas V. The conclave was the first in the Apostolic Palace, the site of all but five papal conclaves thereafter. The conclave was also the first to feature accessus voting (votes cast in accessit), derived from a practice of the Roman Senate, where a cardinal could change their vote after an unsuccessful scrutiny to any cardinal already receiving votes.

The early defeat of Greek Cardinal Basilios Bessarion—a potential compromise candidate between the Colonna and Orsini factions—is a notable display of the lingering antipathy towards certain characteristics of the Eastern church, such as bearded priests, centuries after the East-West Schism. Although Western canon law had prohibited beards for priests since at least the eleventh century, the issue would continue to be debated well into the sixteenth century.

== The election ==
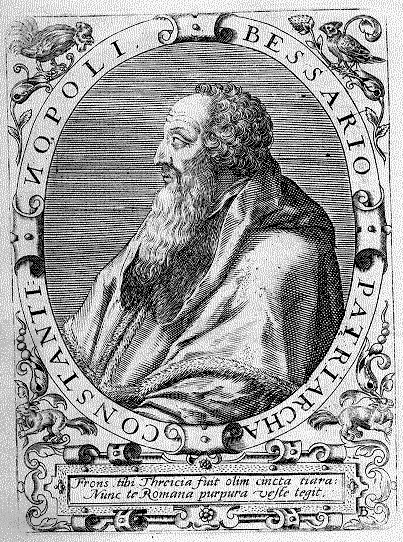
The bearded Basilios Bessarion

The two main factions of the cardinals were divided between the followers of cardinals Prospero Colonna (cardinal-nephew of Pope Martin V) and Cardinal Latino Orsini; among the papabile were Pietro Barbo, Basil Bessarion, Domenico Capranica, Orsini, and Ludovico Trevisan. Capranica received a plurality on the first three scrutinies, with the other votes scattered; Orsini and the French cardinals rallied against Capranica because he was close to Colonna.

On 6 April, Easter Sunday, the factions began to consider neutral candidates. In this capacity, Bessarion (noted for defecting from the Eastern Church following the East–West Schism) was able to receive eight votes before his candidacy was scuttled following a speech by Alain de Coëtivy—recorded by eyewitnesses—which emphasized Bessarion's former membership in the Eastern Orthodox Church and his retention of Greek mannerisms, such as a full beard. The French cardinal is reported to have remarked:

Shall we select for Pope, for head of the Latin Church, a Greek, a mere interloper? Bessarion still wears his beard—and forsooth, he is to be our Lord! How poor, then, must be our Latin Church, if we can find no worthy man in it, but must needs resort to a Greek, and to one, too, who but yesterday attacked the Roman faith! And because he has now returned shall he be our master and the leader of the Christian army? Behold, such is the poverty of the Latin Church that she cannot find an apostolic sovereign without resorting to a Greek! Oh, Fathers! Do what you think fit; but for myself and those who think with me, we will never consent to a Greek head of the Church!

Bessarion made no attempt to defend himself, claiming he was not interested in being elected; his reputations for reform and austerity also would have been unpopular with many of the Renaissance cardinals. Nevertheless, the renowned humanist scholar remained a strong candidate in the following 1464 conclave as well.

It is known that the early scrutinies the following Monday were disorganized; for example, the Minorite friar Antonio de Montefalcone received at least one vote. de Coëtivy and Trevisan pushed for Borja's election, gaining momentum until Borja prevailed the following Tuesday. The core of the requisite two-thirds majority was likely composed of the French, Spanish, and Venetian cardinals: Trevisan, de Coëtivy, Barbo, Orsini, d'Estaing, de Carvajal, Cerda, Rolin, and Torquemada; the vote of Isidore or Calandrini, or both, likely was also required as Borja very likely did not vote for himself; Borja almost certainly did not receive the votes of Colonna, Capranica, or Bessarion.

== Cardinal electors ==
Elector	Nationality	Order	Title	Elevated	Elevator	Notes
Giorgio Fieschi	Ligurian	Cardinal-bishop	Bishop of Palestrina	18 December 1439	Eugenius IV	Dean of the College of Cardinals; bishop of Albenga
Isidore of Kiev	Greek	Cardinal-bishop	Bishop of Sabina	18 December 1439	Eugenius IV	Archbishop of Ruthenia
Basilios Bessarion	Greek	Cardinal-bishop	Bishop of Frascati	18 December 1439	Eugenius IV	Latin Patriarch of Jerusalem; administrator of Mazara del Vallo; legate in Bologna
Alfons de Borja	Catalan	Cardinal-priest	Title of Ss. IV Coronati, bishop of Valencia	2 May 1444	Eugenius IV	Elected Pope Callixtus III
Juan de Torquemada, O.P.	Spanish	Cardinal-priest	Title of S. Maria in Trastevere	18 December 1439	Eugenius IV	
Ludovico Trevisan	Venetian	Cardinal-priest	Title of S. Lorenzo in Damaso, patriarch of Aquileia	1 July 1440	Eugenius IV	Camerlengo of the Holy Roman Church
Pietro Barbo	Venetian	Cardinal-priest	Title of S. Marco	1 July 1440	Eugenius IV	Future Pope Paul II; cardinal-nephew;bishop of Vicenza; archpriest of the Vatican Basilica
Juan Carvajal	Spanish	Cardinal-priest	Title of S. Angelo in Pescheria, bishop of Plasencia	16 December 1446	Eugenius IV	
Antoni Cerdà i Lloscos, O.SS.T.	Catalan	Cardinal-priest	Title of S. Crisogono, bishop of Lérida	16 February 1448	Nicholas V	
Latino Orsini	Roman	Cardinal-priest	Title of Ss. Giovanni e Paolo	20 December 1448	Nicholas V	Administrator of the see of Bari
Alain de Coëtivy	French	Cardinal-priest	Title of S. Prassede, bishop of Avignon	20 December 1448	Nicholas V	Administrator of the see of Nimes
Filippo Calandrini	Ligurian	Cardinal-priest	Title of S. Susanna, bishop of Bologna	20 December 1448	Nicholas V	Cardinal-nephew; camerlengo of the Sacred College of Cardinals
Guillaume d'Estaing, O.S.B.	French	Cardinal-priest	Title of S. Sabina	19 December 1449	Nicholas V	Bishop of Fréjus
Domenico Capranica	Capranica Prenestina	Cardinal-priest	Title of S. Croce in Gerusalemme, administrator of Fermo	23 July 1423 (in pectore, admitted into Sacred College on 30 April 1434)	Martin V (confirmed by Eugenius IV)	Protopriest; archpriest of the Lateran Basilica; grand penitentiary
Prospero Colonna	Roman	Cardinal-deacon	Deacon of S. Giorgio in Velabro	24 May 1426	Martin V	Protodeacon

=== Absentee cardinals ===
Elector	Nationality	Order	Title	Elevated	Elevator	Notes
Peter of Foix, O.F.M.	French	Cardinal-bishop	Bishop of Albano	September 1414	Antipope John XXIII	Legate in Avignon; administratort of the sees of Arles and Dax
Guillaume d'Estouteville, O.S.B.Clun.	French	Cardinal-bishop	Bishop of Porto e Santa Rufina, archbishop of Rouen	18 December 1439	Eugenius IV	Papal legate in France; archpriest of the Liberian Basilica; administrator of Saint-Jean-de-Maurienne
Peter von Schaumberg	Germany	Cardinal-priest	Title of S. Vitale, bishop of Augsburg	18 December 1439	Eugenius IV	
Dénes Szécsi	Hungarian	Cardinal-priest	Title of S. Ciriaco, archbishop of Esztergom	18 December 1439	Eugenius IV	Chancellor of the Kingdom of Hungary
Jean Rolin	French	Cardinal-priest	Title of S. Stefano al Monte Celio, bishop of Autun	20 December 1448	Nicholas V	
Nicholas of Kues	German	Cardinal-priest	Title of S. Pietro in Vincoli	20 December 1448	Nicholas V	Bishop of Brixen
