= Cardinals created by Nicholas V =

Catholic appointments from 1448 to 1449

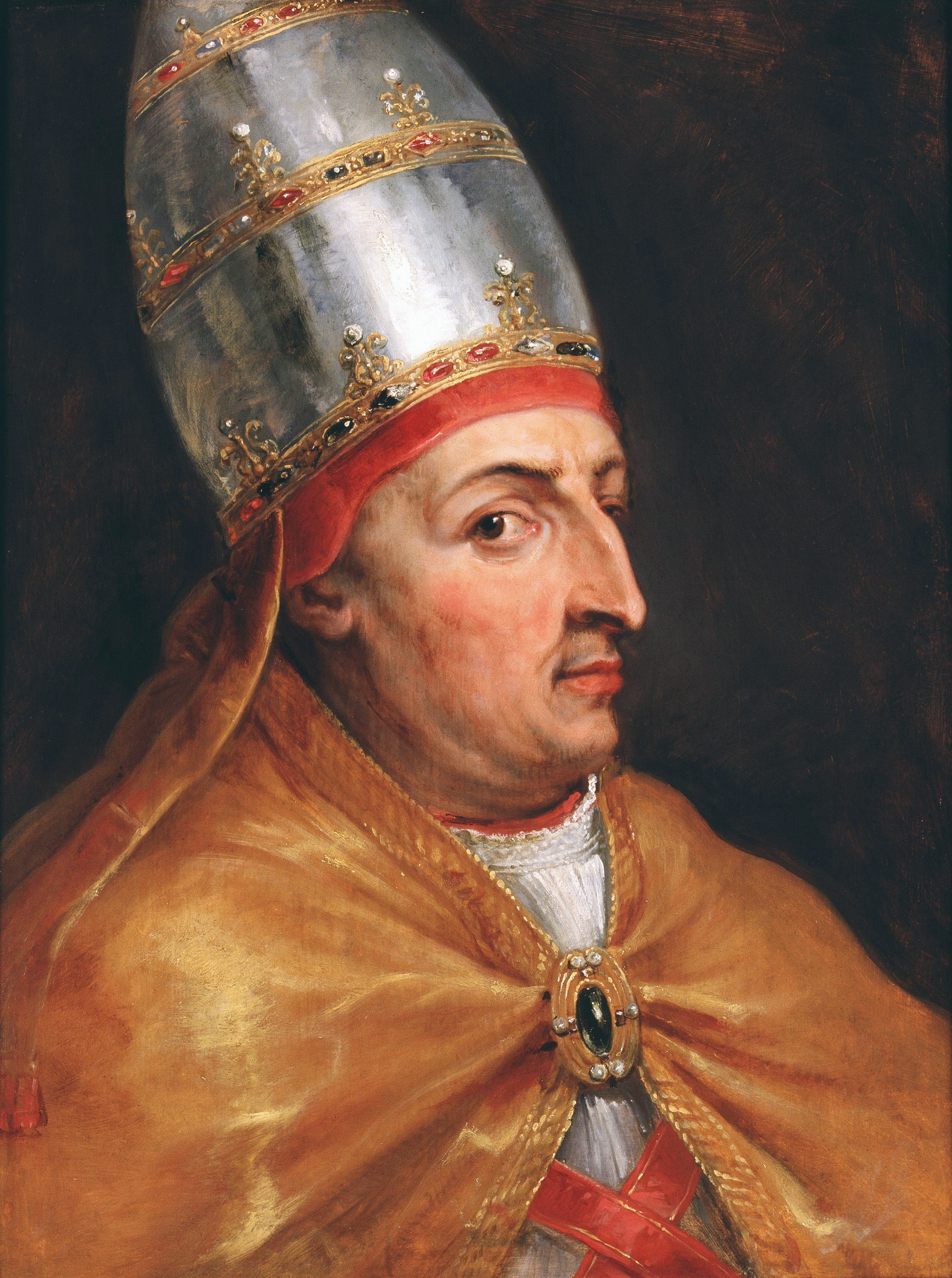
Pope Nicholas V (r. 1447–1455)

Pope Nicholas V (r. 1447–1455) created eight new cardinals in three consistories, including the former Antipope Felix V (r. 1439–1449). He also confirmed the three promotions made by this antipope, and restored two cardinals who were created by the legitimate popes but then deposed for having supported the schism of the Council of Basel and Antipope Felix V.

== 16 February 1448 ==
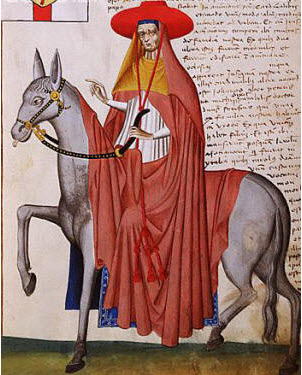
Antonio Cerdà i Lloscos (1390-1459).

1. Antonio Cerdà i Lloscos, O.S.S.T., archbishop of Messina – cardinal-priest of S. Crisogono, † 12 September 1459

== 20 December 1448 ==
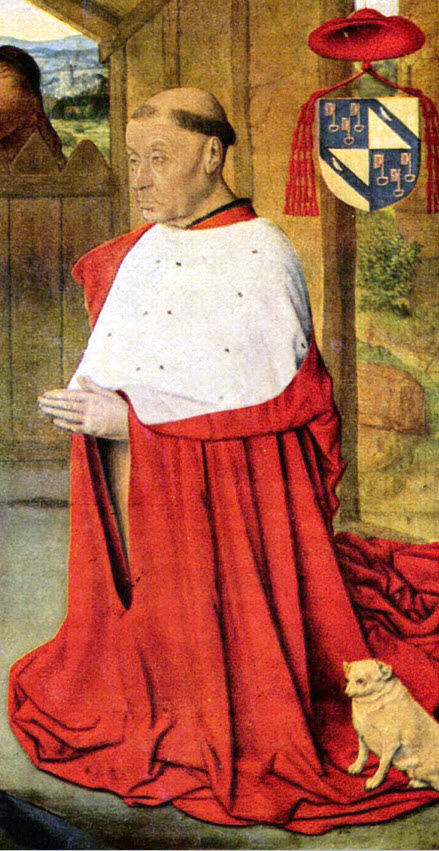
Jean Rolin (1408-83).

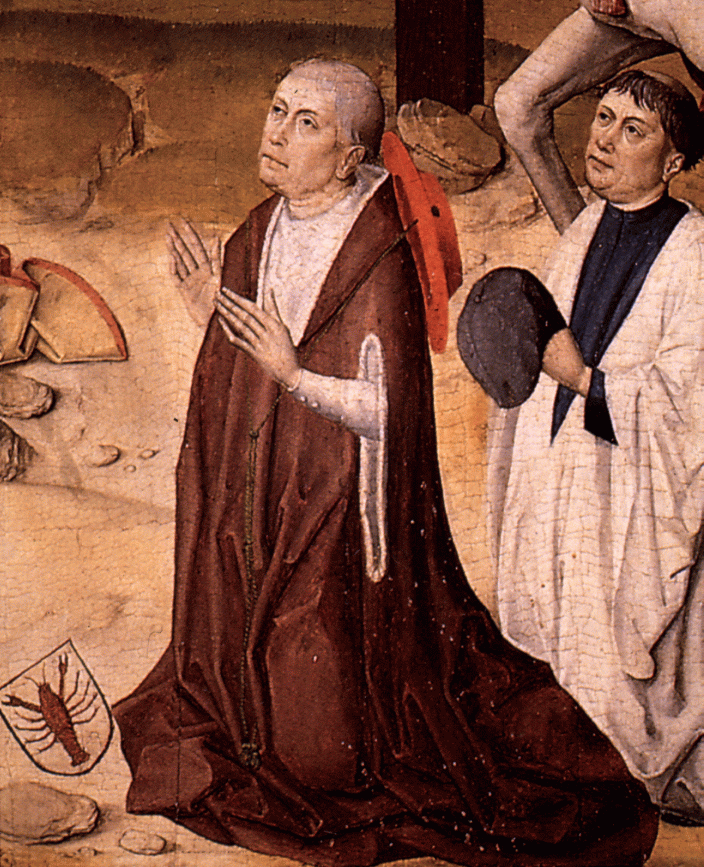
Nicholas of Cusa (1401-64).

All the new cardinals received their titular churches on 3 January 1449.

1. Astorgio Agnensi, archbishop of Benevento – cardinal-priest of S. Eusebio, † 10 October 1451
2. Latino Orsini, archbishop of Trani – cardinal-priest of SS. Giovanni e Paolo, then cardinal-bishop of Albano (7 June 1465), cardinal-bishop of Tusculum (14 October 1468), † 11 August 1477
3. Alain de Coëtivy, bishop of Avignon – cardinal-priest of S. Prassede, then cardinal-bishop of Palestrina (7 June 1465), cardinal-bishop of Sabina (11 December 1472), † 3 May 1474
4. Jean Rolin, bishop of Autun – cardinal-priest of S. Stefano in Montecelio, † 22 June 1483
5. Filippo Calandrini, bishop of Bologna – cardinal-priest of S. Susanna, then cardinal-priest of S. Lorenzo in Lucina (24 November 1451), cardinal-bishop of Albano (14 October 1468), cardinal-bishop of Porto e Santa Rufina (30 August 1471), † 18 July 1476
6. Nicholas of Cusa – cardinal-priest of S. Pietro in Vincoli, † 12 August 1464

== 23 April 1449 ==
1. Amadeo of Savoy, former Antipope Felix V (1439–1449) – cardinal-bishop of Sabina, † 7 January 1451

== Rehabilitations of the former supporters of Felix V ==
=== 6 September 1447 ===
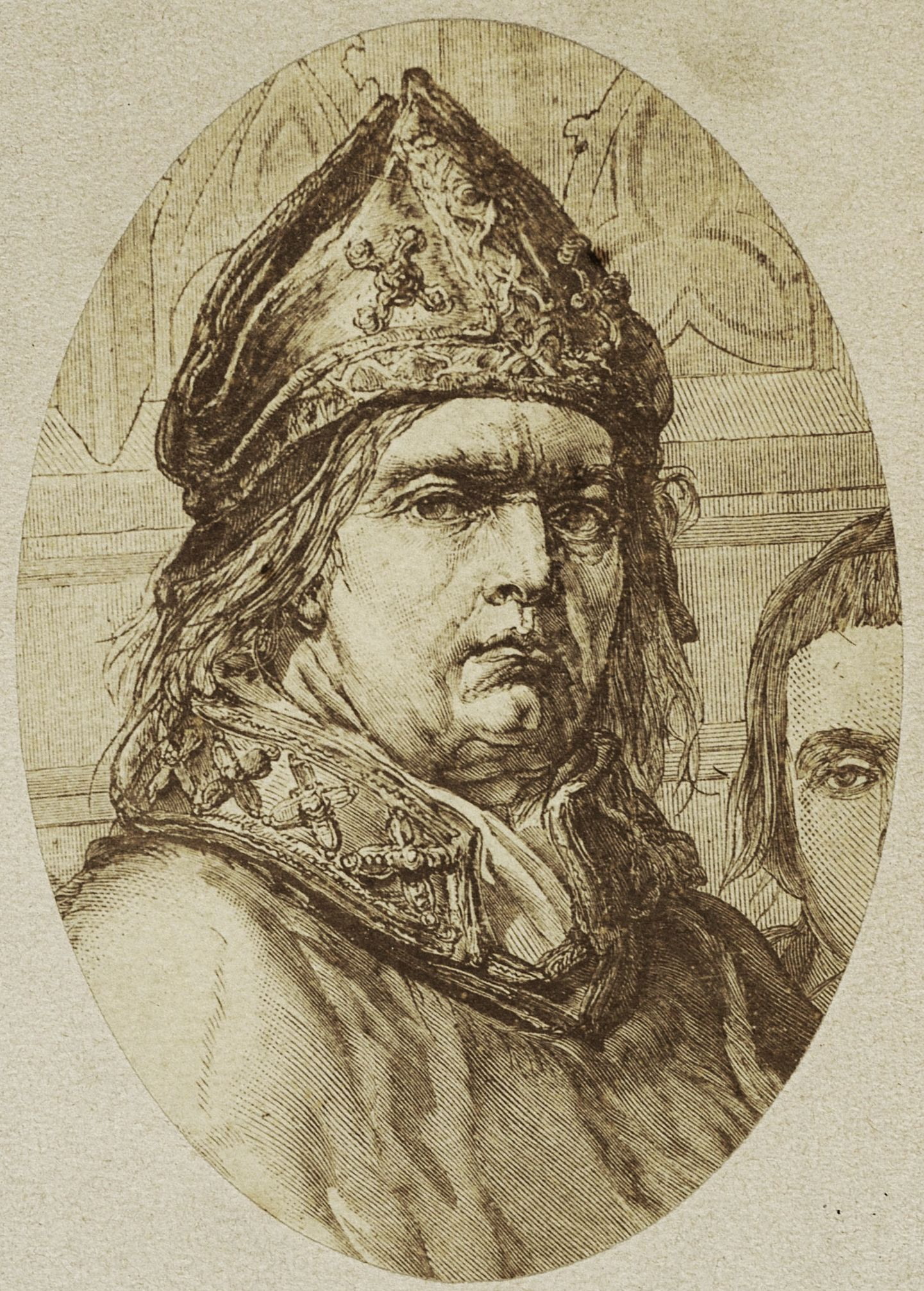
Zbigniew Oleśnicki (1389-1455).

1. Zbigniew Oleśnicki (first created on 18 December 1439 by Eugene IV), bishop of Kraków, in the obedience of Basle he was cardinal-priest of S. Anastasia – restored as cardinal-priest of S. Prisca († 1 April 1455)

=== 19 December 1449 ===
1. Louis Aleman, C.R.S.J. (first created on 24 May 1426 by Martin V), cardinal-priest of S. Cecilia and archbishop of Arles († 16 October 1450)
2. Jean d'Arces, archbishop of Tarentaise, created by Antipope Felix V as cardinal-priest of S. Stefano in Monte Celio (1444–1449) – cardinal-priest of SS. Nereo ed Achilleo (received the title on 12 January 1450), † 12 December 1454
3. Louis de La Palud, O.S.B., bishop of St.-Jean-de-Maurienne, created by Antipope Felix V as cardinal-priest of S. Susanna (1440–1449) – cardinal-priest of S. Anastasia (received the title on 12 January 1450), † 21 September 1451
4. Guillaume-Hugues d'Estaing, archdeacon of Metz, created by Antipope Felix V as cardinal-priest of S. Marcello (1444–1449) – cardinal-priest of S. Sabina (received the title on 12 January 1450), † 28 October 1455

== Sources ==
- Miranda, Salvador. "Consistories for the creation of Cardinals, 15th Century (1394-1503): Nicholas V (1447-1455)". The Cardinals of the Holy Roman Church. Florida International University. OCLC 53276621.
- Konrad Eubel, Hierarchia Catholica, vol. II, Münster 1914
- Krzysztof Rafał Prokop, Polscy kardynałowie, Kraków, Wyd. WAM, 2001
