= The Conclave =

2006 drama film about the 1458 Papal election

The Conclave Poster

The Conclave is a 2006 Canadian/German film production directed by Christoph Schrewe. The script was written by Paul Donovan and the main cast included Manu Fullola, Brian Blessed and James Faulkner.

== Plot ==
The plot centers on the conclave of 1458, which took place five years after the fall of Constantinople to the Turks. The story material was sourced from a diary written by Silvius Aeneas Piccolomini, the only cardinal to ever record the secret proceedings of a Papal conclave, and who was himself elected Pope Pius II in that Conclave. The Conclave hinges on the drama surrounding a 27-year-old Spaniard, Cardinal Rodrigo Borgia (later Pope Alexander VI), as he struggles to save both his career and his life.

== Cast ==
- Manuel Fullola as Rodrigo Borgia
- Brian Blessed as Aeneas Sylvius Piccolomini
- James Faulkner as Guillaume d'Estouteville
- Rolf Kanies as Basilios Bessarion
- Holger Kunkel as Alain de Coëtivy
- Peter Guinness as Latino Orsini
- Nicholas Irons as Prospero Colonna
- Brian Downey as Juan de Mella
- Lolo Herrero as Pedro Luis Borgia
- Gaetano Carotenuto as Captain Gaetono
- Matthias Koeberlin as Giuliano Della Rovere
- Nora Tschirner as Vannozza dei Cattanei
- Joseph Rutten as Pope Callixtus III
- Richard Donat as Pietro Barbo
- Lex Gigeroff as Isidore
- John Dunsworth as Filippo Calandrini

== See also ==
- List of historical drama films
