= 1458 conclave =

Election of Pope Pius II

Papal conclave August 1458

Dates and location
- 16–19 August 1458; Apostolic Palace, Papal States

Key officials
- Dean: Giorgio Fieschi
- Camerlengo: Ludovico Trevisan
- Protopriest: Petrus von Schaumberg
- Protodeacon: Prospero Colonna

Elected pope
- Enea Piccolomini; Name taken: Pius II
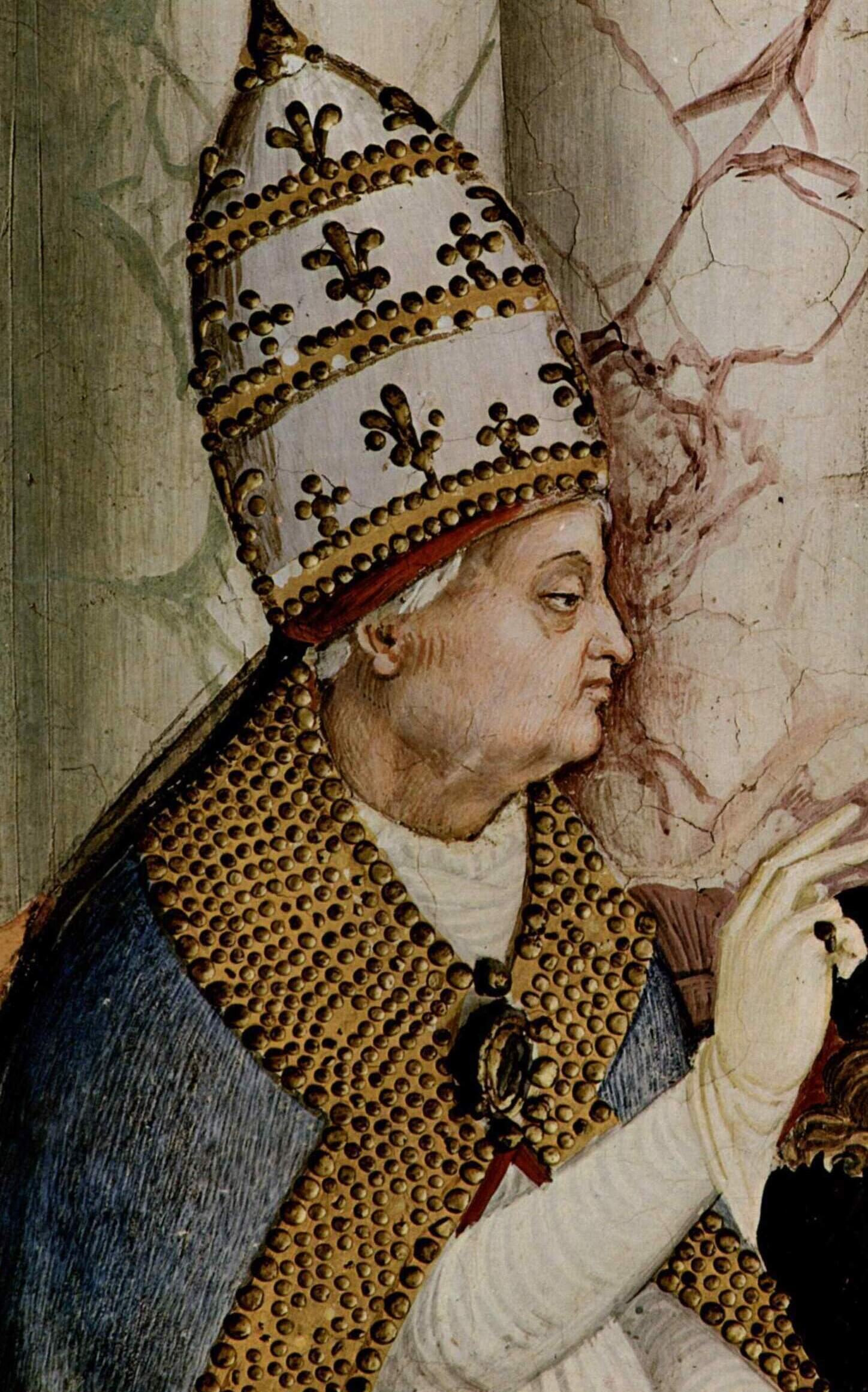

The 1458 papal conclave (16–19 August), convened after the death of Pope Callixtus III, elected as his successor Cardinal Enea Piccolomini, who took the name Pius II.

== Death of Callixtus III ==
Pope Callixtus III, the first pope of the House of Borgia, died on 6 August 1458. He was severely criticized due to his nepotism and devotion towards his compatriots of Catalonia, making him very unpopular among the rather xenophobic Roman populace. After the Pope's death an open revolt against him broke out and some of his partisans (e.g. his nephew Pedro Luis de Borja) had to flee Rome.

== List of participants ==
At the time of Callixtus's death, there were 27 living cardinals, of whom 19 were in Rome, but on 14 August, Cardinal Domenico Capranica, archpriest of the college, unexpectedly died. Participating in the conclave were 18 out of the 26 members of the Sacred College:

Elector	Nationality	Cardinalatial Title	Elevated	Elevator	Notes
Giorgio Fieschi (called Cardinal Fieschi)	Genovese	Bishop of Ostia e Velletri	1439, December 18	Pope Eugenius IV	Dean of the Sacred College of Cardinals; bishop of Albenga
Isidore of Kiev (Cardinal of Ruthenia)	Greek	Bishop of Sabina; administrator of SS. Marcellino e Pietro	1439, December 18	Pope Eugenius IV	Latin Patriarch of Constantinople; administrator of the see of Nicosia
Bessarion (Cardinal of Nicea)	Greek	Bishop of Frascati; commendatario of SS. XII Apostoli	1439, December 18	Pope Eugenius IV	Titular archbishop of Nicea and Tebe; administrator of the sees of Mazara del Vallo and Pamplona; Cardinal-protector of the Order of Basilians
Guillaume d'Estouteville, O.S.B.Cluny (Cardinal of Rouen)	French	Priest of SS. Martino e Silvestro	1439, December 18	Pope Eugenius IV	Archbishop of Rouen and administrator of the see of Saint-Jean-de-Maurienne; Archpriest of the patriarchal Liberian Basilica; Cardinal-protector of the Order of Augustinians
Juan de Torquemada, O.P. (Cardinal of S. Sisto)	Castilian	Priest of S. Maria in Trastevere	1439, December 18	Pope Eugenius IV	Administrator of the suburbicarian see of Palestrina; abbot commendatario of Subiaco
Pietro Barbo (Cardinal of S. Marco)	Venetian	Priest of S. Marco	1440, July 1	Pope Eugenius IV (cardinal-nephew)	Bishop of Vicenza; Archpriest of the patriarchal Vatican Basilica
Antonio de la Cerda (Cardinal of Messina)	Catalan	Priest of S. Lucia in Septisolio	1448, February 16	Pope Nicholas V	Bishop of Lerida; administrator of the see of Giovinazzo
Latino Orsini (Cardinal Orsini)	Roman	Priest of SS. Giovanni e Paolo	1448, December 20	Pope Nicholas V	Administrator of the see of Bari; Archpriest of the patriarchal Lateran Basilica
Alain de Coëtivy (Cardinal of Avignon)	French	Priest of S. Prassede	1448, December 20	Pope Nicholas V	Bishop of Avignon and administrator of the sees of Nîmes and Dol
Filippo Calandrini (Cardinal of Bologna)	Bolognese	Priest of S. Lorenzo in Lucina	1448, December 20	Pope Nicholas V (cardinal-nephew)	Bishop of Bologna
Luis Juan del Mila y Borja (Cardinal of Segorbe)	Catalan	Priest of SS. IV Coronati	1456, February 20	Pope Callixtus III (cardinal-nephew)	Administrator of the see of Segorbe; Legate in Bologna
Juan de Mella (Cardinal of Zamora)	Castilian	Priest of S. Prisca	1456, December 17	Pope Callixtus III	Bishop of Zamora
Giovanni Castiglione (Cardinal of Pavia)	Milanese	Priest of S. Clemente	1456, December 17	Pope Callixtus III	Bishop of Pavia
Enea Silvio Piccolomini (Cardinal of Siena)	Siena	Priest of S. Sabina	1456, December 17	Pope Callixtus III	Bishop of Siena and bishop of Warmia
Giacomo Tebaldi (Cardinal of S. Anastasia)	Neapolitan	Priest of S. Anastasia	1456, December 17	Pope Callixtus III	Archbishop of Naples; Camerlengo of the Sacred College of Cardinals
Prospero Colonna (Cardinal Colonna)	Roman	Deacon of S. Giorgio in Velabro	1426, May 24	Pope Martin V (cardinal-nephew)	Protodeacon of the Sacred College of Cardinals
Jaime de Portugal (Cardinal of Portugal)	Portuguese	Deacon of S. Eustachio	1456, February 20	Pope Callixtus III	Archbishop of Lisbon; administrator of the see of Paphos
Rodrigo Borgia (Cardinal Vicechancellor)	Catalan	Deacon of S. Nicola in Carcere; commendatario of S. Maria in Via Lata	1456, February 20	Pope Callixtus III (cardinal-nephew)	Vice-Chancellor of the Holy Roman Church; Administrator of Valencia; generalissimo of the papal troops

Eight electors were Italian, five Spaniards, two French, two Greeks and one Portuguese. Seven of them were created by Callistus III, six by Eugenius IV, four by Nicholas V and one by Martin V.

== Absentees ==
Eight cardinals did not participate in this conclave:

Elector	Nationality	Cardinalatial Title	Elevated	Elevator	Notes
Pierre de Foix, O.F.M. (Cardinal of Foix)	French	Bishop of Albano	September, 1414	Antipope John XXIII	Legate in Avignon; administrator of the sees of Arles, Lescar and Dax
Petrus von Schaumberg (Cardinal of Augsburg)	German	Priest of S. Vitale	1439, December 18	Pope Eugenius IV	Protopriest of the Sacred College of Cardinals; Bishop of Augsburg
Dénes Szécsi (Cardinal of Esztergom)	Hungarian	Priest of S. Ciriaco	1439, December 18	Pope Eugenius IV	Archbishop of Esztergom; Chancellor of the Kingdom of Hungary
Ludovico Trevisan (Cardinal of Aquileia)	Venetian	Priest of S. Lorenzo in Damaso	1440, July 1	Pope Eugenius IV	Camerlengo of the Holy Roman Church; Patriarch of Aquileia; bishop of Cava; papal legate of the Mediterranean coasts and islands; Supreme Commander of the Papal Fleet; abbot commendatario of Montecassino
Juan Carvajal (Cardinal of S. Angelo)	Castilian	Priest of S. Lucia in Septisolio	1446, December 16	Pope Eugenius IV	Bishop of Plasencia; papal legate in Germany, Poland and Hungary
Jean Rolin (Cardinal of Autun)	French	Priest of S. Stefano al Monte Celio	1448, December 20	Pope Nicholas V	Bishop of Autun
Nicholas of Cues (Cardinal of S. Pietro in Vincoli)	German	Priest of S. Pietro in Vincoli	1448, December 20	Pope Nicholas V	Bishop of Brixen; papal legate in Germany and England
Richard Olivier de Longueil (Cardinal of Coutances)	French	Priest [no titulus assigned]	1456, December 17	Pope Callixtus III	Bishop of Coutances

Of the absentee cardinals four were creations of Eugenius IV, two of Nicholas V and one of Callixtus III. Pierre de Foix was the last surviving cardinal of the Great Western Schism and was elevated by Pisan Antipope John XXIII.

Among them there were three French, two Germans, one Spaniard, one Italian and the one Hungarian.

== Candidates to the papacy ==
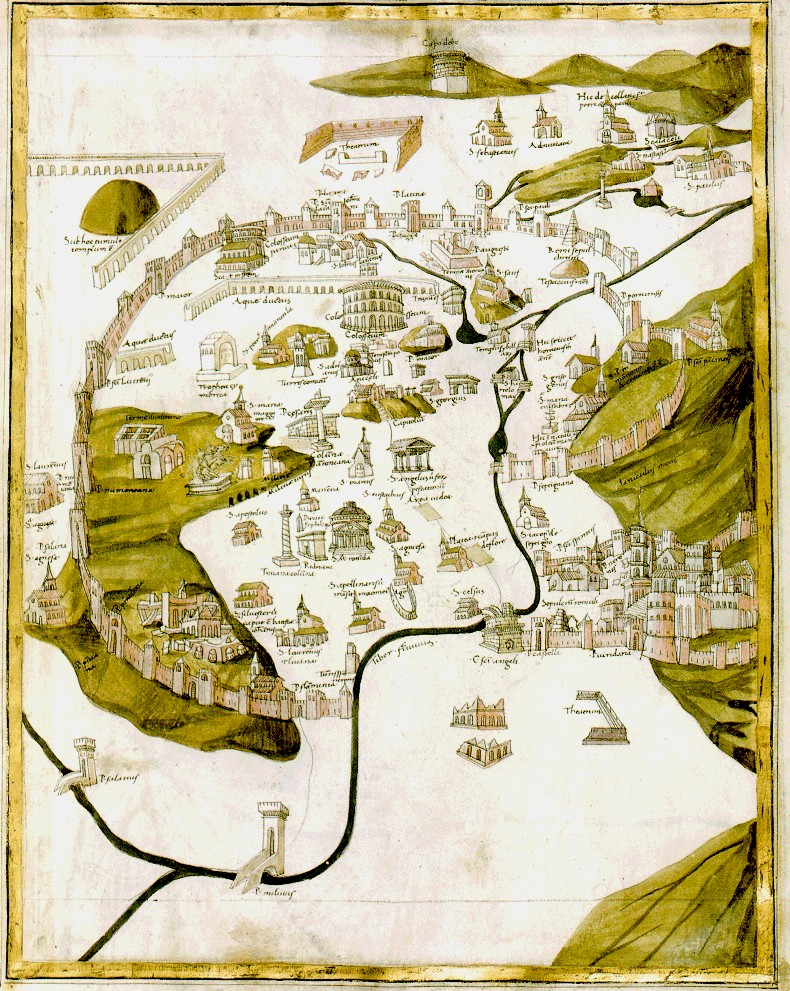
Map of Rome in 1471; the Vatican is at lower right.

The principal concerns in the conclave of 1458 arose from the rapid rise of the effective power and influence of the French monarchy in the closing years of the Hundred Years War, which had recently ended with the French victory. The principal Italian states – Kingdom of Naples, Republic of Genoa and Duchy of Milan – feared a rebirth of French interest in Italian affairs and tried to prevent the elevation of a French pope at all costs. The official candidate of the Milanese was Domenico Capranica. The campaign for his election in the pre-conclave period was so successful that it appeared almost certain that he would be elected to the papacy. But Cardinal Capranica died suddenly on August 14, 1458, two days before the beginning of the conclave, leaving his party in great confusion. Ottone de Carretto, ambassador of Milan in Rome, made the quick and unconsulted decision to support Cardinal Enea Piccolomini and managed to convince Latino Orsini, one of the most influential cardinals, to back him in this action. The principal candidate of the pro-French party was d'Estouteville. Bessarion, Torquemada and Calandrini also were considered papabile.

== The conclave ==
Eighteen cardinals entered the conclave in Vatican on August 16. Initially they subscribed to the conclave capitulation, which obliged the elect to continue the crusade against the Ottoman Empire and to give more welfare to poorer cardinals.

The first scrutiny took place only on August 18. Cardinals Piccolomini and Calandrini received five votes each, while none of the others obtained more than three. At this point French Cardinal d'Estouteville started an intensive simoniacal campaign for his own candidature. He promised the office of Vice-Chancellor to the Cardinal of Avignon and offered other bribes to the Greek cardinals. On August 18 in the evening he was certain that he would obtain at least eleven votes on the following morning. But the opposite Italian party also lost no time. During the night Cardinal Pietro Barbo called together all the other Italian cardinals except Prospero Colonna and proposed to them that, of them all, the one most likely to obtain the required majority of two thirds was Piccolomini, and that all should support him on the following day.

== Election of Pius II ==
The results of the second ballot on August 19 in the morning were a greatly disappointing surprise for d'Estouteville. He received only six votes – those of de Coëtivy, Colonna, Bessarion, Fieschi, Torquemada, and Castiglione. Cardinal Piccolomini obtained nine votes – those of Barbo, Orsini, Calandrini, Isidore of Kiev, de Mella, de La Cerda, Jaime de Portugal, del Mila y Borja, and that of d'Estouteville, who hesitated to vote for himself but certainly did not consider Piccolomini a serious rival. The votes of Rodrigo Borgia, Giacomo Tebaldi, and Enea Piccolomini fell to other candidates. After announcing the results, Cardinal Dean opened the customary procedure of the accessus. There was a long silence, broken by Rodrigo Borgia who changed his vote to Piccolomini. Then the partisans of d'Estouteville made an attempt to adjourn the session, but Cardinal Tebaldi also changed his vote to Piccolomini, who needed only one vote more for the election. At this point Cardinal Colonna arose to give his vote. Cardinals Rouen and Bessarion attempted to subdue him forcefully but Colonna was able to free himself from the scuffle to proclaim "I also vote for the Cardinal of Siena, and I make him Pope!" The rest of the adherents of the Cardinal of Rouen could do nothing but change their votes too, and a few minutes later Cardinal Bessarion congratulated Piccolomini on his unanimous election to the papacy.

Cardinal Enea Silvio Piccolomini accepted his election and took the name Pius II. On September 3, 1458, he was solemnly crowned on the steps of the patriarchal Vatican Basilica by Cardinal Prospero Colonna, protodeacon of S. Giorgio in Velabro.

== In popular culture ==
The proceedings of the election of Pius II were the basis of the 2006 film The Conclave.

== Sources ==
- Noel, Gerard (2006). The Renaissance Popes: Statesmen, Warriors and the Great Borgia Myth. New York: Carrol & Graf. ISBN 9780786718412.
- Salvador Miranda: conclave of 1458
- Francis Burkle-Young “Papal elections in the Fifteenth Century: the election of Pius II
- (in German) Vatican History: Konklave 1458
