= 1458 =

1458 in various calendars
- Gregorian calendar: 1458; MCDLVIII
- Ab urbe condita: 2211
- Armenian calendar: 907; ԹՎ ՋԷ
- Assyrian calendar: 6208
- Balinese saka calendar: 1379–1380
- Bengali calendar: 864–865
- Berber calendar: 2408
- English Regnal year: 36 Hen. 6 – 37 Hen. 6
- Buddhist calendar: 2002
- Burmese calendar: 820
- Byzantine calendar: 6966–6967
- Chinese calendar: 丁丑年 (Fire Ox); 4155 or 3948 — to — 戊寅年 (Earth Tiger); 4156 or 3949
- Coptic calendar: 1174–1175
- Discordian calendar: 2624
- Ethiopian calendar: 1450–1451
- Hebrew calendar: 5218–5219
- Hindu calendars
- Vikram Samvat: 1514–1515
- Shaka Samvat: 1379–1380
- Kali Yuga: 4558–4559
- Holocene calendar: 11458
- Igbo calendar: 458–459
- Iranian calendar: 836–837
- Islamic calendar: 862–863
- Japanese calendar: Chōroku 2 (長禄２年)
- Javanese calendar: 1374–1375
- Julian calendar: 1458; MCDLVIII
- Korean calendar: 3791
- Minguo calendar: 454 before ROC 民前454年
- Nanakshahi calendar: −10
- Thai solar calendar: 2000–2001
- Tibetan calendar: མེ་མོ་གླང་ལོ་ (female Fire-Ox); 1584 or 1203 or 431 — to — ས་ཕོ་སྟག་ལོ་ (male Earth-Tiger); 1585 or 1204 or 432

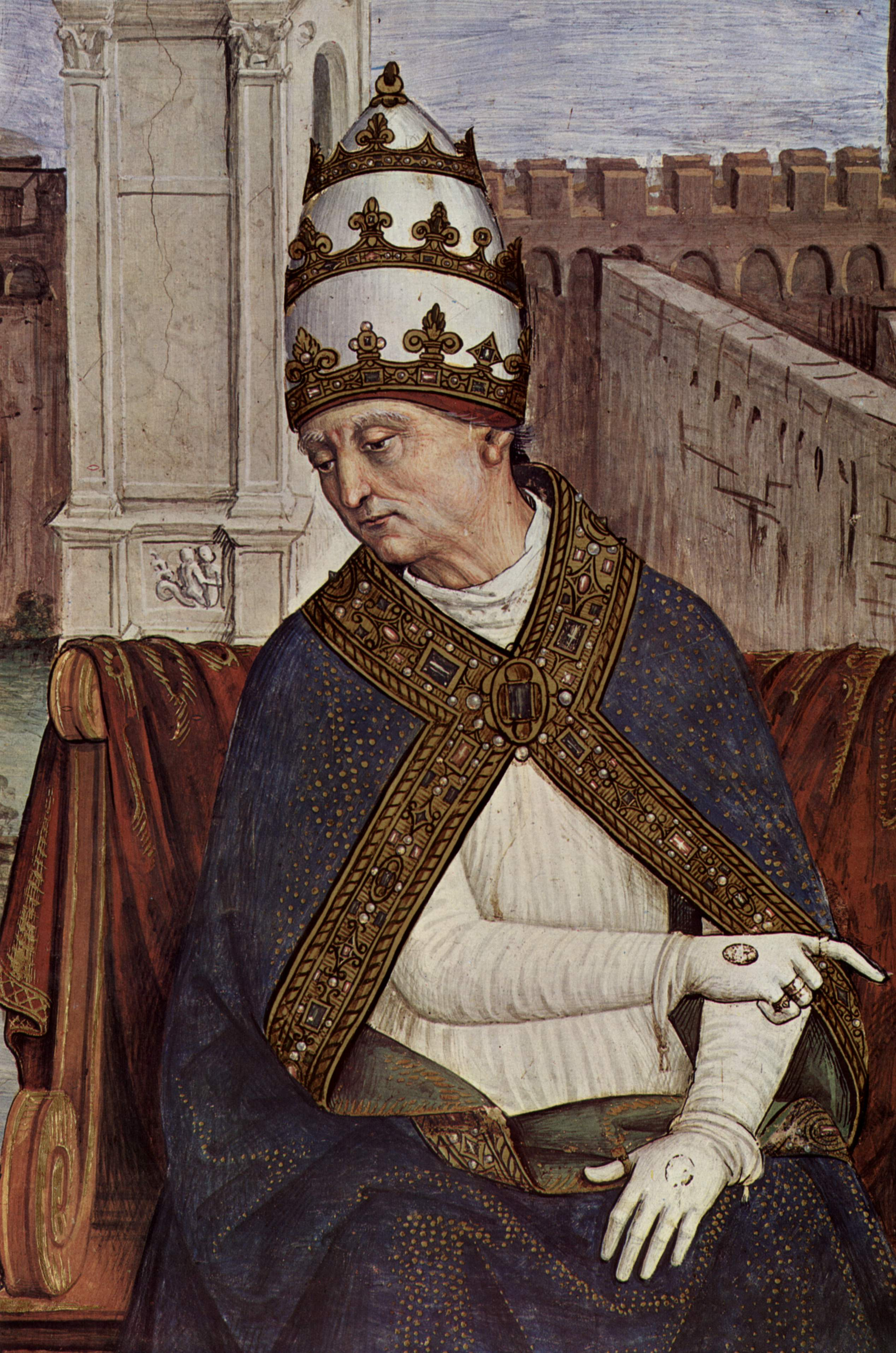
September 3: Pius II is crowned as the 210th Pope.

Year 1458 (MCDLVIII) was a common year starting on Sunday of the Julian calendar, the 1458th year of the Common Era (CE) and Anno Domini (AD) designations, the 458th year of the 2nd millennium, the 58th year of the 15th century, and the 9th year of the 1450s decade.

== Events ==
=== January–March ===
- January 24 – Matthias Corvinus becomes king of Hungary, at age 14.
- February 20 – Stefan Branković, blind since 1441, becomes the Despot of Serbia upon the death of his brother, Lazar Branković.
- February 27 – George of Poděbrady is elected king of Bohemia.
- March 25 – The Loveday is staged in London, by which Henry VI of England attempts to unite the warring factions who have triggered the Wars of the Roses.

=== April–June ===
- April 2 – George of Poděbrady (King Jiří z Poděbrad) receives the Crown of Saint Wenceslas at his coronation at the St. Vitus Cathedral in Prague as King of Bohemia.
- April 19 – In Bohemia, a group of Silesian princes and city rulers form an alliance against the new King, George of Podebrady. Within a year, the resistance is dropped and the Silesian princes pay homage to King George.
- April 20 – Isidore of Kiev is installed as the Latin Patriarchate of Constantinople, leader of Eastern Orthodox Christians in the Ottoman Empire, with the approval of the Muslim Ottoman Sultan, Mehmed II.
- May 6 – At Bidar in India, the Sultan of Bahmani, dies after a reign of 22 years and is succeeded by his son, Humayun Shah Zalim Bahmani.
- June 27 – Alfonso V of Aragon, King of Aragon in Spain since 1416 and King of Naples in Italy since 1442, dies at his home at the Castel dell'Ovo in Naples. By prior arrangement with his family, Alfonso is succeeded as King of Naples by his son, Fernando, popularly known in Naples as "Ferrante". At the same time, Alfonso's brother Juan, King of Navarre and King of Sicily, becomes the new King of Aragon.
- June – Francesco II Acciaioli, last Duke of Athens, surrenders the city to the Ottoman Empire and Sultan Mehmed II enters peacefully in August. Ottoman authorities issue a decree to protect the Acropolis.

=== July–September ===
- July 15 – Magdalen College, Oxford, is founded.
- August 6 – Pope Callixtus III dies after a reign of slightly more than three years.
- August 19 – The conclave to elect a new Pope concludes at the Apostolic Palace, with only 19 of the 27 members of the College of Cardinals participating. One of the electors, Cardinal Domenico Capranica appeared to be the most likely choice for Pope, but had died suddenly on August 14, two days before the conclave opened. On the first ballot on August 18, no candidate had more than five votes, but by the next day, Cardinal Enea Piccolomini, Archbishop of Siena, receives unanimous support after initially competing against Guillaume d'Estouteville and Filippo Calandrini. Piccoloni takes the name Pope Pius II as the 210th pope.
- September 3 – The coronation of Pope Pius II by Cardinal Prospero Colonna takes place on the front steps of St. Peter's Basilica in Rome.

=== October–December ===
- October 24 – King Afonso V of Portugal conquers the area around Ksar es-Seghir in the Sultanate of Morocco, led by Sultan Abd al-Haqq II.
- November 12 – (6th waxing of Nadaw 820 ME) Min Khayi, ruler of the Burmese Kingdom of Arakan leads a successful defense of an invasion from the Shan State by his son, Prince Min Swe.
- November 13 – Sultan Abd al-Haqq II of Morocco begins a 7-week siege of the Portuguese settlement of Alcácer-Ceguer, but is ultimately unsuccessful in recovering the captured territory.
- December 26 – François II becomes the new Duke of Brittany upon the death of his uncle Arthur de Richemont.

=== Date unknown ===
- The Jewish community is expelled from Erfurt (Germany); their houses are sold, and the synagogue turned into an arsenal.
- Moctezuma I, Tlatoani of Tenochtitlán, leads an expedition to the city-state Coixtlahuaca in Mixtec territory, but is defeated.
- A major volcano erupts.
- Magdalen College was founded in the University of Oxford, England.

== Births ==
- February 15 – Ivan the Young, Ruler of Tver (d. 1490)
- April 9 – Camilla Battista da Varano, Italian saint (d. 1524)
- April 13 – John II, Duke of Cleves (d. 1521)
- May 2 – Eleanor of Viseu, Portuguese princess and later Queen of Portugal (d. 1525)
- July 28 – Jacopo Sannazaro, Italian poet (d. 1530)
- August 18 – Lorenzo Pucci, Italian Catholic cardinal (d. 1531)
- October 3 – Saint Casimir, Prince of Poland and Duke of Lithuania (d. 1484)
- October 16 – Adolph II, Prince of Anhalt-Köthen, German prince (d. 1526)
- December 25 – Amago Tsunehisa, Japanese warlord (d. 1541)
- probable
  - Thomas Docwra, Grand Prior of the English Knights Hospitaller (d. 1527)
  - Jacob Obrecht, Dutch composer (d. 1505)

== Deaths ==
- January 17 – Louis I, Landgrave of Hesse, Landgrave of Hesse (1413–1458) (b. 1402)
- February 20 – Lazar Branković, Despot of Serbia
- March 25 – Íñigo López de Mendoza, 1st Marquis of Santillana, Spanish poet (b. 1398)
- April 11 – Helena Palaiologina, Queen of Cyprus (b. 1428)
- June 27 – King Alfonso V of Aragon (b. 1396)
- July 28 – John II of Cyprus
- August 6 – Pope Callixtus III (b. 1378)
- September 7 – Maria of Castile, Queen of Aragon, Queen consort of Aragon and Naples (b. 1401)
- December 26 – Arthur III, Duke of Brittany (b. 1393)
- date unknown – Isabelle Romée, mother of Joan of Arc
