= 1431 conclave =

Election of Catholic Pope Eugene IV

Papal conclave March 1431

Dates and location
- 2–3 March 1431; Santa Maria sopra Minerva, Papal States

Key officials
- Dean: Giordano Orsini
- Protopriest: Antonio Panciera
- Protodeacon: Alfonso Carrillo de Albornoz

Election
- Ballots: 1

Elected pope
- Gabriele Condulmer; Name taken: Eugene IV
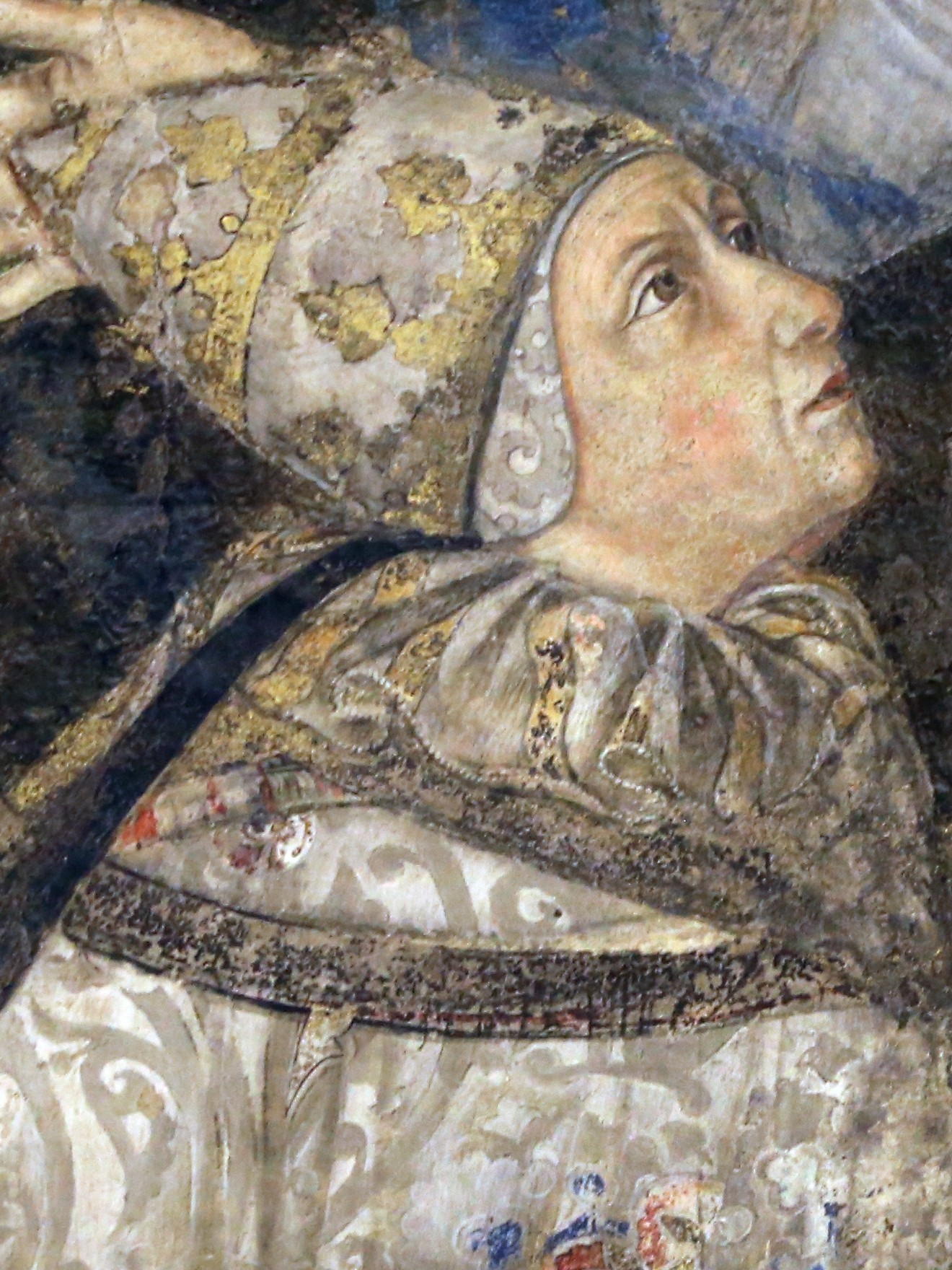

The 1431 papal conclave (2–3 March) convened after the death of Pope Martin V and elected as his successor Cardinal Gabriele Condulmer, who took the name Eugene IV. It was the first papal conclave held after the end of the Great Western Schism.

== List of participants ==
Pope Martin V died on 20 February 1431. At the time of his death, there were 20 publicly known members of the College of Cardinals, but only 18 were considered to be valid electors. Fourteen of them participated in the conclave:

Elector	Nationality	Cardinalatial Title	Elevated	Elevator	Notes
Giordano Orsini	Roman	Bishop of Albano	1405, June 12	Pope Innocent VII	Dean of the Sacred College of Cardinals; Grand penitentiary
Antonio Correr, O.C.R.S.A.	Venetian	Bishop of Porto e Santa Rufina	1408, May 9	Pope Gregory XII (Cardinal-nephew)	Archpriest of the patriarchal Vatican Basilica
Antonio Panciera	Friuli	Priest of S. Susanna	1411, June 6	Antipope John XXIII	Protopriest of the Sacred College of Cardinals; Administrator of the suburbicarian see of Frascati
Gabriel Condulmer, O.C.R.S.A. (elected Pope Eugene IV)	Venetian	Priest of S. Clemente	1408, May 9	Pope Gregory XII (Cardinal-nephew)	
Branda da Castiglione	Duchy of Milan	Priest of S. Clemente	1411, June 6	Antipope John XXIII	
Jean de La Rochetaillée	French	Priest of S. Lorenzo in Lucina	1426, May 24	Pope Martin V	Administrator of Rouen and of Besançon; Archpriest of the patriarchal Liberian Basilica
Louis Aleman, O.C.R.S.J.	French	Priest of S. Cecilia	1426, May 24	Pope Martin V	Administrator of Arles
Antonio Casini	Siena	Priest of S. Marcello	1426, May 24	Pope Martin V	Administrator of Grosseto
Juan de Cervantes	Castilian	Priest of S. Pietro in Vincoli	1426, May 24	Pope Martin V	Administrator of Tui
Alfonso Carrillo de Albornoz	Castilian	Deacon of S. Eustachio	1408, September 22	Antipope Benedict XIII	Protodeacon of the Sacred College of Cardinals; Archpriest of the patriarchal Lateran Basilica; Administrator of Osma and of Sigüenza
Lucido Conti	Roman	Deacon of S. Maria in Cosmedin	1411, June 6	Antipope John XXIII	Cardinal-protector of the Teutonic Order; Camerlengo of the Sacred College of Cardinals
Hugues Lancelot de Lusignan	Kingdom of Cyprus	Deacon of S. Adriano	1426, May 24	Pope Martin V	Administrator of Nicosia
Ardicino della Porta	Duchy of Milan	Deacon of SS. Cosma e Damiano	1426, May 24	Pope Martin V	
Prospero Colonna	Roman	Deacon of S. Giorgio in Velabro	1426, May 24, published on November 8, 1430	Pope Martin V (Cardinal-nephew)	

The Council of Constance confirmed the cardinals created by all three obediences of the time of the Schism. Seven participants were named cardinal by Pope Martin V, three by "Pisan" Antipope John XXIII, two by "Roman" Pope Gregory XII, one by "Roman" Pope Innocent VII and one by Antipope Benedict XIII of Avignon.

== Absentees ==
Four electors did not participate in this conclave:

Elector	Nationality	Cardinalatial Title	Elevated	Elevator	Notes
Pierre de Foix, O.F.M.	French	Cardinal-Priest of S. Stefano al Monte Celio	September, 1414	Antipope John XXIII	Legate in Avignon; administrator of Comminges
Niccolo Albergati, O.Carth.	Bolognese	Priest of S. Croce in Gerusalemme	1426, May 24	Pope Martin V	Administrator of Bologna; Papal legate in France
Henry Beaufort	English	Priest of S. Eusebio	1426, May 24	Pope Martin V	Administrator of Winchester; legate a latere in England
Giuliano Cesarini	Roman	Deacon of S. Angelo in Pescheria	1426, May 24, published on November 8, 1430	Pope Martin V	Papal legate in Germany

All the absentee electors were created by Martin V, except Pierre de Foix, who was elevated by Pisan Antipope John XXIII.

== Non-electors ==
Pope Martin V initiated the custom of creating cardinals without publishing their names at the time (similar to in pectore). At the time of his death the names of two of his secret nominees remained unpublished and, therefore, they were not regarded as members of the Sacred College. They were :

- Juan Casanova, administrator of Elne,
- Guillaume Ragenel de Montfort, bishop of Saint-Malo,

They both were later created again by Eugene IV.

However, two cardinals also created initially in pectore but later published were not allowed to participate in this conclave, because some necessary rites had not been accomplished at the death of Martin V:

Elector	Nationality	Cardinalatial Title	Elevated	Elevator	Notes
Domingo Ram, O.C.R.S.A.	Catalan	Priest of SS. Giovanni e Paolo	1426, May 24, published on November 8, 1430, but without finishing the rite of his investiture as cardinal	Pope Martin V	Administrator of Lerida
Domenico Capranica	Capranica Prenestina, Papal States	Deacon of S. Maria in Via Lata	1426, May 24, published on November 8, 1430, but without finishing the rite of his investiture as cardinal	Pope Martin V	Administrator of Fermo; Governor of Perugia and of the Duchy of Spoleto

== The election of Pope Eugene IV ==
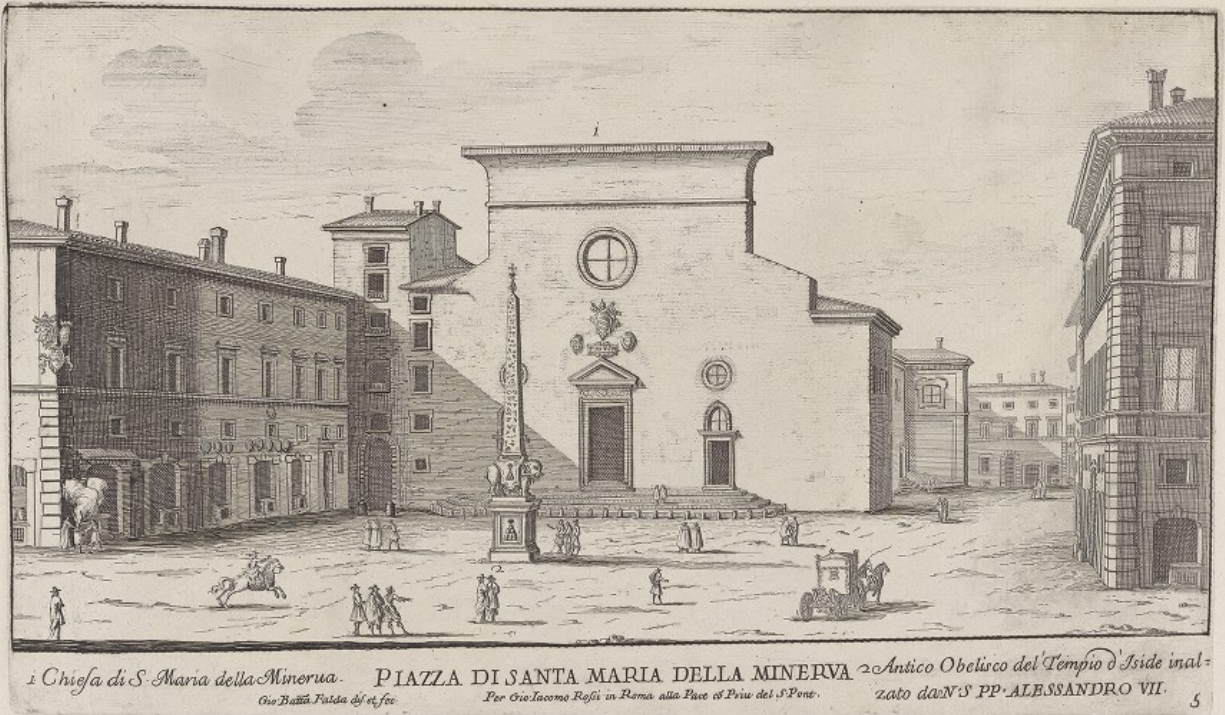
Santa Maria sopra Minerva, site of the 1431 conclave. (1665 drawing; the obelisk at centre was added in the 17th century)

The Mass of the Holy Spirit was sung on Thursday March 1, 1431 by Cardinal Giordano Orsini, the Bishop of Albano, prior Cardinalium. On March 2 all cardinals present in Rome entered the conclave in Santa Maria sopra Minerva. On 2 March, the electors prepared and subscribed the conclave capitulation. The terms of the Capitulation, which contained at least eight clauses, included:

- Half of papal revenue was to be shared with the College of Cardinals
- No major issues were to be decided without the consent of the College

The first scrutiny took place on the following day, 3 March, and ended with unanimous election of Cardinal Gabriele Condulmer, who took the name of Eugene IV. On Sunday 11 March he was solemnly crowned on the steps of the patriarchal Vatican Basilica by Cardinal Alfonso Carrillo de Albornoz of S. Eustachio, the Cardinal Protodeacon.

== Sources ==
- Francis Burkle-Young “Papal elections in the Fifteenth Century: the election of Eugenius IV
- Sede Vacante 1431
- Annales ecclesiastici
- Konrad Eubel: Hierarchia Catholica, Vol. I-II, Monasterium 1913–1914

== Bibliography ==
- F. Petruccelli della Gattina, Histoire diplomatique des conclaves Volume I (Paris: 1864), 236–252.
- William Cornwallis Cartwright, On the Constitution of Papal Conclaves (Edinburgh 1878) 125–129.
- Ferdinand Gregorovius, The History of Rome in the Middle Ages (translated from the fourth German edition by A. Hamilton) Volume 7 part 1 [Book XIII, Chapter 1] (London 1900) 22–26.
- Ludwig Pastor, History of the Popes (tr. R.F. Kerr) Volume I (St. Louis 1906).
- Peter Partner, The Papal State under Martin V (London 1958).
