= Guillaume-Hugues d'Estaing =

French Roman Catholic cardinal and bishop

Guillaume-Hugues d'Estaing (died 28 October 1455) (called the Cardinal of Metz) was a French Roman Catholic cardinal and bishop.

== Biography ==
Guillaume-Hugues d'Estaing was born in Étain, the son of Hugues d'Estaing. After becoming a doctor of both laws, he entered the Order of Saint Benedict. He was ordained as a priest and then became archdeacon of Verdun. He later became archdeacon of Metz.

He was in attendance at the Council of Basle (1431–43). In 1437, he was a member of the conciliar commission that reported on the poor governance of the church by Pope Eugene IV. In the papal conclave of 5 November 1439 he was one of the supporters of Antipope Felix V.

Antipope Felix V made him a pseudocardinal on 6 April 1444 in Geneva, offering him the titular church of San Marcello al Corso. Estaing refused Felix V's offer to make him a cardinal, instead choosing to side with Pope Nicholas V, who absolved him for his earlier support of Felix. In the consistory of 19 December 1449, Nicholas V made Estaing a cardinal priest, awarding him the titular church of Santa Sabina on 12 January 1450. Estaing entered Rome on 30 November 1450 and received the red hat the next day.

On 1 March 1451, he was elected Bishop of Sion, though a dispute with the cathedral chapter ultimately led to his resignation as bishop on 11 September 1454. He was present at the secret consistory of 27 October 1451. He served as Camerlengo of the Sacred College of Cardinals from November 1452 to 5 November 1453. On 27 June 1453, he was elected Bishop of Fréjus, holding this position until his death. He participated in the papal conclave of 1455 which elected Pope Callixtus III.

He died in Rome on 28 October 1455. He is buried in Santa Sabina.

Catholic Church titles
Preceded by Latino Orsini	Camerlengo of the Sacred College of Cardinals; 1452–1453	Succeeded by Alain de Coëtivy
