= Juan de Mella =

Spanish Roman Catholic bishop and cardinal

Cardinal Juan de Mella
- Cardinal-Priest
- Church: Santa Prisca (1456–1465); S. Lorenzo in Damaso (1465–1467)

Orders
- Created cardinal: 17 December 1456 by Pope Calixtus III

Personal details
- Born: 1397 Zamora, Spain
- Died: 12 October 1467 (aged 69–70) Rome
- Buried: S.Giacomo degli Spagnoli
- Occupation: canon lawyer
- Profession: bishop
- Education: Doctor in utroque iure
- Alma mater: University of Salamanca

Juan de Mella (1397 – October 12, 1467) (called the Cardinal of Zamora) was a Spanish Roman Catholic bishop and cardinal.

== Biography ==
Juan de Mella was born in Spain. His parents where nobleman, Fernando de Mella, notary of the episcopal curia and escribano de número of Zamora, and of his wife, Catalina de Alfonso. His brother Alfonso de Mella, O.Min., was a member of the Fraticelli.

In 1417, Juan began his studies at the Colegio Mayor de San Bartolomé at the University of Salamanca. There, he studied theology and canon law, becoming Baccalarius in decretis in 1412. He then obtained a doctorate in canon law, though the date of the degree is unknown. His tomb inscription appears to indicate that he was Doctor in utroque iure (Civil and Canon Law).

After obtaining his doctorate, Juan de Mella became a professor of canon law at the University of Salamanca. He was made Dean of Coria by 1421. He was also a prebendary and a member of the cathedral chapter of the Cathedral of Toledo.

=== Auditor of the Rota ===
During the pontificate of Pope Martin V, he traveled to Rome as Procurator of King John II to defend Archbishop Diego de Anaya before the papal court. Anaya had been excessively loyal to Benedict XIII and was in danger of being deposed. Anaya had also been the founder of the College of St. Bartholomew, of which Mella had been a member. Mella then remained in Rome throughout the papacy of Pope Eugene IV. The Kingdom of Castile, where Mella originated, remained loyal to Eugene, while the Crown of Aragon supported Antipope Felix V. Mella was one of the prelates who represented Pope Eugene as an envoy to and substitute president of the Council of Basel in 1432. He also delivered an oration to the council of behalf of the pope. At the end of 1432, Pope Eugene appointed Mella Auditor of the Roman Rota; he took his oath of office on 23 January 1433. He continued to exercise the function for forty years. The Pope also named him Archdeacon of Madrid.

Mella also served as regent of the Apostolic Penitentiary.

=== Bishop ===
On April 12, 1434, the cathedral chapter of the León Cathedral elected Mella Bishop of León, to replace Bishop Alfonso de Cusanca who had been transferred to the see of Osma. Bishop Cusanca, however, declined his transfer, leading to Juan de Mella being renamed Bishop of León on August 26, 1437. Throughout this period, however, he continued to reside in the Roman curia. In 1440 Jean de Mella became bishop of Zamora, a position he held until 1465.

Bishop Mella participated in the Council of Florence. He was a member of the commission that drafted the papal bull Laetentur Caeli, which attempted to reunite the Latin Church and the Greek Church. This bull resulted in the announcement of reunification at Florence Cathedral on July 6, 1439. Bishop-Elect de Mella signed the final decrees on 6 July 1439: Ego Ioannes de Mella confirmatus Legionen. subscripsi.

Mella was transferred to the see of Zamora on April 6, 1440, while his brother Fernando became auxiliary bishop and vicar general of León in his place. In Zamora Cathedral Mella endowed the chapel of San Ildefonso (now known as the capilla del cardenal after him) with five chaplaincies and an altar by Fernando Gallego.

In 1455, Bishop de Mella was in Wrocław, where he conducted a court case involving the Grand Master of the Teutonic Knights and his subjects, and found for the former. He and the Bishop of Wrocław received a letter from Pope Calixtus III ratifying their decision.

=== Cardinal ===
In the consistory of December 17, 1456, Pope Callixtus III made Mella a cardinal. He received the red hat and the titular church of Santa Prisca on December 18, 1456. Mella was known as the Cardinal of Zamora. In March 1465 he was transferred to the title of San Lorenzo in Damaso

Cardinal Mella participated in the papal conclave of 1458 that elected Pope Pius II. He later participated in the papal conclave of 1464 that elected Pope Paul II. Mella served as Camerlengo of the Sacred College of Cardinals in 1459. On May 20, 1465, Cardinal Mella was transferred to the see of Sigüenza, a post he held until his death.

Cardinal Juan de Mella died of the 'peste' (plague) in Rome on October 12, 1467. He was buried in San Giacomo degli Spagnoli, a church on the Piazza Navona that was replaced in the nineteenth century by Nostra Signora del Sacro Cuore because of its ruined condition. The cardinal's remains were transferred to Santa Maria in Monserrato degli Spagnoli. His tombstone inscription has been recorded:

IO·DE MELLA GENERE HISPANO FAMIL INGENVO
CAESAREI AC PONTIFICII IVRIS CONSULTISS S.
LAVR·IN DAMASO PBRO CARD·ZAMOREN
SACRVM
VIX·ANN·LXX·OBIIT XIII·OCTOBR·A SALVTE NRA MCCCCLX·VII·PONT·MAX·PAVLI·II·AN·QVARTO

== Books ==
- Beltrán de Heredia, Vicente (2001). Cartulario de la universidad de Salamanca (1218-1600) (in Spanish). Vol. Tomo I. Universidad de Salamanca. pp. 312–313, 523–524. ISBN 978-84-7800-954-1.
- Carabias Torres, Ana Maria (2005). "Salamanca, Académica palanca hacia el poder," in: Arana Pérez, Francisco José, ed. (2005). Letrados, juristas y burócratas en la España moderna (in Spanish). Univ de Castilla La Mancha. p. 28. ISBN 978-84-8427-381-3.
- Cardella, Lorenzo (1793). Memorie storiche de' cardinali della santa Romana chiesa (in Italian). Vol. Tomo terzo. Roma: Pagliarini.
- Eubel, Conradus, ed. (1914). Hierarchia catholica, Tomus 2 (second ed.). Münster: Libreria Regensbergiana. (in Latin)
- Ferreras, Juan de (1722). Historia de España: syglo XV : parte decima (in Spanish). Vol. Parte decima. Madrid: Francisco de el Hierro. pp. 32, 193.
- Kawasaki, Denise Hackett (2008). The Castilian Fathers at the Council of Basel. Ann Arbor MI USA. p. 169. ISBN 978-0-549-63604-5.
- Rezabel y Ugarte, José de (1805). Biblioteca de los Escritores que han sido Individuos de los seis Colegios Mayores (in Spanish). Madrid: Imprenta de Sancha. pp. 207–211.
- Rodríguez-San Pedro Bezares, Luis Enrique (2013). The University of Salamanca from the Middle Ages to the Renaissance: 1218-1516/29 : Historical, Aspects, Power and Knowledge. Ediciones Universidad de Salamanca. pp. 50–51, 130–131. ISBN 978-84-9012-339-3.
- Stieber, Joachim W. (1978). Pope Eugenius IV, the Council of Basel and the Secular and Ecclesiastical Authorities in the Empire: The Conflict Over Supreme Authority and Power in the Church. Boston-Leiden: Brill. p. 17. ISBN 90-04-05240-2.

Catholic Church titles
Preceded by Giacomo Tebaldi	Camerlengo of the Sacred College of Cardinals; 1459	Succeeded by Pietro Barbo
