= Astorgio Agnensi =

Italian Roman Catholic bishop and cardinal

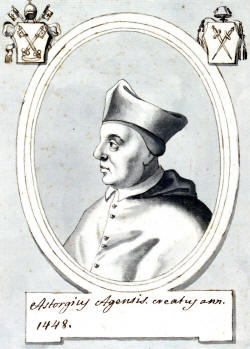
Astorgio Agnensi

Astorgio Agnensi (1391–1451) was an Italian Roman Catholic bishop and cardinal, multiple papal governor and multiple Curiate official.

== Biography ==
Astorgio Agnensi was born in Naples in 1391. He was elected Bishop of Mileto on 18 September 1411. He was transferred to the see of Ravello on 15 February 1413; to the see of Melfi on 25 January 1418; and then to the see of Ancona on 6 March 1419. On 22 August 1422 he was transferred to the see of Ascoli Piceno but refused; then, on 19 October that year, the see of Umana was united with that of Ancona.

Agnensi then moved to Rome, becoming apostolic treasurer. From August 1426 to April 1427, he was the papal governor of the Duchy of Spoleto and the March of Ancona. He and Barthélémy Texier, Master of the Order of Preachers, were sent to the see of Iesi to deal with the heretics of the Fraticelli. On 8 February 1436 he was promoted to the see of Benevento; he occupied this position until his death.

On 26 March 1442 Pope Eugene IV named him his vicar in spiritualibus and governor of Rome, a post he held until 1447. He was also the apostolic administrator of the see of Canne from 16 June 1445 until 25 May 1449. In September 1447, he became papal governor of Bologna. He was Vice-Chancellor of the Holy Roman Church during the papacy of Eugene IV. Pope Nicholas V made him a cardinal in the consistory of 20 December 1448. He received the titular church of Sant'Eusebio on 3 January 1449, and the red hat on 6 January 1449. He was Camerlengo of the Sacred College of Cardinals from 27 October 1449 until 1450.

He died in Rome on 10 October 1451. He is buried in the cloister of Santa Maria sopra Minerva.

Catholic Church titles
Preceded by Domenico Capranica	Camerlengo of the Sacred College of Cardinals; 1449–1450	Succeeded by Isidore of Kiev
