= Antonio Cerdà i Lloscos =

Spanish Roman Catholic bishop and cardinal

His Eminence Antonio Cerdà i Lloscos
- Bishop of Lleida
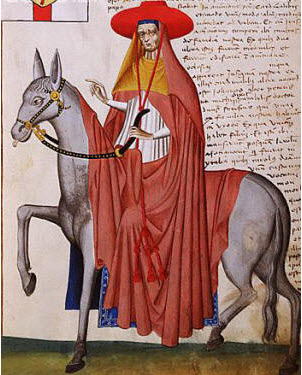
- Cardinal Cerdà
- Church: Catholic Church
- Diocese: Diocese of Lleida
- Installed: 28 March 1449
- Term ended: 12 September 1459
- Predecessor: García Aznárez de Añon
- Successor: Luis de Milà y de Borja
- Other posts: Cardinal-Priest of San Crisogono (1448-1459); Administrator of Ravenna (1455-1459)
- Previous posts: Archbishop of Messina (1447–1449); Administrator of Giovinazzo (1455-1458); Camerlengo of the Sacred College of Cardinals (1456)

Orders
- Created cardinal: 16 February 1448 by Pope Nicholas V
- Rank: Cardinal-Priest

Personal details
- Born: Antonio Cerdà i Lloscos; 1390 Santa Margalida, Mallorca
- Died: 12 September 1459 (aged 68–69) Rome, Papal States
- Buried: St. Peter's Basilica

Antonio Cerdà i Lloscos (1390 – 12 September 1459) (called the Cardinal of Messina or the Cardinal of Lleida (a.k.a. Lérida)) was a Spanish Roman Catholic bishop and cardinal.

== Biography ==
Antonio Cerdà i Lloscos was born in Santa Margalida in 1390. He studied humanities at Palma, Majorca and then attended the University of Lleida, receiving a doctorate in Christian theology.

After he was ordained as a priest, he became a canon of Palma Cathedral. He joined the Trinitarian Order at the monastery of the Holy Spirit in Mallorca. He later became professor of moral theology, Scholastic theology, Sacred Scripture, and canon law at the University of Lleida. As first definitor of the Trinitarian Order, he attended the General Chapter of the order held in Amiens on 4 April 1429. After redacting the Trinitarian Order's new constitutions, he spent two years visiting the Trinitarian convents in the Kingdom of England, the Lordship of Ireland, and the Kingdom of Scotland, and later in Spain and Italy as well. The Roman Curia then named him procurator general of his order.

Pope Eugene IV brought Cerdà into the papal household, making him his privy chamberlain. He soon became auditor of the Roman Rota. Pope Nicholas V later named him as the pope's counselor in matters of theology and philosophy.

Upon the recommendation of Alfonso V of Aragon, he was elected Archbishop of Messina on 8 July 1447, with Pope Nicholas V confirming the election on 8 January 1448. He also became commendatory abbot of Valldigna. Bishop Cerdà did not participate in the Council of Florence (1431–49).

Pope Nicholas V made Cerdà a cardinal in the consistory of 16 February 1448. He received the red hat and the titular church of San Crisogono on 17 February 1448.

He was translated to the see of Lleida on 28 March 1449; he took possession of the see by a procurator and continued to reside in Rome. On 29 April 1449 he resigned as commendatory abbot of Valldigna. He attended the secret consistory of 27 October 1451, and later participated in the papal conclave of 1455 that elected Pope Callixtus III.

He served as apostolic administrator of the see of Giovinazzo from 6 June 1455 until 1458, and as administrator of the Archdiocese of Ravenna from 28 June 1455. He served as Camerlengo of the Sacred College of Cardinals for the year 1456. As legate in the Marche, he helped conclude the peace negotiations between the Republic of Florence and Alfonso V of Aragon.

He was present at the death of Pope Callixtus III on 6 August 1458. He then participated in the papal conclave of 1458 that elected Pope Pius II.

He died in Rome on 12 September 1459. He is buried in St. Peter's Basilica.

Catholic Church titles
Preceded by Filippo Calandrini	Camerlengo of the Sacred College of Cardinals; 1456	Succeeded by Enea Silvio Piccolomini
