= Giorgio Fieschi =

Italian cardinal

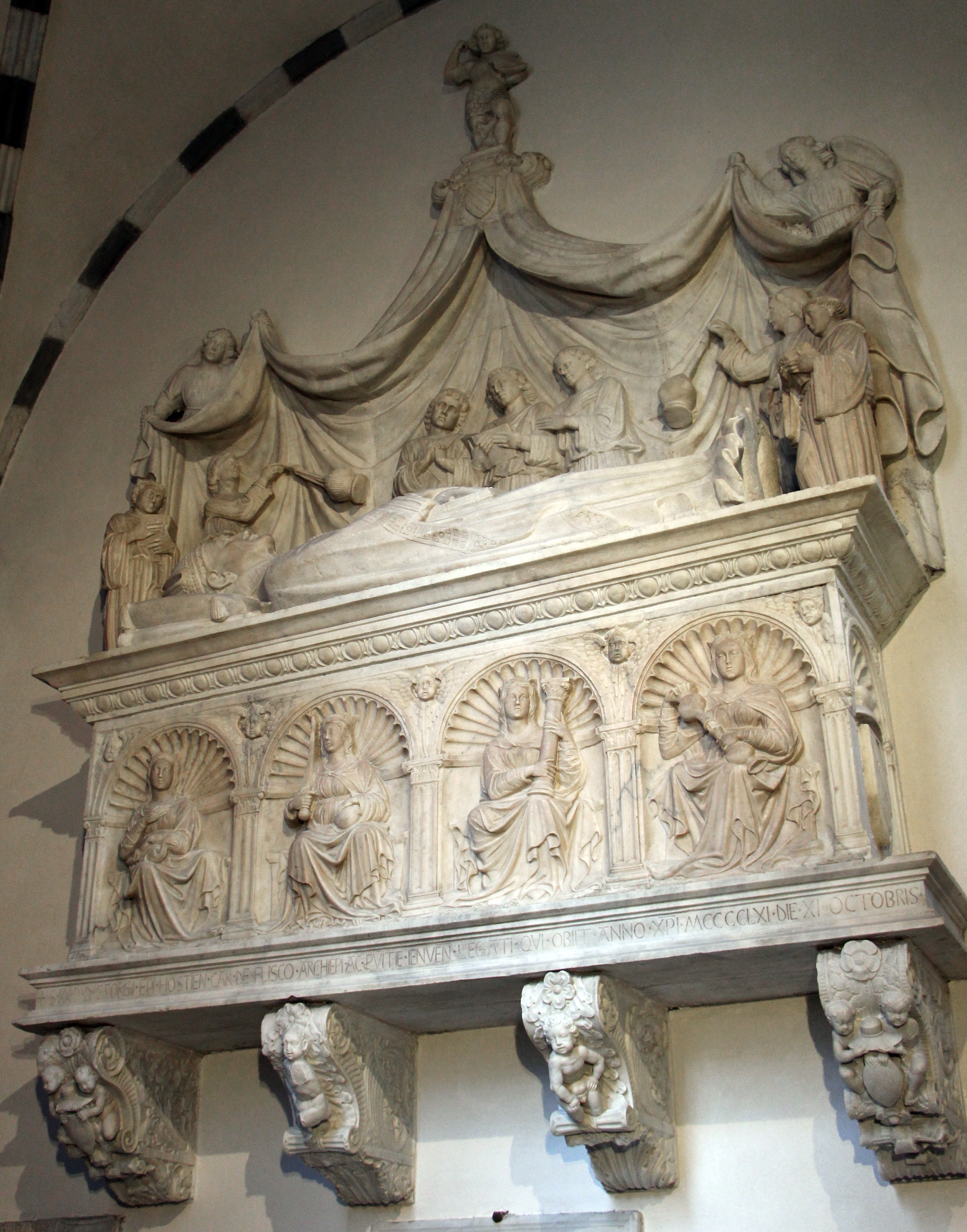
Tomb

Giorgio Fieschi (ca. 1395 – October 1461) was an Italian cardinal, of the counts of Lavagna.

After studying civil and canon law in Bolgna, he was elected Bishop of Mariana, in Corsica, on 27 May 1433. On 3 October 1436 he was transferred to the metropolitan see of Genoa, which he occupied until 18 December 1439, when Pope Eugenius IV raised him to the cardinalate in order to secure the support of Republic of Genoa in the conflict with antipope Felix V.

He was bishop in commendam of Sagona (1443–45), bishop of Noli (1447–48) and bishop of Albenga (1448–59). He was administrator of the see of Luni, 1446.

He was promoted to the suburbicarian see of Palestrina on 5 March 1449. He acted as papal legate in Liguria in the pontificate of Pope Martin V. As dean of the Sacred College of Cardinals, he opted for the suburbicarian see of Ostia (proper of the dean) on 28 April 1455.

He participated in the conclave of 1455 which elected Pope Callixtus III and the conclave of 1458 which elected Pius II.

He died in Rome on 8 or 11 October 1461 and was buried at the mausoleum in the chapel of S. Giorgio in Genoa.

Catholic Church titles
Preceded by Juan de Torquemada	Camerlengo of the Sacred College of Cardinals; 1447	Succeeded by Domenico Capranica
