= Prospero Colonna (cardinal) =

Prospero Colonna (c. 1410–1463) was a cardinal-nephew of Pope Martin V (Odo Colonna), whose election ended the Western Schism. Colonna was excommunicated for a period due to his rebellion against Martin V's successor, Pope Eugene IV, becoming one of the few excommunicated cardinals. Despite this, Colonna was the leading candidate to succeed Eugene IV in the papal conclave, 1447, where he was two votes away from election for the first three days.

Colonna is also known as a patron of Roman humanism.

== Early life ==
Colonna was born circa 1410, the fifth child of Count Lorenzo Onofrio Colonna of Alba and Sveva Caetani, of the signoria of Sermoneta, two of the great baronial families of Rome. Colonna was an apostolic notary and, at the age of 11, made a canon of the cathedral of Liège in 1421, losing the title for a time and regaining it in 1426. In the same year 1426 he became provost of the St. Martin's Cathedral of Utrecht.

Colonna was also the Archdeacon of Canterbury from June 1424 to December 1434, appointed by Martin V, his uncle. Colonna claimed several ecclesiastical revenue streams in England, including the prebend of Laughton, York, worth an estimated £33 per annum, a matter of dispute between Colonna and Thomas Chapman, as well as Chapman's successor John Lax. Colonna acquired other English benefices at a time when the right of the pope to appoint English bishops was a matter of controversy.

== Cardinalate ==
Colonna was created cardinal-deacon in pectore on 24 May 1426, although his elevation was not published until November 8, 1430.

=== Conclave of 1431 ===
After the death of Martin V, the papal conclave, 1431 was the last to involve the participation of cardinals elevated by antipopes. Pope Eugene IV was elected, and Prospero joined the rest of the Colonna family in rebellion against the new pontiff, who proceeded to deprive the cardinal of all of his benefices. Colonna, with the aid of his baronial relatives carried off much of the papal treasure, and was excommunicated by Eugene IV prior to his disgorgement. Henry Chichele used the unrest in Rome as an excuse to deprive Colonna of the archdeaconry of Canterbury.

As the forces of the Colonna, joined by those of the Savelli family and the Kingdom of Naples, massed outside Rome, Colonna slipped quietly out of the city at night to join the forces of rebellion. On 22 May in Paliano, Colonna received command of the garrison of the Duke of Calabria, Louis III of Naples, who was commanding the Neapolitan troops outside the walls of Rome. The forces entered the city on 30 May but were driven back by the efforts of the Orsini family and Girolamo Riario.

=== Conclave of 1447 ===
By then the protodeacon of the College of Cardinals, Colonna was the leading papabile in the papal conclave, 1447, receiving 10 votes on the first scrutiny (two short of the required supermajority), and continuing to receive 10 for the first three days of voting, as Enea Silvio Piccolomini recorded. Colonna had the support of the French cardinals and those who were impressed with the clout he carried with the various Italian city-states, but did not have the support of two outspoken opponents and close collaborator of the late Eugenius, Cardinal Giovanni Berardi, called Cardinal of Taranto, with family connections to the Orsini, and Francesco Condulmer, a nephew; nor did he have the confidence of the Roman public, due to Colonna's reputation for extrajudicial violence. Domenico Capranica unsuccessfully spoke in favor of Colonna, referring to him as "mansuetto agnello" (mild as a lamb). Pope Nicholas V, the candidate ultimately selected, reinstated all of Colonna's benefices.

=== Conclave of 1458 ===
Colonna cast the deciding vote in the papal conclave, 1458, that elected Enea Silvio Piccolomini Pope Pius II, stating "I also vote for the Cardinal of Siena, and make him pope". The aged Colonna changed his vote to Piccolomini by accessus after cardinals Guillaume d'Estouteville and Basilios Bessarion attempted to remove him from the room by force.

== As a patron ==
In Rome, Cardinal Colonna, a leader among the Roman humanists during the first, brief flowering of Renaissance in Rome, possessed the "Torre di Nerone" on the Quirinal Hill, at the time a somewhat isolated structure, and the gardens that surrounded it, identified with the Orti Neroniani by Flavio Biondo. Lorenzo Valla was in Colonna's entourage, and Poggio Bracciolini dedicated Da avaritia to him, a book that, in spite of its title, expanded upon the joyous uses of riches. Another Colonna protégé, the humanist Flavio Biondo, records the restorations and excavations undertaken in the gardens, noting the discovery of extensive marble floors and other remains. Fra Giocondo remarked on the famous collection of Roman marbles at Casa Colonna, which included the torso of Hercules later made famous as the Belvedere Torso and perhaps the Three Graces now at Siena. Biondo was inspired to begin his Roma instaurata, the first archaeological topology of ancient Rome, in Colonna's company, when they were on a trip to view the Roman theater at Albano; Biondo refers to Colonna as alter nostri saeculi Maecenas, "for our times another Maecenas", in part for his restorations to his titular church, San Giorgio in Velabro, now largely effaced by modern restorations intended to recapture its medieval ambience. The Cardinal commissioned Leon Battista Alberti to raise the Roman ship that was known to lie in the bottom of Lake Nemi; the undertaking, which was not successful, furnished the subject of an essay by Alberti, which has not survived. The antiquarian Ciriaco d'Ancona fondly recalled the hospitality of Cardinal Colonna and his kinsmen, which identified Colonna's association with the current of renovation that was under weigh in early Renaissance Rome.

Colonna died on 24 March 1463 and was buried in Santi Apostoli, Rome.

== See also ==
- List of cardinal-nephews
- List of cardinals excommunicated by the Catholic Church
- List of papal elections

== Notes ==
Catholic Church titles
Preceded by Domenico Capranica	Camerlengo of the Sacred College of Cardinals; 1439	Succeeded by Guillaume d'Estouteville
