= Filippo Calandrini =

Italian Roman Catholic cardinal

Filippo Calandrini (1403 – 18 July 1476) was an Italian Roman Catholic cardinal and half-brother of Pope Nicholas V.

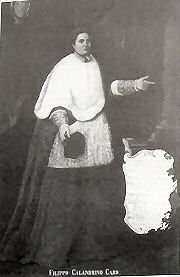
Filippo Calandrini

== Biography ==
He was born in 1403 in Genoese Sarzana (now in the region of Liguria), a town located in ancient Lunigiana, a key border region which Tuscans and Ligurians long struggled to control. His father was Tommaso Calandrini from a family originating from Lucca, his mother was the latter's second wife Andreola Tomeo dei Bosi, the widow of Bartolomeo Parentucelli, whose son Tommaso Parentucelli became pope Nicholas V. from 1447 until 1455. Filippo Calandrini's cousin Isabella Calandrini had married the later mayor of Sarzana and commissioner of the Lunigiana, Giovanni Buonaparte in 1397, becoming direct ancestors of Napoleon.

He was named a canon and archdeacon of Lucca in 1440. Filippo was elected camerlengo of the cathedral chapter in 1442. Calandrini became a protonotary apostolic in 1447.

When his brother became pope, he named Filippo bishop of Bologna in 1447. In 1448, he was named cardinal Priest of Santa Susanna, his former titular church. Filippo also became cardinal of Bologna, cardinal Priest of San Lorenzo in Lucina, cardinal bishop of Albano (1468–1471), and finally on 30 August 1471, cardinal bishop of Porto e Santa Rufina. Calandrini participated in the conclaves of 1455, 1458, 1464, and 1471. In his account of the 1458 conclave that elected him pope, Pius II describes himself as stiffening his friend's spine to resist electing Guillaume d'Estouteville, Cardinal bishop of Ostia.

In 1459, Filippo succeeded Domenico Capranica as Grand penitentiary, and he is credited with improving the procedures of the Apostolic Penitentiary, regularizing the registration of petitions. Filippo was camerlengo of the College of Cardinals in 1454–1455. Calandrini is credited with Pope Paul II's 1471 decree transferring the ancient see of Luni, a decayed Etruscan city, to his home city of Sarzana. Cardinal Calandrini also had Pope Pius issue a brief on 7 April 1461 (vainly) prohibiting removal of Roman remains from Luni. Filippo died at Bagnoregio, at the age of 73 and was buried at San Lorenzo in Lucina, Rome.

Catholic Church titles
Preceded by Alain de Coëtivy	Camerlengo of the Sacred College of Cardinals; 1454–1455	Succeeded by Antonio Cerdà i Lloscos
