= Juan de Torquemada (cardinal) =

Spanish ecclesiastic (1388–1468)

His Eminence Juan de Torquemada OP
- Cardinal-Bishop of Sabina
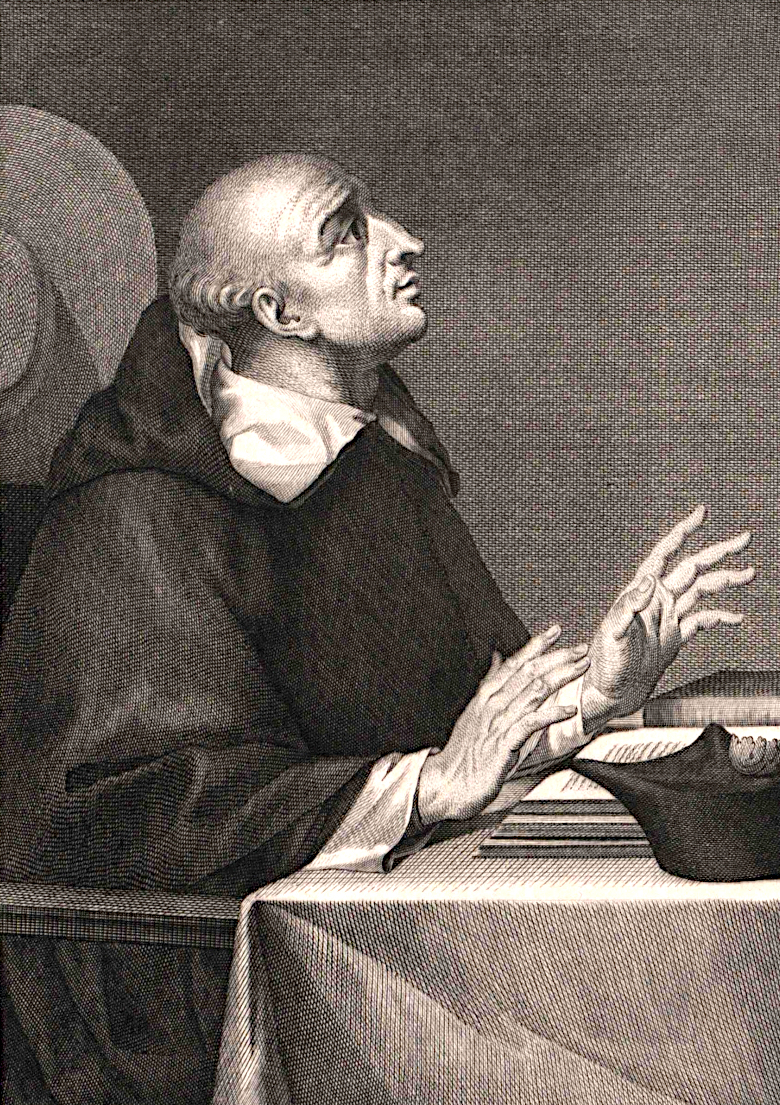
- Church: Catholic Church
- Diocese: Diocese of Sabina
- See: Sabina
- Appointed: 5 May 1463
- Term ended: 26 September 1468
- Predecessor: Isidore of Kiev
- Successor: Basilios Bessarion
- Previous posts: Cardinal-Priest of San Sisto (1440–1446); Bishop of Cádiz (1440–1442); Bishop of Ourense (1442–1445, 1463–1466); Cardinal-Priest of Santa Maria in Trastevere (1446–1460); Cardinal-Bishop of Palestrina (1460–1463); Bishop of León (1460–1463)

Orders
- Created cardinal: 18 December 1439 by Pope Eugene IV

Personal details
- Born: 1388 Valladolid, Kingdom of Castile
- Died: 26 September 1468 (aged 79–80) Rome, Papal States
- Buried: Santa Maria sopra Minerva

Juan de Torquemada O.P. (Ecclesiastical Latin: Johannes de Turre cremata, various spellings) (1388 – 26 September 1468), was a Spanish Thomistic Theologian, polemicist, and Cardinal. He has been described as the most articulate papal apologist of the fifteenth century, and a defender of Jewish converts to the Catholic Church (conversos).

Torquemada became a member of the Order of Friars Preachers at the age of fifteen. After his studies, he was a participant in five Papal elections during his life, and was present for the Council of Florence. Torquemada was elevated to Cardinal in 1439, by Pope Eugene IV. As prolific writer, he wrote championing the Papacy in his work Summa de ecclesia, defending the conversos in Castile, and attacking Islam. He was an uncle of Tomás de Torquemada, afterwards well-known as the Grand Inquisitor.

== Life ==
Juan de Torquemada was born in Valladolid, Spain. "There is a general historical consensus that the family were former Jews". Though those converso origins are very often stated without providing any source, they are "based primarily on Hernando del Pulgar’s statement that Juan de Torquemada’s abuelos were converts from the Jewish faith". As a converso, Pulgar is considered to have made this assertion out of hate for Juan de Torquemada’s nephew, Tomás de Torquemada. However, a 2020 study of all of Juan de Torquemada’s ancestors found no Jewish converts in his family. At an early age he joined the Dominican Order, and soon distinguished himself for learning and devotion. In 1415 he accompanied the general of his order to the Council of Constance. Thereafter he proceeded to the University of Paris to study and took his doctorate degree in theology in 1423. After teaching for some time in Paris, he became prior of the Dominican house in Valladolid, and then in Toledo.

Torquemada attended the Council of Basel (1431–1449) as a representative of his order and of the King of Castile. At the Council of Basel, he was one of the ablest supporters of the viewpoint of pope Eugene IV and the Roman curia. He was rewarded with the office of Master of the Sacred Palace (4 March 1435), and later with a cardinal's hat in 1439. Torquemada participated in the Council of Florence, speaking on theological issues involving the eastern churches and defending papal primacy in a debate with Cardinal Giuliano Cesarini. He also worked on behalf of Pope Eugene on missions to Germany and France before settling in the Roman Curia. As Cardinal of San Sisto, Torquemada supported papal Crusade policy in opposition to the Ottoman Turks.

In 1449 Toledo an unpopular tax law caused an insurrection against a weak government, during which a mob burned the house of a "new Christian" tax collector. (These "new Christians", or conversos, were persons of Jewish descent professing Christianity; their sincerity was doubted by some.) A faction led by one Pedro Sarmiento imposed a law that deprived conversos of government and church posts and disqualified them from testifying in legal proceedings. The legal status of conversos thus came into question. The dispute spread outside Castile and came to the attention of Pope Nicholas V. On the urging of Torquemada the Pope issued a bull condemning discrimination against conversos; he excommunicated Sarmiento and some of his followers. In 1450 Torquemada published a tract—a "sharp and relentless" theological attack—in which he labelled Sarmiento and his followers as Midianites and Ishmaelites, the biblical enemies of the Israelite people, comparing them to the evil persecutor Haman. Torquemada's defence of conversos was successful in Rome, but not eventually in Castile. (Juan de Torquemada was an uncle of the Inquisitor, Tomás de Torquemada. It has been argued that the latter's persecution of crypto-Jews was motivated by a sense of insecurity about his own origins.)

Torquemada has been described as the most articulate papal apologist of the fifteenth century. The medieval papacy's supremacy was challenged both by Hussites (early Protestants) and by conciliarists (who held that an ecumenical council of the Church had more authority than a pope). The Council of Basel had attempted to depose Pope Eugenius IV. Torquemada attacked both these positions in his Summa de ecclesia (1453).

Torquemada promoted reform of religious houses of his order and of monasteries. In 1456, the new Pope Callixtus III, aka Alfonso de Borja, gave him, in commendam, the position of Abbot of the monastery of Santa Scolastica in Subiaco. This connection may explain his interest in the importation of printing into Rome. The cardinal wrote extensively on behalf of papal primacy. Most notably, his Summa de ecclesia defended the Church against the Hussites and the Roman pontiff against conciliarism.

Torquemada became cardinal priest of Santa Maria in Trastevere (1446–1460), then cardinal bishop of Palestrina (1460–1463), and last cardinal bishop of Sabina (1463–1468). He participated in four papal elections, casting the deciding vote in the election of Pope Nicholas V (1447–1455).

He died at Rome in 1468 and was buried at Santa Maria sopra Minerva.

A painting by Antoniazzo Romano showing the Annunciation has in its background Torquemada presenting girls who received dowry funds from a guild he founded to the Virgin Mary. (At an earlier age he was painted by Fra Angelico in a Crucifixion scene now at Harvard University's Fogg Museum.)

== Works ==
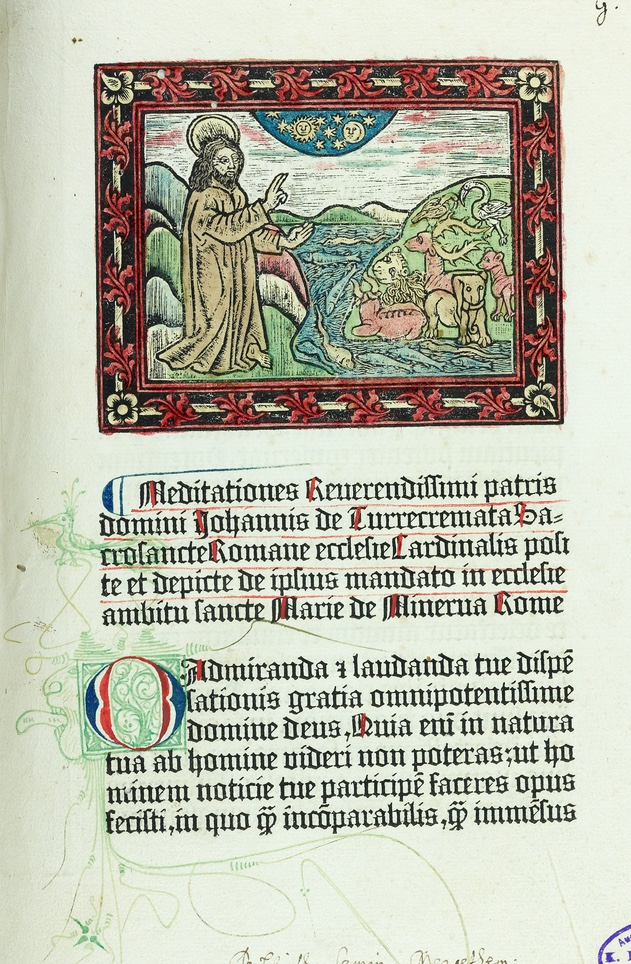
Torquemada's Meditationes printed at Mainz by Johannes Numeister in the late 15th century

Torquemada's principal works are:

- Meditationes, seu Contemplationes devotissimae (Rome, 1467)
- In Gratiani Decretum commentarii (4 vols., Venice, 1578)
- Expositio brevis et utilis super toto psalterio (Mainz, 1474)
- Quaestiones spirituales super evangelia totius anni (Brixen, 1498)
- Symbolum pro informatione Manichaeorum (El bogomilismo en Bosnia) (Publicaciones del Seminario Metropolitano de Burgos. Serie B)
- Tractatus contra Madianitas et Ismaelitas: defensa de los judíos conversos, (Publicaciones del Seminario Metropolitano de Burgos. Serie B, v. 2) (Burgos, 1957).
- Summa ecclesiastica (Salamanca, 1550) [or Summa de ecclesiastica potestate] or "Summa de ecclesia (Summa de Ecclesia una cum eiusdem apparatu nunc primum in lucem edito, super decreto Papae Eugenii IIII in concilio Florentino de Unione Graecorum - Venetiis [Venice]: apud Michaelem Tramezinum, 1561).

The Summa de ecclesia has the following topical books:

1. De universa ecclesia
2. De Ecclesia romana et pontificis primatu
3. De universalibus conciliis
4. De schismaticis et haereticis (divided into two parts, on schism & on heresy).

His De conceptione deiparae Mariae, libri viii. (Rome, 1547), was edited with preface and notes by E. B. Pusey (London, 1869 seq.) in opposition to Pope Pius IX's definition of the dogma of the Immaculate Conception.

Other works include polemical tracts and sermons.

Torquemada's Meditationes was the first illustrated book published in Italy. The first edition of the book was published in 1467 in Rome by Ulrich Han.

== Notes ==
Catholic Church titles
Preceded by Pietro Barbo	Camerlengo of the Sacred College of Cardinals; 1446	Succeeded by Giorgio Fieschi
