= Accessus =

Latin term

Accessus is a term applied to the voting in conclave for the election of a pope, by which a cardinal changes his vote and accedes to some other candidate. Accessus voting was first used in the papal conclave, 1455. The procedure was likely adopted from the Roman Senate where an acceding Senator would physically move to join the proponents of a proposal.

== Description ==
When the votes of the cardinals in the first ballot have been counted, and no candidate has achieved a two-thirds majority, at the following vote opportunity is granted for a cardinal to change his vote, by writing "Accedo domino Cardinali ...", mentioning one of those who have been voted for, but not the cardinal for whom he has already voted. If he should not wish to change his vote, the cardinal can vote "Nemini" ("for no one"). If these supplementary votes of accession, added to those a candidate has received, equal two-thirds of the total vote, then there is an election. If not, the ballots are burned, and the usual ballot takes place the next day.

Election by accessus was only possible because, until the mid-20th century, the ballots used by each cardinal were identified by a text of scripture in the back side. When a cardinal decided to use the right of accession, his two ballots had to "be compared and identified by the text on the reverse face of the ballot, so as to prevent a double vote for the same candidate by any elector".

Thus, voting by accession eliminated the secrecy of the first ballot.

Voting by accessus was prohibited by the cardinal dean at the 1903 conclave, and this form of election was later suppressed from the Catholic Church's legislation.
