= Alain de Coëtivy =

French prelate

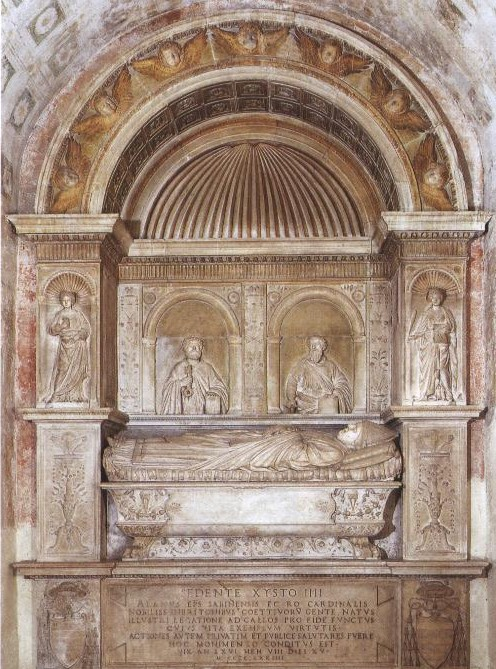
Tome of Cardinal Coëtivy, Santa Prassede, Rome

Alain (II) de Coëtivy (8 November 1407 – 4 May 1474) was a prelate from a Breton noble family. He was bishop of Avignon, Nîmes and of Dol, cardinal of the titular church of Santa Prassede, then cardinal-bishop of Palestrina and cardinal-bishop of Sabina. Sources often refer to him as the Cardinal of Avignon, his diocese when he became a cardinal.

Alain de Coëtivy was born at Plounéventer, Léon. His mother was Catherine du Chastel, and her brother was Tanneguy du Chastel, soldier and favorite of King Charles VII of France.

== Career ==
- canon of Le Léon, 5 July 1436 – 30 October 1437;
- bishop of Avignon, 30 October 1437 – 1474, carrying out building works on the Petit Palais at Avignon;
- administrator of the diocese of Uzès, 1442 to 1445;
- named a cardinal in pectore by Pope Eugene IV, confirmed by Pope Nicholas V in January 1447;
- named a cardinal in the consistory of 20 December 1448 by Pope Nicholas V;
- assigned the titular church of Santa Prassede, 3 January 1449;
- named bishop Nîmes in commendam on 1 April 1454, by transfer of a cousin, Jean du Châtel, to Carcassonne. The commission was revoked on 19 November 1460;
- In the conclave of 4–8 April 1455, Coëtivy was opposed to the election of Basilios Bessarion, for his Greek background and apparently incomplete conversion to Roman Catholicism.
- On 8 September 1455, Cardinal Coëtivy was given the crusader's cross by Pope Calixtus III personally, in a solemn ceremony in St. Peter's Basilica. He was sent as a pontifical legate to King Charles VII of France, departing Rome on 17 September 1455. He was charged by Pope Calixtus III with persuading Charles set out on the crusade against the Turks. He returned to Rome on 6 May 1458.
- On 3 June 1455, Pope Calixtus III canonized the Dominican preacher Vincent Ferrer. His remains, in the cathedral in Vannes, Brittany, were inspected on 29 June 1455, and found to be "uncorrupted". Pope Calixtus sent Cardinal Alain as his legate to France; he departed Rome on 17 September 1455. He was in Vannes, to preside over the inauguration of the cult of the new saint, on 2–4 June 1456, in the presence of the cardinal and fifteen bishops.
- made bishop-administrator of Dol, 18 June 1456. He did not reside in Dol, but instead appointed the Bishop of Alet, Anbroise de Camerato, as his coadjutor. He returned to Rome on 6 May 1458. He resigned on 7 January 1460, expecting to be replaced by Bishop Gabriel du Châtel of Uzès, but in 1462 the transfer was revoked and Coëtivy resumed the administration.
- present at the papal conclave of 1464, which elected Pope Paul II;
- as cardinal, made bishop of Palestrina on 7 June 1465, then of Sabina on 11 December 1472;
- made (honorary?) abbot of the abbey of Redon in 1468.

He also held the benefices of the parish of Marsac, which he resigned at the request of Pierre II de Bretagne on 4 September 1451. It was he who helped establish the parish of Saint-Yves-des-Bretons in Rome. Pope Nicholas V ceded Saint-André-de-Mortaraziis to the Breton nation, who reconsecrated it in honor of saint Yves.

He died in Rome, at his palace at the Campo de' Fiori, on 3 May 1474, at the age of 69. He was buried in Rome in his titular church. His monument at Santa Prassede was executed by Andrea Bregno.

== Bibliography ==
- Albanès, Joseph Hyacinthe (completed, annotated and published by Chevalier Ulysse), Gallia christiana novissima. Histoire des archevêchés, évêques et abbayes de France d'après les documents authentiques recueillis dans les registres du Vatican et les archives locales.
- Catel, Guillaume de. Histoire de Languedoc
- Charvet, Gratien (1870). La première maison d'Uzès, étude historique et généalogique de la première maison d'Uzès suivi du catalogue analytique des évêques d'Uzès (Alais: J. Martin 1870; Nîmes, edited by Lacour-Ollé, 2002 reissue) [pp. 120–122].
- De la Roque, Louis. Armorial de Languedoc
- Eubel, Conradus, ed. (1914). Hierarchia catholica (in Latin). Vol. 2 (second ed.). Münster: Libreria Regensbergiana.
- Germer-Durand, Eugène, Le Prieuré et le Pont de Saint-Nicolas-de-Campagnac
- Labande, Léon-Honoré (1920). Avignon au xve siècle: Légation de Charles de Bourbon et du cardinal Julien de la Rovère. (in French). Monaco, 1920. pp. 71-96
- La Roncière, Charles de (1895). La Pragmatique Sanction de 1438 et Alain de Coëtivy. (in French). Saint-Denis: H. Bouillant, 1895. [extract from: Correspondence historique et archeologique, Année 1895].
- Ménard, Léon, Histoire de Languedoc
- Vaissète, Joseph. Histoire générale du Languedoc

Catholic Church titles
Preceded by Guillaume-Hugues d'Estaing	Camerlengo of the Sacred College of Cardinals; 1453	Succeeded by Filippo Calandrini
