= Latino Orsini =

Italian Cardinal

- Archbishop of Taranto
- Church: Catholic Church
- Archdiocese: Archdiocese of Taranto
- In office: 30 October 1472 – 11 August 1477
- Predecessor: Mario Orsini
- Successor: Giovanni d'Aragona
- Other posts: Cardinal-Bishop of Frascati (1468-1477); Archpriest of the Archbasilica of Saint John Lateran (1463-1477)
- Previous posts: Administrator of Polignano (1468-1472); Administrator of Bari-Canosa (1454-1472); Cardinal-Bishop of Albano (1465-1468); Cardinal-Priest of Santi Giovanni e Paolo (1449-1465) (Arch)Bishop of Urbino (1450-1452); Archbishop of Trani (1439-1450); Archbishop of Conza (1438-1439)

Orders
- Created cardinal: 20 December 1448 by Pope Nicholas V

Personal details
- Born: 1411 Rome, Papal States
- Died: 11 August 1477 (aged 65–66) Rome, Papal States

Latino Orsini (1411 – 11 August 1477) was an Italian Cardinal.

== Life ==
Of the Roman branch of the Orsini family, he was the fourth child of Carlo and Paola Gironima Orsini. He entered the ranks of the Roman clergy as a youth, became subdeacon, and as early as 10 March 1438, was raised to the Episcopal See of Conza in Southern Italy. Transferred from this see to that of Trani (Southern Italy) in 1439, he remained archbishop of Trani after his elevation to the cardinalate by Pope Nicholas V on 20 December 1448.

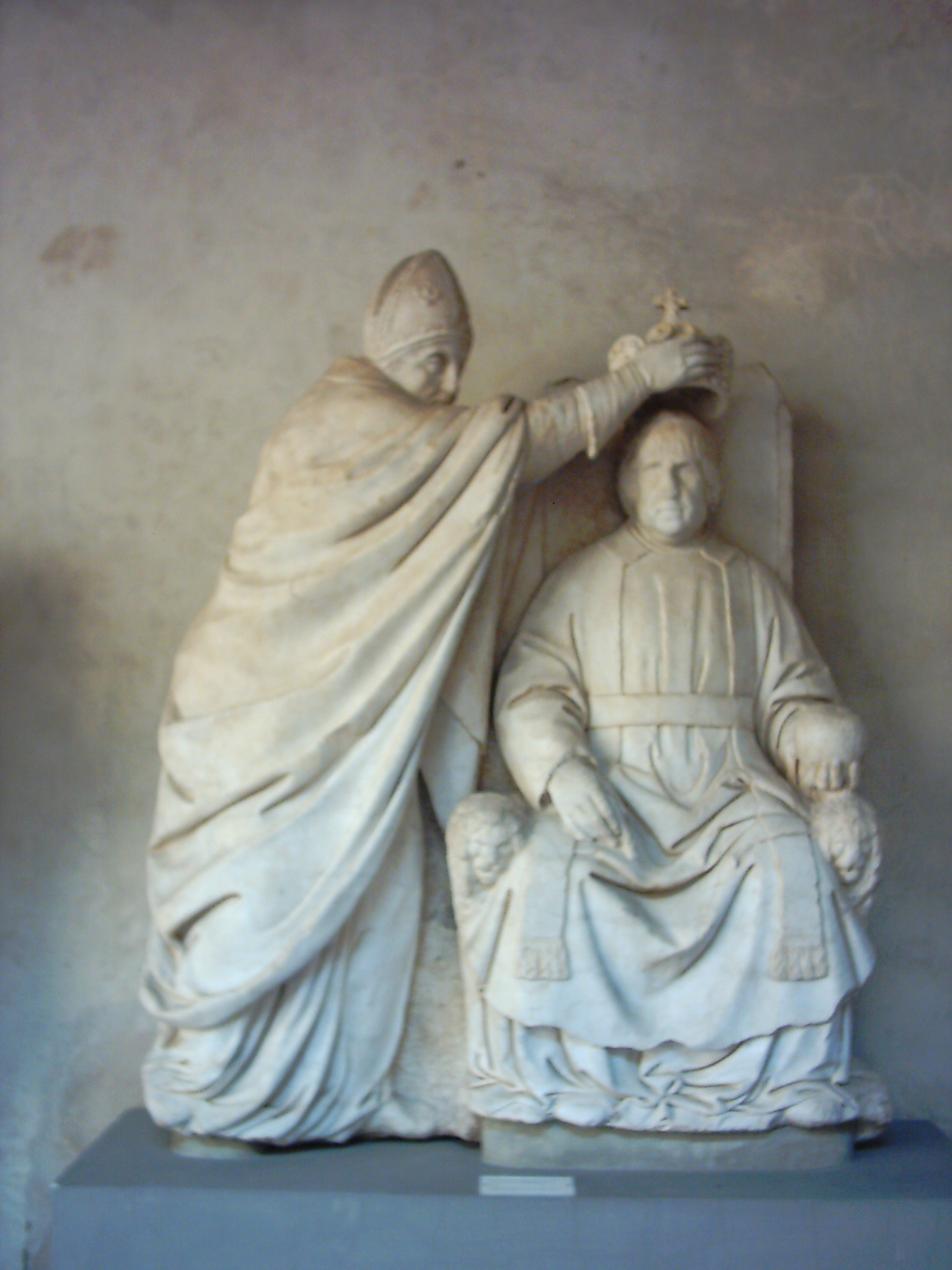
Coronation of Ferdinand I of Naples

In 1450, the Archbishopric of Urbino was conferred upon him, which made it possible for him to take up his residence in Rome, the See of Trani being given to his brother, Giovanni Orsini, Abbot of Farfa. He rebuilt San Salvatore in Lauro as a chapel for a monastery he established next door, and in which he installed the Canons Regular of San Giorgio in Alga. In February 1459, as papal legate acting for Pope Pius II, he crowned Ferdinand I of Naples at Barletta Cathedral.

Pope Sixtus IV, for whose election in 1471 Cardinal Latino had worked energetically, named him Camerlengo of the Holy Roman Church, granted him in 1472 the Archdiocese of Taranto, which he governed by proxy, and, in addition, placed him at the head of the government of the Papal States. He was also appointed commander-in-chief of the papal fleet in the war against the Turks.

In the last years of his life he became deeply religious, though he had been worldly in his youth, leaving a natural son named Paul, whom, with the consent of the pope, he made heir of his vast possessions.

Catholic Church titles
Preceded by Gaspard de Diano	Archbishop of Conza; 1438–1439	Succeeded by Raimondo degli Ugotti
Preceded by Giacomo Barrili	Archbishop of Trani; 1439–1450	Succeeded by Giovanni Orsini (bishop)
Preceded by Domingo Ram i Lanaja	Cardinal-Priest of Santi Giovanni e Paolo; 1449–1465	Succeeded by Philibert Hugonet
Preceded by Antonio Altan San Vito	Archbishop (Personal Title) of Urbino; 1450–1452	Succeeded by Andrea Veroli
Preceded by Isidore of Kiev	Camerlengo of the Sacred College of Cardinals; 1451 (1st time)	Succeeded by Guillaume-Hugues d'Estaing
Preceded by	Archpriest of the Arcibasilica di San Giovanni in Laterano; 1463–1477	Succeeded by Giuliano della Rovere
Preceded by Ludovico Trevisano	Cardinal-Bishop of Albano; 1465–1468	Succeeded by Filippo Calandrini
Preceded by Basilios Bessarion	Cardinal-Bishop of Frascati; 1468–1477	Succeeded by Giacomo Ammannati-Piccolomini
Preceded by Juan de Carvajal	Camerlengo of the Sacred College of Cardinals; 1469–1471 (2nd time)	Succeeded by Filippo Calandrini
Preceded by Marino Orsini	Archbishop of Taranto; 1472–1477	Succeeded by Giovanni d'Aragona
