= Jean Rolin (cardinal) =

French bishop and Cardinal (1408-1483)

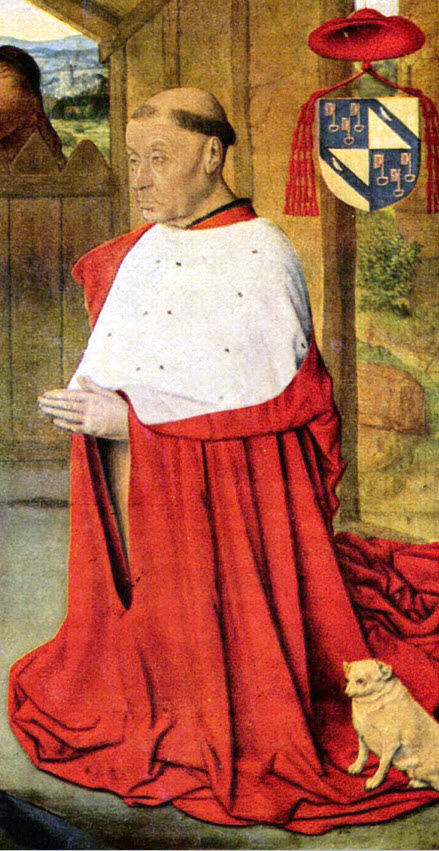
Detail of a Nativity painting by Jean Hey with donor portrait of Cardinal Rolin and his dog.

Jean (Jehan) Rolin (1408–1483) was a French bishop and Cardinal.

His father, Nicolas Rolin, was ducal Chancellor of Burgundy, and lord of Authumes. Jean became a Cardinal in 1448, created by Pope Nicholas V, as part of diplomatic engagement between the Duchy of Burgundy and the Papacy, tending against France.

He was bishop of Chalon-sur-Saône in 1431, and bishop of Autun in 1436. He was a patron of the arts, supporting the work of an anonymous illustrator known as the Master of Jean Rolin.
