= Domenico Capranica =

Italian Catholic cardinal

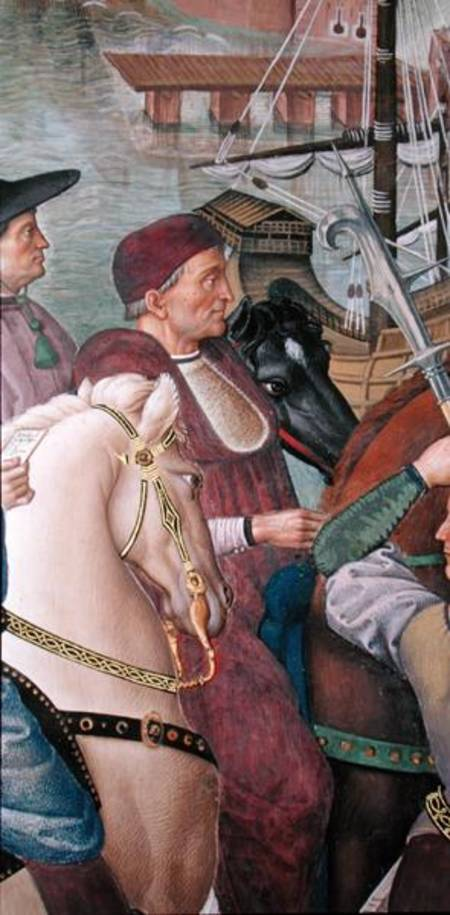
Domenico Capranica. Detail of a painting by Pinturicchio.

Coat of Arms of Cardinal Domenico Capranica

Domenico Capranica (1400 – 14 July 1458) was an Italian theologian, canonist, statesman, and cardinal.

== Life ==
Cardinal Capranica was born in Capranica Prenestina. His younger brother, Angelo, also became a cardinal. After studies in canon and civil law at Padua and Bologna, under teachers probably including Giuliano Cesarini, he received the title of Doctor of Both Laws at the age of twenty-one. Soon he became secretary to Pope Martin V, and Apostolic prothonotary, and in 1423 or 1426 was made cardinal by this pope, though his nomination was not published in a secret consistory until 1430.

Capranica had earned this rapid promotion by various political and military services, notable by his administration of Imola and Forlì and by his successful reduction of rebellious Bologna. In the meantime he had become Bishop of Fermo, but for some reason did not go to Rome for the public ceremonies at which he was to be made cardinal. Despite his protest, and their previous agreement with Martin V, the cardinals of the conclave that followed the latter's death (1431) refused to recognize Capranica's nomination, and the new pope, Pope Eugene IV, sustained their decision on the ground that the delivery of the hat and assignment of the title were necessary for the validity of a cardinal's nomination.

Capranica, having already suffered severe losses at Rome through the enmity of the Orsini, took refuge first with Filippo Maria Visconti of Milan and later appealed (1432) to the Council of Basel for recognition of his title. Among his entourage when he left for Basel was Enea Silvio Piccolomini, the future Pope Pius II. The Basel assembly recognized Capranica's promotion, but to punish him for adhering to the council Eugene IV deprived him of all honors and dignities, also of his possessions. Capranica sought a reconciliation with the pope at Florence (30 April 1434). Eugene restored to him his offices and goods, assigned to him the cardinal's church of Santa Croce in Gerusalemme, and sent him to the Council at Ferrara with a special commission to treat with the Greek bishops and theologians concerning the reunion of the Churches.

Cardinal Capranica executed twelve responsible embassies for the Apostolic See, and was named Grand Penitentiary (1449) and Archpriest of the Lateran.

Capranica inaugurated the restoration of primitive fervor among the Cistercians of Tuscany, and drew up for Pope Nicholas V, in 1449, a model plan of a general religious reform. He was stern and severe in character, and in the duties of his office open and free of speech, also quite fearless. He insisted on a personal examination of the votes cast for Nicholas V, whose election greatly surprised him, and remonstrated vigorously with Pope Callixtus III for his nepotism, especially in the nomination of Don Pedro Luis Borgia as Vicar (governor) of Spoleto.

Capranica was eminent as a peacemaker, notable at Genoa, where he healed grievous municipal dissensions, and again between the Apostolic See and King Alfonso V of Aragon and the princes of Germany. During the plague of 1456 he remained at Rome. He took a very prominent part in all the negotiations for a crusade against the Turks in the hope of restoring Constantinople to the Palæologi.

=== Death ===
The cardinal died about three weeks before Pope Callixtus. At his death the Milanese ambassador wrote home that "the wisest, the most perfect, the most learned, and the holiest prelate whom the Church has in our days possessed is gone from us". He added that the cardinal was universally considered as the favorite to become the next pope at the 1458 papal conclave. He lies buried in a chapel at Santa Maria sopra Minerva in Rome, near St. Catherine of Siena.

=== Legacy ===
Cardinal Capranica left all his property to ecclesiastical uses, saying: "The Church gave it to me; I give it back, for I am not its master, but its steward. I should indeed have reaped but little profit from the nights spent in studying ecclesiastical discipline if I were to leave to my relatives the goods of the Church which belong to the poor")

Pastor himself says that of all the cardinals of the Renaissance Age none but Niccolò Albergati, Cesarini, and Juan Carvajal can be compared with him.

Capranica is now best known as the founder of the Almo Collegio Capranica, which he opened in his own palace (the oldest Roman monument of the early Renaissance) for thirty-one poor scholars, sixteen in theology and the liberal arts, and fifteen in canon law. Its constitutions, drawn up by himself, are praised as a model of their kind. The college itself is the oldest of the Roman colleges and therefore rejoices in the peculiar title of "Almo Collegio". His manuscript library passed to the college. In 1460 his brother Cardinal Angelo Capranica erected nearby a special building for the college.

He supposedly wrote an opusculum known as "The Art of Dying Well" (1487). He is said by Mansi to have written a history of the council of Basel, never printed. The cardinal actually compiled a systematic collection of Basel's documents, which is found only in manuscript form.

== Bibliography ==
- Michael Catalani (1793). De vita et scriptis Dominici Capranicae Cardinalis, Antiditis Firmani commentarius (in Latin). Fermo: Aug. Paccaronius.
- Morpurgo-Castelnuovo, M. (1929). “Il Cardinal Domenico Capranica,” Archivio (Società romana di storia patria), 52, (1929), pp. 1–142.

=== Acknowledgment ===
Catholic Church titles
Preceded by Angelotto Fosco	Camerlengo of the Sacred College of Cardinals; 1438	Succeeded by Prospero Colonna
Preceded by Giorgio Fieschi	Camerlengo of the Sacred College of Cardinals; 1448	Succeeded by Astorgio Agnensi
