= Pope Paul II =

Head of the Catholic Church from 1464 to 1471

- Bishop of Rome
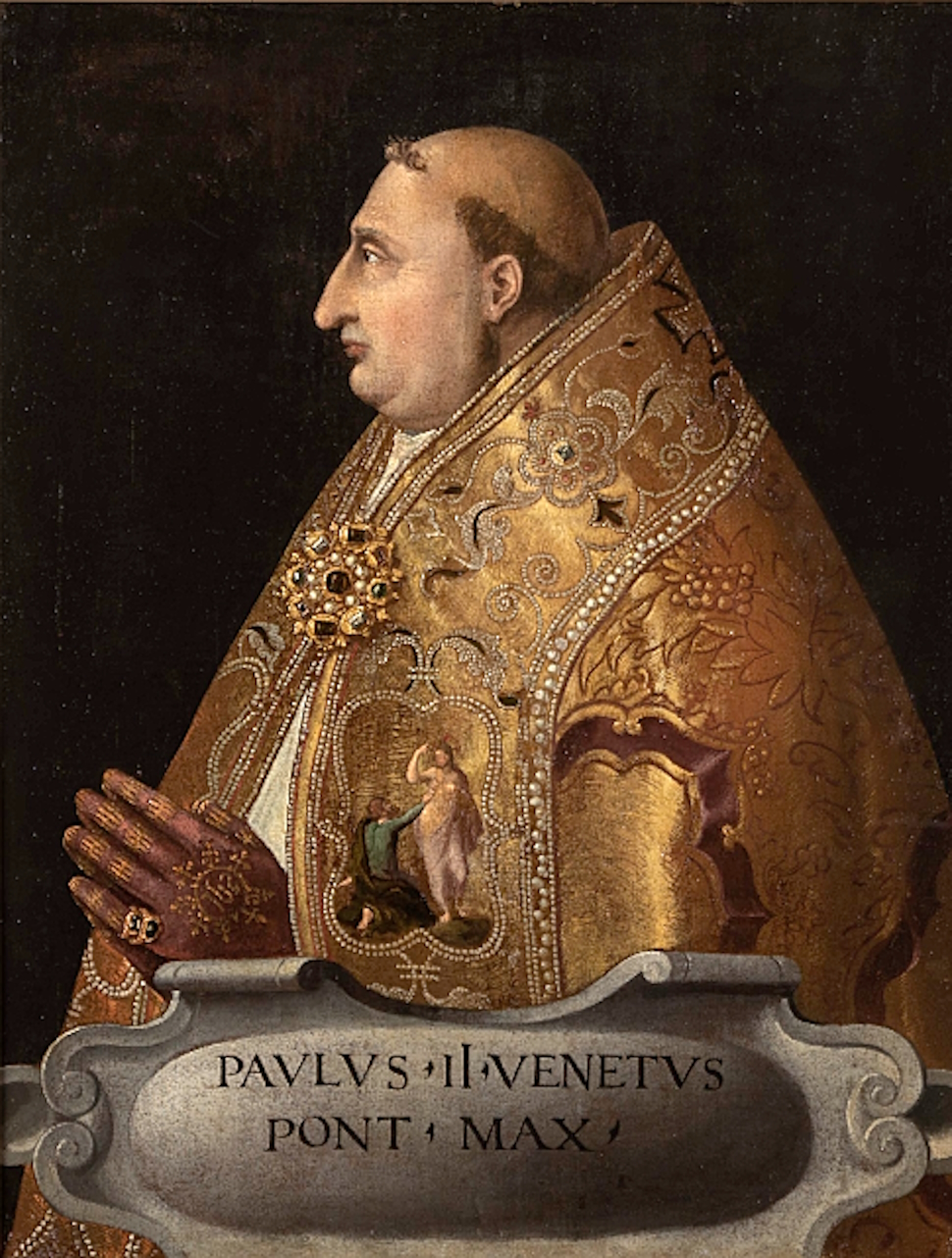
- Portrait of Pope Paul II, Pinacoteca Civica, Como
- Church: Catholic Church
- Papacy began: 30 August 1464
- Papacy ended: 26 July 1471
- Predecessor: Pius II
- Successor: Sixtus IV
- Previous posts: Cardinal-Deacon of Santa Maria Nuova (1440–1451); Apostolic Administrator of Cervia (1440–1451); Archpriest of the Papal Basilica of Saint Peter (1445–?); Camerlengo of the Sacred College of Cardinals (1445–1446; 1460–1461); Bishop of Vicenza (1451–1464); Cardinal-Priest of San Marco (1451–1464); Bishop of Padova (1459–1460); Abbot Ordinary of Montecassino (1465–1471)

Orders
- Created cardinal: 1 July 1440 by Eugene IV

Personal details
- Born: Pietro Barbo; 23 February 1417 Venice, Republic of Venice
- Died: 26 July 1471 (aged 54) Rome, Papal States
- Coat of arms

Papal styles of Pope Paul II
- Reference style: His Holiness
- Spoken style: Your Holiness
- Religious style: Holy Father
- Posthumous style: None

Pope Paul II (Latin: Paulus II; Italian: Paolo II; 23 February 1417 – 26 July 1471), born Pietro Barbo, was head of the Catholic Church and ruler of the Papal States from 30 August 1464 to his death in 1471. When his maternal uncle became Pope Eugene IV, Barbo switched from training to be a merchant to religious studies. His rise in the Church was relatively rapid. Elected pope in 1464, Paul amassed a great collection of art and antiquities.

== Early life ==
Pietro Barbo was born in Venice, the son of Niccolò Barbo and wife Polissena Condulmer. His mother was the sister of Pope Eugene IV (1431–1447). Through his father he was a member of the noble Barbo family. His adoption of the spiritual career, after having been trained as a merchant, was prompted by his uncle's election as pope. His consequent promotion was rapid. He became Archdeacon of Bologna, and Bishop of Cervia and of Vicenza, and in 1440 became a cardinal-deacon. While he was in Rome, Vicenza was administered by his brother, Paolo Barbo. Barbo gained popularity through his generosity. He might have boasted that if elected pope he would buy each cardinal a villa to escape the summer heat.

After having been lay abbot of Santa Maria in Sylvis since 1441, in 1445 he succeeded Giuliano Cesarini as archpriest of the Vatican Basilica. Barbo was very influential under Eugene IV, Nicholas V, and Calixtus III, but less so under Pius II. Barbo had a marked propensity to enjoy dressing up in sumptuous ecclesiastical finery.

== Election ==
Barbo was elected to succeed Pope Pius II by the accessus in the first ballot of the papal conclave of 30 August 1464 with a majority of fourteen of the nineteen cardinals present. He owed his election in part to the dissatisfaction of some of the cardinals with the policy of his predecessor.

Upon taking office, Paul II was to convene an ecumenical council within three years. But these terms of subscription were modified by Paul II at his own discretion, and this action lost him the confidence of the College of Cardinals. The justification for setting aside the capitulations, seen to be under way by the Duke of Milan's ambassador as early as 21 September, lay in connecting any abridgement of the Pope's absolute monarchy in the Papal States with a consequent abridgement of his sole authority in spiritual matters. Almost from his coronation, Paul withdrew and became inaccessible: audiences were only granted at night and even good friends waited a fortnight to see him. His suspiciousness was widely attested.

Paul wore rouge in public. The story of Cardinal Ammanati that he meant to take the name Formosus II (meaning "handsome"), after Pope Formosus, but was persuaded not to, is more often repeated than the story that he was dissuaded from Marcus, being Venetian and the Cardinal of San Marco, because it was also the war-cry of Venice. He had a papal tiara made for his own use studded with "diamonds, sapphires, emeralds, topaz, large pearls, and every kind of precious gem". He built the Palazzo San Marco (now the Palazzo Venezia) and lived there even as pope, amassing a great collection of art and antiquities.

== Conflict ==
A sore point was his abuse of the practice of creating cardinals in pectore, without publishing their names. Eager to raise new cardinals to increase the number who were devoted to his interests, but restricted by the terms of the capitulation, which gave the college a voice in the creation of new members, in the winter of 1464–65 Paul created two secret cardinals both of whom died before their names could be published. In his fourth year as Pope, he created eight new cardinals on 18 September 1467. Five were candidates pressed by kings, placating respectively James II of Cyprus, Edward IV of England, Louis XI of France, Matthias Corvinus of Hungary and Ferdinand I of Naples; one was the able administrator of the Franciscans; and the last two elevated his old tutor and a first cardinal-nephew. Two further cardinal-nephews were added on 21 November 1468. In a sign of his increasing secretiveness and paranoia, he added two more cardinals secretly at the same consistory, and four more at the beginning of 1471, expecting to reveal them only in his testament.

Tensions came to the fore when in attempting to eliminate redundant offices, Paul II proceeded to annul the college of Abbreviators, whose function it was to formulate papal documents; a storm of indignation arose, inasmuch as rhetoricians and poets with humanist training, had long been accustomed to benefiting from employment in such positions. Paul proceeded as well against the Roman Academy. Bartolomeo Platina was a member of both and found his papal employment abruptly curtailed. He wrote a pamphlet insolently demanding the pope recall his restrictions, and was imprisoned in the winter of 1464, but released four months later.

In February 1468, when Rome was rife with political intrigue fomented by the Roman barons and the neighboring princes, Paul II arrested Platina and other members of the academy on charges of irreligion, immorality, and an alleged conspiracy to assassinate the Pope. The prisoners were interrogated under torture and eventually released.

After his release on 7 July 1469, Platina expected to be again in the employ of Paul II, who, however, declined his services. Platina threatened vengeance and executed his threat, when at the suggestion of Pope Sixtus IV he later wrote his Vitæ Pontificum Platinæ historici liber de vita Christi ac omnium pontificum qui hactenus ducenti fuere et XX (1479). Not unaccountably, Platina set forth an unfavorable delineation of the character of Paul II.

Among other things, Platina reported that Pius II suggested Barbo should have been called Maria Pietissima, as "when he could not obtain what he aimed at by praying, entreating, and requesting, he would join tears to his petitions to make them the sooner believed." Some historians have suggested the nickname may also have been a possible allusion to a perceived lack of masculinity, reflecting possible homosexuality. Platina also paints his enemy as cruel, and an archenemy of science. For centuries it influenced historical opinions until critical research proved otherwise.

Though Platina's writing after the conflict would tarnish the legacy of Paul II, the conflict would prove to have a greater effect on the intellectual environment of Rome. Peter Partner explains, "Probably its most important result was to convince men of letters that cultural conformity would be enforced in Rome." More tangibly, after the crackdown of Paul II, the Roman Academy took on a more religious flavour, turning in part to theology as a means of legitimizing its pursuits.

== Final years ==
Pope Paul rejected George of Poděbrady (King George of Bohemia) because he upheld the conventions of the Council of Basel in favour of the Utraquists. In August 1465, Paul II summoned George before the Roman tribunal. When the King failed to come, Paul allied himself with the insurgents in Bohemia and released the King's subjects from their oath of allegiance. In December 1466, he pronounced the ban of excommunication and sentence of deposition against George. George's apologist, Gregory of Heimberg, subsequently accused Paul of immorality, a move that resulted in Gregory's own excommunication.

Just when the King's goodwill disposed the Pope in favor of reconciliation, Paul died suddenly of a heart attack on 26 July 1471. Reports of the death varied. Some claimed he had collapsed from severe indigestion after eating melon in excess. Some (mainly the pontiff's critics) said that he had died whilst being sodomized by a page boy. Nevertheless, his death resulted in the creation of a power vacuum in Central Europe – especially after Poděbrady himself died in March of that same year.

== Legacy ==
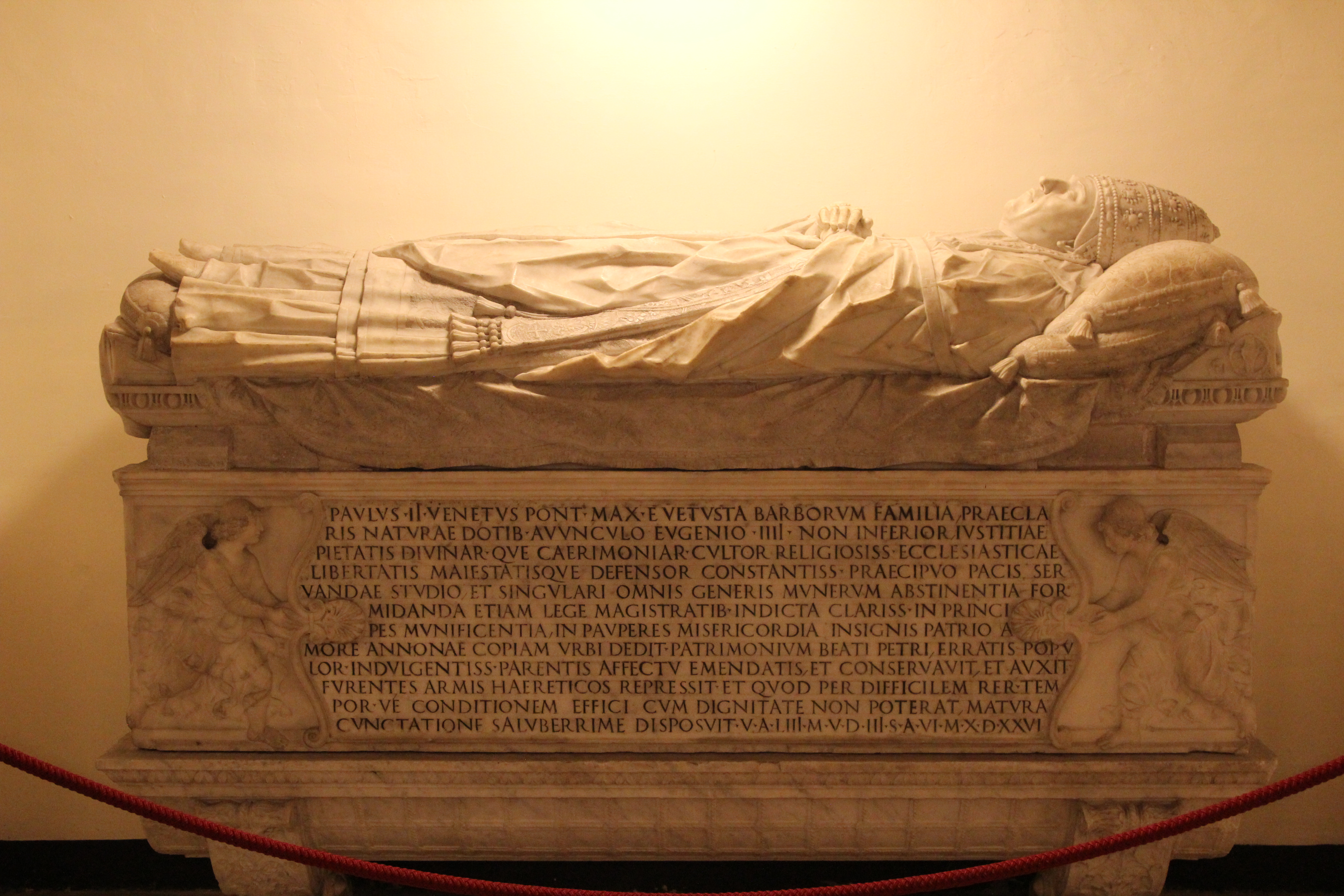
Grave of Paul II in the Vatican Grottoes

Although Paul II was a committed opponent of humanist learning, he oversaw and approved the introduction of printing into the Papal States, first at Subiaco in 1464 by Arnold Pannartz and Konrad Sweynheim, and at Rome itself in 1467. The result was that books and other documents became far more numerous and less expensive to procure than the previous handwritten manuscripts. Printing put the materials needed for an advanced education into the hands of more people than ever before, including an increasing number of laypeople. The output of printing presses at this period was, as a matter of course, subject to governmental scrutiny; during Paul II's reign, books produced in the Papal States were largely limited to Latin classical literature and ecclesiastical texts.

The chronicler Stefano Infessura's republican and anti-papal temper makes his diary a far from neutral though well-informed witness. But it is certain that although Paul II opposed the humanists, he yet provided for popular amusements: in 1466 he permitted the horse-race that was a feature of Carnival to be run along the main street, the Via Lata, which became known from this annual event as the Via del Corso. So that nobody felt left out of the event, the Pope instituted races for boys, adult men, old people and Jews, with appropriate prizes for each group. He tried to reduce or stop blood feuds and vendettas in Italy, and to make sure that Jews were treated fairly. Paul II displayed an extravagant love of personal splendor that gratified his sense of self-importance. After his death Sixtus IV and a selected group of cardinals inspected the treasure laid up against expenditures against the Turks: they found 54 silver shells filled with pearls, to a value of 300,000 ducats, jewels and gold intended for refashioning, worth another 300,000 ducats, and a magnificent diamond worth 7,000 ducats, which was sent to Cardinal d'Estouteville to cover monies he had advanced to the pontiff. The coin was not immediately found. He had also amassed a collection of 800 gemstones.

William Francis Barry considers that his character was "misunderstood by the Italian courts which never dreamt that a Pope could be an honourable man".

In statecraft, Paul II lacked eminence and achieved nothing of consequence for Italy. In his own domain, however, he terminated the regime of the counts of Anguillara in 1465.

== See also ==
- Cardinals created by Paul II

== Notes ==
Catholic Church titles
Preceded by Albert d'Albret	Camerlengo of the Sacred College of Cardinals; 1445–1446	Succeeded by Juan de Torquemada
Preceded by Juan de Mella	Camerlengo of the Sacred College of Cardinals; 1460	Succeeded by Alessandro Oliva
Preceded by Pius II	Pope; 30 August 1464 – 26 July 1471	Succeeded by Sixtus IV
