= Cardinals created by Sixtus IV =

Catholic appointments from 1471 to 1484

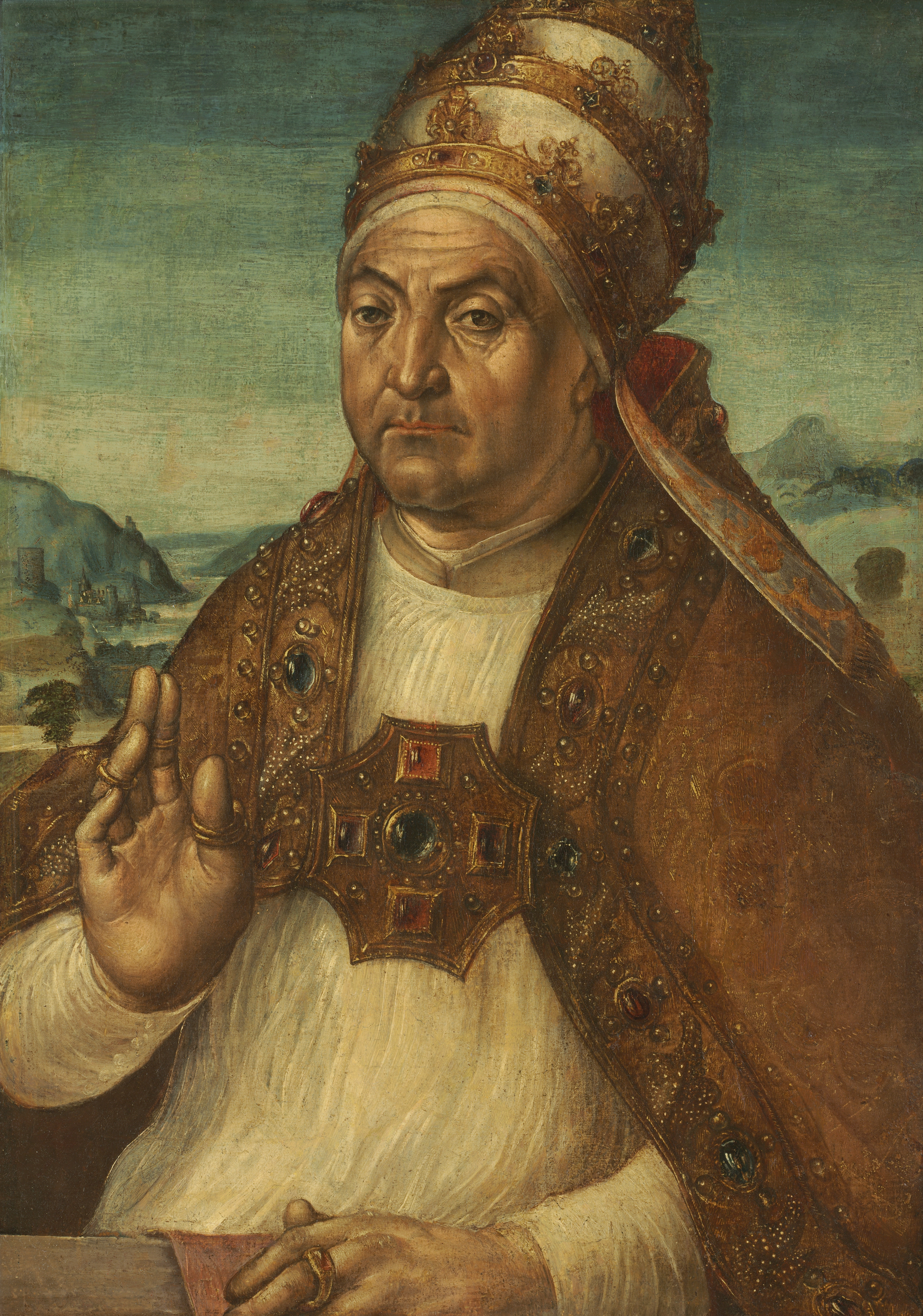
Pope Sixtus IV (r. 1471–1484)

Pope Sixtus IV (r. 1471–1484) created 34 new cardinals in eight consistories:

== Consistory of 16 December 1471 ==
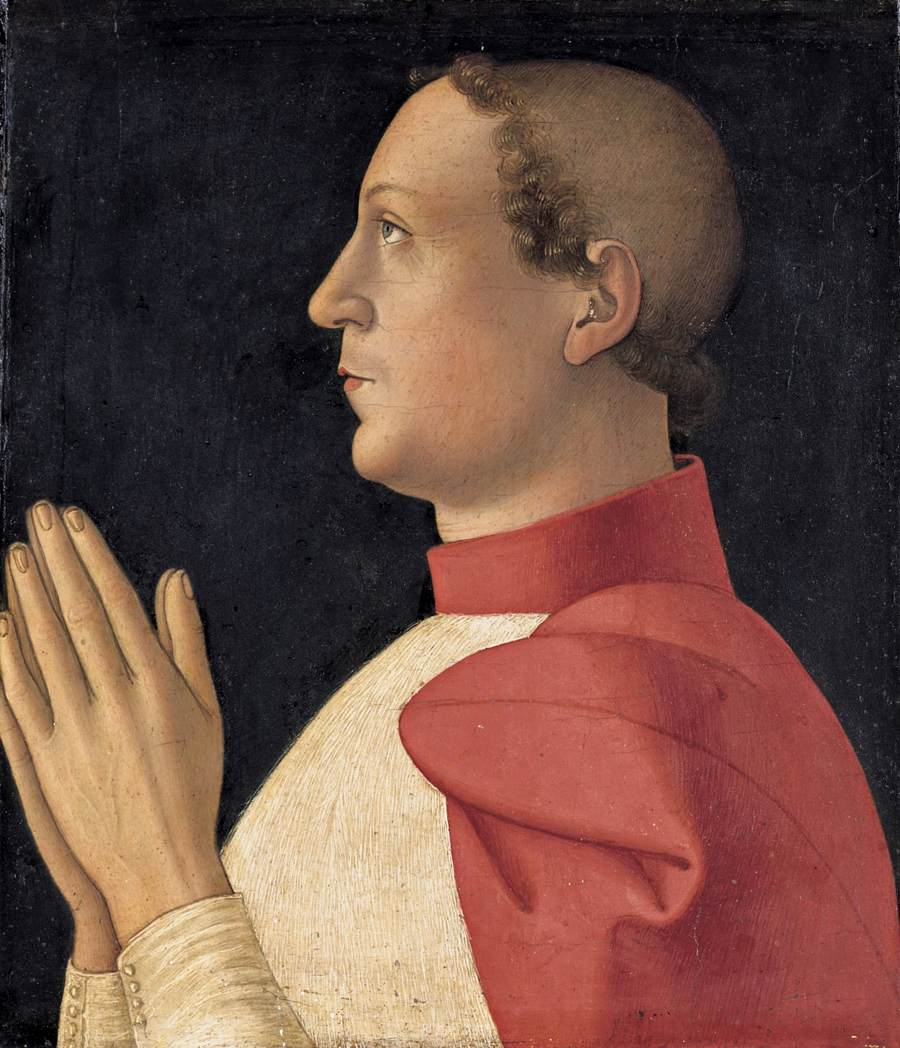
Philippe de Levis (1435-75), made a cardinal on 7 May 1473.

The new cardinals received their titular churches on 22 December 1471.

- Pietro Riario, O.F.M.Conv., nephew of the Pope, bishop of Treviso – cardinal-priest of S. Sisto, † 5 January 1474
- Giuliano della Rovere, nephew of the Pope, bishop of Carpentras – cardinal-priest of S. Pietro in Vincoli, then cardinal-bishop of Sabina (19 April 1479), cardinal-bishop of Ostia e Velletri (31 January 1483), became Pope Julius II on 1 November 1503, † 21 February 1513

== Consistory of 7 May 1473 ==
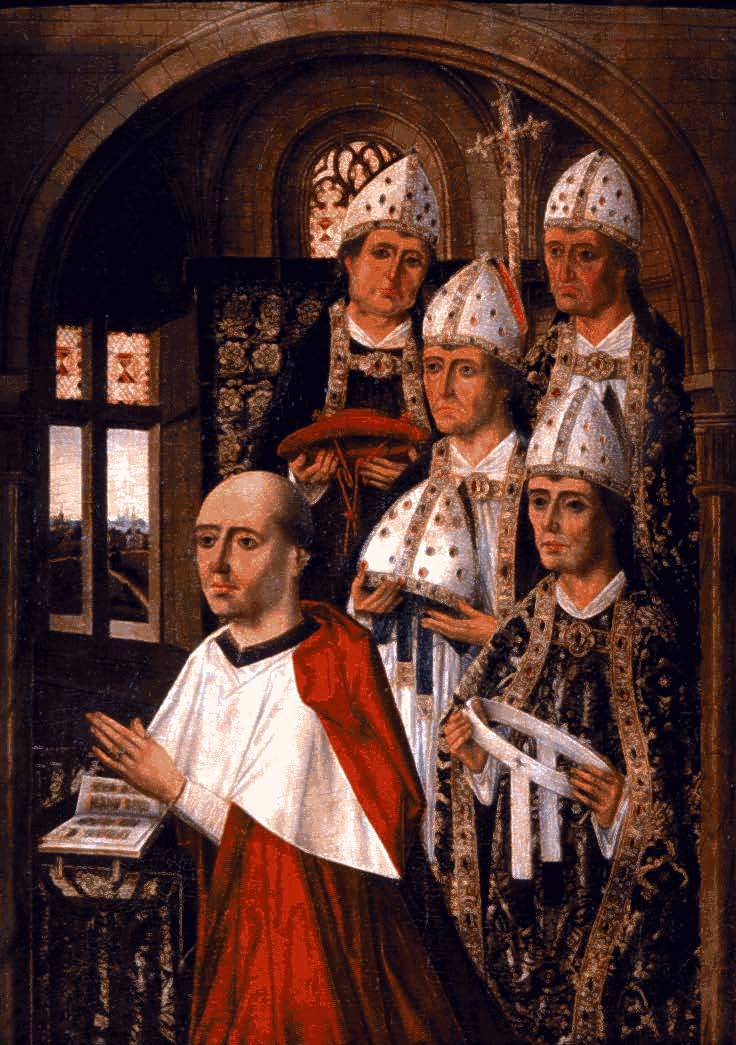
Pedro González de Mendoza (1428-95), made a cardinal on 7 May 1473.

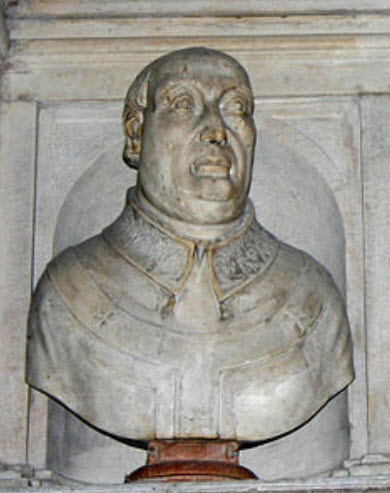
Giovanni Arcimboldi (d. 1488), made a cardinal on 7 May 1473.

The new cardinals received their titular churches on 17 May 1473.

- Philippe de Levis, archbishop of Arles – cardinal-priest of SS. Marcellino e Pietro, † 4 November 1475
- Stefano Nardini, Archbishop of Milan – cardinal-priest of S. Adriano, then cardinal-priest of S. Maria in Trastevere (1476), † 22 October 1484
- Ausiàs Despuig, archbishop of Monreale, governor of Rome, vice-camerlengo of the Holy Roman Church, ambassador of the Kingdom of Aragon – cardinal-priest of S. Vitale, then cardinal-priest of S. Sabina (12 December 1477), † 3 September 1483
- Pedro González de Mendoza, bishop of Sigüenza, chancellor of the Kingdom of Castile – cardinal-priest of S. Maria in Domnica, then cardinal-priest of S. Croce in Gerusalemme (6 July 1478), † 11 January 1495
- Giacopo Antonio Venier, bishop of Cuenca – cardinal-priest of SS. Vito e Modesto, then cardinal-priest of S. Clemente (3 December 1476), † 3 August 1479
- Giovanni Battista Cibo, bishop of Molfetta and datary of His Holiness – cardinal-priest of S. Balbina, then cardinal-priest of S. Cecilia (January 1474), became Pope Innocent VIII on 29 August 1484, † 25 July 1492
- Giovanni Arcimboldi, bishop of Novara, ambassador of the Duchy of Milan – cardinal-priest of SS. Nereo ed Achilleo, then cardinal-priest of S. Prasede (30 December 1476), † 2 October 1488
- Philibert Hugonet, bishop of Mâcon – cardinal-priest of S. Lucia in Silice, then cardinal-priest of SS. Giovanni e Paolo (17 August 1477), † 11 September 1484

== Consistory of 18 December 1476 ==
Charles II, Duke of Bourbon (1434-88), made a cardinal on 18 December 1476.

- Jorge da Costa, archbishop of Lisbon, first minister of the Kingdom of Portugal – cardinal-priest of SS.Marcellino e Pietro (received the title on 15 January 1477), then cardinal-priest of S. Maria in Trastevere (1485), cardinal-bishop of Albano (10 October 1491), cardinal-bishop of Tusculum (14 May 1501), cardinal-bishop of Porto e Santa Rufina (10 April 1503), † 18 September 1508
- Charles de Bourbon, archbishop of Lyon – cardinal-priest of SS. Silvestro e Martino (received the title on 15 January 1477), † 17 September 1488
- Pedro Ferris, bishop of Tarazona – cardinal-priest of S. Sisto (received the title on 30 December 1476), † 25 September 1478
- Giovanni Battista Mellini, bishop of Urbino – cardinal-priest of SS. Nereo ed Achilleo (received the title on 30 December 1476), † 24 July 1478
- Pierre de Foix, bishop of Vannes and Aire – cardinal-deacon of SS. Cosma e Damiano (received the title on 15 January 1477), † 10 August 1490

== Consistory of 10 December 1477 ==
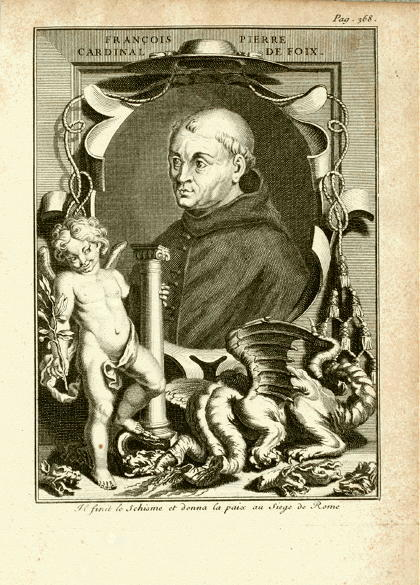
Pierre de Foix (1449-90), made a cardinal on 18 December 1476.

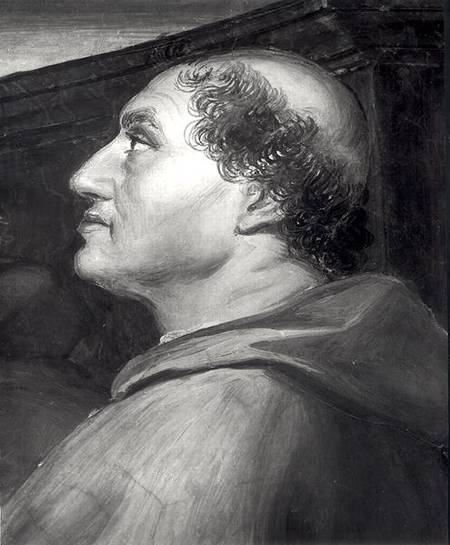
Raffaele Riario (1461–1521), made a cardinal on 10 December 1477.

The new cardinals received their titular churches on 12 December 1477.

- Cristoforo della Rovere, relative of the Pope, archbishop of Tarentaise and governor of the Castle S. Angelo – cardinal-priest of S. Vitale, † 1 February 1478
- Girolamo Basso della Rovere, nephew of the Pope, bishop of Recanati – cardinal-priest of S. Balbina, then cardinal-priest of S. Crisogono (17 September 1479), cardinal-bishop of Palestrina (31 August 1492), cardinal-bishop of Sabina (29 November 1503), † 1 September 1507
- Georg Hesler, protonotary apostolic, chancellor of the Frederick III, Holy Roman Emperor – cardinal-priest of S. Lucia in Silice, † 21 September 1482
- Gabriele Rangone, O.F.M. Obs., bishop of Eger – cardinal-priest of SS. Sergio e Bacco, † 27 September 1486
- Pietro Foscari, protonotary apostolic – cardinal-priest of S. Nicola inter Immagines, † 11 August 1485
- Giovanni d'Aragona, son of the king Ferrante I of Naples, administrator of the see of Taranto, bishop of Cava – cardinal-deacon of S. Adriano, then cardinal-priest of S. Adriano (14 January 1480), cardinal-priest of S. Sabina (10 September 1483), † 17 October 1485
- Raffaele Riario, grand-nephew of the Pope, protonotary apostolic – cardinal-deacon of S. Giorgio in Velabro, then cardinal-bishop of Albano (29 November 1503), cardinal-bishop of Sabina (3 August 1507), cardinal-bishop of Porto e Santa Rufina (22 September 1508) i cardinal-bishop of Ostia e Velletri (20 January 1511), † 9 July 1521

== Consistory of 10 February 1478 ==
- Domenico della Rovere, relative of the Pope, governor of the Castle S. Angelo– cardinal-priest of S. Vitale, then cardinal-priest of S. Clemente (13 August 1479), † 22 April 1501

== Consistory of 15 May 1480 ==
- Paolo di Campofregoso, archbishop of Genoa – cardinal-priest of S. Anastasia, then cardinal-priest of S. Sisto (9 March 1489), † 22 March 1498
- Cosma Orsini, O.S.B., archbishop of Trani – cardinal-priest of S. Sisto, then cardinal-priest of SS. Nereo ed Achilleo (3 June 1480), † 21 November 1481
- Ferry de Clugny, bishop of Tournai – cardinal-priest of S. Vitale, then cardinal-priest of S. Maria in Domnica (1482), † 7 October 1483
- Giovanni Battista Savelli, protonotary apostolic – cardinal-deacon of SS. Vito e Modesto, then cardinal-deacon of S. Nicola in Carcere (1483), † 18 September 1498
- Giovanni Colonna, protonotary apostolic – cardinal-deacon of S. Maria in Aquiro, † 26 September 1508

== Consistory of 15 November 1483 ==
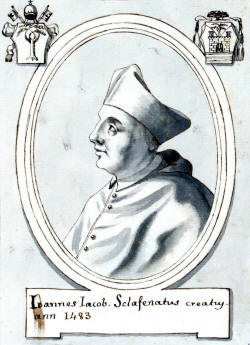
Giovanni Giacomo Sclafenati (d. 1497), made a cardinal on 15 November 1483.

Ascanio Sforza (1455–1505), made a cardinal on 17 March 1484.

- Giovanni Conti, archbishop of Conza – cardinal-priest of SS. Nereo ed Achilleo, then cardinal-priest of S. Vitale (1484), † 20 October 1493
- Hélie de Bourdeilles, O.F.M.Obs., archbishop of Tours, confessor of the king Louis XI of France – cardinal-priest of S. Lucia in Silice, † 5 July 1484
- Juan Margarit i Pau, bishop of Girona, chancellor of the Kingdom of Aragon – cardinal-priest of S. Vitale, then cardinal-priest of S. Balbina (1484), † 21 November 1484
- Giovanni Giacomo Sclafenati, bishop of Parma, secretary of the Sacred College of Cardinals, prefect of the Castle S. Angelo – cardinal-priest of S. Stefano al Monte Celio, † 9 December 1497
- Giambattista Orsini, protonotary apostolic – cardinal-deacon of S. Maria in Domnica, then cardinal-deacon of S. Maria Nuova (23 March 1489), cardinal-priest of SS. Giovanni e Paolo (27 February 1493), † 22 February 1503

== Consistory of 17 March 1484 ==
- Ascanio Sforza, administrator of the see of Pavia – cardinal-deacon of SS. Vito e Modesto, † 27 May 1505
