= 1484 conclave =

Election of Catholic Pope Innocent VIII

Papal conclave August 1484

Dates and location
- 26–29 August 1484; Apostolic Palace, Papal States

Key officials
- Dean: Roderic de Borja
- Camerlengo: Raffaele Riario
- Protodeacon: Francesco Piccolomini

Elected pope
- Giovanni Battista Cybo; Name taken: Innocent VIII
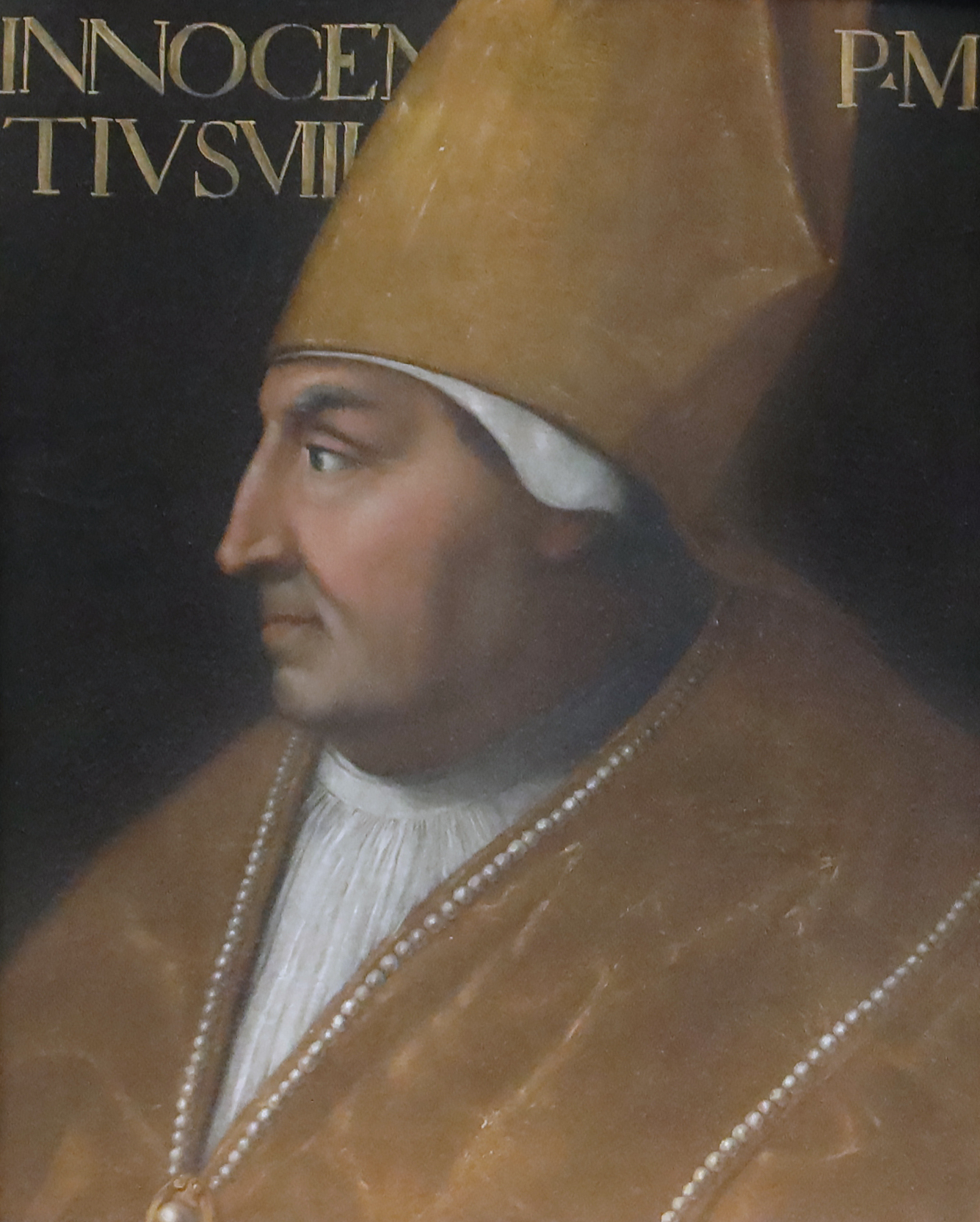

The 1484 papal conclave (26–29 August) elected Pope Innocent VIII after the death of Pope Sixtus IV.

== The election ==
At the death of Sixtus IV, the conclave of cardinals that met to elect his successor numbered thirty-two cardinals.

The immediate context of the election as the nearly unprecedented packing of the College of Cardinals by Sixtus IV, not only in terms of overall size, but also in terms of cardinal-nephews and crown cardinals. As a result, nearly all of the non-Venetian cardinals supported the continuation of Sixtus IV's policies of isolation towards the Republic of Venice, specifically the Peace of Bagnolo. However, the two factions of cardinals differed over whether the church ought to prioritize the continuation of the Italian League or should prioritize papal power (especially vis-a-vis Naples) over the preservation of the peace. Cardinal Borja led the first faction and Cardinal della Rovere, the second; these factions were roughly aligned with the Orsini and Colonna families, respectively.

The conclave was carried out by the largest non-schismatic College since the eleventh century. Because of an intense dispute between the Colonna and Orsini, the city of Rome was marked by far more civil unrest during the sede vacante than was to be expected historically. While Count Girolamo Riario was away besieging a Colonna stronghold, his palace was sacked and his wife fled to the Castel Sant'Angelo. Upon his return to the city Count Riario joined his wife and held the Castel until persuaded to withdraw from the city with payment of 4000 ducats.

In order to prevent the selection of Cardinal Barbo, on the evening before the election, after the cardinals retired for the night, the Dean of the College of Cardinals, Cardinal Giuliano della Rovere, nephew of the late Pope, and Cardinal Borgia, the Vice-Chancellor, visited a number of cardinals and secured their votes with the promise of various benefices.

== Cardinal electors ==
| Elector | Nationality | Order | Title | Elevated | Elevator | Notes |
|---|---|---|---|---|---|---|
| Rodrigo Borja | Spanish | Cardinal-bishop | Bishop of Porto e Santa Rufina, administrator of Valencia | 20 February 1456 | Callixtus III | Dean of the College of Cardinals; Vice-Chancellor of the Holy Roman Church; future Pope Alexander VI; cardinal-nephew |
| Giuliano della Rovere | Ligurian | Cardinal-bishop | Bishop of Ostia e Velletri, bishop of Bologna, administrator of Avignon | 15 December 1471 | Sixtus IV | Grand Penitentiary, Future Pope Julius II; cardinal-nephew |
| Oliviero Carafa | Neapolitan | Cardinal-bishop | Bishop of Albano | 18 September 1467 | Paul II | |
| Marco Barbo | Venetian | Cardinal-bishop | Bishop of Palestrina, patriarch of Aquileia | 18 September 1467 | Paul II | Cardinal-nephew |
| Giovanni Battista Zeno | Venetian | Cardinal-bishop | Bishop of Frascati | 21 November 1468 | Paul II | Cardinal-nephew |
| Giovanni Michiel | Venetian | Cardinal-priest | Title of S. Marcello | 21 November 1468 | Paul II | Cardinal-nephew |
| Stefano Nardini | Forlì | Cardinal-priest | Title of S. Maria in Trastevere, archbishop of Milan | 7 May 1473 | Sixtus IV | |
| Giovanni Battista Cibo | Ligurian | Cardinal-priest | Title of S. Cecilia, bishop of Molfetta | 7 May 1473 | Sixtus IV | Camerlengo of the Sacred College of Cardinals; Elected Pope Innocent VIII |
| Giovanni Arcimboldo | Milanese | Cardinal-priest | Title of S. Prassede, bishop of Novara | 7 May 1473 | Sixtus IV | |
| Philibert Hugonet | French | Cardinal-priest | Title of Ss. Giovanni e Paulo, bishop of Macon | 7 May 1473 | Sixtus IV | |
| Jorge da Costa, O.Cist. | Portuguese | Cardinal-priest | Title of Ss. Marcellino e Pietro, archbishop of Lisbon | 18 December 1476 | Sixtus IV | |
| Girolamo Basso della Rovere | Ligurian | Cardinal-priest | Title of S. Crisogono, bishop of Recanati | 10 December 1477 | Sixtus IV | Cardinal-nephew |
| Pietro Foscari | Venetian | Cardinal-priest | Title of S. Nicola fra le Immagini | 25 March 1471 (in pectore), 10 December 1477 | Paul II (in pectore), Sixtus IV | |
| Giovanni d'Aragona | Neapolitan | Cardinal-priest | Title of S. Sabina | 10 December 1477 | Sixtus IV | |
| Raffaele Riario | Ligurian | Cardinal-priest | Title of S. Lorenzo in Damaso | 10 December 1477 | Sixtus IV | Camerlengo of the Holy Roman Church; Cardinal-nephew |
| Domenico della Rovere | Turinese | Cardinal-priest | Title of S. Clemente, archbishop of Turin | 10 February 1478 | Sixtus IV | |
| Giovanni Conti | Roman | Cardinal-priest | Title of Ss. Nereo ed Achilleo, archbishop of Conza | 15 November 1483 | Sixtus IV | |
| Juan Margarit i Pau | Spanish | Cardinal-priest | Title of S. Vitale, bishop of Gerona | 15 November 1483 | Sixtus IV | |
| Giovanni Giacomo Sclafenati | Milanese | Cardinal-priest | Title of S. Stefano al Monte Celio, bishop of Parma | 15 November 1483 | Sixtus IV | |
| Francesco Todeschini-Piccolomini | Sienese | Cardinal-deacon | Deacon of S. Eustachio, bishop of Siena | 5 March 1460 | Pius II | Protodeacon; Future Pope Pius III |
| Gabriele Rangone, O.Min.Obs. | | Cardinal-deacon | Deacon of Ss. Sergio e Bacco, bishop of Agrigento | 10 December 1477 | Sixtus IV | |
| Giovanni Battista Savelli | Roman | Cardinal-deacon | Deacon of S. Nicola in Carcere Tulliano | 15 May 1480 | Sixtus IV | |
| Giovanni Colonna | Roman | Cardinal-deacon | Deacon of S. Maria in Aquiro | 15 May 1480 | Sixtus IV | |
| Giambattista Orsini | Roman | Cardinal-deacon | Deacon of S. Maria Nuova | 15 November 1483 | Sixtus IV | |
| Ascanio Sforza | Milanese | Cardinal-deacon | Deacon of Ss. Vito e Modesto | 17 March 1484 | Sixtus IV | |

=== Absentee cardinals ===
| Elector | Nationality | Order | Title | Elevated | Elevator | Notes |
|---|---|---|---|---|---|---|
| Luis Juan del Milà | Spanish | Cardinal-priest | Title of Ss. IV Coronati, bishop of Lérida | 17 September 1456 | Callixtus III | |
| Thomas Bourchier | English | Cardinal-priest | Title of S. Ciriaco, Archbishop of Canterbury | 18 September 1467 | Paul II | |
| Jean Balue | French | Cardinal-bishop | Title of S. Susanna, Bishop of Albano, bishop of Angers | 18 September 1467 | Paul II | |
| Pedro González de Mendoza | Spanish | Cardinal-priest | Title of S. Croce in Gerusalemme, archbishop of Sevilla and administrator of Sigùenza | 7 May 1473 | Sixtus IV | |
| Charles II, Duke of Bourbon | French | Cardinal-priest | Title of Ss. Silvestro e Martino ai Monti, archbishop of Lyon | 18 December 1476 | Sixtus IV | |
| Pierre de Foix, le jeune | French | Cardinal-deacon | Deacon of Ss. Cosma e Damiano, bishop of Vannes | 18 December 1476 | Sixtus IV | |
| Paolo Fregoso | Genoese | Cardinal-priest | Title of S. Anastasia, archbishop of Genoa | 15 May 1480 | Sixtus IV | |
