= Cardinal of Milan =

The Cardinal of Milan may refer to:

- Stefano Nardini (d. 1484), Archbishop of Milan 1461–84, Cardinal 1473-84
- Giovanni Arcimboldi (d. 1488), Archbishop of Milan 1484–88, Cardinal 1473-84
