= Giovanni Michiel =

Italian Roman Catholic cardinal and bishop

- Titular Patriarch of Constantinople
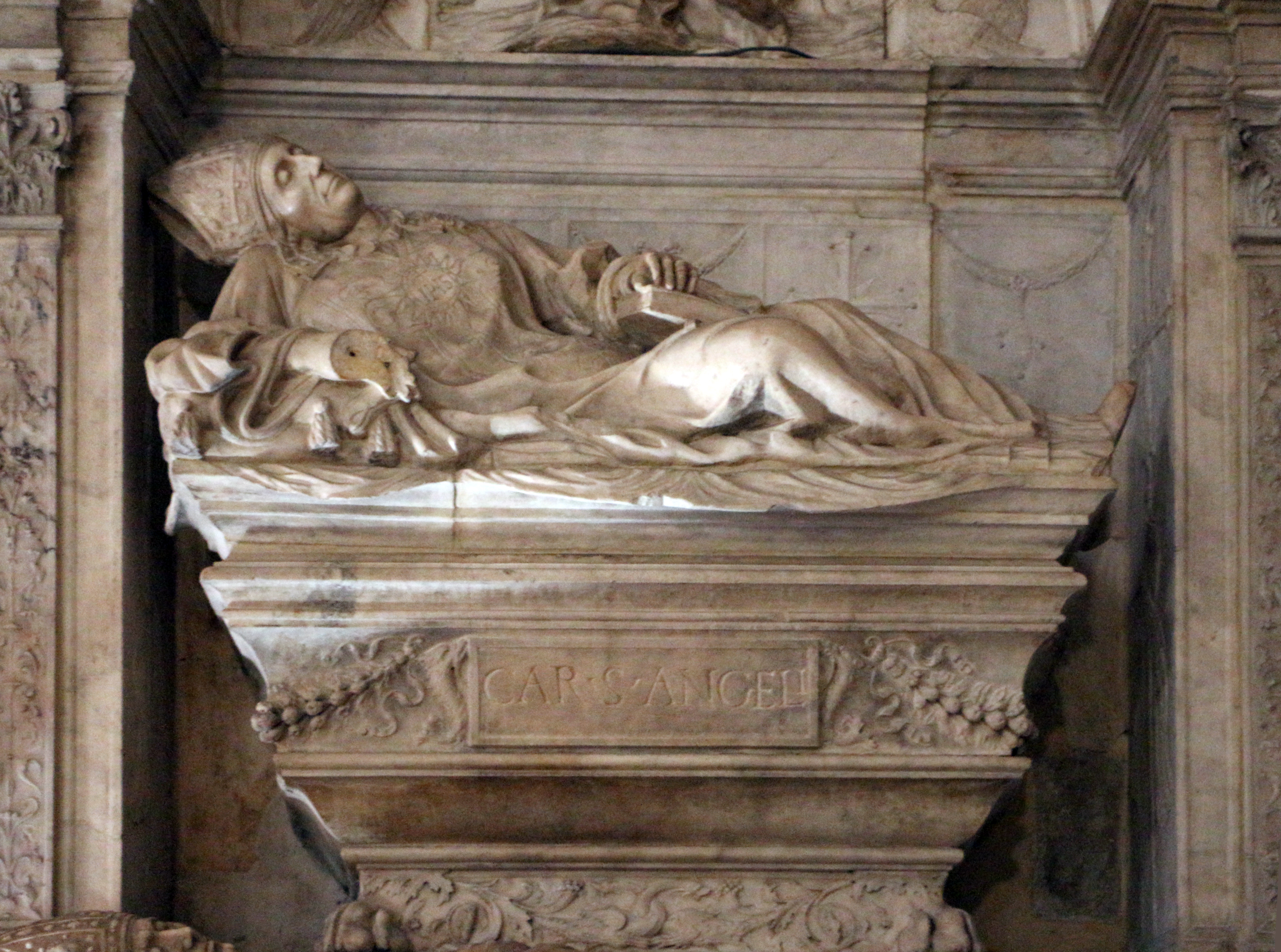
- Church: Catholic Church
- See: Latin Patriarchate of Constantinople
- In office: 23 December 1497 – 10 April 1503
- Predecessor: Hieronymus Landus
- Successor: Juan de Borja Lanzol de Romaní, el mayor
- Other posts: Cardinal-Bishop of Porto e Santa Rufina (1492-1503); Bishop of Verona (1471-1503); Cardinal-Priest of Sant'Angelo in Pescheria (1470-1503)
- Previous posts: Cardinal-Bishop of Palestrina (1491-1492); Cardinal-Bishop of Albano (1491); Cardinal-Priest of San Marcello (1484-1491); Cardinal-Deacon of Santa Lucia in Septisolio (1468-1470)

Orders
- Created cardinal: 21 November 1468 by Pope Paul II

Personal details
- Born: c. 1446 Venice, Republic of Venice
- Died: 10 April 1503 (aged 56–57) Rome, Papal States

Giovanni Michiel (* 1446 or 1447, died 1503) was an Italian Roman Catholic cardinal and bishop.

== Biography ==
Giovanni Michiel was born in Venice sometime between April 1446 and April 1447, the son of Lorenzo Michiel and Nicolosa Barbo, sister of the future Pope Paul II. A cousin, Giovanni Battista Zeno, was also a cardinal (1468).

Early in his career, Michiel served as a protonotary apostolic. During this time, he lived with his uncle in the Apostolic Palace.

His uncle made him a cardinal deacon in the consistory of 21 November 1468. He received the red hat and the deaconry of Santa Lucia in Septisolio on 22 November 1468. He opted for the deaconry of Sant'Angelo in Pescheria ca. 1470.

He was named Bishop of Verona in commendam on 18 March 1471; his entry into the see was delayed by the conflict between the Republic of Venice and the Holy See, but then occupied the office until his death.

He participated in the papal conclave of 1471 that elected Pope Sixtus IV. He left Rome with the pope on 10 June 1476 because of an outbreak of bubonic plague, traveling to Viterbo and Foligno; they returned to Rome on 23 October. He opted to become a cardinal priest ca. 1484, taking the titular church of San Marcello al Corso, though retaining Sant'Angelo in Pescheria in commendam.

He participated in the papal conclave of 1484 that elected Pope Innocent VIII. On 15 September 1484 he succeeded the incoming pope as Camerlengo of the Sacred College of Cardinals, and was elected to the post on 9 January 1485 until 11 January 1486. The pope named him Bishop of Padua, but the Republic of Venice opposed this appointment and sequestered his revenues, with the result that Michiel resigned the see in March 1487. On 4 June 1486 he was named legate a latare to the Patrimonium Sancti Petri and to the fortresses and castles of the Holy See. He was named Inspector of the papal army raised against Ferdinand I of Naples and later led the negotiations that led to a peace treaty signed on 11 August 1487.

On 14 March 1491 he opted to become a cardinal bishop, taking the suburbicarian see of Albano. On 10 October 1491 he opted for the suburbicarian see of Palestrina.

He participated in the papal conclave of 1492 that elected Pope Alexander VI. On 31 August 1492 the pope named him suburbicarian bishop of Porto e Santa Rufina.

When, as part of the Italian War of 1494–1498, French troops entered Rome on 27 May 1495 he and the pope left Rome for Orvieto. He was named (titular) Latin Patriarch of Antioch on 23 January 1497.

He died in Rome on 10 April 1503, two days after he was poisoned by his cook on the orders of Cesare Borgia. He is buried in San Marcello al Corso.

== See also ==
Catholic Church titles
Preceded by Giovanni Battista Cibo	Camerlengo of the Sacred College of Cardinals; 1484–85	Succeeded by Jorge da Costa
