= Giovanni d'Aragona =

Giovanni d'Aragona may refer to:

- Giovanni d'Aragona (1456–1485), Italian Roman Catholic cardinal
- Giovanni Vincenzo Acquaviva d'Aragona (c. 1490–1546), Italian Roman Catholic cardinal

== See also ==
- John of Aragon (disambiguation)
- John, Duke of Randazzo (1317–1348)
- John, Prince of Asturias (1478–1497)
- Juan II de Ribagorza (1457–1528)
