= Giovanni Angelo Arcimboldi =

Roman Catholic prelate

Most Reverend Giovanni Angelo Arcimboldi
- Archbishop of Milan
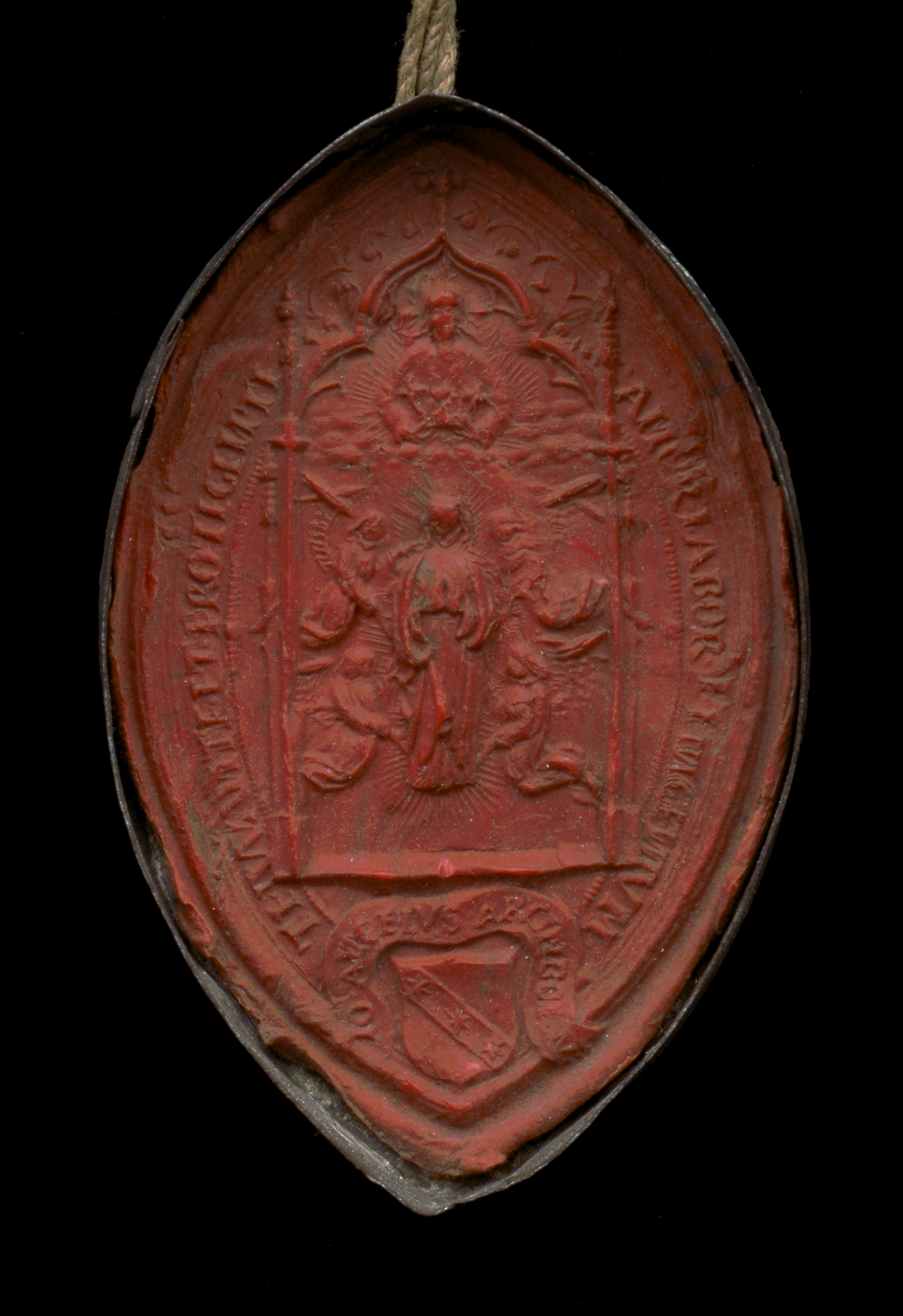
- Giovanni Angelo Arcimboldi's seal from 1518 or 1519.
- Church: Catholic Church
- Archdiocese: Archdiocese of Milan
- In office: 1526–1550
- Predecessor: Ippolito II d'Este
- Successor: Ippolito II d'Este
- Previous post: Bishop of Novara

Orders
- Consecration: 22 May 1526 by Antonio Maria Ciocchi del Monte

Personal details
- Born: 27 September 1485 Milan, Italy
- Died: 6 April 1555 (aged 69)

Giovanni Angelo Arcimboldi (1485–1555) was an Italian prelate, who became Bishop of Novara and Archbishop of Milan (1550–1555). He was the great-nephew of Guido Antonio Arcimboldi, who was also the Archbishop of Milan (1489–1489), and he was the grandson of Giovanni Arcimboldi, who was the Cardinal Archbishop of Milan (1484–1488).

== Biography ==
Giovanni Angelo Arcimboldi was born in Milan, Italy on 27 September 1485. He was the grandson of Giovanni Arcimboldi, who was the Cardinal Archbishop of Milan.

In 1508, he rediscovered books 1–6 of Tacitus' Annals at the Princely Abbey of Corvey.

On 2 March 1526, Arcimboldi was appointed during the papacy of Pope Clement VII as Bishop of Novara. On 22 May 1526, he was consecrated bishop by Antonio Maria Ciocchi del Monte, Cardinal-Bishop of Porto e Santa Rufina, with Giovanni Maria Ciocchi del Monte, Archbishop of Manfredonia, and Bernardo Ruggieri, Bishop of Sora, serving as co-consecrators.

On 19 March 1550, he was appointed during the papacy of Pope Julius III as Archbishop of Milan, in which capacity he served until his death on 6 April 1555.

== Episcopal succession ==
While bishop, he was the principal consecrator of:

- Francesco Bernardino Simonetta, Bishop of Perugia (1540); and
- Martín Pérez de Ayala, Bishop of Guadix (1548).

== External links and additional sources ==
- Cheney, David M. "Diocese of Novara". Catholic-Hierarchy.org. (for Chronology of Bishops) ^{[self-published]}
- Chow, Gabriel. "Diocese of Novara (Italy)". GCatholic.org. (for Chronology of Bishops) ^{[self-published]}

Catholic Church titles
Preceded by Ermete Stampa	Bishop of Novara; 1550–1555	Succeeded by Ippolito II d'Este
Preceded by Ippolito II d'Este	Archbishop of Milan; 1526–1550	Succeeded by Ippolito II d'Este
