= Ausiàs Despuig =

Catholic cardinal

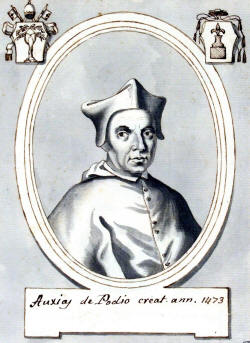
Cardenal Ausias Despuig Portrait

Ausias Despuig (born in Xàtiva in Spain, died 3 September 1483 in Rome) was a cardinal of the Catholic Church.

== Biography ==
He was made cardinal on the 7 May 1473 by Pope Sixtus IV. He was then archbishop of Monreale in Sicily.

He became archbishop of Zaragoza in Spain in 1475, but was stripped of the post in 1478 because of his disagreements with King John II of Aragon. He was also bishop of Capaccio, a suffragan of the archbishop of Salerno, from 1476 to 1483.

Catholic Church titles
Preceded by Joannes Soler	Archbishop of Monreale; 1458–1483	Succeeded by Juan de Borja Lanzol de Romaní, el mayor
Preceded by Peter von Schaumberg	Cardinal-Priest of San Vitale; 1473–1477	Succeeded by Cristoforo della Rovere
Preceded by Juan de Aragón	Administrator of Zaragoza; 1475–1478	Succeeded by Alfonso de Aragón
Preceded by Louis de Fenollet	Bishop of Capaccio; 1479–1483	Succeeded by Ludovico Podocathor
Preceded by Berardo Eroli	Cardinal-Priest of Santa Sabina; 1477–1483	Succeeded by Jean Bilhères de Lagraulas
Preceded by Stefano Nardini	Camerlengo of the Sacred College of Cardinals; 1482	Succeeded by Giovanni Arcimboldi
