= Philippe de Lévis =

French cardinal

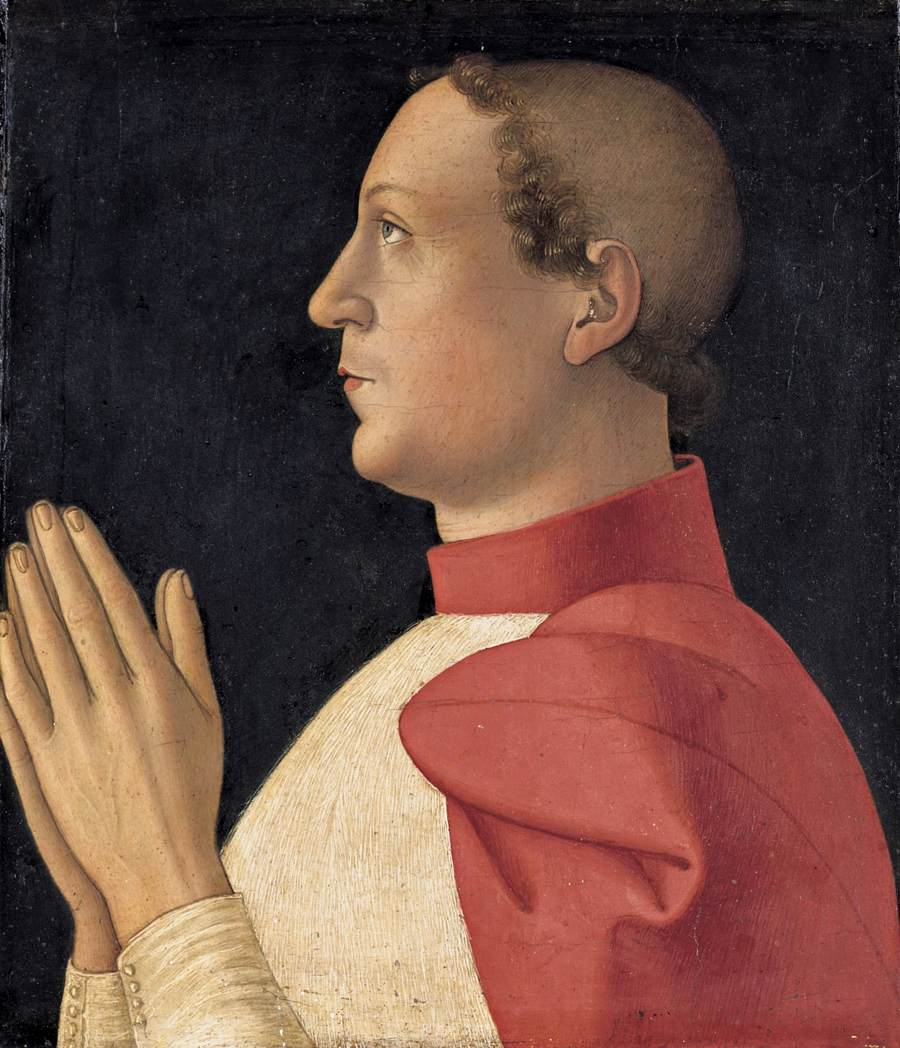
Portrait of Cardinal Philippe de Lévis by Antoniazzo Romano.

Philippe de Lévis (1435–1475) (called the Cardinal of Arles) was a French Roman Catholic bishop and cardinal.

He was born in the Kingdom of France on 4 November 1435, the son of Eustache de Lévis, baron of Quelus, and his wife Adelaïde de Cusan.

Early in his life, Lévis became a protonotary apostolic. He was ordained as a deacon.

On 29 March 1454 he was elected Archbishop of Auch. He received the pallium on 29 November 1454. On 24 March 1463 he was transferred to the metropolitan see of Arles.

At the request of René of Anjou, Pope Sixtus IV made him a cardinal priest in the consistory of 7 May 1473. He received the red hat in the Basilica di Santa Maria Maggiore on 10 May 1473, and the titular church of Santi Marcellino e Pietro al Laterano on 17 May 1473.

He died in Rome on 4 November 1475. He is buried above the holy door in the Basilica di Santa Maria Maggiore.

Eustache de Lévis (d. 22 avril 1489) was the successor of his brother as archbishop of Arles (1475-1489). He helped transfer Provence to the king of France in 1483. On his death, Eustache was buried together with his brother at S. Maria Maggiore.
