= Bertrandus Vaqueras =

French singer, composer and poet

Bertrandus Vaqueras (1450-before 1507) was a French Renaissance singer, composer, and poet, who was likely born in Vacqueyras and died in Rome. Some documents list his surname as Vassadelli, suggesting he was a member of the Vassadel family, lords of the town of Vacqueyras. He held several benefices in northern France, as well as canonries in the Liège Cathedral and the Basilica of Our Lady in Tongeren.

== Life ==
Vaqueras was first recorded in Rome in 1481 as a contrabass singer in the choir of St. Peter's. In 1483 he joined the papal chapel, hired by Pope Sixtus IV where he spent the rest of his career. His poetry shows that he was likely a humanist. In one of his surviving poems, Bertrandus de Vaqueirassio Antonio Flaminio, he begs his friend Antonio Flaminio, a humanist, to return to Rome. This poem connects him to humanist circles in Rome, suggesting that he was one as well. More of his poems, along with the aforementioned poem, are found in the Vatican Library.

== Music ==
Most of Vaqueras' works are found in manuscripts from the papal chapel. In the archives are two masses, two settings of the Credo, three motets, and one chanson. Of all his preserved music, Domine non secundum peccata is the only sacred work to be printed. The text from this motet was also set by Josquin, his contemporary at the Sistine Chapel. It is believed that Vaqueras' version of the motet came first and Josquin edited it later.

== Works ==
=== Chansons ===
- Veci la danse barbari

=== Masses ===
- Missa "L'homme armé"
- Missa "Du bon du ceur"

=== Motets ===
- Ave regina coelorum
- Domine non secundum peccata
- Rex fallax miraculum
