= Guido Antonio Arcimboldi =

Italian prelate

Most Reverend Guido Antonio Arcimboldi
- Archbishop of Milan
- Church: Catholic Church
- Diocese: Archdiocese of Milan

Personal details
- Born: 1428
- Died: 1497 (aged 68–69)

Guido Antonio Arcimboldi (1428–1497), also known as Guidantonio Arcimboldi, was an Italian prelate, who served as Archbishop of Milan (1489–1497). He succeeded his brother, Giovanni Arcimboldi, who was Cardinal Archbishop of Milan (1484–1488). And his great-nephew Giovanni Angelo Arcimboldi would also become Archbishop of Milan (1550–1555).

== Life ==
Born in Parma, he was the son of Nicolò Arcimboldo, who was the treasurer of the Duchy of Milan, and his wife Orsina Canossa (descendant of the family of Empress Matilde di Canossa). He studied law. In 1469, he was named lord of Pandino and in 1484, he was named lord of Arcisate. In 1488, after the death of his brother, the Archbishop of Milan, Giovanni he was selected as the Archbishop of Milan. He died in 1497.

Catholic Church titles
Preceded by Giovan IV Arcimboldi	Archbishop of Milan; 1488–1497	Succeeded by Ottaviano Arcimboldi
