= Ermete Stampa =

Most Reverend Ermete Stampa
- Bishop-elect of Novara
- Church: Catholic Church
- Diocese: Roman Catholic Diocese of Novara
- In office: 1525–1526
- Predecessor: Antonio Maria Ciocchi del Monte
- Successor: Giovanni Angelo Arcimboldi

Personal details
- Born: Milan, Italy
- Died: 1526 Novara, Italy

Ermete Stampa (died 1526) was a Roman Catholic prelate who served as Bishop-elect of Novara (1525–1526).

== Biography ==
Ermete Stampa was born in Milan, Italy. On 20 December 1525, Ermete Stampa was appointed during the papacy of Pope Clement VII as Bishop of Novara. He died before he was consecrated in 1526.

== External links and additional sources ==
- Cheney, David M. "Diocese of Novara". Catholic-Hierarchy.org. (for Chronology of Bishops) ^{[self-published]}
- Chow, Gabriel. "Diocese of Novara (Italy)". GCatholic.org. (for Chronology of Bishops) ^{[self-published]}

Catholic Church titles
Preceded by Antonio Maria Ciocchi del Monte	Bishop of Novara; 1525–1526	Succeeded by Giovanni Angelo Arcimboldi
