= Giovanni Colonna (cardinal, 1456–1508) =

Italian XV century Cardinal (1456–1508)

- Cardinal-Deacon of Santa Maria in Aquiro; Bishop of Rieti; Archpriest of the Archbasilica of Saint John Lateran
- Church: Roman Catholic
- See: Rieti
- Predecessor: Angelo Capranica
- Successor: Pompeo Colonna

Orders
- Ordination: 1503
- Consecration: 10 November 1480
- Created cardinal: 15 May 1480 by Pope Sixtus IV

Personal details
- Born: 1456 Rome, Papal States
- Died: 26 September 1508 (age 51/52) Rome, Papal States

Giovanni Colonna (1456 – 26 September 1508) was a Roman Catholic cardinal of the High Renaissance period, a member of the famous Colonna family.

== Biography ==
Colonna was born in Rome in 1456, a grandson of Lorenzo Onofrio Colonna, Count of the Marsi.

He was created a cardinal by Pope Sixtus IV in the consistory of 15 May 1480 and was made bishop of Rieti on 10 November of that year. He participated in the conclaves of 1484, 1492, September 1503 and October 1503. Colonna died in 1508. Colonna's funeral oration was written by Battista Casali. Giovanni Colonna's nephew Pompeo Colonna succeeded him as Bishop of Rieti.

== Cultural depictions ==
Cardinal Colonna appears in the 2011 TV series Borgia, played by Karel Dobrý.

Catholic Church titles
Preceded by	Cardinal-Deacon of Santa Maria in Aquiro; 1480–1508	Succeeded by Luigi d'Aragona
Preceded by Fazio Gallerani	Administrator of Rieti; 1480–1508	Succeeded by Pompeo Colonna
Preceded by Giuliano della Rovere	Archpriest of the Arcibasilica di San Giovanni in Laterano; 1503–1508	Succeeded by Alessandro Farnese
