= Juan de Aragón (archbishop of Zaragoza) =

Spanish Roman Catholic prelate (1439–1475)

Most Reverend Juan de Aragón
- Archbishop of Zaragoza
- Church: Catholic Church
- Archdiocese: Zaragoza
- In office: 1458–1475
- Predecessor: Dalmacio del Mur
- Successor: Ausias Despuig

Personal details
- Born: 1439 Spain
- Died: 19 November 1475 (age 36)

Juan de Aragón (1439–1475) was a Roman Catholic prelate who served as Archbishop of Zaragoza (1458–1475).

== Biography ==
Juan de Aragón was born in Spain in 1439, the illegitimate son of John II of Aragon. On 30 June 1458, he was appointed during the papacy of Pope Callixtus III as Archbishop of Zaragoza. He served as Archbishop of Zaragoza until his death on 19 November 1475.

While bishop, he was the principal consecrator of Pedro Baldó, Bishop of Segorbe-Albarracin (1461); and Jaime Perez de Valencia, Titular Bishop of Christopolis and Auxiliary Bishop of Valencia (1469).

== External links and additional sources ==
- Cheney, David M. "Archdiocese of Zaragoza". Catholic-Hierarchy.org. (for Chronology of Bishops) ^{[self-published]}
- Chow, Gabriel. "Metropolitan Archdiocese of Zaragoza (Spain)". GCatholic.org. (for Chronology of Bishops) ^{[self-published]}

Catholic Church titles
Preceded by Dalmacio del Mur	Archbishop of Zaragoza; 1458–1475	Succeeded by Ausias Despuig
