= Hieronymus Landus =

- Titular Patriarch of Constantinople
- Church: Catholic Church
- See: Latin Patriarchate of Constantinople
- In office: 9 March 1474 – c. 1493
- Predecessor: Pietro Riario
- Successor: Giovanni Michiel
- Previous posts: Archbishop of Candia (1458-c. 1493)

Personal details
- Died: c. 1493

Hieronymus Landus (also Jerome Lando) (dates uncertain, probably died in 1479) was a Latin Archbishop of Crete. Although he was not technically a papal nuncio, in 1459 Landus became one of the first papal delegates to Poland. He was sent on a diplomatic mission to Kraków by Pope Pius II to try to end the Thirteen Years' War (1454–66) between the Kingdom of Poland allied with the Prussian Confederation, and the Order of the Teutonic Knights. Landus hoped to garner support from Casimir IV against the Ottomans who had captured Constantinople in 1453. However, the war against the Teutonic Knights continued for another seven years, and Constantinople remained in Turkish hands.

Nevertheless, the Holy See continued to send papal legates, and the first permanent Apostolic Nuncio in Poland was Bishop Luigi Lippomano, appointed in 1555 by Pope Julius III and sent to the Polish by Pope Paul IV.

Landus was titular Latin Patriarch of Constantinople from 1474-c.1496.
