= Eusebius of Mâcon =

Saint Eusebius of Mâcon was a 6th-century bishop of Mâcon in France.

He is known to have attended the Second Council of Mâcon in 581 and Third Council of Mâcon in 581 and 585.

He is considered a saint of the Roman Catholic Church.
