= Giovanni Battista Zeno =

Italian cardinal

Cardinal (Giovanni) Battista Zeno
- Cardinal-Bishop
- Church: Santa Maria in Portico; Sant'Anastasia
- Diocese: Vicenza (1470–1501); Tusculum (Frascati)

Orders
- Created cardinal: 18 September 1467 by Pope Paul II
- Rank: Cardinal Deacon, Cardinal Priest, then Cardinal Bishop of Tusculum

Personal details
- Born: 1439/1440 Venice
- Died: 8 May 1501 Padua
- Buried: San Marco, Venice
- Residence: Venice, Vicenza, Rome
- Parents: Niccolò di Tomà Zeno; Elisabetta Barbo
- Occupation: diplomat, administrator
- Profession: bishop

Giovanni Battista Zeno (or Zen) (died 8 May 1501), was the son of Niccolo di Tomà Zeno and Elisabetta Barbo, a sister of Pietro Barbo, who became Pope Paul II in August 1464. He was a bishop and a cardinal of the Catholic Church.

== Biography ==
Zeno, usually called Baptista or Battista in documents, was born in Venice in 1439 or 1440. He was raised in Rome by his uncle, Cardinal Pietro Barbo.

Giovanni Battista was appointed a protonotary apostolic on 25 June 1467, the first known office in his career.

He was appointed a cardinal by his uncle, Pope Paul II on 21 November 1468, and named cardinal-deacon of Santa Maria in Porticu. On 4 May (March?) 1469, he departed Rome for Perugia, where he had been appointed papal legate. His successor was appointed on 8 January 1470.

When his third cousin, Bishop Marco Bembo of Vicenza, was named Patriarch of Aquileia on 18 March 1470, Zeno was appointed Bishop of Vicenza ih his place. The date and circumstances of his episcopal consecration are not known. He was a bishop by 1479, since in that year he was the principal consecrator of Giovanni Paternione, Bishop of Malta. Also in March 1470, he was promoted cardinal-priest of the titular church of Sant'Anastasia al Palatino.

In August 1470, Cardinal Zeno was appointed Archpriest of the Vatican Basilica. At the coronation of Pope Innocent VIII (Cibò) on 12 September 1484, Zeno acted as host at the coronation luncheon, which was held in the house of the Archpriest of St. Peter's Basilica, in the southeast corner of the atrium of the basilica.

Cardinal Zeno, the cardinal of S. Maria in Portico, took part in the papal conclave of 1471. He voted for Cardinal Bartolomeo Rovarella, for his cousin Marco Barbo, and finally for Cardinal Francesco della Rovere, who was elected Pope Sixtus IV on 9 August. Zeno received no votes himself.

In the autumn of 1471, the government of Venice announced that it had uncovered a spy ring, which was passing on state secrets to the pope. Members of the families of the Zeno, Barbo, Trevisan and Contarini were involved, and at the head of the conspiracy were Cardinal Zeno and his mother Elisabetta. In February 1472, sentences were announced by the Council of Ten. Elisabetta was sent to the Istrian town of Koper (Capo d'Istria), where she was to be confined for life. The cardinal had all of his benefices confiscated in the territories ruled by Venice. This included his bishopric of Vicenza, which he was unable to visit to be installed until 1477. On 18 February 1477, Pope Sixtus IV wrote a letter to Doge Andrea Vendramino, thanking him for having Cardinal Zeno and Cardinal Giovanni Michiel placed in possession of their dioceses, and absolving him from the ecclesiastical censures which fell upon those who had deprived them of the income of their bishoprics. On the same day, Cardinal Zeno signed a document absolving the government of Venice of all moral and material blame for the sequestration of his benefices and the diocese of Vicenza.

On 9 June 1477, Cardinal Zeno was appointed papal legate to Venice and Vicenza. He departed Rome on 22 August 1477, and returned on 18 December.

In the papal consistory of 8 October 1479, Pope Sixtus IV promoted Zeno to the Order of Cardinal Bishops, and granted him the Suburbicarian diocese of Tusculum (Frascati).

Cardinal Zeno, Bishop of Tusculum, participated in the conclave of August 1484, as the loyal supporter of his cousin, Marco Barbo, who nearly succeeded in becoming pope. He was, however, hated by Cardinal Rodrigo Borgia, and Cardinals Giuliano della Rovere and Giovanni Battista Cibò were willing to engage in simony and bribery to elect Cibò. Zeno was not a party to those transactions.

In the conclave of August 1492, Cardinal Zeno was considered by some as worthy of being pope. He managed to acquire 5 votes on the second scrutiny. But the struggle was between Cardinal Rodrigo Borgia and Cardinal Giuliano della Rovere, both of whom engaged in extensive simony and bribery. The new pope, Alexander VI, needed a grand place to establish his daughter Lucrezia, and he therefore exchanged the Palazzo of S. Maria in Portico, which Cardinal Zeno had been building (1483), for the commenda of Santa Maria delle Carceri in Este. Zeno left Rome permanently, ignoring demands of the pope that he return.

He died in Padua, on 8 May 1501, at the age of 62, according to his memorial inscription.

The Zeno Chapel in St Mark's Basilica, Venice, was built to contain his tomb. In his lifetime he had spent 5,000 gold ducats on the chapel in S. Marco where his funeral monument was placed.

== Sources ==
- De Blasi, Guido (2020). "Zeno, Giovanni Battista." (in Italian). In: Dizionario Biografico degli Italiani Volume 100 (2020).
- Cardella, Lorenzo (1793). Memorie storiche de' cardinali della Santa Romana Chiesa. (in Italian). Tomo III. (Rome: Pagliarini, 1793), pp. 175-176.
- Eubel, Conradus, ed. (1914). Hierarchia catholica. Vol. 2 (second ed.). Münster: Libreria Regensbergiana.
- Riccardi, Tommaso (1786). Storia Dei Vescovi Vicentini (in Italian). Vicenza: Vendramini Mosca.
- Soranzo, Giovanni. "Giovan Battista Zeno, nipote di Paolo II, cardinale di S.Maria in Portico (1468-1501)". (in Italian). In: Rivista di storia della Chiesa in Italia, Vol. 16 (1962), pp. 249-274.

Catholic Church titles
Preceded by	Cardinal-Deacon of Santa Maria in Portico; 1468–1470	Succeeded by Marco Cornaro
Preceded by Giacomo Tebaldi	Cardinal-Priest of Sant'Anastasia; 1470–1479	Succeeded by Paolo Fregoso
Preceded by Marco Barbo	Bishop of Vicenza; 1470–1501	Succeeded by Pietro Dandolo
Preceded by Giacomo Ammannati-Piccolomini	Cardinal-Bishop of Frascati; 1479–1501	Succeeded by Jorge da Costa
Preceded by Giuliano della Rovere	Camerlengo of the Sacred College of Cardinals; 1480	Succeeded by Stefano Nardini
