= John of Aragon =

John of Aragon may refer to:

- John of Aragon (patriarch) (1304–1334), Latin patriarch of Alexandria
- John I of Aragon (1350–1396), king of Aragon (from 1387)
- John II of Aragon (1398–1479), king of Aragon (from 1458) and Navarre (from 1425)
- Juan de Aragón (archbishop of Zaragoza) (d. 1475)
- John, Prince of Asturias (1478–1497), Aragonese infante and heir apparent
