= Philibert Hugonet =

French Roman Catholic bishop and cardinal

Philibert Hugonet (died 1484) (called the Cardinal of Mâcon) was a French Roman Catholic bishop and cardinal.

== Biography ==
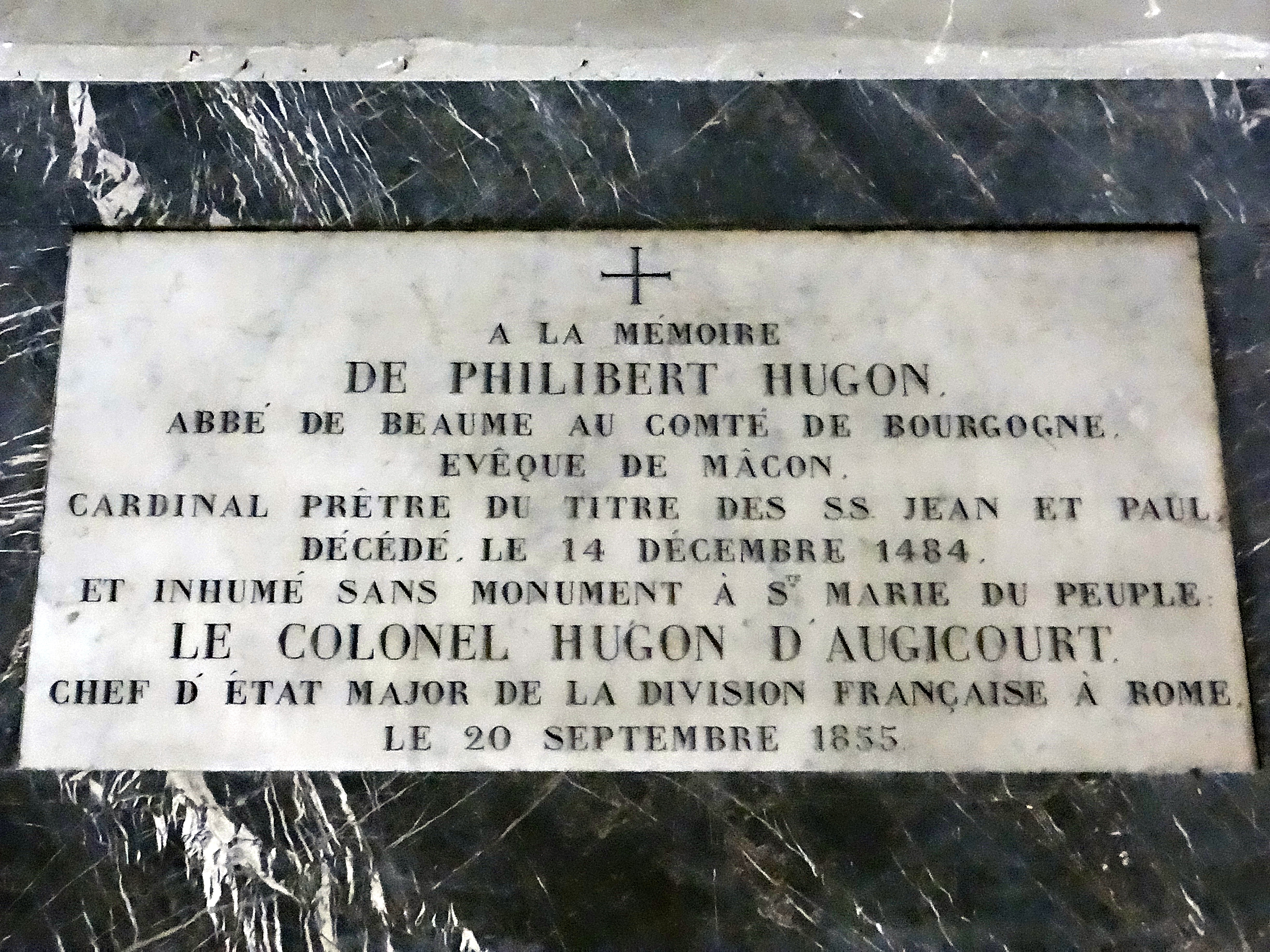
His memorial tablet in the Basilica of Santa Maria del Popolo where he was buried

Philibert Hugonet studied in the Diocese of Mâcon, where his uncle, Étienne Hugonet, had been bishop since 1451. He later spent six years studying at the University of Pavia, becoming a doctor of both laws.

After completing his education, he was a member of several embassies sent by Charles the Bold, notably embassies to Pope Paul II and to Fernando V of Castilla. His brother, Guillaume Hugonet, was the Chancellor of the Duchy of Burgundy during this period, until he was executed on April 3, 1477. He never returned to Flanders after the death of his brother.

Hugonet became a canon of Mâcon Cathedral and a protonotary apostolic. After the death of his uncle, he was elected the new Bishop of Mâcon on October 2, 1472, and subsequently occupied the see until his death.

At the request of Charles the Bold, Pope Sixtus IV made him a cardinal priest in the consistory of May 7, 1473. He received the red hat in the Basilica di Santa Maria Maggiore on May 10, 1473, and on May 17 was awarded the titulus of Santa Lucia in Selci (a deaconry raised pro illa vice to the status of titulus). On August 17, 1477, he opted for the titulus of Santi Giovanni e Paolo.

In December 1478, Sixtus IV made Cardinal Hugonet papal legate to Viterbo and the Patrimonium Sancti Petri. He left Italy for the Kingdom of France on May 15, 1480, returning on July 30, 1481.

On July 10, 1484, he was named Bishop of Autun without relinquishing the bishopric of Mâcon; he occupied the see of Autun until his death as well. The next month he participated in the papal conclave that elected Pope Innocent VIII. Two weeks after the conclave ended, on September 11, Hugonet died in his residence in Campo de' Fiori, Rome. He is buried in Santa Maria del Popolo.
