= Dalmacio de Mur y de Cervelló =

Roman Catholic archbishop

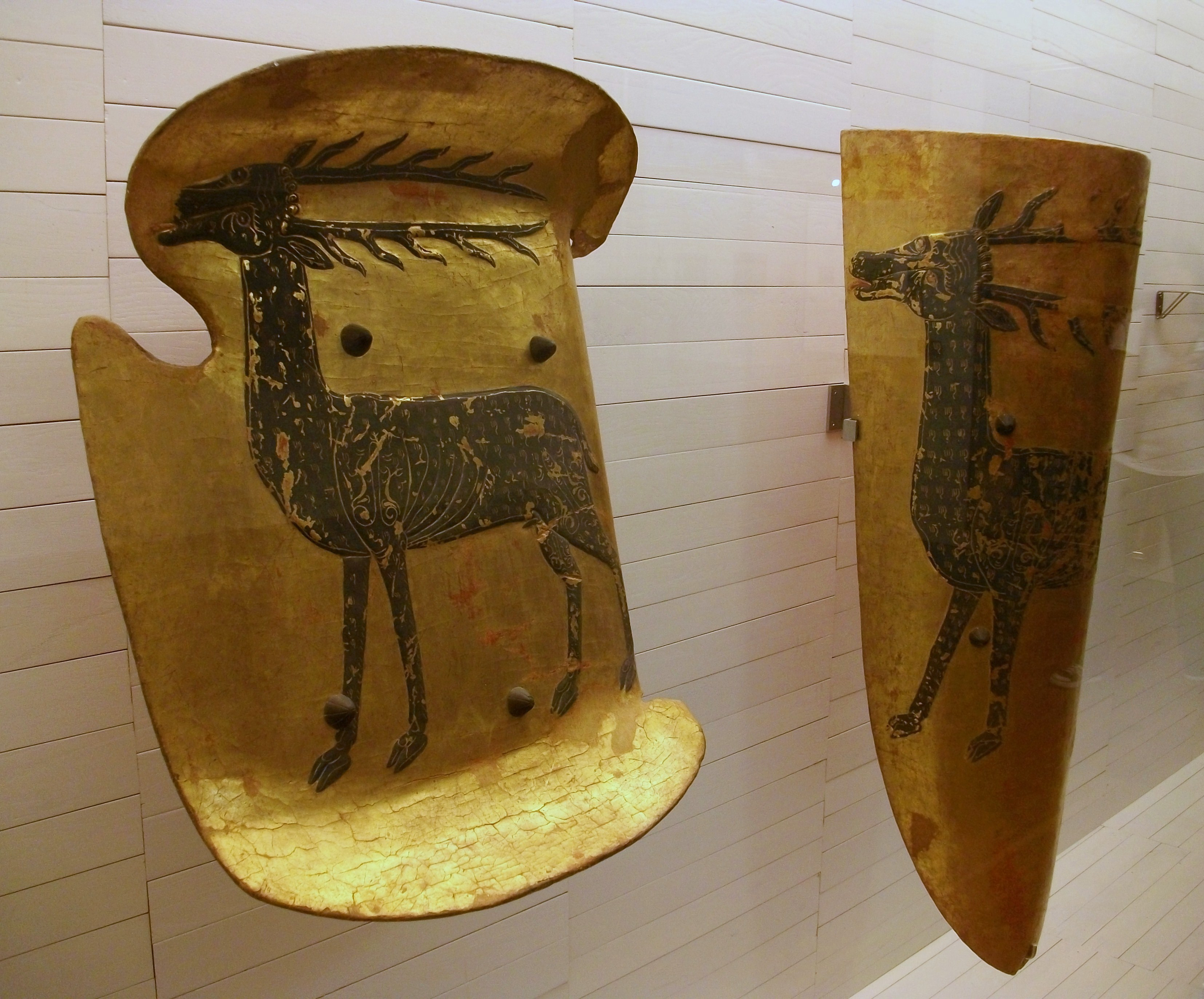
The shield and pavise of Dalmacio from the Charterhouse of Vall de Cristo, now in the Museo de Bellas Artes de Castellón

Dalmacio (or Dalmau) de Mur y de Cervelló (died 12 September 1456) was a Spanish prelate of the fifteenth century. He served as Bishop of Girona (1415–1418), Bishop of Tarragona (1419–1431), and finally Archbishop of Zaragoza (1431–1456).

Dalmacio de Mur y Cervelló was born at Cervera. He was a patron of the arts, embellishing with Gothic art the churches he served in. In 1426 he commissioned from the sculptor Pere Johan (active 1418–1458) the alabaster and wood retablo that still dominates the Cathedral of Tarragona. He was buried in the La Seo Cathedral of Zaragoza.
