= Ancient Diocese of Mâcon =

Former Catholic diocese in France

Coordinates: 46.3070°N 4.8354°E

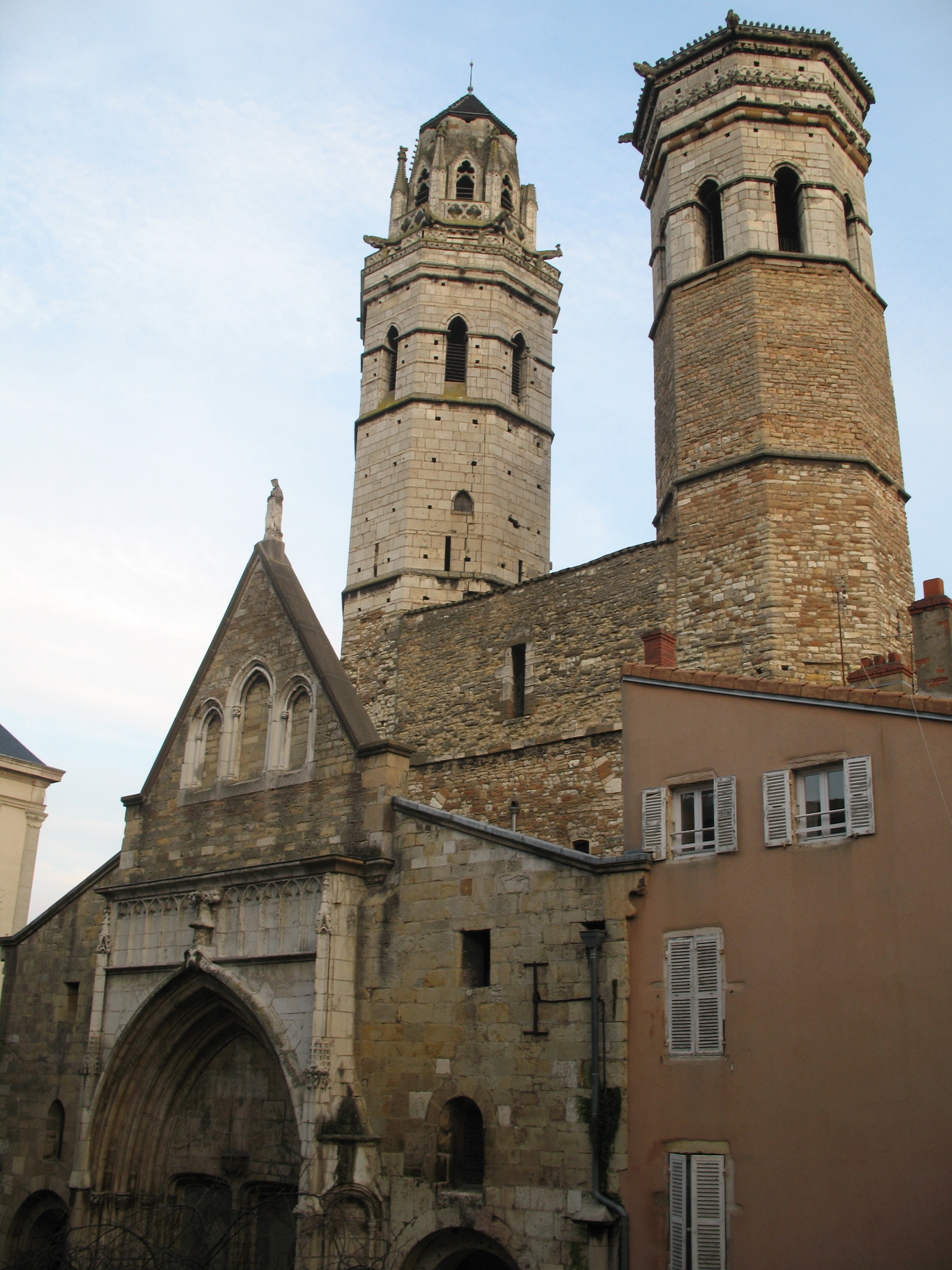
The former cathedral of Vieux Saint-Vincent at Mâcon.

The former bishopric of Mâcon was located in Burgundy. The bishopric of Macon was established as a suffragan of Lyon. The existence of Mâcon as a separate diocese ended at the French Revolution.

== History ==
The city of Mâcon, formerly the capital of the Mâconnais, now of the Department of Saône-et-Loire, became a civitas (Celtic tribal 'city state') in the 5th century, when it was separated from the Æduan territory. Christianity appears to have been introduced from Lugdunum (present Lyon) into this city at an early period, and Hugh, Archbishop of Lyon, in the eleventh century, would call Mâcon "the eldest daughter of the Church of Lyon".

The bishopric, however, came into existence somewhat later than might have been expected: in the latter part of the 5th century it was still a Bishop of Lyon who brought relief to the famine-stricken people of Mâcon. At the end of that same century Merovingian king Clovis's occupation of the city both foreshadowed the gradual establishment of Frankish supremacy, accompanied by a decline in Arianism in the see. Duchesne thinks that the bishopric of Mâcon, suffragan of Lyon, may have originated in an understanding between the Merovingian princes after the suppression of the Burgundian kingdom.

For many centuries the bishops seem to have been the only rulers of Mâcon; the city had no counts until after 850. From 926 the countship became hereditary. The Mâconnais was sold to king St. Louis in 1239 by Alice of Vienne, daughter of the last count, and her husband, Jean de Braine. In 1435 Charles VII of France, by the Treaty of Arras, ceded it to Philip, Duke of Burgundy, but in 1477 it reverted to France, upon the death of duke Charles the Bold. Emperor Charles V definitively recognized the Mâconnais as French at the Treaty of Cambrai in 1529.

The wars of religion filled Mâcon with blood; it was captured on 5 May 1562, by the Protestant Charles Balzac d'Entragues, on 18 August 1562, by the Catholic Tavannes, on 29 September 1567, it again fell into the hands of the Protestants, and on 4 December 1567, was recovered by the Catholics. But the Protestants of Mâcon were saved from the Massacre of St. Bartholomew, probably by the passive resistance with which the bailiff, Philibert de Laguiche, met the orders of king Charles IX of France. Odet de Coligny, known as Cardinal de Châtillon, who eventually became a Protestant and went to London to marry under the name of Comte de Beauvais, was from 1554 to 1560 prior, and after 1560 provost, of St-Pierre de Mâcon.

The Benedictine Abbey of Cluny, situated within the territory of this diocese, was exempted from its jurisdiction in the eleventh century, in spite of the opposition of Bishop Drogo. There is stilt preserved in the archives of the city a copy of the cartulary of the cathedral church of St-Vincent, rebuilt in the 13th century, but destroyed in 1793.

The existence of Mâcon as a separate diocese ended at the French Revolution, and the title of Mâcon is since borne by the Bishop of Autun.

== Councils of Mâcon ==
Of the six councils held at Mâcon (579, 581–or 582–585, 624, 906, 1286), the second and third, convoked by command of King Gontran, are worthy of special mention.

The second council, in 581 or 582, which assembled six metropolitans and fifteen bishops, enacted penalties against luxury among the clergy, against clerics who summoned other clerics before lay tribunals, and against religious who married; it also regulated the relations of Christians with Jews.

The third council, in 585, at which 43 bishops and the representatives of 20 other bishops assisted, tried the bishops accused of having taken part in the revolt of Gondebaud, fixed the penalties for violating the Sunday rest, insisted on the obligation of paying tithes, established the right of the bishop to interfere in the courts when widows and orphans were concerned, determined the relative precedence of clerics and laymen, and decreed that every three years a national synod should be convoked by the Bishop of Lyon and the king.

== Bishops ==
- 538-555: Placide of Mâcon
- 560: Salvin of Mâcon
- 567: Célidaine of Mâcon
- ~575: Nizier of Mâcon
- ~580: Justus of Macon
- 581-585: Eusebius of Mâcon
- ~590: Florentin of Mâcon
- 599-612: Déce
- ~612: Mummole
- 615-650: Dieudonné
- ~657: Aganon
- Déce II
- 743: Dumnole
- 801: Lédouard
- 813: Gondulphe
- 814-850: Hildebaud
- 853-862: Bredincus
- 864-873: Bernoud
- 875-878: Lambert
- 879-885: Gontard
- 886-926: Gérard de Mâcon
- 926: Adalran
- 927-936: Bernon
- 938-958: Maimbode
- 960-962: Théotelin
- 963-973: Adon
- 974-977: Jean
- ~979: Eudes
- 981-991: Milon
- 993-1018: Liébaud de Brancion
- 1019-1030: Gauslin
- 1031-1050: Gauthier de Brancion
- 1059-1073: Drogon
- 1073-1096: Landry de Berzé
- 1097-1123: Bérard de Châtillon
- 1124-1140: Jocerand de Baisenens
- 1140-1161: Ponce de Thoire
- 1164-1184: Étienne de Bâgé
- 1185-1197: Renaud de Vergny
- 1202-1219: Ponce de Rochebaron
- 1221-1241: Aymon
- 1242-1262: Seguin de Lugny
- 1262-1264: Jean de Damas
- 1264-1276: Guichard de Germolles
- 1277-1284: Pierre de La Jaisse
- 1284-1295: Hugues de Fontaines
- 1296-1316: Nicolas de Bar
- 1317-1358: Jean de Salagny
- 1363-1380: Philippe de Sainte-Croix
- 1382-1389: Jean de Boissy
- 1389-1397: Thiébaud de Rougemont
- 1398-1411: Pierre de Juys
- 1412-1417: Jean Christini
- 1418-1430: Geoffroy de Saint-Amour
- 1431-1433: Jean Le Jeune
- 1433-1434: Jean de Macet
- 1434-1448 and 1449-1473: Étienne Hugonet
- 1473-1484: Philibert Hugonet, cardinal
- 1485-1510: Étienne de Longvy
- 1510-1529: Claude de Longwy de Givry
- 1529-1531: François-Louis Chantereau
- 1531-1539: Charles de Hémard de Denonville, cardinal
- 1541-1542: Antoine de Narbonne
- 1542-1545: François de Faucon
- 1544-1551: Pierre du Châtel
- 1552-1554: François de Faucon
- 1557-1559: Amanieu de Foix
- 1559-1582: Jean-Baptiste l'Alamanni
- 1583-1599: Luc Alamanni
- 1599-1619: Gaspard Dinet
- 1620-1650: Louis Dinet
- 1651-1665: Jean de Lingendes
- 1665-1666: Guillaume Le Boux
- 1666-1676: Michel Colbert de Saint-Pouange
- 1677-1682: Michel Cassagnet de Tilladet (also bishop of Clermont)
- 1682-1684: Claude II de Saint-Georges
- 1684-1731: Michel Cassagnet de Tilladet
- 1732-1763: Henri-Constance de Lort de Sérignan de Valras
- 1763-1790: Gabriel François Moreau

== See also ==
- Catholic Church in France
- List of Catholic dioceses in France

== Bibliography ==
=== Reference works ===
- Gams, Pius Bonifatius (1873). Series episcoporum Ecclesiae catholicae: quotquot innotuerunt a beato Petro apostolo. Ratisbon: Typis et Sumptibus Georgii Josephi Manz. (Use with caution; obsolete)
- Eubel, Conradus, ed. (1913). Hierarchia catholica, Tomus 1 (second ed.). Münster: Libreria Regensbergiana. (in Latin)
- Eubel, Conradus, ed. (1914). Hierarchia catholica, Tomus 2 (second ed.). Münster: Libreria Regensbergiana. (in Latin)
- Gulik, Guilelmus (1923). Eubel, Conradus (ed.). Hierarchia catholica, Tomus 3 (second ed.). Münster: Libreria Regensbergiana.
- Gauchat, Patritius (Patrice) (1935). Hierarchia catholica IV (1592-1667). Münster: Libraria Regensbergiana.
- Ritzler, Remigius; Sefrin, Pirminus (1952). Hierarchia catholica medii et recentis aevi V (1667-1730). Patavii: Messagero di S. Antonio.
- Ritzler, Remigius; Sefrin, Pirminus (1958). Hierarchia catholica medii et recentis aevi VI (1730-1799). Patavii: Messagero di S. Antonio.

=== Studies ===
- Duchesne, Louis (1910). Fastes épiscopaux de l'ancienne Gaule: II. L'Aquitaine et les Lyonnaises. Paris: Fontemoing.
- Du Tems, Hugues (1774). Le clergé de France, ou tableau historique et chronologique des archevêques, évêques, abbés, abbesses et chefs des chapitres principaux du royaume, depuis la fondation des églises jusqu'à nos jours (in French). Vol. Tome premier. Paris: Delalain.
- Jean, Armand (1891). Les évêques et les archevêques de France depuis 1682 jusqu'à 1801 (in French). Paris: A. Picard. p. 78.
