= Stefano Nardini =

Italian Roman Catholic bishop and cardinal

- Archbishop of Milan
- Church: Catholic Church
- Archdiocese: Archdiocese of Milan
- In office: 13 November 1461 – 22 October 1484
- Predecessor: Carlo da Forlì
- Successor: Giovanni Arcimboldi
- Other post: Cardinal-Priest of Santa Maria in Trastevere (1476-1484)
- Previous post: Cardinal-Priest of Sant'Adriano al Foro (1473-1476)

Orders
- Created cardinal: 7 May 1473 by Pope Sixtus IV

Personal details
- Born: Forlì, Romagna, Papal States
- Died: 22 October 1484 Rome, Papal States

Stefano Nardini (died 1484) (called the Cardinal of Milan) was an Italian Roman Catholic bishop and cardinal.

== Biography ==
Stefano Nardini was born in Forlì. He received a doctorate of both laws.

As a young man, Nardini served in the military, before joining the ecclesiastical estate and traveling to Rome. He became a canon of Ferrara Cathedral, and later General Treasurer of the Marche. During the pontificate of Pope Callixtus III, he was governor of Romagna. Under Pope Pius II, he was a referendary, and later, a protonotary apostolic. He then served as Pius II's nuncio to Germany; the pope wrote to him on 15 July 1459 about the advance of the Ottoman Empire in the Kingdom of Bosnia.

On 13 November 1461 he was elected Archbishop of Milan. He occupied that see until his death. He then served as a nuncio in the Kingdom of Aragon, in which capacity he successfully sought the derogation of a pragmatic sanction that endangered the freedom of the church. In July and August 1464, he accompanied the pope to Ancona.

Following the death of Pope Pius II, he returned to Rome for the papal conclave of 1464 that elected Pope Paul II. During that conclave, the College of Cardinals had agreed that the number of cardinals should be fixed at 24; Archbishop Nardini and Teodoro Lelio, Bishop of Treviso, advised the new pope in September 1464 not to agree to this limitation. Paul II named Nardini nuncio extraordinary to the Kingdom of Naples. From April 1467 to June 1468, he resided in Paris as papal legate to the Kingdom of France. He was present in Rome when Paul II died in July 1471 and the College of Cardinals named him temporary governor of Rome. In the papal conclave of 1471, the College of Cardinals elected Pope Sixtus IV as the new pope.

In the consistory of 7 May 1473, Sixtus IV made Nardini a cardinal priest; he received the red hat and the titulus of Sant'Adriano al Foro (a deaconry elevated pro illa vice to titulus).

As cardinal, he built the Palazzo Nardini on the Via del Governo Vecchio, next to the Palazzo Taverna. On 10 June 1476 he accompanied the pope to Viterbo, and later to Foligno, because of an outbreak of bubonic plague in Rome. In 1476, he opted for the titulus of Santa Maria in Trastevere. He was Camerlengo of the Sacred College of Cardinals from 8 January 1481 until 7 January 1482. In 1483, he founded the Collegio Nardini.

He participated in the papal conclave of 1484 that elected Pope Innocent VIII. The new pope named him legate to Avignon, but he died before he could perform his legation.

He died in Rome on 22 October 1484. He is buried in St. Peter's Basilica.

Catholic Church titles
Preceded by Giovanni Battista Zeno	Camerlengo of the Sacred College of Cardinals; 1481	Succeeded by Ausiàs Despuig
