= Gabriele Rangone =

Cardinal of the Catholic Church, Bishop of Eger

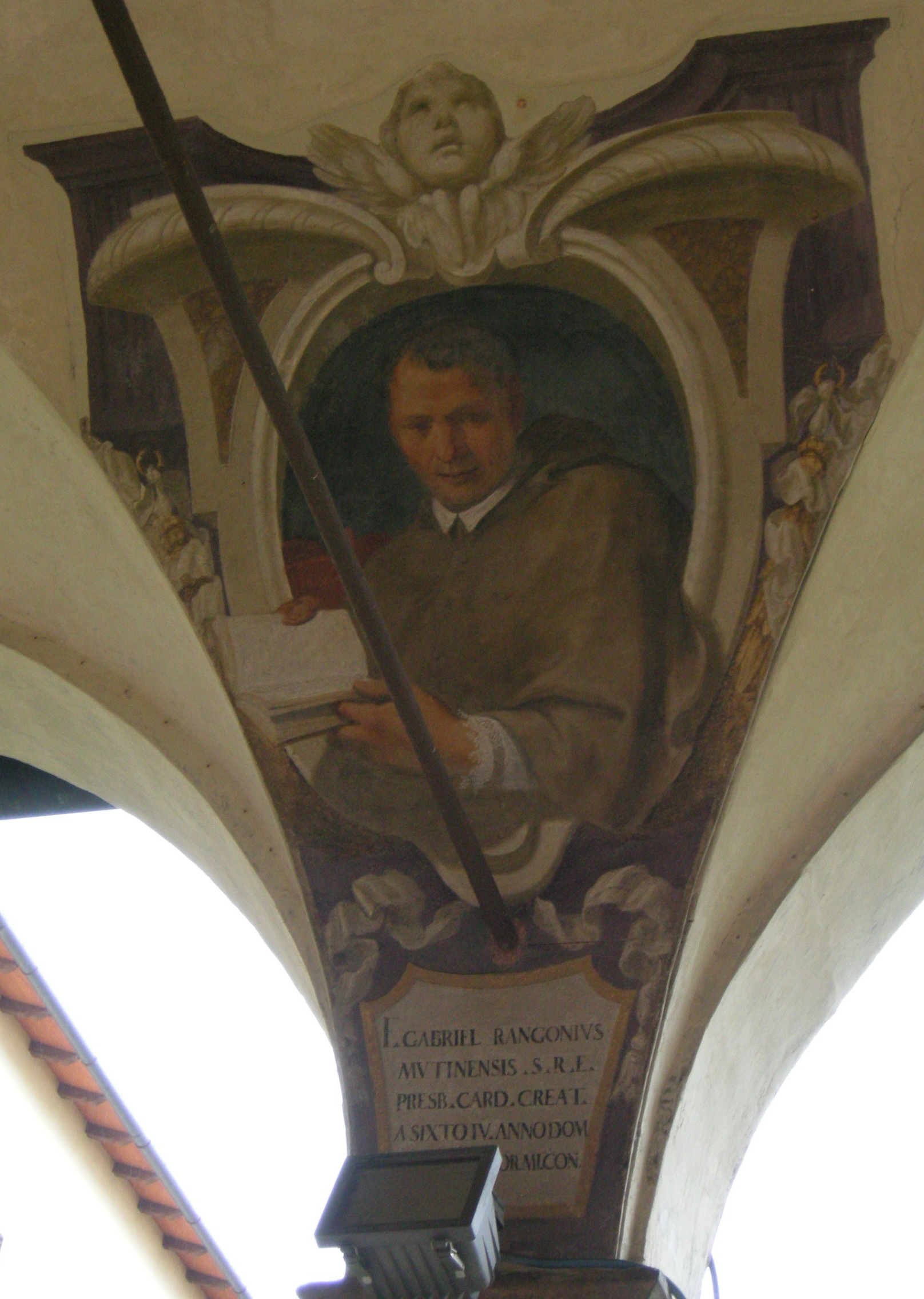
Gabriele Rangone

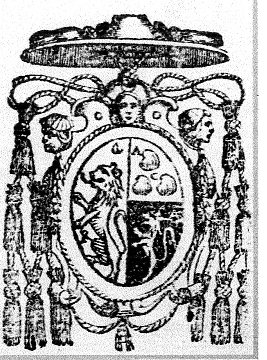
Coat of arms of Cardinal Gabriele Rangone.

Gabriele Rangone (of Verona) O.Min.Obs. (also Rangoni, died 27 September 1486) was a Cardinal of the Catholic Church. He was bishop of Eger lat. Agria.

He was made a cardinal on 10 December 1477 by Pope Sixtus IV. Francesco Gandini cites his birth in Chiari, Lombardy.
