= Giovanni Arcimboldi =

Italian Roman Catholic bishop and cardinal

His Eminence Giovanni Arcimboldi
- Cardinal Archbishop of Milan
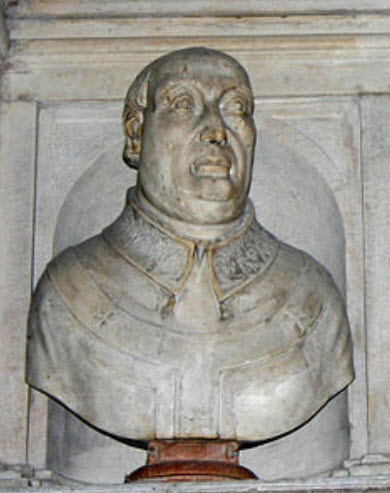
- Bust of Cardinal Arcimboldi in Milan Cathedral
- Church: Catholic Church
- Diocese: Archdiocese of Milan
- Previous post: Bishop of Novara

Personal details
- Born: 1426
- Died: 2 October 1488 (aged 61–62)

Coat of arms of Cardinal Giovanni Arcimboldi

Giovanni Arcimboldi (1426–1488) was an Italian cardinal of the Roman Catholic Church, who became Cardinal Archbishop of Milan in 1485. He was a senator of Milan, and he was Milan's ambassador to Rome. In 1468, he became Bishop of Novara. In 1473, he became a cardinal, and in 1485, he became Archbishop of Milan. On his death, his brother Guido Antonio Arcimboldi succeeded him as Archbishop of Milan (1489–1497), and his grandson Giovanni Angelo Arcimboldi also became Archbishop of Milan (1550–1550).

== Biography ==
Giovanni Arcimboldi was born in Parma in 1430. He was the son of Nicolò Arcimboldo, who was the treasurer of the Duchy of Milan, and his wife Orsina Canossa (descendant of the family of Empress Matilde di Canossa).

He was educated at the University of Pavia, receiving a doctorate of both laws in 1458. He also studied letters under Italian Renaissance humanist Francesco Filelfo and later maintained a correspondence with Filelfo.

Early in his life, he married Briseide Pietrasanta, and had a daughter, Briseide Arcimboldi. He also later fathered nine illegitimate children.

In July 1458, through the influence of Francesco I Sforza, he gained admission to Milan's prestigious Collegio di Giureconsulti. He afterwards became a Senator of the Duchy of Milan.Francesco I Sforza sent Arcimboldi to Rome as his ambassador to the Holy See.

After the death of his wife, Arcimboldi entered the ecclesiastical state. He received the four minor orders in September 1461. On September 20, 1466, he was ordained as a subdeacon by the suffragan bishop of Milan. In October 1466, Pope Paul II made him a protonotary apostolic. He also became a canon of Pavia Cathedral and Piacenza Cathedral at this time.

On 20 November 1468, he was elected Bishop of Novara. He took possession of the see in May 1469, but stayed there only a few days before he was called away by Galeazzo Maria Sforza to serve as his ambassador to Pope Sixtus IV, a post he held from May 1472 until February 1473.

In the consistory of 7 May 1473, Pope Sixtus IV made Arcimboldi a cardinal priest. He received the titular church of Santi Nereo e Achilleo on 17 May 1473. He entered Rome on 24 November 1473 and received the red hat on 10 December 1473. The pope then named him Prefect of the Apostolic Signatura, an office he held until his death. On 31 May 1476, he was elected temporary Camerlengo of the Sacred College of Cardinals in the absence of Cardinal Jacopo Piccolomini-Ammannati. He opted for the titular church of Santa Prassede on 30 December 1476.

On 15 January 1477, Pope Sixtus IV named him legate a latere to Perugia. On 7 February 1477, his legation was extended to include the Kingdom of Hungary, the Holy Roman Empire, and the Kingdom of Bohemia.

During the outbreak of bubonic plague, he again served as temporary Camerlengo of the Sacred College of Cardinals, from 19 May to 5 June 1482. He was then elected to a full term as Camerlengo of the Sacred College of Cardinals on 15 January 1483 and held this post until 19 January 1484. On 15 November 1483, Pope Sixtus IV named him legate to Perugia for a second time.

Following the death of Sixtus IV, Cardinal Arcimboldi participated in the papal conclave of 1484 that elected Pope Innocent VIII. In the consistory of 23 September 1484, Innocent VIII confirmed Arcimboldi's appointment as legate to Perugia, and Arcimboldi left on his legation on 11 October 1484, returning to Rome on 15 January 1485.

Meanwhile, on 25 October 1484, he had been transferred to the metropolitan see of Milan. He received the pallium on 12 November and took formal possession of the archdiocese via a procurator, Antonio Griffi, on 1 January 1485.

He died in Rome on 2 October 1488. He was buried in the Basilica di Sant'Agostino.

Catholic Church titles
Preceded by Ausiàs Despuig	Camerlengo of the Sacred College of Cardinals; 1483	Succeeded by Giovanni Battista Cibo
Preceded by Bernardus de Rubeis	Bishop of Novara; 1457–1466	Succeeded by Ascanio Maria Sforza
Preceded by István Várdai	Cardinal-Priest of Santi Nereo ed Achilleo; 1473–1476	Succeeded by Giovanni Battista Mellini
Preceded by Alain de Coëtivy	Cardinal-Priest of Santa Prassede; 1476–1483	Succeeded by Antonio Pallavicini Gentili
Preceded by Francesco Gonzaga	Cardinal-Priest of Santa Maria Nuova; 1483–1488	Succeeded by Giovanni Battista Orsini
Preceded by Aicardo Antimiano	Archbishop of Milan; 1457–1466	Succeeded by Roberto Visconti
