= Jorge da Costa =

Catholic cardinal (1406–1508)

Jorge da Costa O.Cist.
- Cardinal-Bishop of Porto and Santa Rufina
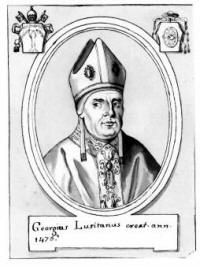
- Church: Catholic Church
- Diocese: Suburbicarian Diocese of Porto and Santa Rufina
- In office: 10 April 1503 – 18 September 1508
- Predecessor: Giovanni Michiel
- Successor: Raffaele Riario
- Other post: Cardinal-Priest of San Lorenzo in Lucina (1489-1508)
- Previous posts: Cardinal-Bishop of Frascati (1501-1503); Cardinal-Bishop of Albano (1491-1501); Archbishop of Lisbon (1464-1500); Cardinal-Priest of Santa Maria in Trastevere (1484-1489); Archbishop of Braga (1486-1488); Cardinal-Priest of Santi Marcellino e Pietro al Laterano (1477-1484); Bishop of Évora (1463-1464)

Orders
- Created cardinal: 18 December 1476 by Pope Sixtus IV

Personal details
- Born: Jorge Martins; 1406 Alpedrinha (in present-day Fundão), Beira, Kingdom of Portugal
- Died: 18 September 1508 (aged 101–102) Rome, Papal States

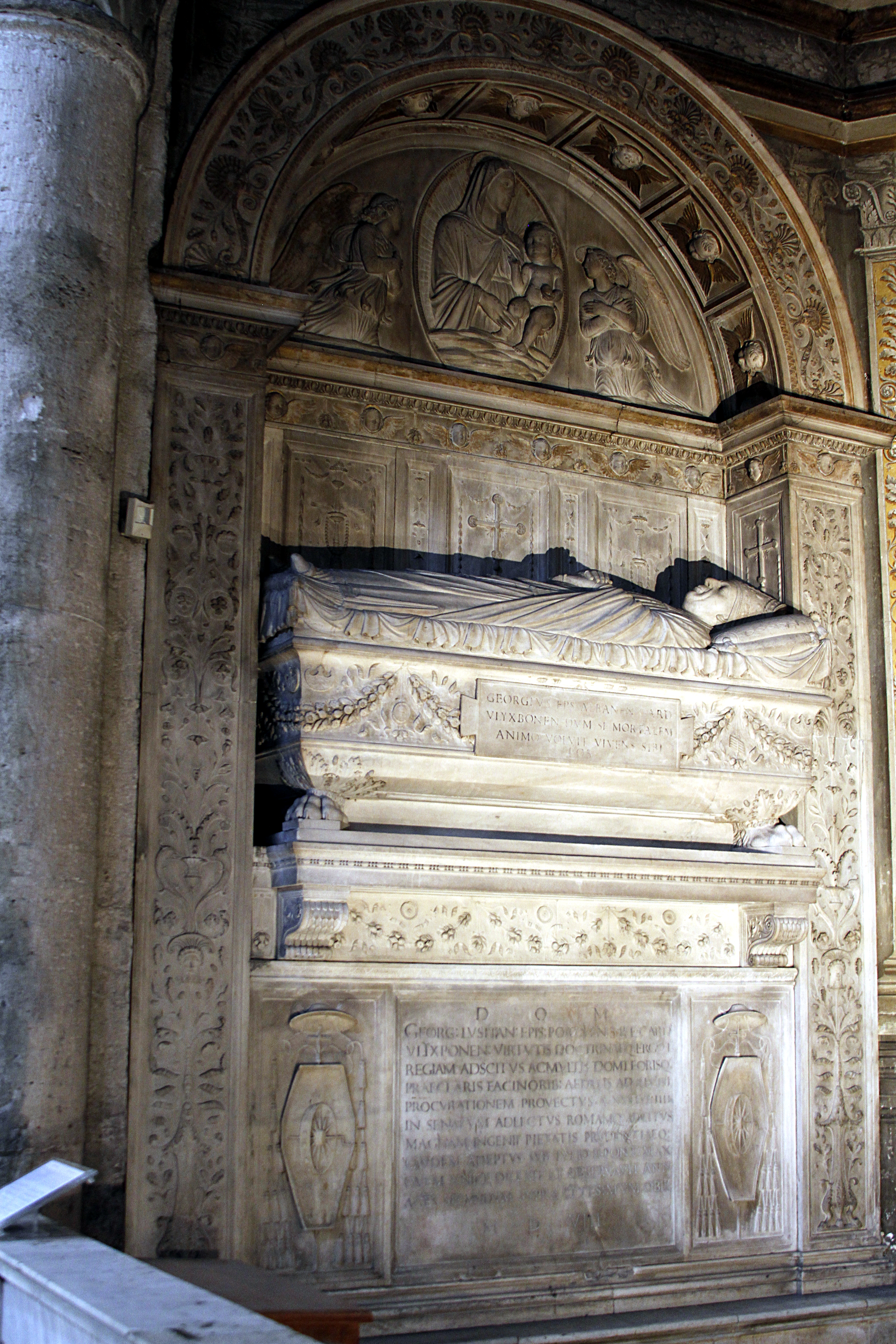
Tomb of Cardinal Jorge da Costa, Santa Maria del Popolo, Rome.

Dom Jorge da Costa (1406 – 18 September 1508) was a Portuguese cardinal.

== Biography ==
Born in Alpedrinha, Fundão, he is often called the Cardinal of Alpedrinha. He was one of many children of Martim Vaz and his wife, Catarina Gonçalves. He made benefits for all his brothers and sisters.

He held a very large number of ecclesiastical offices. He was Archbishop of Lisbon 1464–1500 and 108th Archbishop of Braga 1486–1501.

He was the confessor of Afonso V of Portugal. From 1478 he was in exile in Rome, having clashed with John II of Portugal, at that point in power though not yet reigning. He died a centenarian in Rome. He is buried in the church of Santa Maria del Popolo in the Costa Chapel that he purchased in 1488 and furnished with high-quality works of art.

He died on 18 September 1508, aged between 101 and 102, making him the second longest lived cardinal after Cardinal Bafile, who died on 3 February 2005 at the age of 101 years, 214 days.

Catholic Church titles
Preceded by Giovanni Michiel	Camerlengo of the Sacred College of Cardinals; 1486	Succeeded by Unknown
