= Pope Sixtus IV =

Head of the Catholic Church from 1471 to 1484

- Bishop of Rome
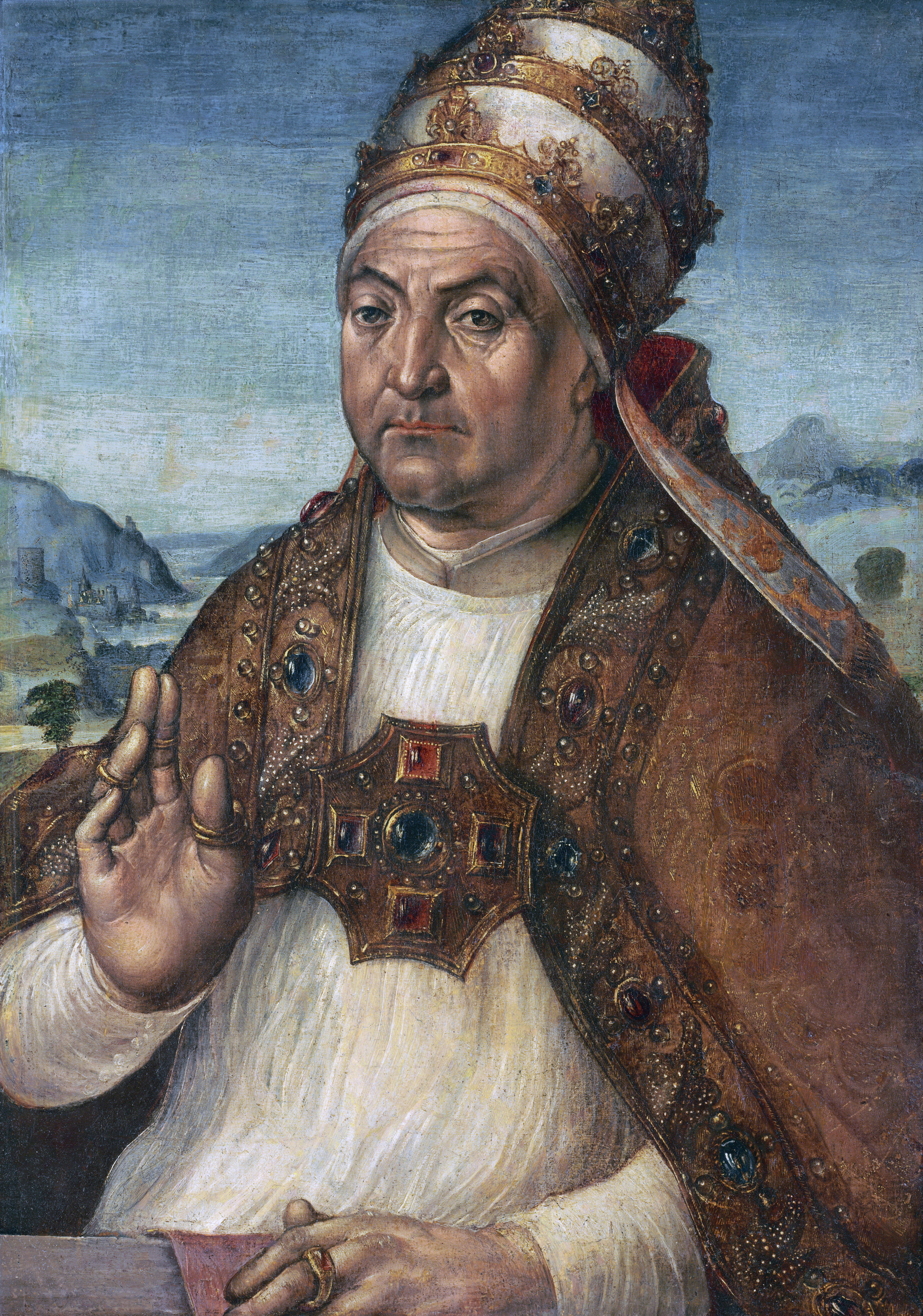
- Portrait by Pedro Berruguete, c. 1476–1482
- Church: Catholic Church
- Papacy began: 9 August 1471
- Papacy ended: 12 August 1484
- Predecessor: Paul II
- Successor: Innocent VIII
- Previous posts: Minister General of the Order of Friars Minor (1464–1469); Cardinal-Priest of San Pietro in Vincoli (1467–1471)

Orders
- Consecration: 25 August 1471 by Guillaume d'Estouteville
- Created cardinal: 18 September 1467 by Paul II

Personal details
- Born: Francesco della Rovere; 21 July 1414 Celle Ligure, Republic of Genoa
- Died: 12 August 1484 (aged 70) Rome, Papal States
- Signature: Sixtus IV's signature

- Coat of arms: Sixtus IV's coat of arms

Papal styles of Pope Sixtus IV
- Reference style: His Holiness
- Spoken style: Your Holiness
- Religious style: Holy Father
- Posthumous style: None

Ordination history of Pope Sixtus IV
History
Episcopal consecration
- Consecrated by: Guillaume d'Estouteville
- Date: 25 August 1471
Cardinalate
- Elevated by: Pope Paul II
- Date: 18 September 1467 in pectore (revealed 19 September 1467)
Episcopal succession
Bishops consecrated by Pope Sixtus IV as principal consecrator
- Pierre Engelpert: 25 March 1477
- Georg Hessler: 13 February 1480
- Giuliano della Rovere: 1481
- Matthias Scheit: 31 December 1481

Pope Sixtus IV (or Xystus IV, Italian: Sisto IV; born Francesco da Savona later della Rovere; 21 July 1414 – 12 August 1484) was head of the Catholic Church and leader of the Papal States from 9 August 1471 until his death in 1484.

Sixtus IV's accomplishments as pope included the construction of the Sistine Chapel and the creation of the Vatican Library. A patron of the arts, he brought together the group of artists who ushered the early Renaissance into Rome with the first masterpieces of the city's new artistic age.

Sixtus created the Spanish Inquisition through the Papal bull Exigit Sinceræ Devotionis (1478), and annulled the Pontifical decrees of the Council of Constance. He was noted for his nepotism and was personally involved in the Pazzi conspiracy, a plot to remove the Medici family from power in Florence. He died in August 1484 at the age of 70.

== Early life ==
Francesco was a member of the della Rovere family, a son of Leonardo Beltramo di Savona della Rovere and Luchina Monteleoni. He was born in Celle Ligure, a town near Savona.

Mandell Creighton says that Francesco was born of such lowly origin that he lacked a surname and took his from the della Rovere di Vinovo family of Turin when he went there to tutor them. Egmont Lee instead writes that "Leonardo was one of the anziani of Savona in 1413, 1425, and 1427, and had participated in an embassy to Filippo Maria Visconti. Pompeo Litta agrees with Creighton that Francesco took the della Rovere Surname from the della Rovere di Vinovo because he asserts that the Leonardo who was one of the anziani of Savona had also been part of the delegation in 1391 to swear allegiance to the Genovese and Leondardo, father of Francesco, must have been two different people, and that Leonardo "della Rovere" was most likely a poorcloth shearer (cimatore di panni).

At the age of 9, Francesco joined the Franciscan Order under Minorite Giovanni de Pinerolo, an unlikely choice for a political career, and his intellectual qualities were revealed while he was studying philosophy and theology at the University of Bologna, and later University of Padua where he received his licentiate on January 19th, 1434 and his doctorate in 1444. He went on to lecture at Padua and many other Italian universities.

In 1446, Francesco was called to be assistant to the minister General of the Fransican order, Antonio Rusconi, and his successor, Angelo Cristoforo del Toscano, who relied on him extensively. By 1459, Cardinal Bessarion had made Francesco della Rovere his personal confessor, holding him in high regard as to describe him in a letter of introduction on June 18, 1459 to Francesco Sforza as "Uno de li primi e piu reputati del suo ordine". In 1464, della Rovere was elected Minister General of the Franciscan order at the age of 50. In 1467, he was appointed Cardinal by Pope Paul II with the titular church being the Basilica of San Pietro in Vincoli.

Before his papal election, Cardinal della Rovere was renowned for his unworldliness and had written learned treatises, including On the Blood of Christ and On the Power of God.

His reputation for piety was one of the deciding factors that prompted the College of Cardinals to elect him Pope upon the unexpected death of Paul II at the age of fifty-four.

== Papacy ==
Upon being elected Pope, Della Rovere adopted the name Sixtus, which had not been used since the 5th century. One of his first acts was to declare a renewed crusade against the Ottoman Turks in Smyrna. However, after the conquest of Smyrna, the fleet disbanded. Some fruitless attempts were made towards unification with the Greek Church. For the remainder of his pontificate, Sixtus turned to temporal issues and dynastic considerations.

=== Nepotism ===
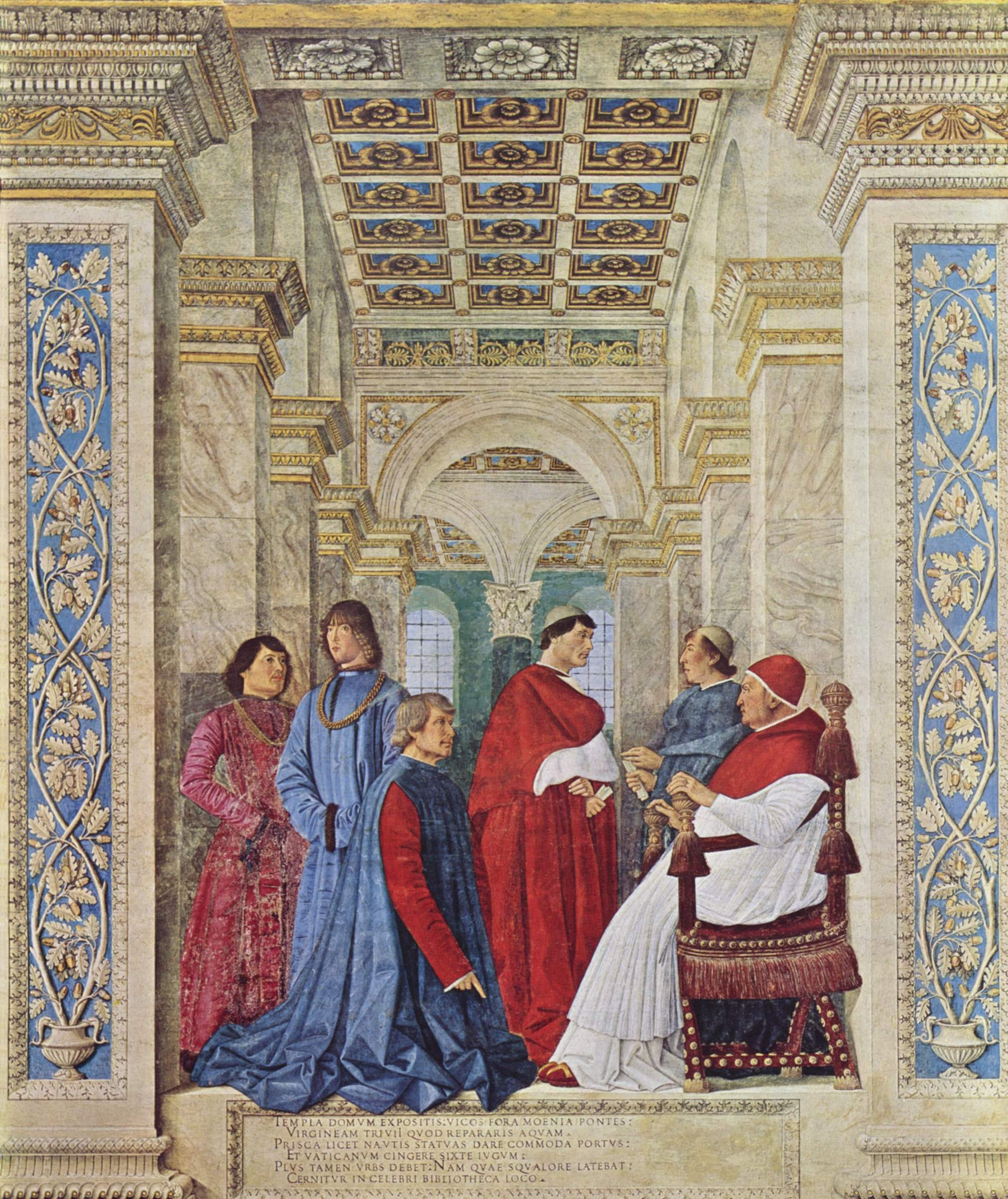
Pope Sixtus IV appoints Platina as Prefect of the Library, by Melozzo da Forlì, accompanied by his relatives

Sixtus IV sought to strengthen his position by surrounding himself with relatives and friends. In the fresco by Melozzo da Forlì, he is accompanied by his Della Rovere and Riario nephews, not all of whom were made cardinals; the protonotary apostolic Pietro Riario (on his right), the future Pope Julius II / Giuliano Della Rovere standing before him; and Girolamo Riario and Giovanni della Rovere, behind the kneeling Platina, author of the first humanist history of the popes.

His nephew, Pietro Riario, possibly also benefited from his alleged nepotism. He was successively promoted to be a cardinal, the bishop of Florence, the Patriarch of Constantinople and given some 45 additional benefices. Pietro became one of the richest men in Rome and was entrusted with Pope Sixtus IV's foreign policy, in addition to being given an unofficial post as the de facto ruler of Rome. He reportedly spent 200,000 gold ducats on foodstuffs and festivities during two years in office. Pietro died prematurely in 1474. Chroniclers of his life seem to regard his death as unnatural and thus connect his alleged grandiose spending habits and the impression they left on his contemporaries as causal.

Criticisms of Pietro's meteoric rise were not constrained to the charge of benefiting from nepotism as Sixtus IV's nephew, nor to allegations of possibly having been Sixtus IV's illegitimate son. Indeed, Pietro and his brother Girolamo Riario were alleged to have been lovers of Sixtus IV in polemics against the latter. According to the later published chronicle of the Italian historian Stefano Infessura, Diary of the City of Rome, Sixtus was a "lover of boys and a sodomite" (Latin: puerorum amator et sodomita) awarding benefices and bishoprics in return for sexual favours and nominating a number of young men as cardinals. Sexualized polemics, in truth concerned with politics and not the sexual lives of their victims, were not uncommon during this time; but as Pfisterer (sic) notes "the novel flood of accusations of sodomy against a pope" and "true flood of corresponding lampoons, reviling poems, and fictional epitaphs" following his death are at the very least evidence for his contemporaries' opinions about the promotions of these young men.

The secular fortunes of the Della Rovere family began when Sixtus invested his nephew Giovanni with the lordship of Senigallia and arranged his marriage to the daughter of Federico III da Montefeltro, duke of Urbino; from that union came a line of Della Rovere dukes of Urbino that lasted until the line expired, in 1631. Six of the thirty-four cardinals that he created were his nephews.

In his territorial aggrandizement of the Papal States, his niece's son, Cardinal Raffaele Riario (for whom the Palazzo della Cancelleria was constructed) was suspected of colluding in the failed Pazzi conspiracy of 1478 to assassinate both Lorenzo de' Medici and his brother Giuliano and replace them in Florence with Sixtus IV's other nephew, Girolamo Riario. Francesco Salviati, Archbishop of Pisa and a main organizer of the plot, was hung on the walls of the Florentine Palazzo della Signoria. Sixtus IV replied with an interdict and two years of war with Florence. Sixtus IV himself was personally involved, though he disingenuously claimed that he did not want bloodshed.

However, Infessura had partisan allegiances to the Colonna and so is not considered to be always reliable or impartial. The English churchman and Protestant polemicist John Bale, writing a century later, attributed to Sixtus "the authorisation to practice sodomy during periods of warm weather" to the "Cardinal of Santa Lucia". This prompted the noted historian of the Catholic Church, Ludwig von Pastor, to issue a firm rebuttal.

=== Foreign policy ===
Sixtus continued a dispute with King Louis XI of France, who upheld the Pragmatic Sanction of Bourges (1438), which held that papal decrees needed royal assent before they could be promulgated in France. That was a cornerstone of the privileges claimed for the Gallican Church and could never be shifted as long as Louis XI manoeuvred to replace King Ferdinand I of Naples with a French prince. Louis was thus in conflict with the papacy, and Sixtus could not permit it.

On 1 November 1478, Sixtus published the papal bull Exigit Sincerae Devotionis Affectus through which the Spanish Inquisition was established in the Kingdom of Castile. Sixtus consented under political pressure from Ferdinand of Aragon, who threatened to withhold military support from his kingdom of Sicily. Nevertheless, Sixtus IV quarrelled over protocol and prerogatives of jurisdiction; he was unhappy with the excesses of the Inquisition and condemned the most flagrant abuses in 1482.

As a temporal prince who constructed stout fortresses in the Papal States, he encouraged the Venetians to attack Ferrara, which he wished to obtain for another nephew. Ercole I d'Este, Duke of Ferrara, was allied with the Sforzas of Milan, the Medicis of Florence along with the King of Naples, normally a hereditary ally and champion of the papacy. The angered Italian princes allied to force Sixtus IV to make peace to his great annoyance.

For refusing to desist from the very hostilities that he himself had instigated and for being a dangerous rival to Della Rovere dynastic ambitions in the Marche, Sixtus placed Venice under interdict in 1483. He also lined the coffers of the state by unscrupulously selling high offices and privileges.

In ecclesiastical affairs, Sixtus promoted the dogma of the Immaculate Conception, which had been confirmed at the Council of Basel in 1439, and he designated 8 December as its feastday. In 1476, he issued the apostolic constitution Cum Praeexcelsa, establishing a Mass and Office for the feast. He formally annulled the decrees of the Council of Constance in 1478.

=== Slavery ===
The two papal bulls issued by Pope Nicholas V, Dum Diversas of 1452 and Romanus Pontifex of 1455, had effectively given the Portuguese the rights to acquire non-Christian slaves along the African Coast by force or trade. Those concessions were confirmed by Sixtus in his own bull, Aeterni regis, of 21 June 1481. Arguably the "ideology of conquest" expounded in those texts became the means by which commerce and conversion were facilitated.

In November 1476, Isabel and Fernando ordered an investigation into rights of conquest in the Canary Islands, and in the spring of 1478, they sent Juan Rejon with sixty soldiers and thirty cavalry to the Grand Canary, where the natives retreated inland. Sixtus's earlier threats to excommunicate all captains or pirates who enslaved Christians in the bull Regimini Gregis of 1476 could have been intended to emphasise the need to convert the natives of the Canary Islands and Guinea and establish a clear difference in status between those who had converted and those who resisted. The ecclesiastical penalties were directed towards those who were enslaving the recent converts.

=== Princely patronage ===
As a civic patron in Rome, even the anti-papal chronicler Stefano Infessura agreed that Sixtus should be admired. The dedicatory inscription in the fresco by Melozzo da Forlì in the Vatican Palace records: "You gave your city temples, streets, squares, fortifications, bridges and restored the Acqua Vergine as far as the Trevi..."

In addition to restoring the aqueduct that provided Rome an alternative to the river water, which had made the city famously unhealthy, he restored or rebuilt over 30 of Rome's dilapidated churches such as San Vitale (1475) and Santa Maria del Popolo, and he added seven new ones. The Sistine Chapel was sponsored by Sixtus IV, as was the Ponte Sisto, the Sistine Bridge (the first new bridge across the Tiber since Antiquity), and the building of Via Sistina (later named Borgo Sant'Angelo), a road leading from Castel Sant'Angelo to Saint Peter.

All of that was done to facilitate the integration of the Vatican Hill and Borgo with the heart of Old Rome. That was part of a broader scheme of urbanization carried out under Sixtus IV, who swept the long-established markets from the Campidoglio in 1477 and decreed in a bull of 1480 the widening of streets and the first post-Roman paving, the removal of porticoes and other post-classical impediments to free public passage.

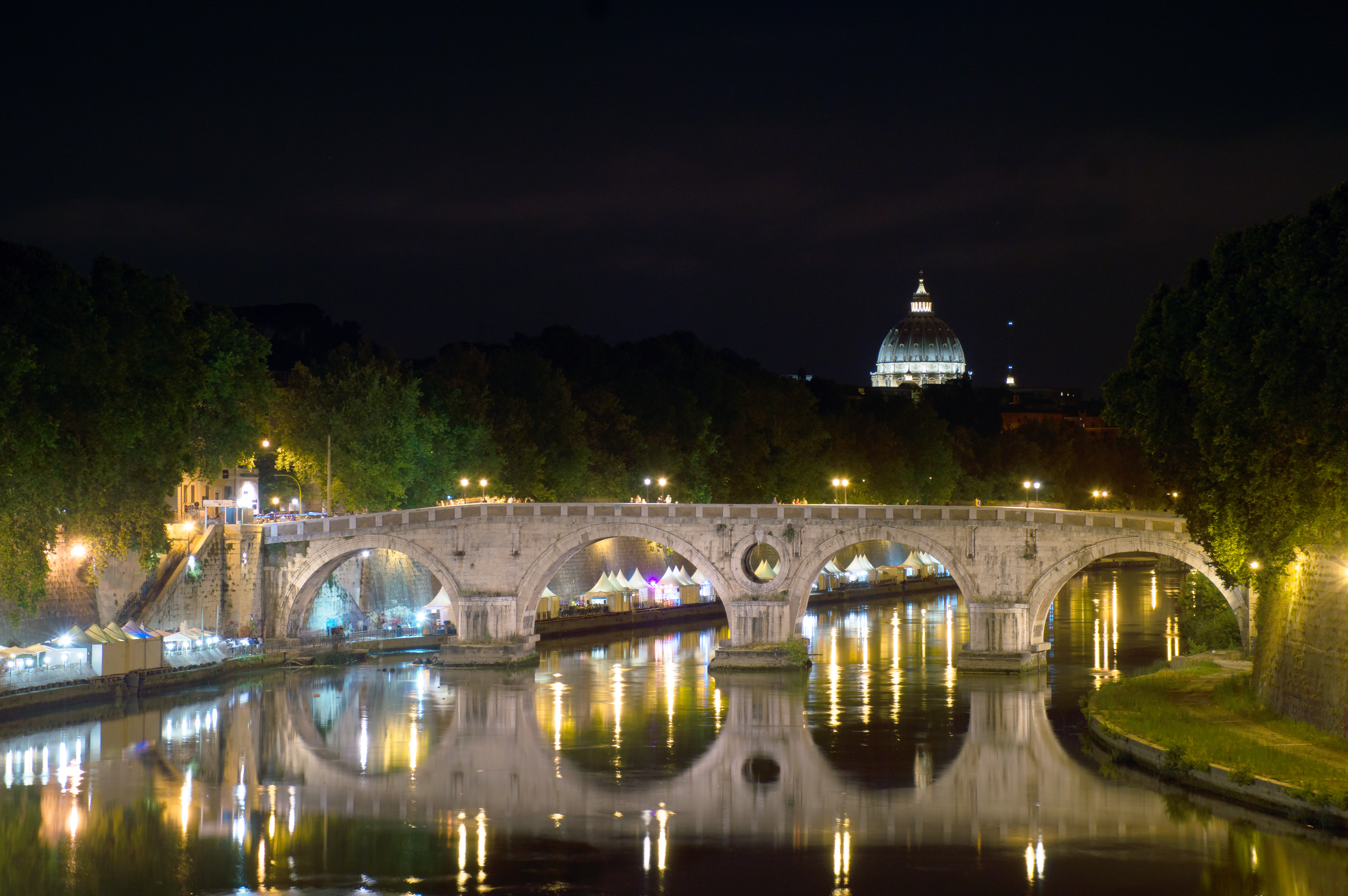
Ponte Sisto, the first bridge built at Rome since the Roman Empire

At the beginning of his papacy, in 1471, Sixtus had donated several historically important Roman sculptures that founded a papal collection of art, which would eventually develop into the collections of the Capitoline Museums. He also refounded, enriched and enlarged the Vatican Library. He had Regiomontanus attempt the first sanctioned reorganisation of the Julian calendar and increased the size and prestige of the papal chapel choir, bringing singers and some prominent composers (Gaspar van Weerbeke, Marbrianus de Orto and Bertrandus Vaqueras) to Rome from the north.

In addition to being a patron of the arts, Sixtus was a patron of the sciences. Before he became pope, he had spent time at the very liberal and cosmopolitan University of Padua, which maintained considerable independence from the Church and had a very international character.

As Pope, he issued a papal bull allowing local bishops to give the bodies of executed criminals and unidentified corpses to physicians and artists for dissection. It was that access to corpses which allowed the anatomist Vesalius, along with Titian's pupil Jan Stephen van Calcar, to complete the revolutionary medical/anatomical text De humani corporis fabrica.

=== Other activities ===
==== Consistories ====
The Pope created 34 cardinals in eight consistories held during his reign, among them three nephews, one grandnephew and one other relative, thus continuing the practice of nepotism that he and his successors would engage in during this period.

==== Canonizations and beatifications ====
Sixtus IV named seven new saints, with the most notable being Bonaventure (1482); he also beatified one person, John Buoni (1483).

==== Uppsala University ====
In 1477, Sixtus IV issued a papal bull authorizing the creation of Uppsala University – the first university in Sweden and in the whole of Scandinavia. The choice of this location for the university derived from the fact that the archbishopric of Uppsala had been one of the most important sees in Sweden proper since Christianity first spread to this region in the ninth century, as well as Uppsala being long-standing hub for regional trade. Uppsala's bull, which granted the university its corporate rights, established a number of provisions. Among the most important of these was that the university was officially given the same freedoms and privileges as the University of Bologna. This included the right to establish the four traditional faculties of theology, law (Canon Law and Roman law), medicine, and philosophy, and to award the bachelor's, master's, licentiate, and doctoral degrees. The archbishop of Uppsala was also named as the university's Chancellor, and was charged with maintaining the rights and privileges of the university and its members. This act of Sixtus IV had a profound long-term effect on the society and culture of Sweden, an effect which continues up to the present.

== Death ==
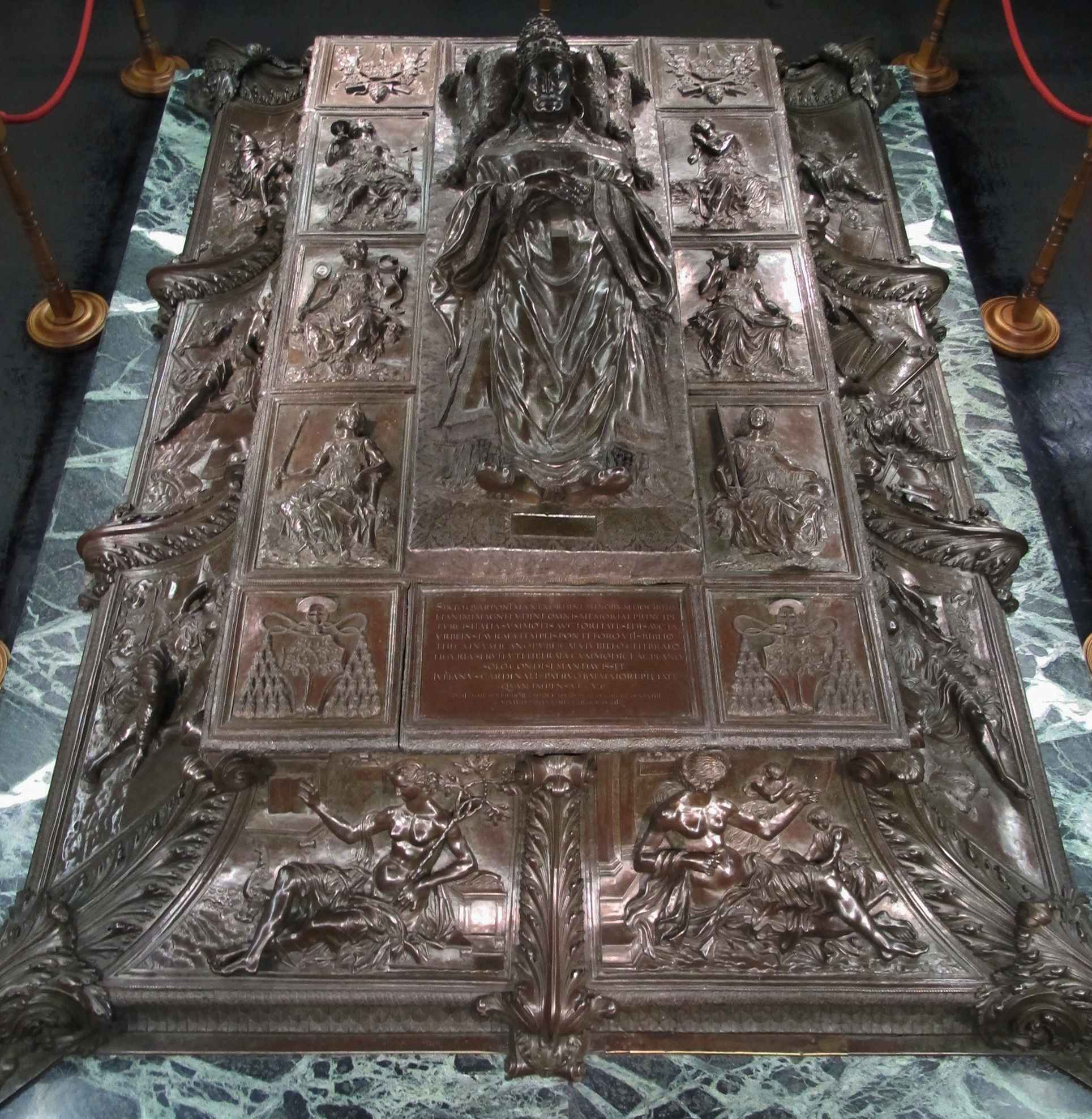
Tomb monument, by Antonio del Pollaiuolo

Sixtus IV became ill on 8 August 1484; this illness worsened on 10 August while the pope was attending an event in Rome. He felt unwell that evening and was forced to cancel a meeting he was to hold with his cardinals the following morning. The Pope grew weaker during the night of 11 August and he was unable to sleep. Sixtus IV died the following evening – 12 August.

The envoy of the Medici family summed up Sixtus' reign in the announcement to his master, "Today at 5 o'clock His Holiness Sixtus IV departed this life – may God forgive him!"

Pope Sixtus's tomb was destroyed in the Sack of Rome in 1527. Today, his remains, along with the remains of his nephew Pope Julius II (Giuliano della Rovere), are interred in St. Peter's Basilica, in the floor in front of the monument to Pope Clement X. A marble tombstone marks the site.

His bronze funerary monument, now in the basement Treasury of St. Peter's Basilica, made like a giant casket of goldsmith's work, is by Antonio del Pollaiuolo; it was completed by 1493. The top of the casket is a lifelike depiction of the Pope lying in state. Around the sides are bas-relief panels depicting allegorical female figures representing Grammar, Rhetoric, Arithmetic, Geometry, Music, Painting, Astronomy, Philosophy, and Theology—the classical liberal arts, with the addition of painting and theology. Each figure incorporates the oak tree ("rovere" in Italian), symbol of Sixtus IV. The overall program of the panels, their beauty, complex symbolism, classical references and their relative arrangement are compelling and comprehensive illustrations of the Renaissance worldview. None of them actually states how he died.

== Cardinals ==
Sixtus created an unusually large number of cardinals during his pontificate (23) who were drawn from the roster of the princely houses of Italy, France and Spain, thus ensuring that many of his policies continued after his death:

- Giuliano della Rovere (later Pope Julius II)
- Stefano Nardini
- Pedro González de Mendoza
- Giovanni Battista Cybo (later Pope Innocent VIII)
- Giovanni Arcimboldi
- Philibert Hugonet
- Jorge da Costa
- Charles de Bourbon
- Pierre de Foix le jeune
- Girolamo Basso della Rovere
- Gabriele Rangone
- Pietro Foscari
- Joan Margarit i Pau
- Raffaele Sansoni Riario
- Domenico della Rovere
- Paolo Fregoso
- Jorge Bardina
- Giovanni Battista Savelli
- Giovanni Colonna
- Giovanni Conti
- Juan Moles de Margarit
- Giovanni Giacomo Sclafenati
- Giovanni Battista Orsini
- Ascanio Maria Sforza-Visconti

== Portrayals ==
Pope Sixtus is portrayed by Raoul Bova in the second season, and John Lynch in the third season of the TV series Medici: Masters of Florence.

Pope Sixtus is also portrayed by James Faulkner in all three seasons of the Starz TV series Da Vinci's Demons.

== Notes ==
Catholic Church titles
Preceded by Paul II	Pope; 9 August 1471 – 12 August 1484	Succeeded by Innocent VIII
