= Archibald (name) =

Origin
- Meaning: Derives from the Old High German Erkanbald, composed of erkan, "precious" and bald, "strong".

Other names
- Variant forms: Arcimboldi; Archambeault; Archambault

Archibald is a family name and a given name, deriving from Old High German Erkanbald, composed of erkan, "precious" and bald, "strong". The name varies in Old French as Archambeault and Archambault, and in Italian as Arcimboldi.

== Surname ==
=== People ===
- Adam Archibald (1879–1957), Scottish Victoria Cross recipient
- Adams George Archibald (1814–1892), Canadian politician
- Adrian Archibald (born 1969), Irish motorcycle racer
- Alan Archibald (born 1977), Scottish football coach
- Alexander Lackie Archibald (1788–1859), Canadian politician
- Anna Archibald (born 1959), New Zealander Olympic skier
- Ben Archibald (born 1978), American National Football League player
- Bobby Archibald (1894–1966), Scottish footballer
- Charles Dickson Archibald (1802–1868), Canadian politician
- Cyril Archibald (1837–1914), Canadian politician
- Dave Archibald (born 1969), Canadian hockey player
- David Archibald (politician) (1717–1795), Canadian politician
- Donald Archibald (1840–1908), Canadian politician
- Edward Archibald (athlete) (1884–1965), Canadian pole vaulter
- Edgar Archibald (1885–1968), Canadian agricultural scientist
- Edith Archibald (1854–1936), Canadian suffragist and union leader
- Edward Mortimer Archibald (1810–1884), Canadian politician
- Frank Archibald (1885–1975), Aboriginal Australian elder – see Frank Archibald Memorial Lecture Series
- Frank C. Archibald (Newfoundland politician) (1887–1972), Canadian politician
- George Archibald (disambiguation)
- Harry Archibald (1910–1965), Canadian politician
- James Archibald (1912–2006), American judge
- Jane Archibald, Canadian operatic soprano
- Jeff Archibald (born 1952), New Zealand field hockey player
- Jimmy Archibald (1892–1975), Scottish association footballer
- Joan Archibald (1913–2002), Canadian Olympic fencer
- Joey Archibald (1914–1998), American boxer
- Joseph Archibald (died 2014), British Virgin Islands Attorney General and judge
- Josh Archibald (born 1992), Canadian ice hockey player
- Jim Archibald (born 1961), Canadian ice hockey player
- Jules J. F. Archibald (1856–1919), Australian journalist and publisher
- Liliana Archibald (1928–2014), English insurance broker for Lloyd's of London
- Lynn Archibald (1944–1997), American college basketball coach
- Marion Archibald (1936–2016), Scottish numismatist
- Matthew Archibald (1745–1820), Canadian politician
- Nancy Archibald (1911–1996), Canadian Olympic fencer
- Nate Archibald (born 1948), American basketball player
- Nicholas Archibald (born 1975), Scottish cricketer
- Nolan D. Archibald (born 1943), American businessman
- Phyllis Archibald (1880–1947), English sculptor
- Raymond C. Archibald (1875–1955), Canadian-American mathematician and historian of mathematics
- Robert Archibald (1980–2020), Scottish basketball player
- Robin Tenney (born Robin Tenney Archibald 1958), American tennis player
- Samuel Archibald (politician, born 1742) (1742–1780), Canadian politician
- Samuel George William Archibald (1777–1846), Canadian politician and judge, son of the above
- Samuel Archibald (writer) (born 1978), Canadian writer
- Sandy Archibald (1897–1946), Scottish footballer
- Steve Archibald (born 1956), Scottish footballer and manager
- Thomas Dickson Archibald (1813–1890), Canadian politician
- William Archibald (politician) (1850–1926), South Australian politician

=== Fictional characters ===
- Kayneth El-Melloi Archibald, a character in Fate/Zero, a Japanese light novel series
- Nate Archibald (Gossip Girl), a main character on the TV series Gossip Girl

== Given name ==
=== People ===
- Archibald of Douglas (died c. 1238), Scottish knight and Abbot of Dunfermline Abbey
- Archibald (bishop of Moray) (died 1298), Scottish prelate
- Archibald F. Bennett (1896–1965), Latter Day Saints genealogist
- Archibald Butt (1865–1912), American journalist, army officer, presidential adviser and RMS Titanic victim
- Archibald Campbell (disambiguation)
- Archibald Cameron (disambiguation)
- Archibald Cecil Chappelow (1886–1976), British fine art consultant
- Archibald Cox (1912–2004), American lawyer, politician and US Solicitor General
- A. J. Cronin (1896–1981), Scottish author
- Archibald Dickson (died 1803), British Royal Navy admiral
- Archibald Dickson (sea captain) (1892–1939)
- Archibald Dixon (1802–1876), US senator from Kentucky
- Archibald Douglas (disambiguation)
- Archibald Geikie (1835–1924), Scottish geologist
- Archibald Gemmell (1869–1945), Canadian politician
- Archie Gemmill (born 1947), Scottish footballer
- Archibald Grimké (1849–1930), American journalist and diplomat
- Archibald Gracie IV (1859–1912), American writer and RMS Titanic survivor
- Archibald Hall (1924–2002), Scottish serial killer
- Archibald Hamilton (disambiguation)
- Archibald Hill (1886–1977), British physiologist
- Archibald Keightley (1859–1930), English physician and theosophist
- Archibald Lampman (1861–1899), Canadian poet
- Archibald Leach (1904–1986), stage name Cary Grant, American actor
- Archibald Donald Mackenzie (1914–1944), British captain
- Archibald MacLeish (1892–1982), American modernist writer
- Archie Mafeje (1936–2007), South African anthropologist and activist
- Archie Manning (born 1949), former National Football League quarterback, father of Peyton and Eli Manning
- Archibald McBryde (1766–1816), Scottish-born American politician
- Archibald McLean (judge) (1791–1865), Canadian judge
- Archibald McLelan (1824–1890), Canadian shipbuilder and politician
- Archibald Milman (1834–1902), British civil servant
- Archibald Motley (1891–1981), American visual artist
- Archibald Murphey (1777–1832), North Carolina politician
- Archibald Montgomerie (disambiguation)
- Archibald Napier (disambiguation)
- Archibald Primrose (disambiguation)
- Archibald Ritchie (British Army officer) (1869–1955), British Army officer
- Archibald Ritchie (footballer, born 1868) (1868–1932), Scottish footballer
- Archibald Ritchie (footballer, born 1894) (1894–1973), Scottish footballer
- Archibald Alexander Ritchie (1806–1856), American businessman
- Archibald Roosevelt (1894–1979), American army officer, son of Theodore Roosevelt
- Archibald W. Singham (1932–1991), Sri Lankan Tamil political scientist and historian
- A. Loudon Snowden (1835–1912), American diplomat
- Archibald David Stirling (1915–1990), Scottish British Army officer who created the Special Air Service
- Archie Thompson (Australian rules footballer) (1875–1950)
- Archibald W. O. Totten (1809–1867), American judge
- Archibald Wavell, 1st Earl Wavell (1883–1950), British commander
- Archibald Welch (1794–1853), American politician and physician

=== Pseudonym or ring name ===
- Archibald Joyce, pseudonym of Arthur Joyce (1873–1963), British light music composer
- Archibald Peck, 2011 ring name of Robert Evans (wrestler) (born 1983)

=== Fictional characters ===
- Archie Andrews (comics), the namesake character from Archie Comics
- Archibald Asparagus, in the Christian video series VeggieTales
- Archie Bunker, in the sitcom All in the Family
- Archibald Craven, in the novel The Secret Garden and various adaptations
- Archie Goodwin (character), in Rex Stout's detective short stories and novels
- Archibald Grosvenor, in the Gilbert and Sullivan opera Patience
- Captain Haddock, in The Adventures of Tintin
- Archibald Ironfist, the primary antagonist in the computer game Heroes of Might and Magic II as well as a secondary antagonist in Might and Magic VI: The Mandate of Heaven and Might and Magic VII: For Blood and Honor.
- Archibald "Archie" Mitchell, in the television soap opera EastEnders
- Archibald Witwicky, a character from Transformers
- Archie Wong, a character in the television series Waterloo Road
- Archibald Yronwood, a minor character in A Song of Ice and Fire
- the title character of Archibald the Koala, an animated children's television series
- the title character of Archibald le Magi-chien, an animated children's television series

== See also ==
- Arcimboldi
- Archambeault
- Archambault
- Erkanbald
