= Archambault (surname) =

Archambault (French pronunciation: [aʁʃɑ̃bo]) is a surname.

== Notable people with the name ==
- Alexandre Archambault (1829–1879), Canadian politician and lawyer
- Charles Archambault (fl. 1812–1838), Canadian politician and surveyor
- François-Xavier Archambault (1841–1893), Canadian politician and lawyer
- George F. Archambault (1909–2001), American pharmacy liaison officer
- Gilles Archambault (born 1933), Canadian novelist
- Gilles Archambault (Canadian football) (1934–2009), Canadian football player
- Jacques Archambault (c. 1604–1688), French colonist in Montreal
- Jacques Archambault (politician) (1765–1851), Canadian politician
- Jean Archambault (1780–c. 1831), Canadian politician
- Jean-Jacques Archambault (died 2001), Canadian engineer
- JoAllyn Archambault (born 1942), American cultural anthropologist
- John Archambault, American children's book author
- Joseph Archambault (1879–1964), Canadian politician and lawyer
- Joseph-Éloi Archambault (1861–1916), Canadian politician
- Larry Archambault (1919–1981), Canadian ice hockey player
- Lee Archambault (born 1960), American astronaut
- Louis Archambault (1915–2003), Canadian sculptor
- Louise Archambault, Canadian film director and screenwriter
- Louise Archambault Greaves, film director and producer
- Marcos Archambault, Canadian politician
- Maurice Archambault (1914–2002), Canadian judge
- Michel Archambault (1950–2018), Canadian ice hockey left wing
- Nico Archambault (born 1984), Canadian dancer and choreographer
- Pierre Archambault, Canadian judge
- Pierre-Urgel Archambault (1812–1871), Canadian politician
- Stephen Archambault, American politician from Rhode Island
- Sylvain Archambault, Canadian director
- Théophile Archambault (1806–1863), French psychiatrist
- Timothy Archambault (born 1971), Native American flautist, architect, and composer
- Yves Archambault (born 1952), Canadian ice hockey goaltender

== See also ==
- Archambeault, surname
- Archambault (disambiguation)
