= Bicocca degli Arcimboldi =

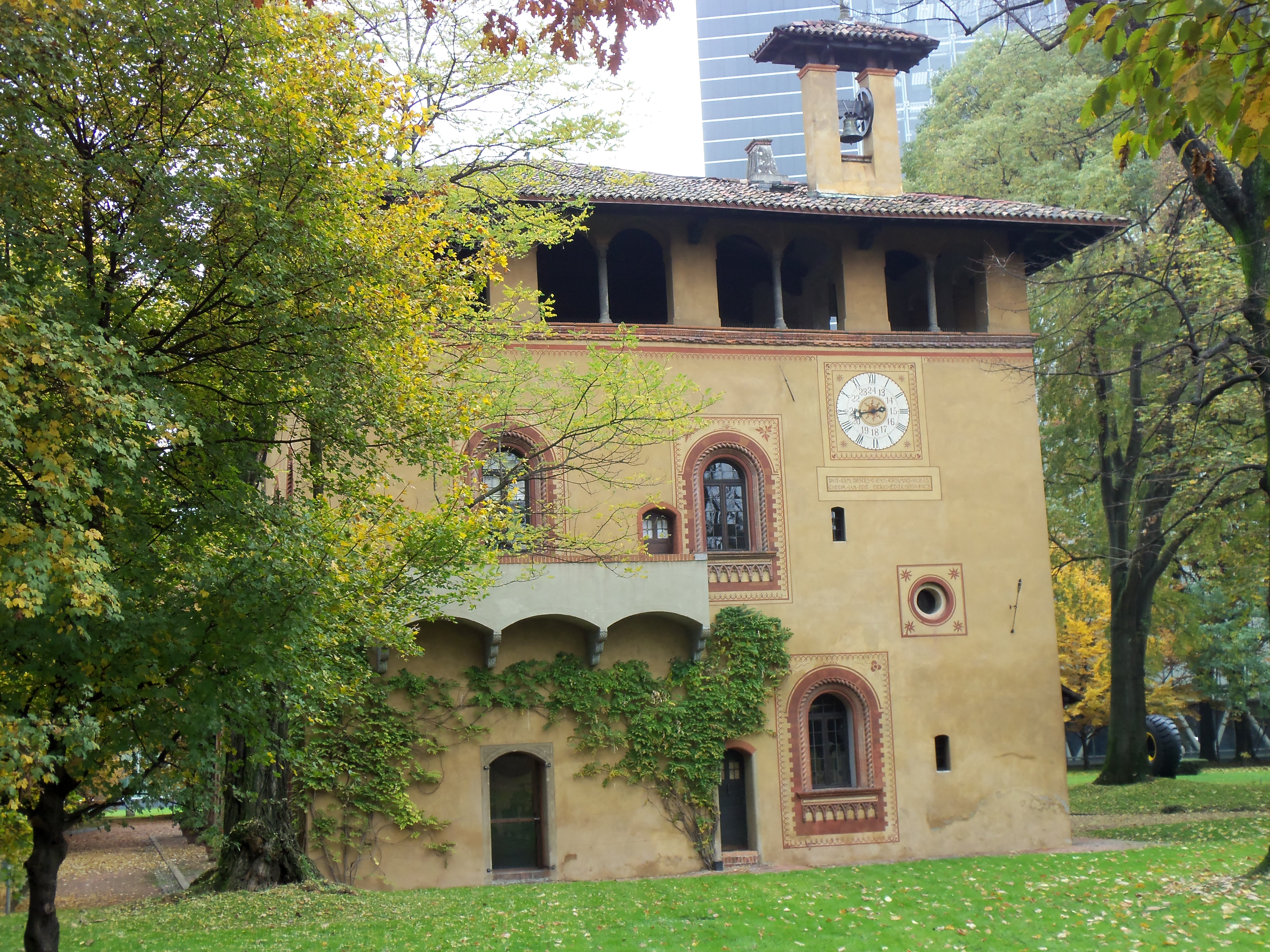
- La Bicocca degli Arcimboldi

- Location within Italy

General information
- Status: In use
- Architectural style: Renaissance
- Location: viale Sarca 214, Bicocca district, Milan, Italy
- Coordinates: 45°31′7.53″N 9°12′41.13″E
- Completed: second half 15th century
- Client: Arcimboldi

The Bicocca degli Arcimboldi is an Italian villa built in the second half of the 15th century as the country residence of the Arcimboldi family. Once situated in a totally rural area not far from Milan, it is now located within the homonymous district, in a now totally urbanised context.

== History ==
Subsequent to the period of the Aurea Repubblica Ambrosiana, during the second half of the 15th century, the noble Arcimboldi family of Parma had their country villa built in this area about five kilometres north of Milan. It owes its name of "bicocca" to the fact that it was a sort of stronghold or castle of modest proportions, located at the time in a totally rural context.

Some studies have identified two reference dates within which to ascribe the period in which its construction would have taken place: firstly, 1464, the year in which the Banco Mediceo in Milan was built, from which the string-course frieze under the reredos with the motto droit semper is said to derive; secondly, 1488, the year of Hungary, the mission of Guido Antonio Arcimboldi to the court of Matthias Corvinus, in commemoration of which he commissioned the decoration of the portico (now hidden by later graffiti).

After the extinction of the Arcimboldi, which occurred in 1732, the villa passed to the Arconati, then to the Busca and later to the Sormani. During the first decade of the 20th century it underwent heavy restoration probably directed by Luca Beltrami and carried out by Ambrogio Annoni, architect of the Sovrintendenza. The restoration, of a historicist nature, saw the reconstruction in style of some parts of the building, starting from some original traces or following an analogy with some similar buildings of the time. Several chimneys were inserted on this occasion and, on the eastern front, a bell gable with a clock. In the course of 1918, the Bicocca degli Arcimboldi finally passed into the hands of the Pirelli, who had established here at Bicocca the new production district of Pirelli. The small villa became the site of the rubber museum and the nursery school for the children of workers employed at Pirelli.

In 1933 a second restoration was carried out, again by Ambrogio Annoni, which mainly involved the decorations of the ladies' room, discovered during the previous restoration.

In the 1950s Piero Portaluppi conducted a third restoration that saw the creation of a large grand staircase and a more general redistribution of spaces (dictated by functional needs). The Bicocca degli Arcimboldi has since then become the Pirelli's representative offices, with meeting rooms and canteen for executives.

During the 1990s, the villa underwent a final restoration involving the garden and furnishings, conducted under the direction of Piero Castellini. Since then, the Bicocca degli Arcimboldi has not undergone any further interventions, and is nowadays – although it is now inserted in a totally urbanised context – one of the rare examples of 15th-century civil architecture in the countryside.

=== The Battle of the Bicocca ===
Near the Bicocca degli Arcimboldi took place on 27 April 1522 the famous Battle of the Bicocca, which pitted the Spanish army of Charles V of Habsburg against the French army of Francesco I of Valois, during the Fourth Italian War (1521–1526). The battle saw the defeat of the French, with a death toll of over three thousand: hence the famous saying: C'est une bicoque to symbolise a defeat. A depiction of the battle can be found in the chapel of Sant'Antonino in Segnano.

With the disappearance of the Arcimboldi family in 1727, the villa had then passed to other families and had experienced a certain degradation over time. Restored at the beginning of the Novecento, from 1913 it housed the first experiments of an open-air school for children in poor health, promoted by the private association Per la scuola' made up of doctors, teachers, private citizens and institutions, with a committee of patronesses led by Countess Carla Visconti di Modrone and Maria Giovanna Pirelli. In 1918, it was then acquired by Pirelli, which already owned its own stabilimenti e borghi nearby.

== Description ==
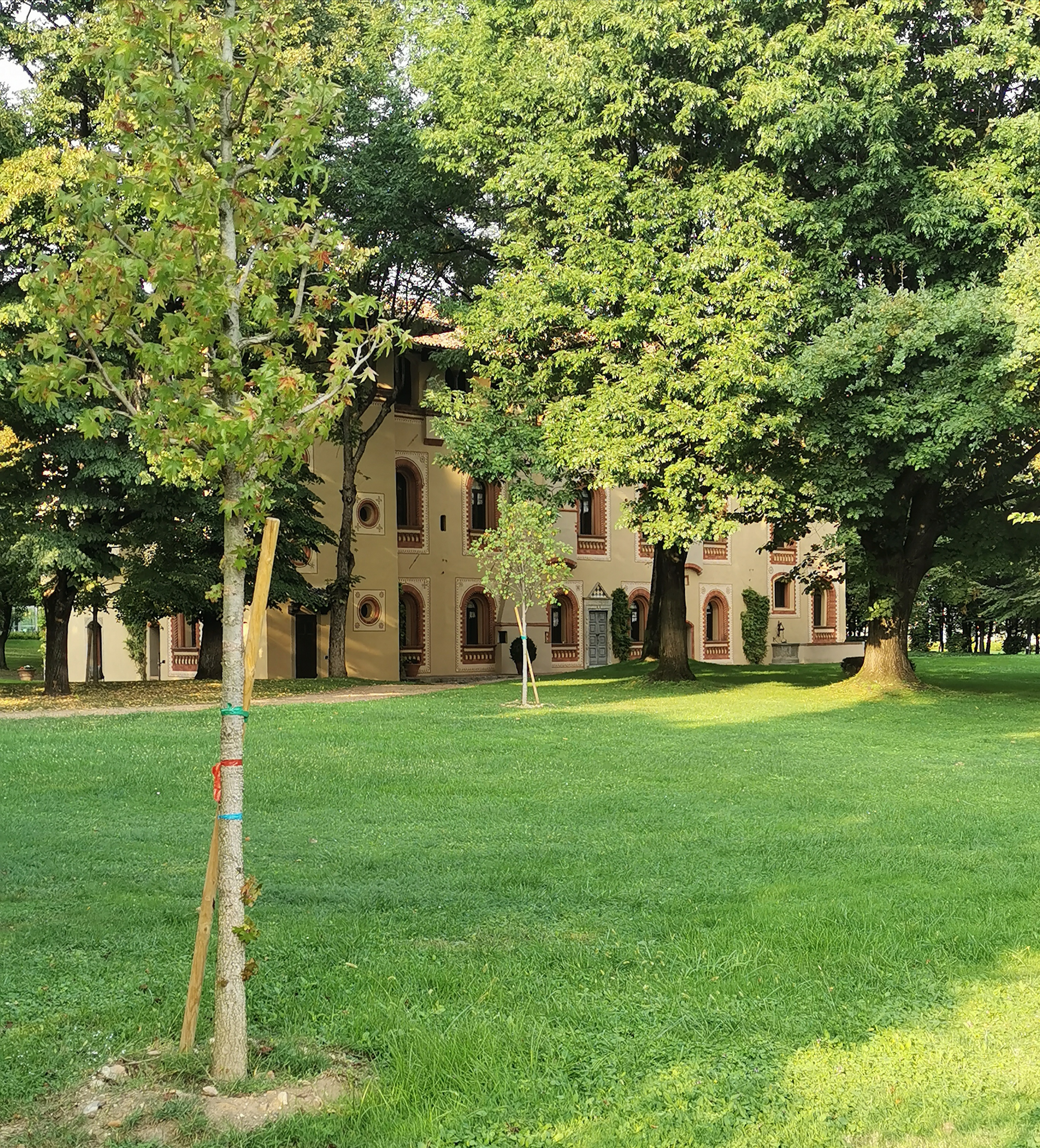
Bicocca seen from the side opposite the portico

The building has three levels, developing on a rectangular floor plan 40 m long and 13 m wide. On the east front, it has a columned portico developed on five round arches, placed asymmetrically, with a wooden trussed ceiling. The top floor consists of a loggia extending across the entire surface of the villa, covered by wooden trusses supporting the roof pitches. A cross-vaulted cellar extends only partially over a square portion of the roof. The only vertical connection prior to the 20th century restoration (which saw the introduction of a three-flight internal staircase) was the external staircase in the forepart at the end of the southern façade.

Some frescoes preserved inside the ladies' room constitute a very rare example of the depiction of the leisure and occupations of the ladies of the court: they depict moments of the mistress's day, from waking up accompanied by music, to playing chess, to preparing the nuptial bed. They are considered one of the best Lombard fresco cycles of the entire 15th century.

=== Pictorial decoration ===
The building houses numerous testimonies of the original pictorial decoration, in various states of conservation. In particular, the restorations completed in the 1990s have helped to consolidate and make known the remains of the paintings that decorated the reredos and the portico.

Two figures in particular have been restored between the windows of the reredos: a preparatory drawing of a knight standing in armour, referable to International Gothic stylistic features, and a 16th-century figure, three-quarter-length.

On the second floor, the so-called hall of the ladies, named after the subject of the fifteenth-century fresco cycle that decorates its walls, presents several scenes in which the various female occupations are depicted, framed within pavilions. There are only five scenes that are still legible, thanks in particular to the restorations carried out in 1933 by Mauro Pelliccioli, and they depict some women preparing or arranging their beds, making music with some musical instruments of the time, combing what was probably the mistress of the house, playing chess, and cutting and sewing some fabrics (and in this last scene a nana is also depicted). The scenes can be read as simply depicting the different moments of the mistress of the house's day, but they also refer back to the tradition of the Tacuina sanitatis, precisely because of the choice to realistically illustrate moments of life. These frescoes, which are of uncertain date (although they can be ascribed with certainty to the second half of the 15th century), do, however, present characteristic female hairstyles, which place them in dialogue with other decorative cycles in Lombardy, and in particular those in Palazzo Borromeo in Milan.

It is due to the interventions made by Piero Portaluppi in 1953, with the insertion of a scalone and the consequent elimination of the ceiling of the room chosen for this modification, that the paintings of the room corresponding to the second floor appear as if suspended. Several figures appear intent on the savings of the wealthy classes: one woman appears intent on fishing, two others gather wildflowers and a bundle of hay or straw, while two players of wind instruments (bombard and bagpipes) accompany the dances of ladies and knights (the cycle is patchy, however, and several figures are now lost).

The frescoes of the portico, on the other hand, have almost completely disappeared, although a fragment remains, reduced to the state of sinopia, of one of the scenes that must have composed a real cycle on its walls. The subject of the paintings is known, however, thanks to an oration composed in 1550, on the occasion of the appointment as archbishop of Milan of Giovannangelo Arcimboldi. Composed by the humanist Marcantonio Maioragio, the text clearly indicates how the different scenes of the cycle represented the different stages and moments in which the diplomatic mission conducted in Hungary by the archbishop's predecessor, Guidantonio Arcimboldi, on behalf of the Sforza. The sources place the mission in 1488, a few months after the celebration by procura of the marriage between John Corvinus, illegitimate son of the King of Hungary Matthias Corvinus, and Bianca Maria Sforza (later instead going to marry Emperor Massimilian of Habsburg, following the annulment of this union): the goal, in addition to settling delicate political issues, was to agree on the details of the journey that the bride would undertake in the following months (or so it was thought) to reach her groom. The paintings of the portico were later commissioned by Guidantonio himself to celebrate and remind posterity of the diplomatic mission he conducted.

== See also ==
- Villa Simonetta

== Bibliography ==
=== Italian sources ===
- Ambrogio Annoni, La Bicocca degli Arcimboldi. L'edificio quattrocentesco della Bicocca presso Milano, Milano, 1922.
- Ambrogio Annoni, Di alcuni dipinti della Bicocca degli Arcimboldi, Roma-Milano, 1934.
- Paolo Mezzanotte, Giacomo Carlo Bascapè, Milano nell'arte e nella storia, Milano, 1948 – pp. 804–805
- Santino Langé, Ville della provincia di Milano, Milano, 1972 – pp. 54–65
- Liliana Grassi, Luisa Cogliati Arano, La Bicocca degli Arcimboldi, Milano, 1977.
- Francesco Porzio (a cura di), La Bicocca degli Arcimboldi, Milano, 2000.
