= Archibald Hamilton =

Archibald Hamilton may refer to:

- Lord Archibald Hamilton (1673–1754), Scottish politician
- Archibald Hamilton, 9th Duke of Hamilton (1740–1819), Scottish peer and politician
- Lord Archibald Hamilton (1769–1827), son of the above, MP for Lanarkshire
- Archibald Hamilton (1790–1815), officer in the United States Navy
- Sir Archibald Hamilton, 5th Baronet (1876–1939), British convert to Islam
- Archibald Hamilton (bishop) (c.1580–1659), Anglican archbishop of Cashel
- A. M. Hamilton (Archibald Milne Hamilton, 1898–1972), New Zealand-born civil engineer
- Archie Hamilton (born 1941), British Conservative politician, MP 1978–2001
- Archie Hamilton (DJ), DJ, producer and label owner
- Archie Hamilton, co-founder of Chinese music company Split Works
- Archibald Sillars Hamilton (died 1884) phrenologist in colonial Australia
- Arch Hamilton (1915–1999), Australian rules footballer

== See also ==
- Archibald Hamilton Charteris, Church of Scotland theologian
