= Techno Airlines =

British music magazine

- Categories: Music magazine
- First issue: 2018; 7 years ago
- Country: United Kingdom
- Based in: London
- Language: English
- Website: technoairlines.com

Techno Airlines, a London-based global online platform and brand, is dedicated to promoting electronic music, particularly techno, and its sub-genres. Since its establishment in 2018, the platform has been a hub for the techno music community offering curated content, event and festival coverage, and exclusive interviews. Notably, it plays a crucial role in promoting emerging artists and fostering a global network of techno enthusiasts.

== History ==
Techno Airlines was founded in 2018 by a team of music enthusiasts and professionals. It has evolved from a simple blog to a comprehensive resource for electronic music fans. Their vision was to create an inclusive and dynamic space for the techno music community. Over time, it expanded its offerings to include events, curated playlists, and exclusive content from renowned techno artists.

As a global platform, Techno has been collaborating and interviewing artists from all around the globes such as Claptone, Rebekah, Archie Hamilton.
