= Bicocca (district of Milan) =

Coordinates: 45°30′48″N 9°12′44″E

- Quartiere of Milan
- Interactive map of Bicocca
- Country: Italy
- Region: Lombardy
- Province: Milan
- Comune: Milan
- Zone: 9
- Time zone: UTC+1 (CET)
  - Summer (DST): UTC+2 (CEST)

Bicocca is a district ("quartiere") of Milan, Italy, part of the Zone 9 administrative division. It was incorporated in the city in 1841. The main historic landmark of the district is the 15th century Villa Arcimboldi. In the last decades of the 20th century, the district has been subject to a major requalification project that led to the construction of important facilities such as the University of Milan Bicocca seats and the Teatro degli Arcimboldi.

== History ==
The toponymy "Bicocca" is probably a reference to a villa that was built in 1450 and that was owned by the aristocratic family of the Arcimboldi, as the word "Bicocca" is an archaic term meaning "small castle located in an elevated place". The villa is still in place, and it is one of the landmarks of the Bicocca district.

In 1522, the place was the setting of a famous battle between the Spanish of Charles V and the French of Francis I.

In the 19th century, the area of Bicocca was affected by a quick industrialization process, and was gradually absorbed into the urban agglomerate of Milan. It remained an autonomous comune until 1841, when it was annexed to Niguarda, which in turn became part of Milan in 1923.

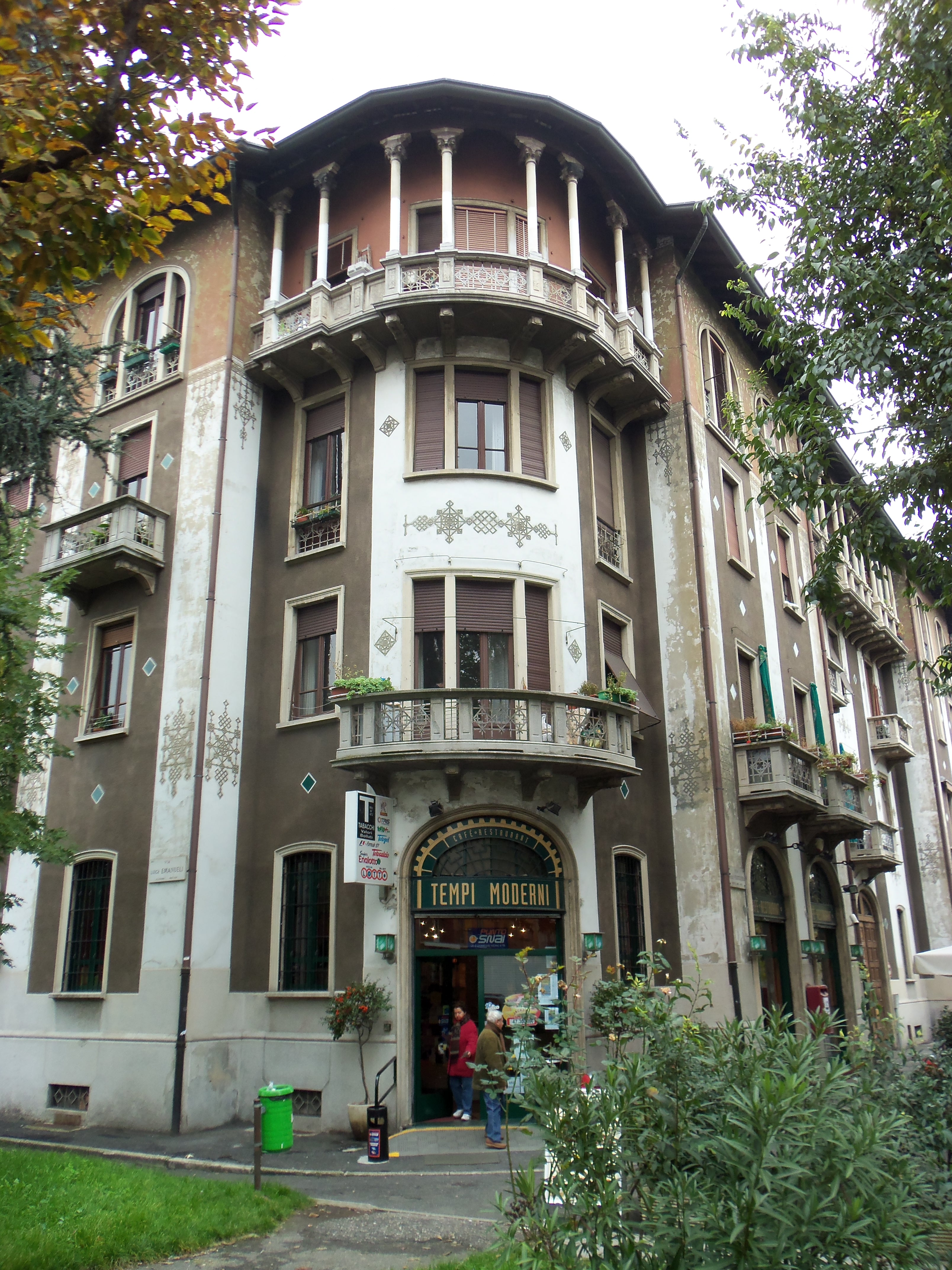
One of the surviving buildings of the historic Borgo Pirelli

In the first half of the 20th century Bicocca became the centre of an important industrial area that also comprised Greco and Sesto San Giovanni, and that greatly contributed to the Italian economy of the time. The first facilities to be established in Bicocca were those of Pirelli, Ansaldobreda, and Wagons-Lits. In the nearby area of Sesto, the Falck steel mill was also a prominent factory. Pirelli maintained a leading role in the area. A historic neighbourhood of Bicocca, "Borgo Pirelli" ("Pirelli Town"), was originally developed as a residential area for the thousands of workers that were employed in the Pirelli factories.

Coherently with its leading role in Italian industry, Bicocca was also the setting of some of the most important events in the history of Italian trade unions and workers' rights. In 1943, a 28 days strike was declared by the workers of Pirelli, Falck, Magneti-Marelli, Borletti, FACE-Bovisa, Caproni, and Alfa Romeo. The strike had a wide resonance as it was in direct opposition of the anti-strike laws introduced by the "Codice Rocco" designed by Alfredo Rocco and thus, indirectly, of the fascist regime. About 40 workers of Pirelli were arrested. In a subsequent riot in 1944, thousands of workers were arrested and deported to Nazi concentration camps. Many of those that escaped arrest in 1944 would become partisans of the National Liberation Committee.

Deindustrialization of the Bicocca district began in the 1970s.

In 1985, Pirelli started a project to redevelop the area. The resulting "Progetto Bicocca" (Bicocca Project), which affected an area of 960.000 m^{2}, was the largest urban transformation project in the history of Italy, and the second in Europe, after that of Berlin. The prominent results of this project were the construction of a large university district (called University of Milan Bicocca) and of the Teatro degli Arcimboldi, a large theatre that has also been used to house La Scala shows while the historic La Scala theatre was undergoing restoration. Other main buildings realized by the project were a seat of the CNR (National Council of Research) and the Istituto Neurologico Besta, a major neurological hospital. Several companies now have their Milanese headquarters in Bicocca, including Pirelli, Siemens, Deutsche Bank, Reuters, Fastweb, Johnson & Johnson, and Hachette-Rusconi.

== Villa Arcimboldi ==
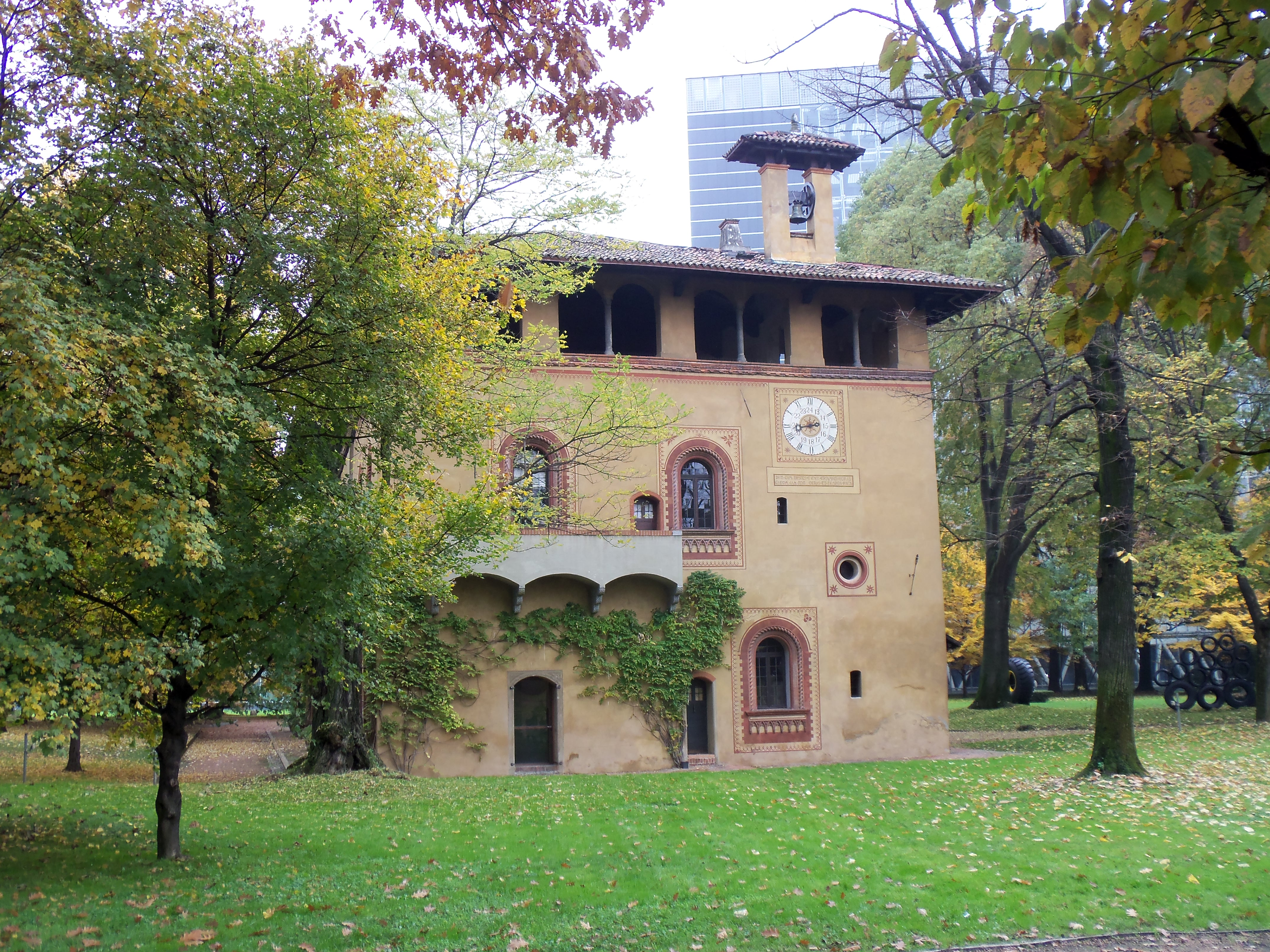
Villa Arcimboldi

The villa of the Arcimboldi (also known as "Bicocca degli Arcimboldi"), built in 1450, has been owned by several prominent families of the Milanese, and experienced a period of decay until it was restored in the early 20th century. From 1913 it became an experimental "open air school" for sick children. Carla Visconti di Modrone and Maria Pirelli greatly contributed to this project.

In 1918 the villa was acquired by the Pirelli company, that had already established many facilities in the area.
