= Archibald Douglas =

Archibald Douglas may refer to:

- Sir Archibald Douglas (died 1333), Guardian of Scotland, killed at the Battle of Halidon Hill
- Archibald Douglas, 3rd Earl of Douglas
- Archibald Douglas, 4th Earl of Douglas and Duke of Touraine (1370–1424)
- Archibald Douglas, 5th Earl of Douglas (1390–1439)
- Archibald Douglas, Earl of Moray (1426–1455)
- Archibald Douglas, 5th Earl of Angus (1453–1514)
- Archibald Douglas of Kilspindie (1475–1536)
- Archibald Douglas, 6th Earl of Angus (1490–1557)
- Archibald Douglas of Glenbervie (1513–1570), Scottish nobleman
- Archibald Douglas, Parson of Douglas (before 1540–after 1600), Scottish diplomat and intriguer
- Archibald Douglas, 8th Earl of Angus and 5th Earl of Morton (1556–1588)
- Archibald Douglas, 1st Earl of Ormond (1609–1655)
- Archibald Douglas, 1st Earl of Forfar and 2nd Earl of Ormond (1653–1712)
- Archibald Douglas, 2nd Earl of Forfar and 3rd Earl of Ormond (1692–1715)
- Archibald Douglas, 13th of Cavers (died 1741), member of parliament for Dumfries Burghs 1727–34
- Archibald Douglas, 1st Duke of Douglas (1694–1761)
- Archibald Douglas (British Army officer, born 1707) (1707–1778), member of parliament for Dumfries Burghs 1754–61 and Dumfriesshire 1761–74
- Archibald Douglas, 1st Baron Douglas (1748–1827), member of parliament for Forfarshire
- Archibald Ramsay Douglas (1807–1886), Scottish miniature painter
- Archibald Douglas, 8th Marquess of Queensberry (1818–1858)
- Archibald Lucius Douglas (1842–1913), Canadian officer of the British Navy
- J. Archibald Douglas (born 1866), professor of English and history
- Archie Douglas (1867–1953), English cricketer
- Archibald Douglas, 4th Baron Blythswood (1870–1929)
- Archibald Douglas (1883–1960), general, chief of the Swedish Army
- A. H. Douglas (1885–1972), All-American football player for the United States Naval Academy

== See also ==
- Archibald of Douglas (died c. 1238), abbot of Dunfermline Abbey (1178–1198) and Scottish knight
