= Archibald Cameron =

Archibald Cameron may refer to:

- Archibald Cameron of Lochiel (1707–1753), Jacobite leader
- Archibald Donald Cameron (1866–1946), minister of the Free Church of Scotland
- Sir Archibald Cameron (British Army officer) (1870–1944), British general
- Archibald Cameron (sailor) (1919–1987), Canadian Olympian

== See also ==
- Archie Cameron (1895–1956), Australian politician
