= Arcimboldi =

- Coat of arms of Cardinal Giovanni Arcimboldi

Origin
- Region of origin: Italy

Other names
- Variant forms: Archambault; Archambeault; Archibald

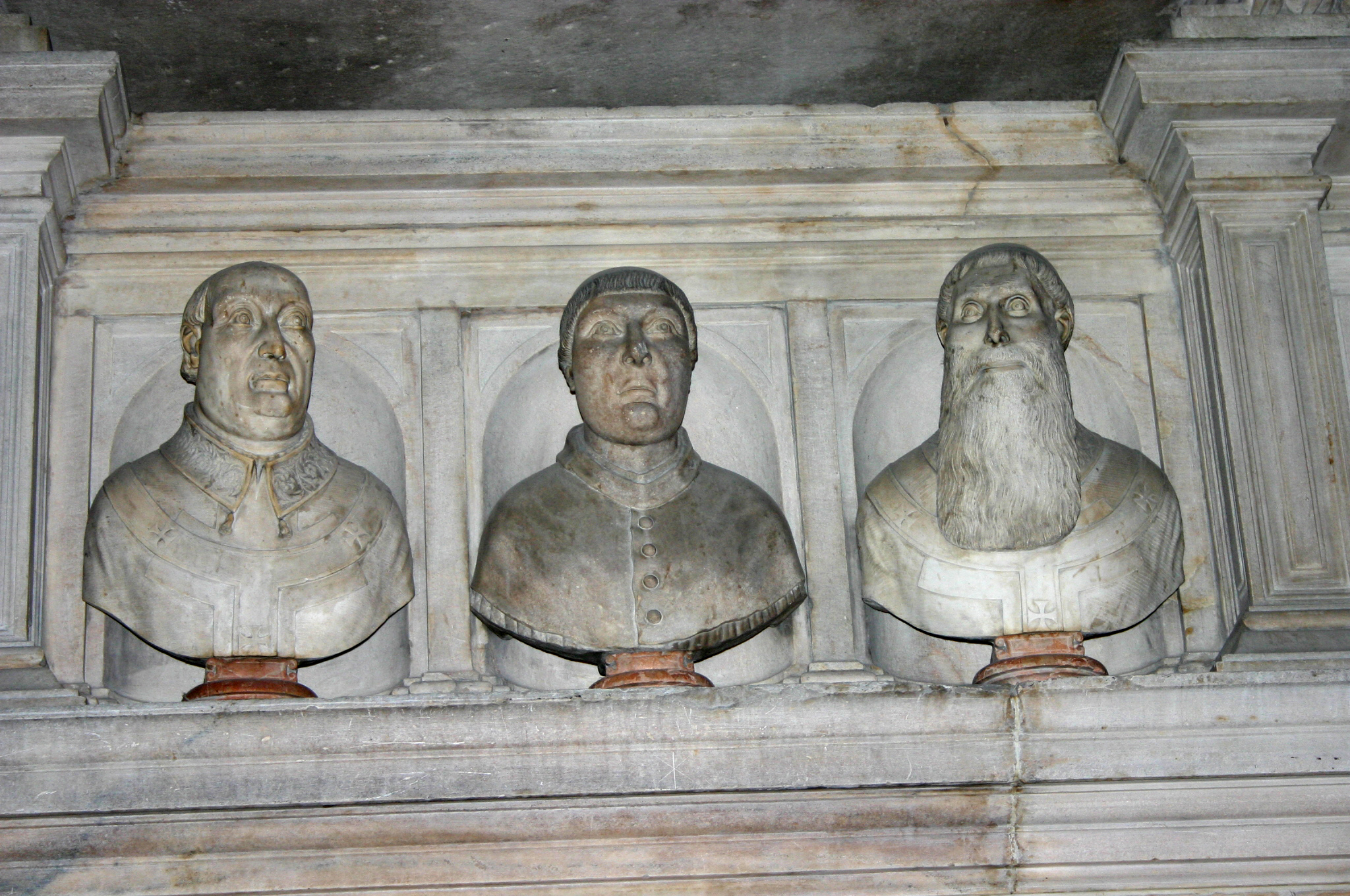
A sculpture in Milan Cathedral at the tombs of the 3 Arcimboldi Archbishops of Milan, Giovanni Arcimboldi, Giovanni Angelo Arcimboldi and Guido Antonio Arcimboldi

Arcimboldi or Arcimboldo is an Italian surname of Old High German origin. Variant forms of the surname are the Old French Archambault and Archambeault, and the English Archibald.

== People with the surname ==
- Giovanni Arcimboldi (died 1488), Italian prelate, Cardinal Archbishop of Milan (1484–1488)
- Guido Antonio Arcimboldi (1428–1497) Italian prelate, Archbishop of Milan (1489–1497)
- Giovanni Angelo Arcimboldi (1485–1555), Italian prelate, Archbishop of Milan (1550–1555)
- Giuseppe Arcimboldo (1526/1527–1593), Italian painter

== Fictional characters with the name ==
- Benno von Archimboldi, a character in Roberto Bolaño's novel 2666 (2004)

== See also ==
- Archambeault
- Archambault
- Archibald
