= George Archibald =

George Archibald may refer to:

- George Archibald, 1st Baron Archibald (1898–1975), British Labour politician
- George Archibald (footballer) (1919–2006), Australian footballer for Melbourne
- George Archibald (jockey) (1890–1927), American jockey
- George Archibald (politician) (born 1946), Canadian provincial politician of the Progressive Conservative Party of Nova Scotia
- George Christopher Archibald (1926–1996), British economist
- George D. Archibald (1820–1902), American college president
- George W. Archibald (born 1946), North American ornithologist who founded the International Crane Foundation
