= George Quincy =

American classical composer

George Quincy (born in Oklahoma, United States) is an American composer and conductor of Choctaw heritage. He has composed for theater, dance, music, and television.

Quincy holds degrees from the Juilliard School, where he has also taught. He worked with the Martha Graham Dance Company.

Quincy has performed at the National Museum of the American Indian. His music has been performed by Timothy Archambault. A CD of Quincy's music, entitled Choctaw Nights, was released by Albany Records. Another was released by Lyrichord Classical.

He is an advisor to the First Nations Composer Initiative.

He lives in New York City.
