= Dompierre-sur-Mer =

- Commune
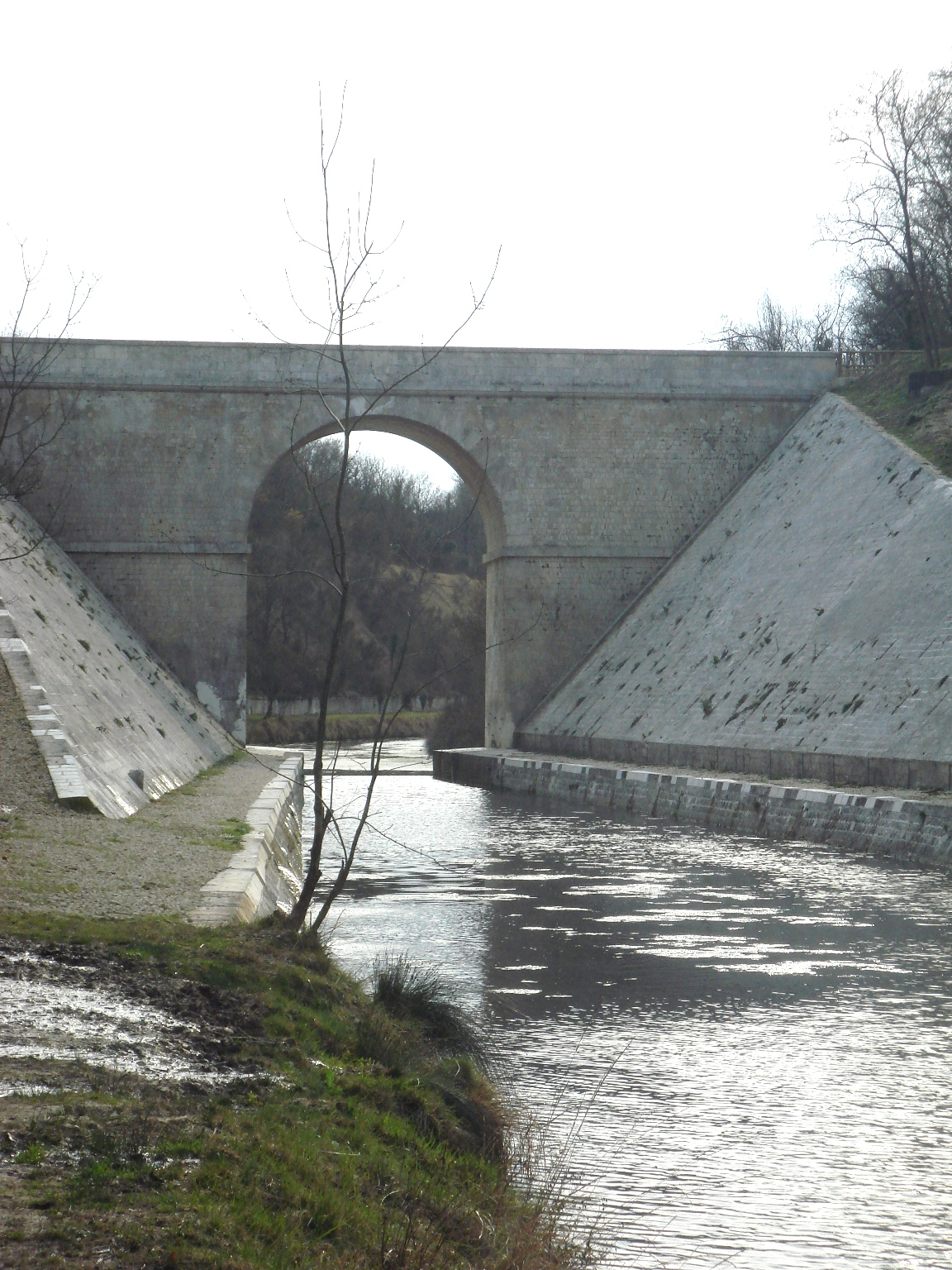
- The Canal de Marans and its bridge

- Coat of arms
- Location of Dompierre-sur-Mer
- Location within France Location within Nouvelle-Aquitaine
- Coordinates: 46°11′19″N 1°03′49″W
- Country: France
- Region: Nouvelle-Aquitaine
- Department: Charente-Maritime
- Arrondissement: La Rochelle
- Canton: Aytré
- Intercommunality: CA La Rochelle

Government
  - Mayor (2020–2026): Guillaume Krabal
- Area^{1}: 18.35 km^{2} (7.08 sq mi)
- Highest elevation: 35 m (115 ft)
- Lowest elevation: 4 m (13 ft)
- Population (2023): 6,315
  - Density: 344.1/km^{2} (891.3/sq mi)
- Time zone: UTC+01:00 (CET)
  - Summer (DST): UTC+02:00 (CEST)
- INSEE/Postal code: 17142 /17139
- ^{1} French Land Register data, which excludes lakes, ponds, glaciers > 1 km^{2} (0.386 sq mi or 247 acres) and river estuaries.

Dompierre-sur-Mer (French pronunciation: [dɔ̃pjɛʁ syʁ mɛʁ], literally Dompierre on Sea, before 1962: Dompierre) is a commune in the Charente-Maritime department, southwestern France.

== Population ==
Historical population
Year	Pop.	±% p.a.
1968	1,947	—
1975	2,928	+6.00%
1982	3,472	+2.46%
1990	3,627	+0.55%
1999	4,305	+1.92%
2007	5,277	+2.58%
2012	5,348	+0.27%
2017	5,482	+0.50%
2023	6,315	+2.39%
Source: INSEE

== Personalities ==
- Auguste-Louis de Rossel de Cercy
- Jacques Archambault, Early settler of New France with his wife and seven children. Dug first well in Ville-Marie Montreal for Paul Chomedey de Maisonneuve.

== See also ==
- Communes of the Charente-Maritime department
