= Busca =

Busca may refer to:

== People ==
- Antonio Busca (lieutenant) (1767–1834), Italian nobleman and lieutenant
- Antonio Busca (painter) (1625–1686), Italian painter
- Gianmarco Busca (born 1965), Italian catholic bishop
- Ignazio Busca (1731–1803), Italian cardinal
- Pasquale Busca (born 1948), Italian racewalker

== Places ==
- Busca, Piedmont, Italy
- Bușca, Mihăești, Olt, Romania
