= Marans, Charente-Maritime =

Marans
- Commune
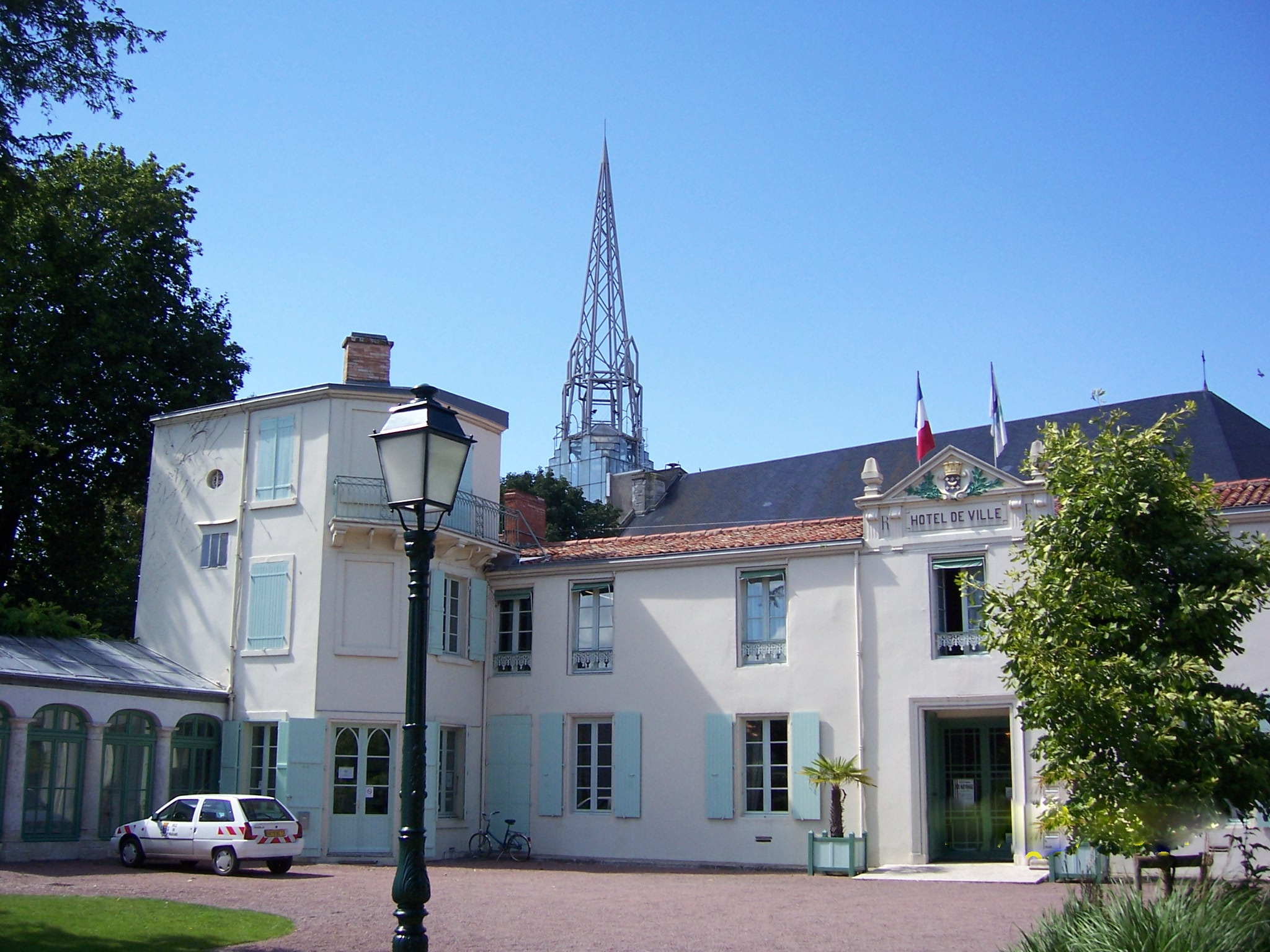
- Town hall and church steeple

- Coat of arms
- Location of Marans
- Location within France Location within Nouvelle-Aquitaine
- Coordinates: 46°18′33″N 0°59′29″W
- Country: France
- Region: Nouvelle-Aquitaine
- Department: Charente-Maritime
- Arrondissement: La Rochelle
- Canton: Marans

Government
  - Mayor (2020–2026): Jean-Marie Bodin
- Area^{1}: 82.49 km^{2} (31.85 sq mi)
- Elevation: 6 m (20 ft)
- Highest elevation: 13 m (43 ft)
- Lowest elevation: 0 m (0 ft)
- Population (2023): 4,476
  - Density: 54.26/km^{2} (140.5/sq mi)
- Time zone: UTC+01:00 (CET)
  - Summer (DST): UTC+02:00 (CEST)
- INSEE/Postal code: 17218 /17230
- ^{1} French Land Register data, which excludes lakes, ponds, glaciers > 1 km^{2} (0.386 sq mi or 247 acres) and river estuaries.

Marans (French pronunciation: [maʁɑ̃]) is a commune in the Charente-Maritime department, administrative region of Nouvelle-Aquitaine (before 2015: Poitou-Charentes), southwestern France.

It is connected to La Rochelle by the Canal de Marans à La Rochelle. The inhabitants of Marans are known as marandais.

Marans is the most northern town in Charente-Maritime, and is sometimes considered to be the "gateway to Aunis", the former province in which it has always belonged since its creation.

Marans is a pleasant town on the river Sèvre niortaise which is a fishing port and a tourist destination. Being located north of La Rochelle, it has close relations with the latter to which it has much to owe for its rapid urban and economic growth.

== History ==
=== Toponymy ===
The etymology of Marans is believed to be from the Latin, mare ante which means before the sea.

=== Middle ages ===
From the 7th century, monks settled in the Gulf, which had been drained by numerous canals.

In the 10th century, the first castle was built after the barbarian attacks. By the 11th century, a small market town had gathered around the castle and the priory of Saint-Étienne, depending on the Maillezais Cathedral. The octagonal bell-tower dates back to the 14th century. The priory was pillaged during the French Wars of Religion, and the rebuilding started in 1605.

In the 13th century, as well as the 16th century, the Benedictine monks would drain out the land by digging canals. The development of these lands greatly contributed to the enrichment of the town. During the reign of Henry IV of France, Dutch specialists helped in the work of the lands.

In 1307, the castle could hold 2000 soldiers and 300 to 400 horses in case of danger.

=== Religious wars ===
In 1589, Henry IV captured Marans after a 4-day siege. It was then used as a place of safety for the Protestants.

Between 1627 and 1628, during the Siege of La Rochelle, Louis XIII stayed at Marans. Cardinal Richelieu reassured the castle for fear of occupation by the reformed troops after the departure of the royal guards. The last towers were demolished in the 18th century.

In 1659, the Sire of Breuil, count of Marans, donated part of his castle for the building of a Capuchin convent.

The port for a long time specialised in the trade of grains, the Sèvre Niortaise being just as navigable as Niort at that time.

Marans was famous until the early twentieth century for the red bean of Marans and its fairs in honour of these specially local beans.

Marans is also famous as the home of the Marans chicken. Marans chickens are famous as the layers of the darkest shell color of all chickens. This breed was originally developed in Southwest France between the 12th to the 14th century. The present form of this chicken was refined during the 19th century in the village of Marans. While fairly common in France, this breed is rare in America. Marans chickens lay exceptional eating gourmet eggs that are highly prized by chefs around the world.

=== French Revolution to Contemporary France ===
The first municipal council (conseil municipal) was elected February 3, 1790. The temple at Saint-Étienne was made into a "Temple of Reason". In the 19th Century, the commune didn't want to begin conservation work (Mayor's letter of 1845 to the Prefect). In 1885, the municipal council decided to build a new church, and consequently the community started the clearing of the ruins of the priory in Saint-Étienne, keeping only the clocktower which had been decreed a historical monument in 1921.

== Population ==
Historical population

Year	Pop.	±% p.a.
1793	4,400	—
1800	3,902	−1.70%
1806	3,764	−0.60%
1821	3,997	+0.40%
1831	4,041	+0.11%
1836	4,557	+2.43%
1841	4,713	+0.68%
1846	4,860	+0.62%
1851	4,645	−0.90%
1856	4,586	−0.26%
1861	4,510	−0.33%
1866	4,534	+0.11%
1872	4,284	−0.94%
1876	4,527	+1.39%
1881	4,736	+0.91%
1886	4,927	+0.79%
1891	4,609	−1.33%
1896	4,515	−0.41%
1901	4,387	−0.57%

Year	Pop.	±% p.a.
1906	4,459	+0.33%
1911	4,427	−0.14%
1921	3,828	−1.44%
1926	3,707	−0.64%
1931	3,575	−0.72%
1936	3,584	+0.05%
1946	3,377	−0.59%
1954	3,711	+1.19%
1962	3,680	−0.10%
1968	3,833	+0.68%
1975	3,987	+0.56%
1982	4,289	+1.05%
1990	4,170	−0.35%
1999	4,375	+0.53%
2007	4,655	+0.78%
2012	4,628	−0.12%
2017	4,497	−0.57%
2023	4,476	−0.08%

Source: EHESS and INSEE (1968-2023)

== See also ==
- Communes of the Charente-Maritime department
