= Marans-La Rochelle Canal =

Canal in France

Coordinates: 46°09′N 1°08′W

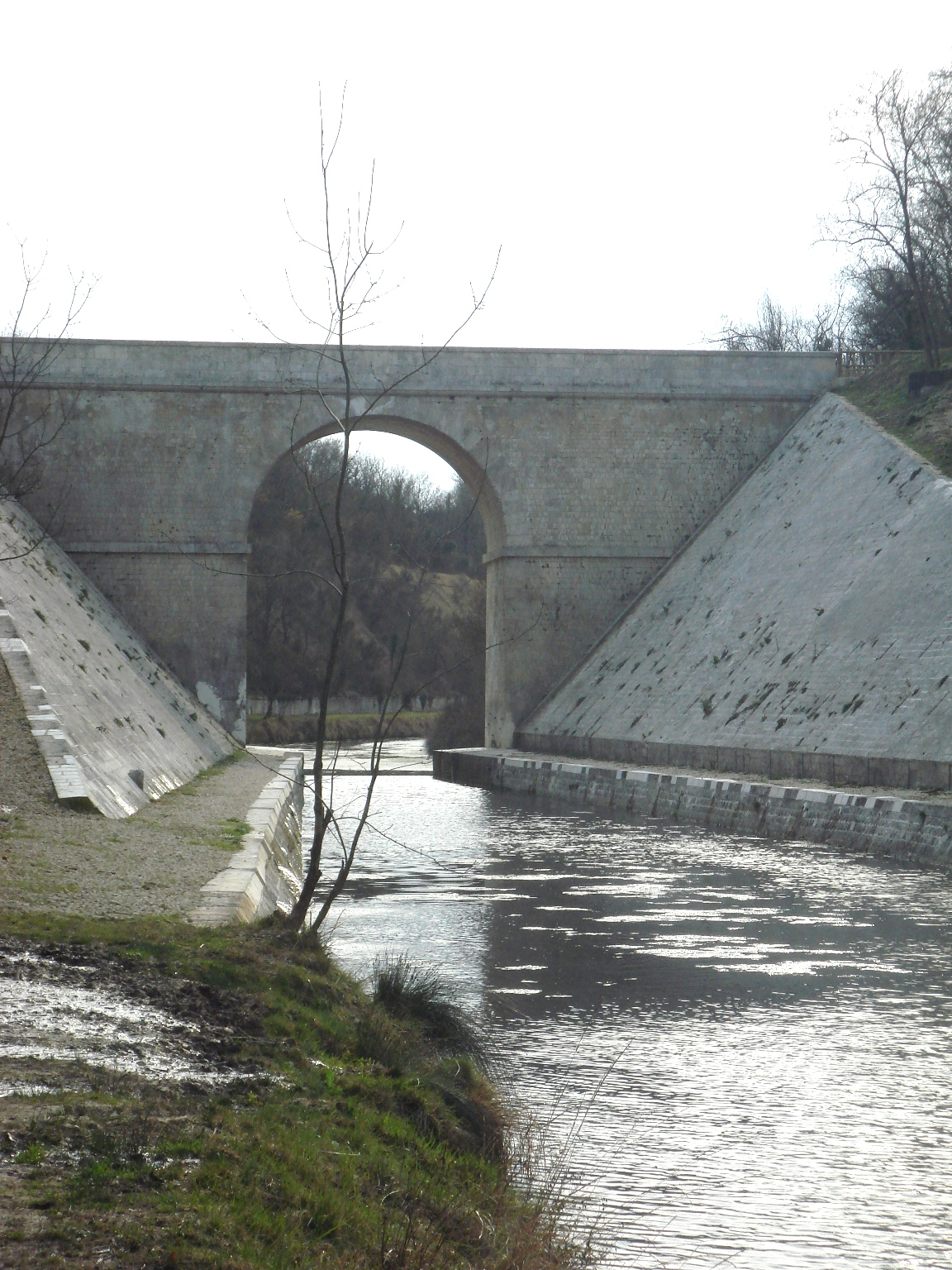
The canal de Marans, and its bridge at Dompierre-sur-Mer.

The Canal de Marans à La Rochelle (French pronunciation: [kanal də maʁɑ̃ a la ʁɔʃɛl]), also known as Canal de Marans, Canal de Rompsay ([kanal də ʁɔ̃sɛ]) or Canal de La Rochelle depending on the location, is a French canal in the Charente-Maritime department that connects the city of La Rochelle with the town of Marans. It also links the Sèvre Niortaise river to the harbour at La Rochelle. The canal passes through the communes of Dompierre-sur-Mer, Andilly and Sainte-Soulle. It is 24.5 km long, with 4 locks, and has a total level change of 1.7 m. Its width is 5.2 m.

The canal was built in the 19th century to promote trade between La Rochelle and Marans. It was part of a larger project to connect the Loire river to the Adour river via a North-South canal. Napoleon I ordered the project on 17 July 1805, with the goal of linking Niort to La Rochelle. Construction began in 1806, but the canal didn't open until 1875, and it wasn't until 1888 that it fully reached La Rochelle. The canal was built using forced labour of prisoners. However, upon completion, the rise of rail transportation (with the establishment of a track between Nantes and La Rochelle) led to the canal's decline. Navigation on the canal ceased entirely after the Second World War. Today, the canal is no longer navigable. The canal allows for picturesque walks between the two cities. It is renowned for its flora and fauna.

The waters of the canal discharge into the Maubec reservoir at La Rochelle, just before the tidal bassin, and its waters contribute to scour the harbour and navigable channels.

== Photos ==
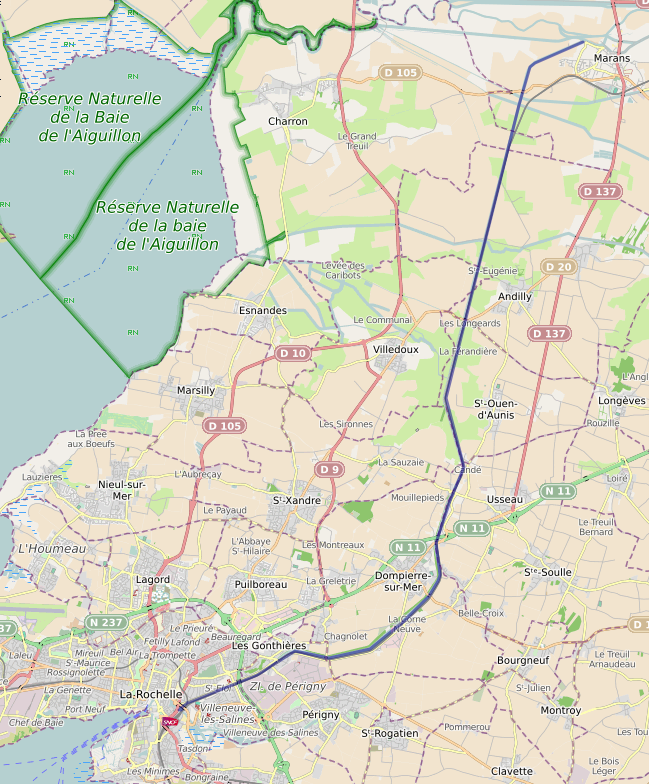
Channel layout

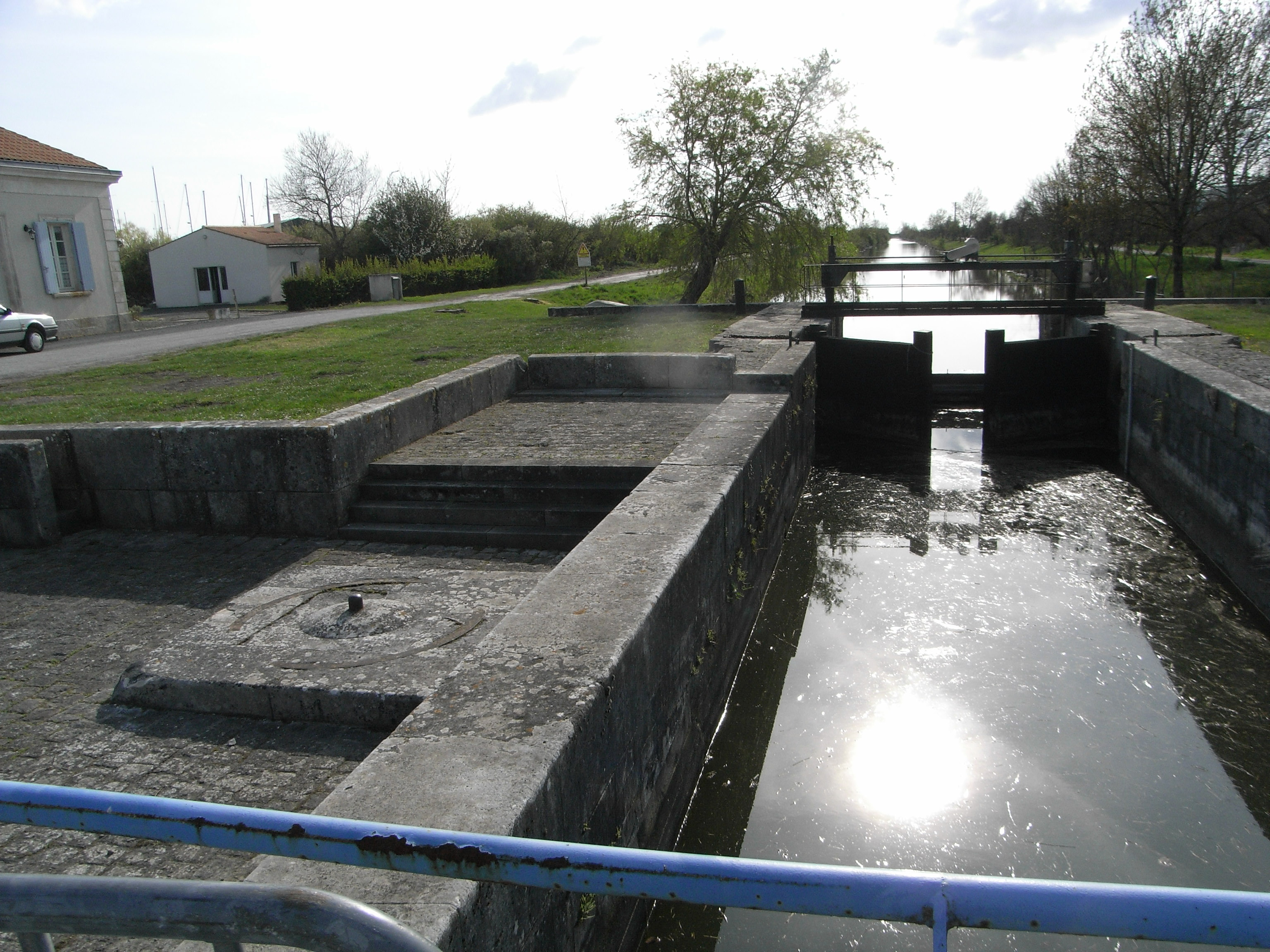
First locks

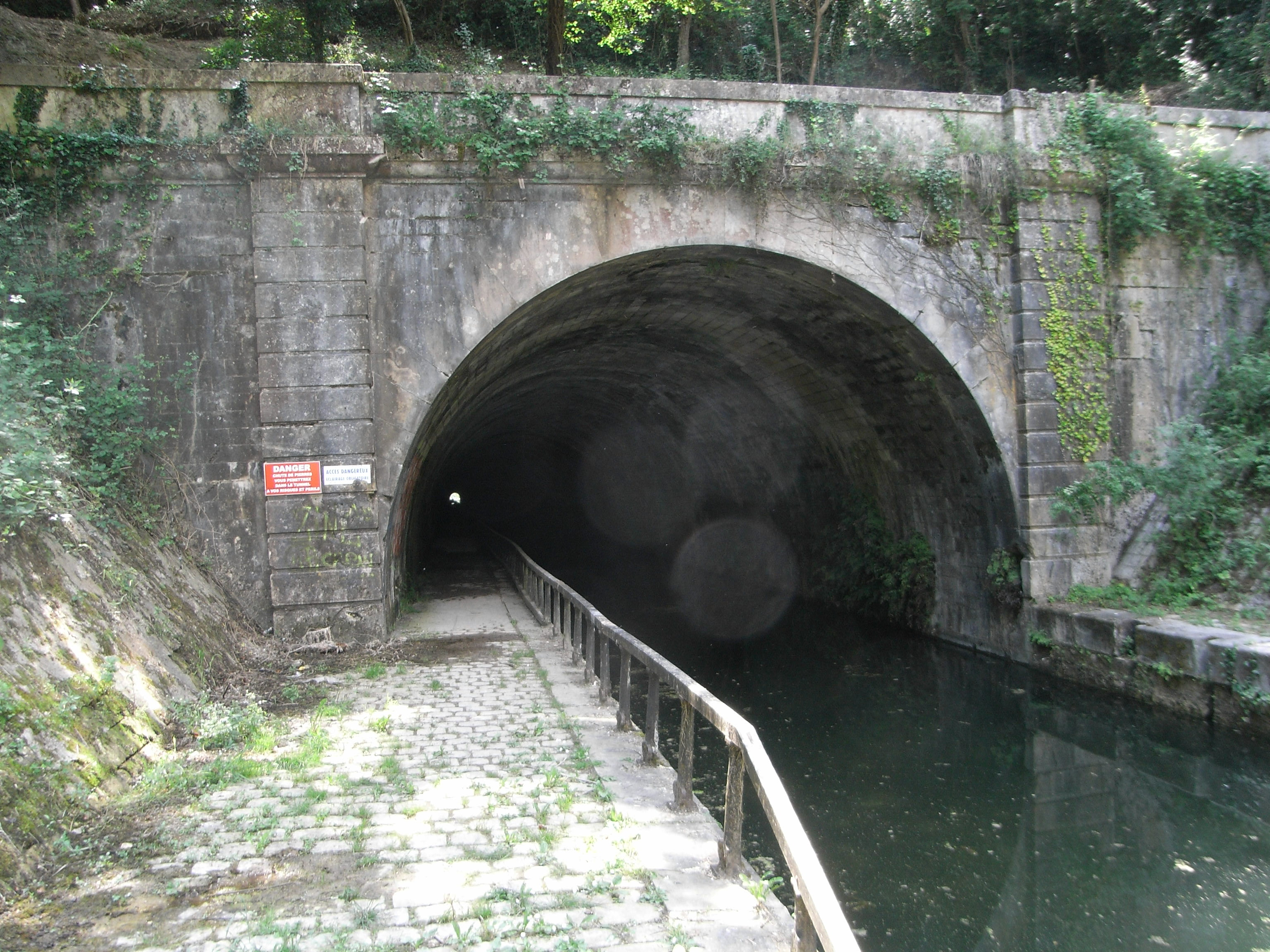
Tunnel

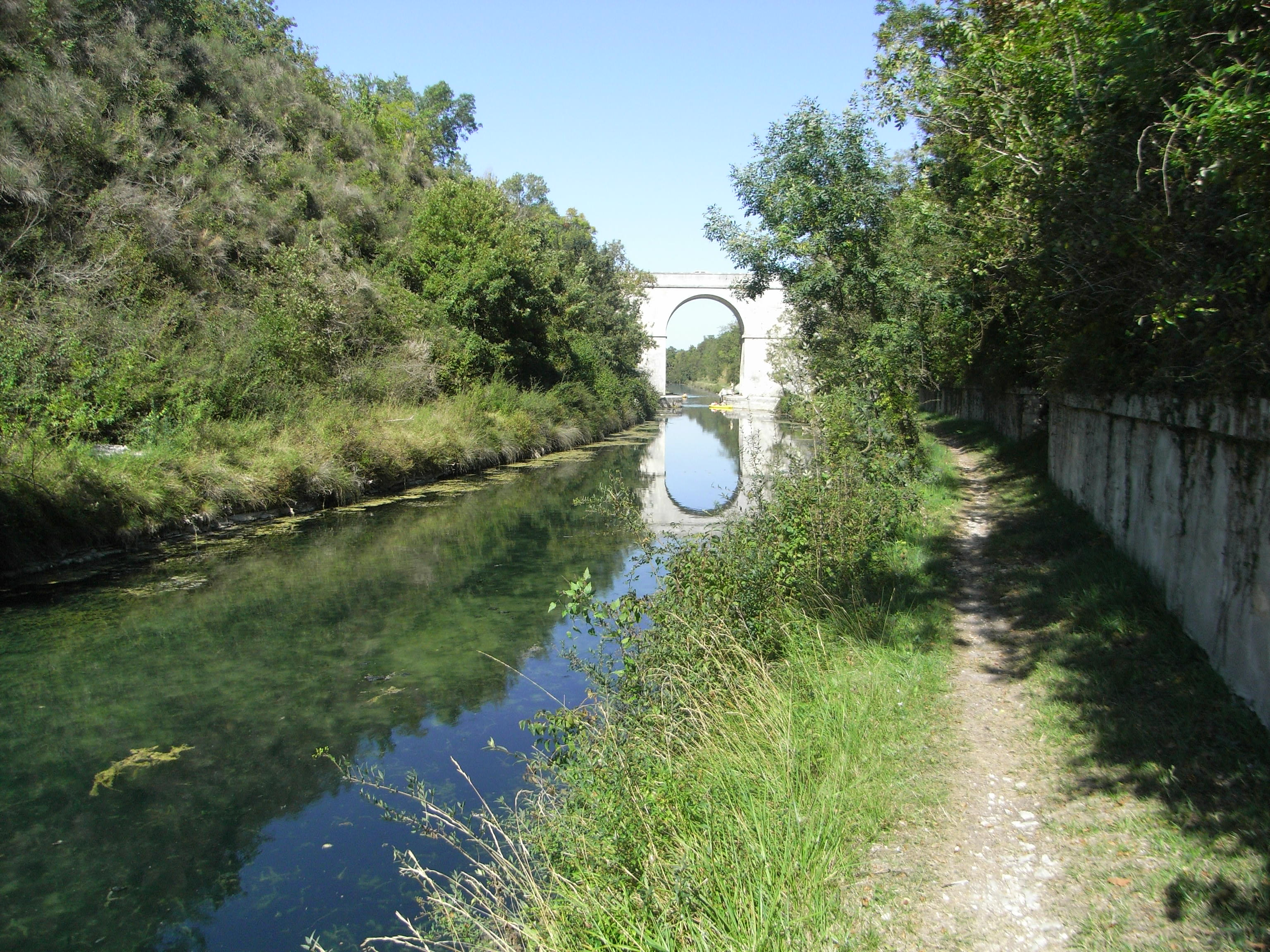
The canal

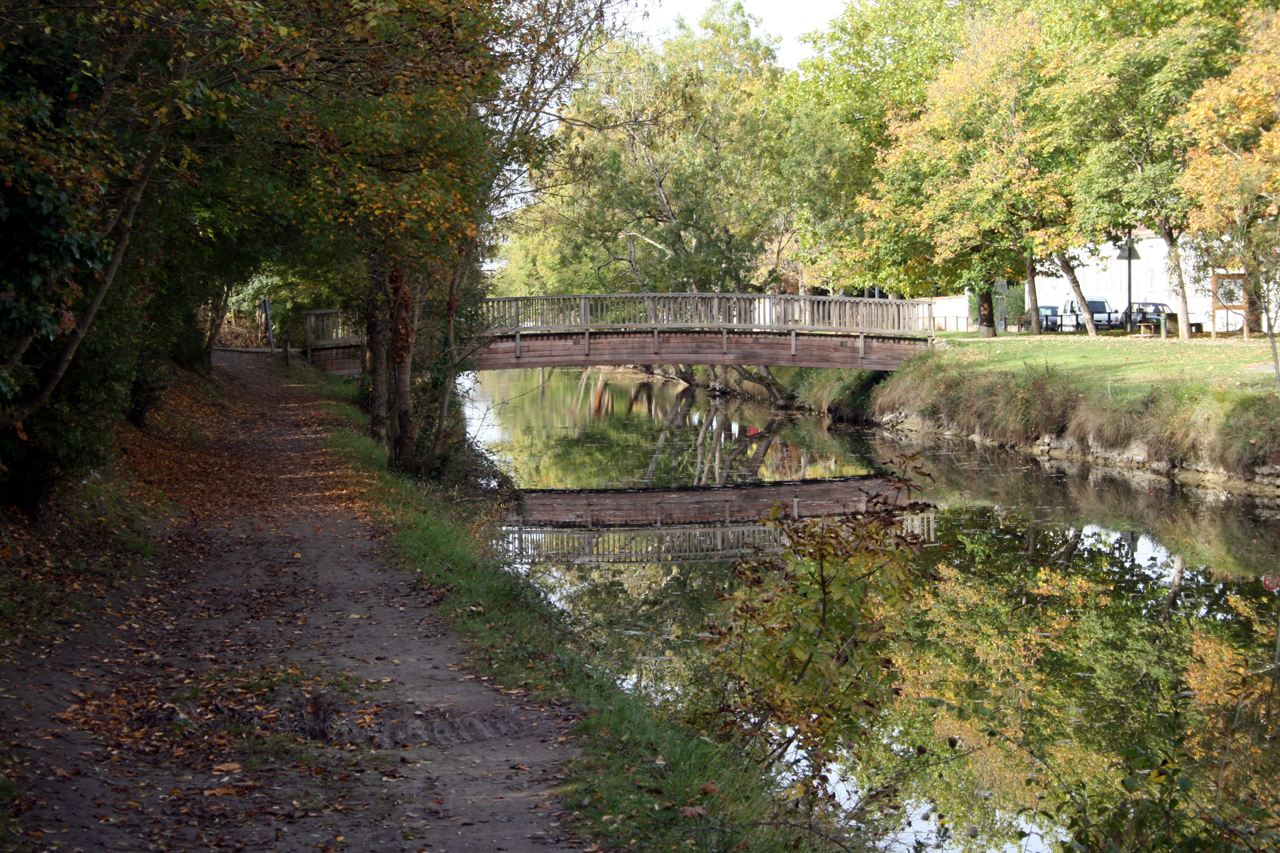
The canal at Rompsay

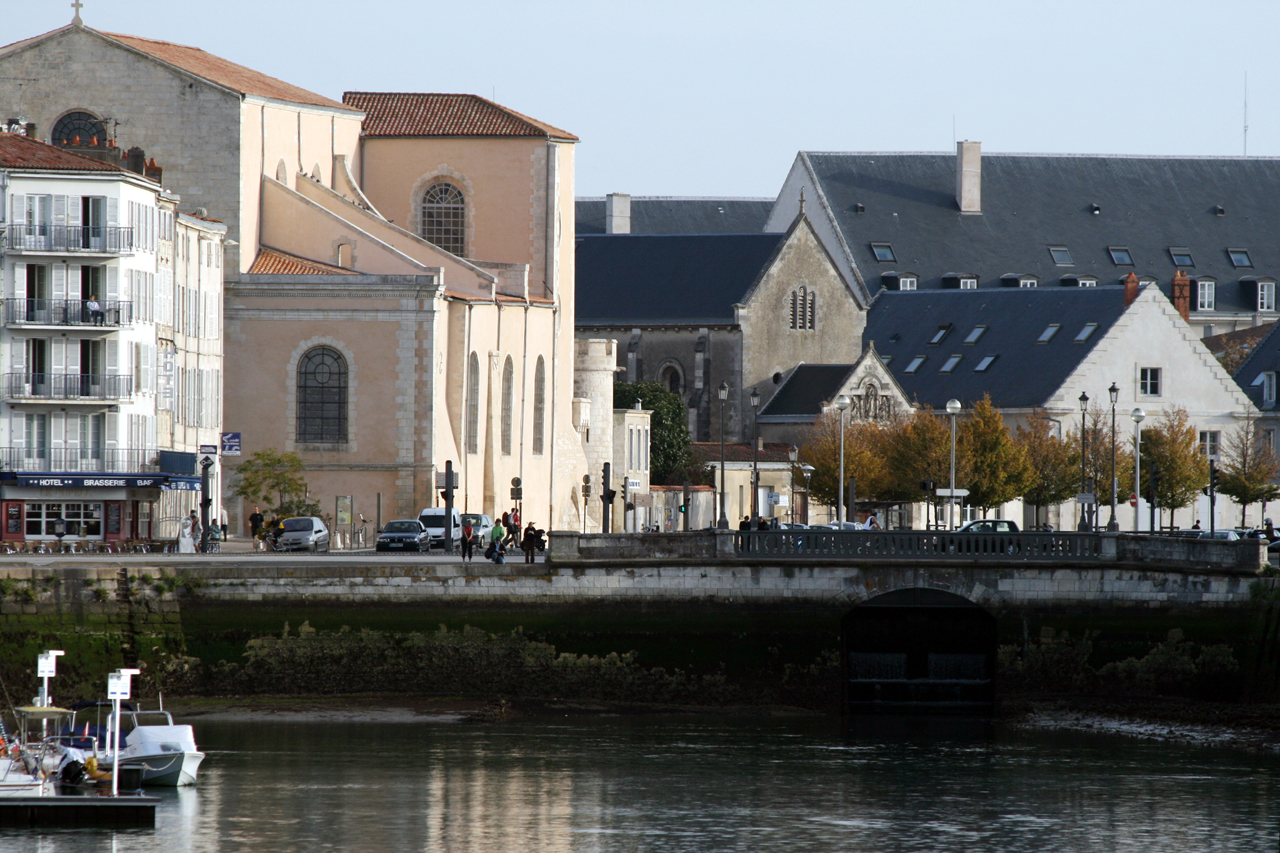
The last locks at La Rochelle

== See also ==
- List of canals in France
