= Archibald Donald Mackenzie =

- Born: October 22, 1914; Cheshire, England
- Died: October 6, 1944 (aged 29); Ponte dell'Olio, Italy
- Military career
- Allegiance: United Kingdom
- Branch: British Army
- Service years: 1936–1944
- Rank: Captain
- Unit: Queen's Own Cameron Highlanders
- Conflicts: World War II; Western Desert campaign; Battle of Crete; Battle of Gazala; Fall of Tobruk; Italian resistance movement

Archibald Donald Mackenzie (22 October 1914 – 6 October 1944), or Donny Mackenzie, was a captain of the 2nd Battalion the Queen's Own Cameron Highlanders, best known for escaping from prisoner of war (PoW) camp PG 29 at Veano near Piacenza in northern Italy; joining and serving as second-in-command of an Italian partisan force in Piacenza province, the Brigata Stella Rossa, which in the course of 1944 liberated the valley of the Nure; and also assisting other Allied prisoners and evaders (including at least 126 airmen) to make their way to Allied lines. He was shot by a Fascist patrol on 6 October 1944, immediately after taking the surrender of the Fascist garrison at Ponte dell'Olio. Thousands of local Italians attended his funeral in Bettola, the capital of the liberated zone, and he was buried in the cemetery there.

Born on 22 October 1914, he was the son of Captain Lynedoch Archibald Mackenzie and Dorothy Yates; his father was killed at Gallipoli in early 1915, never having seen his son. He was educated at Winchester College from 1928 to 1933. He then went to Christ Church, Oxford in October 1933 with a Kitchener Scholarship, to read classics. In 1936 he was granted a commission in the Queen’s Own Cameron Highlanders, and joined 2nd Battalion in Palestine. He was detached for service on the GHQ staff, helping with signals in the Western Desert and in the 1941 campaign in Greece. Evacuated to Crete, he was recalled to Egypt and then sent to Cyprus as part of the deception operations there. In 1942 he re-joined 2nd Camerons in North Africa and was a company commander in their epic stand during the fall of Tobruk in June. He escaped when the commanding officer gave his men permission to scatter; hi-jacking a German lorry, he and his companions had almost reached Allied lines when one of them accidentally shot himself in the leg with a captured Luger, and as they treated the casualty they were overtaken by German troops.

There are memorials to him in Bettola, Albarola, and the Dean Cemetery in Edinburgh.

== Bibliography ==
- Hullis, Shaun (2014). Captains Courageous: Gunner Gregg, Donny Mackenzie & the liberation of the Nure Valley. CreateSpace. ISBN 9781495930614.
