= Archambault (disambiguation) =

Archambault may refer to:

== People with the name ==
- Archambault (surname), includes a list of people with the name

== Places with the name ==
=== France ===
- Bourbon-l'Archambault, spa town and a commune in the Allier department in Auvergne in central France
- Bourg-Archambault, commune of the Vienne département, in France
- Canton of Bourbon-l'Archambault, administrative division in central France

=== Antarctica ===
- Archambault Ridge, Victoria Land, Antarctica

== Miscellaneous ==
- Archambault report, influential study of the penitentiary system in Canada that was tabled in 1938
- Archambault House, historic house in Florissant, Missouri, U.S.
- Archambault (French pronunciation: [aʁʃɑ̃bo]) is a media company in Quebec, Canada

== See also ==
- Archambeault, surname
- Sarh (formally Fort Archambault), capital of Moyen-Chari Region, Chad
