= Archibald Primrose =

Archibald Primrose may refer to:

- Archibald Primrose, 1st Laird of Burnbrae (c.1538–?)
- Archibald Primrose, Lord Carrington (1616–1679), notable Scottish lawyer, judge, and Cavalier
- Archibald Primrose, 2nd Viscount of Primrose (died 1716), Viscount of Primrose
- Archibald Primrose, 1st Earl of Rosebery (1661–1723), Scottish politician
- Archibald Primrose, 4th Earl of Rosebery (1783–1868), British politician
- Archibald Primrose, 5th Earl of Rosebery (1847–1929), Prime Minister of the United Kingdom
- Archibald Primrose, Lord Dalmeny (1809–1851), Scottish Liberal politician

== See also ==
- Earl of Rosebery
