= Jacques Archambault =

French-Canadian settler

- Born: c. 1604; Saint-Xandre, Charente-Maritime, France
- Died: 15 February 1688; Montreal, Canada, New France
- Occupation: Well Digger
- Spouse: Françoise Toureau
- Children: 7

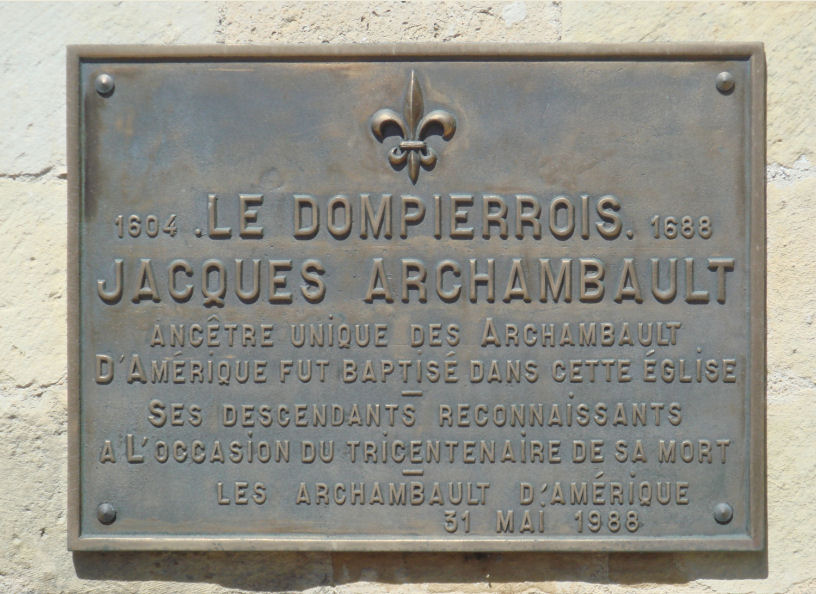
Plaque to Jacques Archambault, Church of Dompierre-sur-Mer.

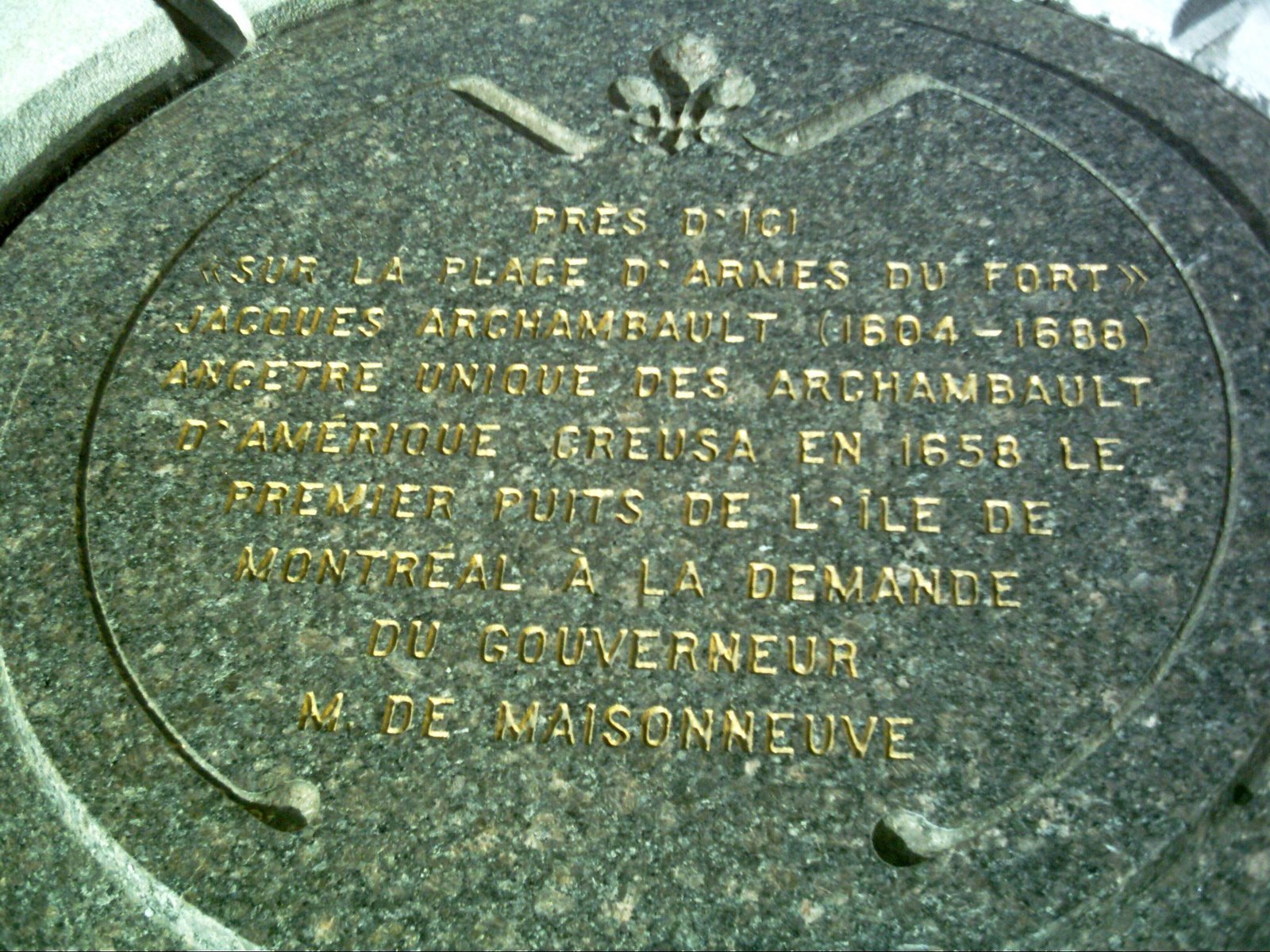
Plaque on the location of the first well dug on the island of Montréal by Jacques Archambault.

Jacques Archambault (c. 1604 – February 15, 1688) was a French colonist in Montreal. He was born in Dompierre-sur-Mer, where he was baptized.

Archambault married (around 1629) Françoise Tourault who from 1630 to 1644, had 2 sons and 5 daughters (one of whom died to infancy). All Archambaults (and descendants) now living in North America are his descendants, as no other Archambault ever emigrated from France.

A plate in the back of the Pointe-à-Callière Museum of Montreal commemorates his digging the first water well, near what is now known as Place-d'Armes, on October 11, 1658, upon request by Paul de Chomedey de Maisonneuve.

== List of children ==
- Madeleine Archambault ou Aubry (1621–?);
- Denis Archambault (1630–1651);
- Anne Archambault (1631–1699);
- Jacquette-Françoise Archambault (1632–1700);
- N.N. Archambault (1634–?);
- Marie Archambault (1636–1719);
- Marie-Anne Archambault (1638–1685);
- Louise Archambault (1640–1640);
- and Laurent Archambault (1642–1730).
