= George Archibald (footballer) =

Australian rules footballer, born 1919

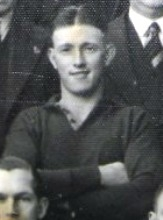

Personal information
- Full name: George Archibald
- Born: 6 October 1919
- Died: 27 January 2006 (aged 86)
- Original team: Tempy
- Height: 183 cm (6 ft 0 in)
- Weight: 83 kg (183 lb)

Playing career^{1}
Years	Club	Games (Goals)
1941–45	Melbourne	47 (5)
- ^{1} Playing statistics correct to the end of 1945.

George Archibald (6 October 1919 – 27 January 2006) was an Australian rules footballer who played with Melbourne in the Victorian Football League (VFL).
