= Archambault House =

Historic house in Florissant, Missouri

- U.S. National Register of Historic Places
- U.S. Historic district – Contributing property
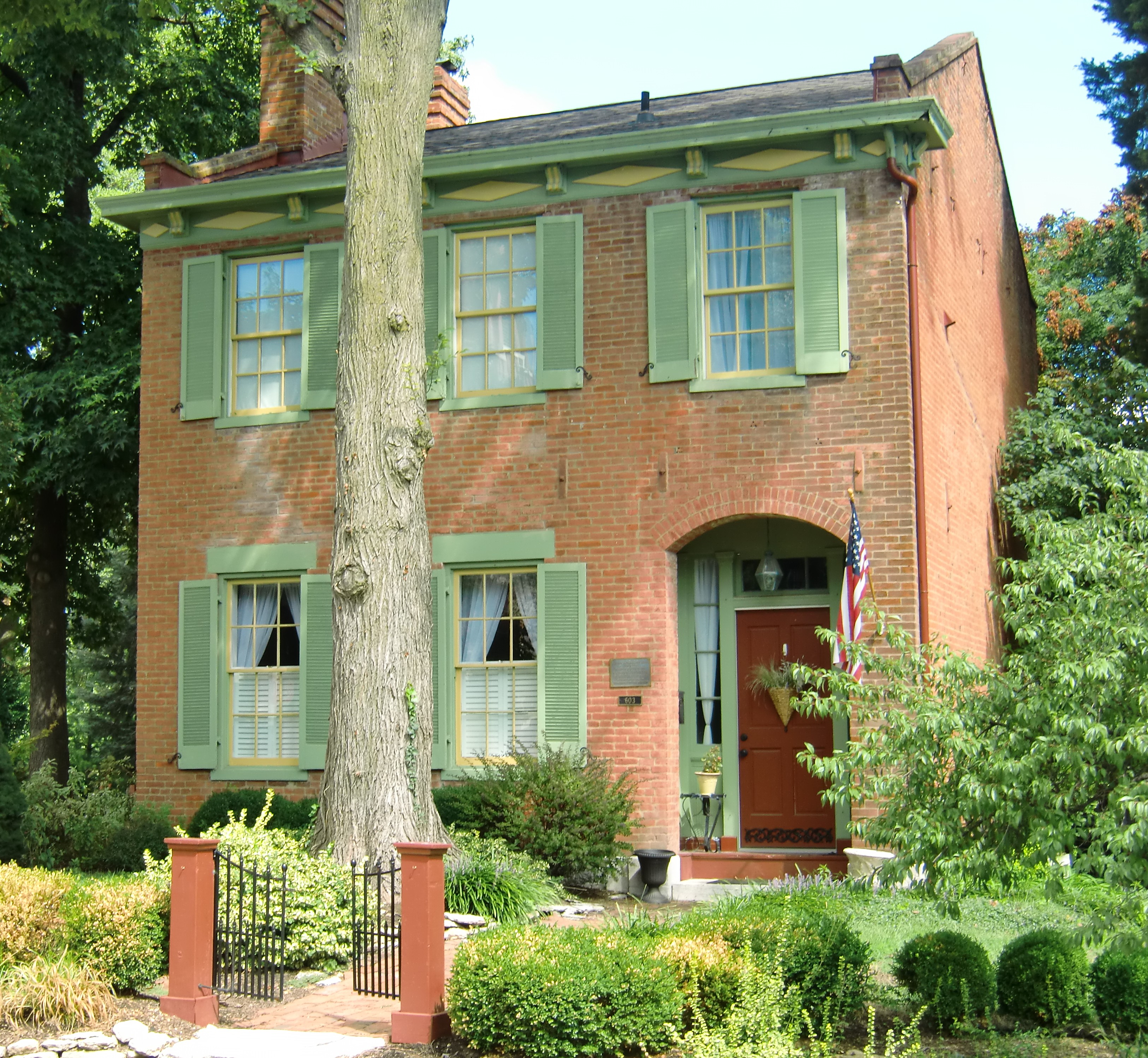
- The Archambault House in 2012

- Location within Missouri Location within the United States
- Location: 603 Rue St. Denis, Florissant, Missouri
- Coordinates: 38°47′43″N 90°19′29″W
- Area: 0.6 acres (0.24 ha)
- Built: 1850
- Architectural style: Federal
- Part of: St. Ferdinand Central Historic District (ID79003647)
- MPS: St. Ferdinand City MRA (AD)
- NRHP reference No.: 76002178

Significant dates
- Added to NRHP: May 13, 1976
- Designated CP: September 12, 1979

The Archambault House is a transitional Federal style house that was built circa 1850 in Florissant, Missouri. It is notable for its intact outbuildings which are some of the finest remaining in Florissant. It was the home of Auguste Archambault, a French-Canadian mountain guide who worked with many other American explorers, traders, and mountain men of the West such as Kit Carson, Jim Bridger, and John C. Frémont. The house is listed on the National Register of Historic Places and is also a St. Louis County Landmark.

== History ==
In 1848, after the Mexican-American War, Auguste Archambault was invited by an acquaintance, Antoine Tesson to come to his hometown of Florissant, Missouri. Archambault had served under Frémont in the California Battalion. While in Florissant was introduced to Amanda Peira, a descendant of an early settler of the town, whom he married later that year. Archambault subsequently left to help guide Howard Stansbury's expedition to the Great Salt Lake in Utah. Upon his arrival back from this expedition he met his firstborn son, Auguste Jr., and began construction of a new house on what was then the Florissant Commons, land held by the village for farming with each village property owner owning individual tracts. The Archambault family never lived in the house for very long periods of time especially due to Auguste's transient career as a fur trader and guide.

In 1858 the land the house was on was transferred to Joseph and Virginia Brand the in-laws of Auguste Archambault Jr. For many years after the house was used a residence before the Archdiocese of St. Louis came into possession of the house. They in turn sold it a year later to the city of Florissant under whose ownership in the 1970s a time when it was threatened with demolition. It was purchased by the city of Florissant with a $20,000 grant from the Department of Housing and Urban Development which was matched by Historic Florissant Inc. As a result of this agreement, in 1981 after the restoration was complete Historic Florissant refunded the grant to the federal government and gained ownership of the house, which is currently a private residence.

== Architecture ==
This two-story Federal style house was built of brick on a limestone foundation. The house itself is a transitional one architecturally featuring Greek Revival and early Victorian features such as the boxed cornice with brackets. The main portion of the house dates from the 1850s while the one-story brick kitchen wing of the house dates from the 1880s. It has a stone cellar underneath the rear kitchen wing of the house with a dirt floor. The most notable feature of the property is that it has five intact outbuildings: a wood-frame summer kitchen, well house, two sheds, and a brick privy. Of these the most significant are the well house and brick privy. Both have French Provincial roofs and the privy has three seats and is plastered on the interior.

The house was listed on the National Register of Historic Places in 1976. It was also included as a contributing building in the 1979 listing of the St. Ferdinand Central Historic District.
