= Timothy Archambault =

American musician and composer

- Born: February 9, 1971 (age 55); Willimantic, Connecticut
- Education: Rhode Island School of Design
- Occupations: architect, composer, musician
- Years active: 1990s–present

Timothy Archambault (born 1971) is an American composer and musician who plays Native American flute. He lives in Miami, Florida.

== Early life and education ==
Timothy Archambault was born on February 9, 1971, in Willimantic, Connecticut.

Archambault is of Kichesipirini Algonquin First Nation and Métis descent.

He graduated with two degrees (bachelor of architecture and bachelor of fine arts) from the Rhode Island School of Design, taking courses in music theory at Brown University during this time.

== Musical career ==
Archambault began playing the Native American flute in 1989 and studied informally with the Native American flutists Kevin Locke (Lakota) and Edmund Wayne Nevaquaya (Comanche), and has collected songs of his Kichesipirini heritage, from elders in Canada as well as from archival wax cylinder recordings made in the early 20th century.

He plays complex chromatic music on the Native American flute. He has performed the music of Native American composers David Yeagley, George Quincy, and Raven Chacon. His recording of Yeagley's Wessi vah-peh, for Native American flute and orchestra, performed with the National Polish Radio Symphony Orchestra Katowice, will be released by Opus One Records in late 2008. He was the first person to use the old warble technique (in which a single flute tone "splits" into a multiphonic oscillation) within the context of contemporary classical music.

Archambault recorded an orchestral work entitled The Choctaw Diaries by the Choctaw composer George Quincy, which was released by Lyrichord Classical on June 17, 2008. In 2008, he joined a Native American orchestra called The Coast Orchestra.

As a composer, in the spring of 2007 he composed a work for solo cello for the Mohawk cellist, as a part of her North American Indian Cello Project; this work, Anoki, was released on CD in late 2008. Archambault is a member of the First Nations Composer Initiative and performed at the National Museum of the American Indian in Washington, D.C. in November 2006. In August 2007, he recorded traditional Kichesipirini flute songs for the National Museum of the American Indian archives, and in 2008 he was one of the First Nations Composer Initiative panelists who awarded several grants to American Indian musicians.

== Architectural career ==
Prior to joining OMA, he worked for Pasanella+Klein Stolzman+Berg Architects in New York on the Pratt Stabile Hall Dormitory, and for Frank O. Gehry and Associates on the Samsung Museum of Contemporary Art and the Walt Disney Concert Hall.
