= Nancy Archibald =

Canadian fencer

Personal information
- Born: 7 December 1911 Montreal, Quebec, Canada
- Died: 28 August 1996 (aged 84) Vancouver, Canada

Sport
- Sport: Fencing

Nancy Archibald (7 December 1911 – 28 August 1996) was a Canadian fencer. She competed in the women's individual foil event at the 1936 Summer Olympics. She was a sister of Joan Archibald and Griselda Archibald.

Married to Werner Joeck, they had four children, Nancy Traina, Susan Stewart (fencer), Ian Joeck, and Neil Joeck.
