= Mihăești, Olt =

Mihăești
- Commune
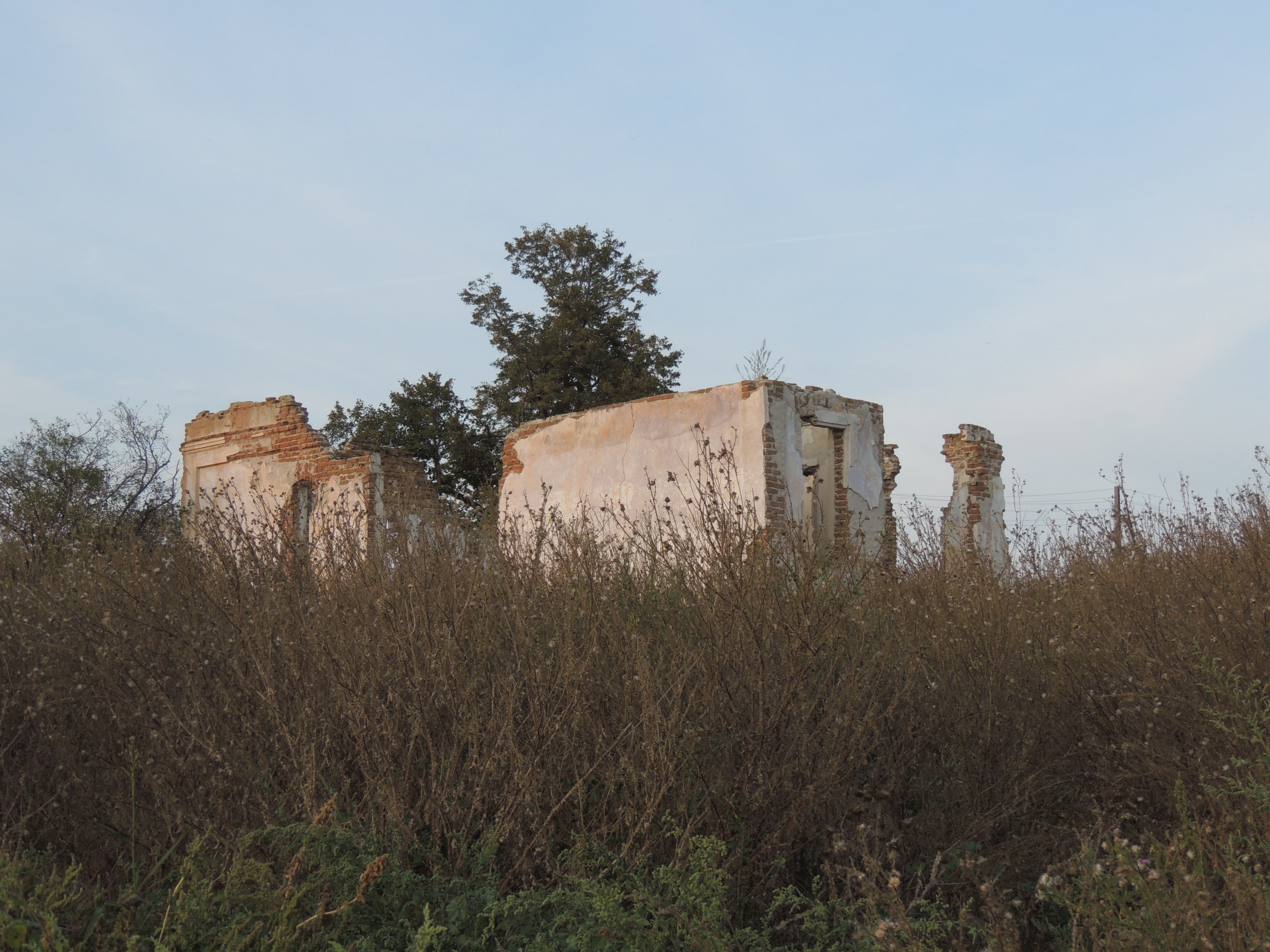
- Ruins of the Pipile Popescu manor in Bușca

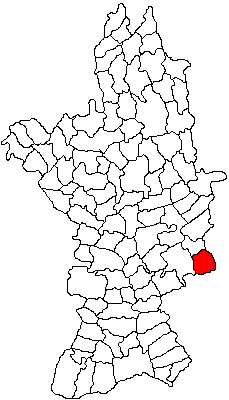
- Location in Olt County

- Location in Romania
- Coordinates: 44°8′N 24°47′E
- Country: Romania
- County: Olt

Government
  - Mayor (2020–2024): Constantin Dobrița (PNL)
- Area: 54.33 km^{2} (20.98 sq mi)
- Elevation: 109 m (358 ft)
- Population (2021-12-01): 1,311
  - Density: 24.13/km^{2} (62.50/sq mi)
- Time zone: UTC+02:00 (EET)
  - Summer (DST): UTC+03:00 (EEST)
- Postal code: 237255
- Area code: +(40) 249
- Vehicle reg.: OT
- Website: www.primariamihaesti.judetulolt.ro

Mihăești is a commune in Olt County, Muntenia, Romania. It is composed of two villages, Bușca and Mihăești.

The Mihăești train station serves the CFR Main Line 900, which connects Bucharest to Timișoara.
