= Sormani =

Sormani is an Italian surname. Notable people with the surname include:

- Angelo Sormani (born 1939), Italian Brazilian footballer and manager
- Christina Sormani, American mathematician
- Gianfrancesco Sormani (died 1601), Italian Roman Catholic bishop
- Leonardo Sormani, Italian sculptor

== See also ==
- Palazzo Sormani, a public library in Milan
