= Joan Archibald =

Canadian fencer (1913–2002)

Personal information
- Born: March 3, 1913 Montreal, Quebec, Canada
- Died: October 28, 2002 (aged 89) Halifax, Nova Scotia, Canada

Sport
- Sport: Fencing

Helen Joan Riddell, née Archibald (March 3, 1913 – October 28, 2002) was a Canadian fencer. She competed in the women's individual foil event at the 1932 Summer Olympics.

== Biography ==
Joan Helen Archibald was born in Montreal, Quebec. Her parents were Dr. Edward William Archibald and Agnes Barron, and she had two sisters: Margaret and Nancy.

Archibald trained in fencing, and began winning titles in both provincial and national competitions. In 1932, she became the first female Canadian Olympic fencer, representing Canada at the 1932 Los Angeles Olympics.

Riddell died on October 28, 2002, in Halifax, Nova Scotia.
