= JoAllyn Archambault =

Cultural anthropologist

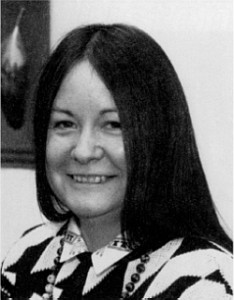
- Born: 1942 (age 83–84); Oklahoma
- Education: UC Berkeley
- Occupation: Anthropologist

JoAllyn Archambault (born 1942) is a cultural anthropologist with an expertise in Native American people. She is the director of the Smithsonian Institution's American Indian Program. Born to a Sioux father and Creek mother, Archambault was raised in Sioux traditions and is a member of the Standing Rock Sioux Tribe of North and South Dakota. Archambault has made a great contribution to anthropology by providing an insider's perspective to her research on Native American people.

== Education and teaching ==
She attended the University of California, Berkeley for her entire education, earning her Bachelor of Arts in 1970, her Master of Arts in 1974, and her anthropology Ph.D. in 1984. The research for her doctorate focused on the Gallup ceremonial, an annual tourist event held in Gallup, New Mexico to display the Native American arts of that region.

== Career ==
Archambault has devoted her life to teaching, researching, and administering programs relating to North American studies. She has taught classes in Native American studies at numerous colleges and universities including: Pine Ridge Tribal College (Pine Ridge Reservation, South Dakota); University of California, Berkeley; the University of New Mexico; and Johns Hopkins University. Her research interests focus on several urban and reservation communities in specific areas including reservation land use, health evaluation, expressive art, material culture, contemporary native culture, and the sun dance ceremony of eight different Plains groups.

Archambault worked as a Professor at the University of Wisconsin in the Department of Anthropology (1983–86). She also worked as the Director of Ethnic studies at the California College of Arts and Crafts in Oakland, California (1978–83).

Now retired, she worked for the Smithsonian Institution as the Director of the American Indian program of the National Museum of Natural History in Washington, DC. Archambault began working there in 1986. Some of her responsibilities at the museum included preserving and promoting Native American art, culture, and political anthropology. She also acted as an ethnic liaison, supervised Native American fellowship interns, and managed a $110,000 annual program budget.

== Professional memberships ==
- American Ethnological Society
- Commission on Native American Reburial of the American Anthropological Association
- University of California Joint Academic Senate-Administration Committee on Human Skeletal Remains
- American Association of Anthropology
- National Anthropologists Association

== Exhibits ==
Archambault was responsible for the redesign of the North American Indian Ethnology Halls for the “Changing Culture in a Changing World” exhibit. She has also curated four major exhibits: “Plains Indian Arts: Change and Continuity” (1987), “100 Years of Plains Indian Painting” (1989), “Indian Basketry and Their Makers” (1990), and “Seminole!” (1990). She also contributed to the Los Angeles Southwest Museum's quincentennial exhibit “Grand-father, Heart our voices” in 1992.

== Works ==
- Traditional Arts (1980)
- Dur Samedi pour Lili (2000)
- Waiting for Winston Elkhart (2013)
