= Archibald Ramsay Douglas =

Scottish miniature painter (1807–1886)

- Born: 23 April 1807; Edinburgh, Scotland
- Died: 23 December 1886 (aged 79); Edinburgh
- Citizenship: United Kingdom
- Known for: miniature painting
- Parent: William Douglas

Miss Archibald Ramsay Douglas (23 April 1807 – 23 December 1886) was a Scottish miniature painter. She was the daughter of William Douglas.

== Life ==
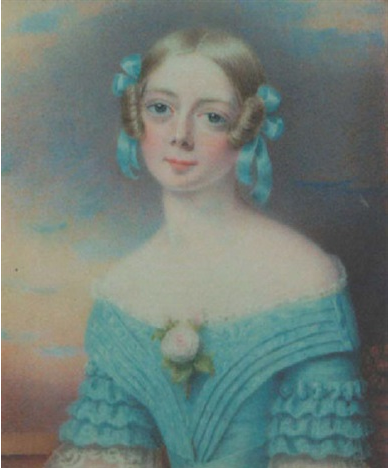
Woman in Dress (1886)

Douglas was born in Edinburgh to William Douglas and his wife in 1807. She was the eldest of three children. Her father was the miniature painter in Scotland employed by Prince Leopold of Saxe-Coburg-Saalfeld.

Douglas was taught to paint by her father and opened studios in Hart Street in Edinburgh. Douglas exhibited four paintings at the Royal Academy in London and nine at the Royal Scottish Academy from 1834 to 1847.

Douglas died in Edinburgh in 1886.
