= Archibald Napier =

Archibald Napier may refer to:

- Sir Archibald Napier (landowner) (1534–1608), Scottish landowner and official, master of the Scottish mint and Laird of Merchiston
- Archibald Napier, 1st Lord Napier (c. 1576–1645)
- Archibald Napier, 2nd Lord Napier (c. 1625–1660)
- Archibald Napier, 3rd Lord Napier (died 1683)
