= Gilles Archambault (Canadian football) =

Canadian football player (1934–2009)

Profile
- Positions: Guard, Tackle

Personal information
- Born: March 9, 1934; Richelieu, Quebec, Canada
- Died: October 25, 2009 (aged 75); Gatineau, Quebec, Canada
- Listed height: 6 ft 2 in (1.88 m)
- Listed weight: 245 lb (111 kg)

Career information
- University: Ottawa

Career history
- 1954–1957: Calgary Stampeders
- 1957–1963: Ottawa Rough Riders

Awards and highlights
- Grey Cup champion (1960)

Gilles Archambault (March 9, 1934 – October 25, 2009) was a professional Canadian football player who played for the Calgary Stampeders and Ottawa Rough Riders. He played junior football previously in Ottawa and in Verdun, Quebec.
