= Phyllis Archibald =

British artist

- Born: Phyllis Muriel Cowan Archibald; 1880; Tunbridge Wells, England
- Died: 1947 (aged 66–67); Grasmere, England
- Education: Glasgow School of Art
- Known for: Sculpture
- Spouse: Charles Clay m.1911-1941, his death

Phyllis Muriel Cowan Archibald (1880 – 9 March 1947), later Phyllis Archibald Clay, was a British sculptor. Archibald was an Associate member of the Royal Society of British Sculptors from 1923, and member of the Glasgow Society of Lady Artists.

== Biography ==
Phyllis Archibald was born in Tunbridge Wells. Her father, Edmund Douglas Archibald, 1851–1913, was a meteorologist and a Professor of Mathematics and by 1891 the family were living in her mother's native Scotland. Phyllis Archibald was educated at the Park School in Glasgow and then studied at the Glasgow School of Art from 1903 to 1906 before spending several years studying sculpture in Paris. Before World War I began, Archibald moved to London where she established herself as a sculptor of animals and portrait figures, working in wood, stone and with a variety of metals. In 1911 Archibald married the journalist Charles Clay, 1856–1941, and the couple lived at Hampstead in London then at Bletchingley in Surrey before, as a widow, she moved to Grasmere where she died in 1947.

== Awards and exhibitions ==
Archibald was a prolific exhibitor of her art, most notably with the Royal Scottish Academy, the Royal Glasgow Institute of the Fine Arts, and the Glasgow Society of Lady Artists. Outside of Scotland, Archibald exhibited works at the Royal Academy and with the International Society of Sculptors, Painters and Gravers in London, at the Walker Art Gallery in Liverpool, and at the Paris Salon.

Between 1927 and 1937 Archibald had twelve works included in exhibitions of the Society of Women Artists. During 1906 and 1907, Archibald created a set of four stone sculptures of allegorical female figures for the facade of the Royal Bank of Scotland building in St Enoch Square in Glasgow. Elsewhere in Glasgow, she sculpted a figure representing Science & Industry for a warehouse entrance in West Campbell Street. Archibald completed a number of works for charities and churches, notably figures for choir stall of the Congregational Church at Whitchurch in 1910. At least one piece by her was included in the 1924 British Empire Exhibition in London.

== Selected works ==
Title	Date (if known)	Medium (if known)
'We remembered Zion'	1910	Marble
'Jocund day stands tiptoe on the misty mountain tops' ~ Shakespeare Romeo and Juliet	1916	Plaster
'The Foolish Virgins'	1917	Plaster
'The Pillar of Salt'	1915, 1917, 1919	Plaster, bronze
'Winnie'	1918	Plaster
'The Moon'	1923	Sculpture
'Head of a Boy'	1908	Stone
'Portrait of the Late Lady Archibald'	1903	Sculpture
'Model of 'Charity' for Trinity Church Convalescent Home'	1908	Bronze
'Adam and Eve'		Sculpture
'Fred'	1915	Bronze, marble
'David Dancing before the Ark of the Lord'	1923	Bronze, plaster
'Spring'	1929	Bronze
'Eve'	1931	Wood (pear).
