= Archibald Cameron (sailor) =

Canadian sailor (1919–1987)

Archibald F. Cameron (16 October 1919 – 12 January 1987) was a Canadian sailor who competed in the 1956 Summer Olympics. He was born in Montreal and died in Lancaster, Ontario.
