= Théophile Archambault =

French psychiatrist

Théophile Archambault (French pronunciation: [teɔfil aʁʃɑ̃bo]; 19 February 1806 – 12 December 1863) was a French psychiatrist who was a native of Tours.

He studied in Angers and Paris, where he later worked under psychiatrist Jean-Étienne Dominique Esquirol (1772–1840) in an informal capacity. In 1840 he became assistant to François Leuret (1797–1851) at the Bicêtre hospital, and soon afterwards was tasked with re-organization of the Maréville asylum in Nancy. He spent seven years at Nancy, where he also gave classes on mental pathology at the school of medicine. In 1848 he succeeded Achille-Louis Foville (1799–1878) at the Charenton mental hospital.

== Written works ==
Archambault spoke fluent English, and in 1840 translated William Charles Ellis' "Treatise on the Nature, Causes, Symptoms and Treatment of Insanity" into French. Other publications by Archambault include:

- Rapport à M. le préfet de la Meurthe sur le service médical de l'asile d'aliénées de Maréville pendant l'année 1842 (1843)
- Bibliothèque de médecine mentale (1850)

== Bibliography ==
- Psicologia – RedePsi PsiPédia (translated from Portuguese)
