= Arch Hamilton =

Australian rules footballer, born 1915

Archibald ‘Rompy’ Hamilton

Personal information
- Full name: Archibald William Hamilton
- Born: 18 November 1915; Macarthur, Victoria
- Died: 12 May 1999 (aged 83); Hamilton, Victoria
- Height: 180 cm (5 ft 11 in)
- Weight: 86 kg (190 lb)

Playing career^{1}
Years	Club	Games (Goals)
1942	North Melbourne	1 (0)
- ^{1} Playing statistics correct to the end of 1942.

Archibald William Hamilton (18 November 1915 – 12 May 1999) was an Australian rules footballer who played for the North Melbourne Football Club in the Victorian Football League (VFL).
