= Maurice Archambault =

Canadian lawyer and judge

Maurice Archambault, QC (5 April 1914 – 9 June 2002) was a Canadian lawyer and judge.

Born in Saint-Hyacinthe, Quebec, the son of Sylvani Archambault and Emma Beaudry, Maurice attended the Seminary of Saint-Hyacinthe from 1929 to 1935. Later, he graduated from the Faculty of Law at the Université de Montréal.

== Career highlights ==
- 1938 - Admitted to the Bar of Quebec; held a legal practice in Farnham, Quebec until 1962
- 1950 - Named to the Queen's Counsel of Law; Served as Crown Attorney for the district of Bedford until 1960
- 1962 - Became a judge of the Superior Court of Montreal

== Service and memberships ==
At the Bar of Bedford, Maurice served as secretary, syndic, and barrister's president. Memberships include General Council of the Bar of Québec and the committee of the Inspectors of the Bar. He also served as the chair of the Association of the Rural Bar.
