= Archie Hamilton (DJ) =

DJ, proder and label owner

- Origin: London, England
- Genres: Techno; House; deep house; tech house; minimal
- Occupation(s): Musician, producer, disc jockey
- Labels: Moscow Records; Moss Co.; Arkityp; FUSE

Archie Hamilton is a DJ, producer and label owner based in London. He has released on labels such as Fear of Flying, Fasten Musique Concrete and his own imprints Moscow Records, Moss Co. & Arkityp.

== Early career ==
In 2008 Hamilton graduated from Oxford Brookes University with a degree in Marketing Management. Following this he completed an introductory production course at Point Blank Music School. His tutor was Chad Jackson, who wrote the 90's hit “Hear The Drummer (Get Wicked)." Here he learned the basics of sequencing. After moving to London at the age of 18, Hamilton started as a regular partygoer to several London venues whilst producing tracks in his bedroom. Eventually his work was noticed by the DJs playing at FUSE, a Sunday party held at the Shoreditch club, 93 Feet East. This led to him being asked to play there for the first time in 2013 and eventually becoming a resident.

== Record labels ==
=== Moscow Records ===
Moscow Records was started in December 2009 as a platform for Hamilton to release his own music. The labels first release was called ‘Introductions EP Part 1’ featuring tracks from Archie himself, Keinton & Alexqbit. This was the first in a series of EPs released focused on showcasing up and coming producers. Since then artists such as Enzo Siragusa, 100 Hz and Benson Herbert have released on the label.

=== Moss Co. ===
Established in 2013 Moss Co. was started as a new creative venture releasing more experimental music than Moscow Records. Its inception was the result of Moscow's distributor almost going into administration and the cost of pressing vinyl being too high to continue. Releases on Moss Co. have been charted by Maher Daniel, Julie Marghilano, Enzo Siragusa & Archie Hamilton.

== Present day ==
In 2015 Hamilton released the commercially successful singles ‘Mind Blank’ and ‘Works On Sunday’ on FUSE. The summer saw the launch of a new project, ‘Arkityp’ with fellow FUSE London resident, Rossko, hosting five events in the summer season at Ibiza's Underground Club. Arkityp was continued as a label reserved for collaborations by Hamilton & Rossko. That year he also played at the Sonus festival in Croatia, at Gottwood and OFF Sonar.

He has played at clubs in Australia, Asia and North and South America.
