= Archambeault =

Archambeault is a surname. Notable people with the name include:

- Sir Horace Archambeault (1857–1918), Canadian politician and judge from Quebec
- Joseph-Alfred Archambeault (1859–1913) Canadian Roman Catholic bishop
- Larry Archambeault (1919–1981), Canadian ice hockey player
- Louis Archambeault (1814–1890), Canadian politician and notary from Quebec

== See also ==
- Archambault (disambiguation)
