= Cardinals created by Julius III =

Catholic appointments from 1550 to 1553

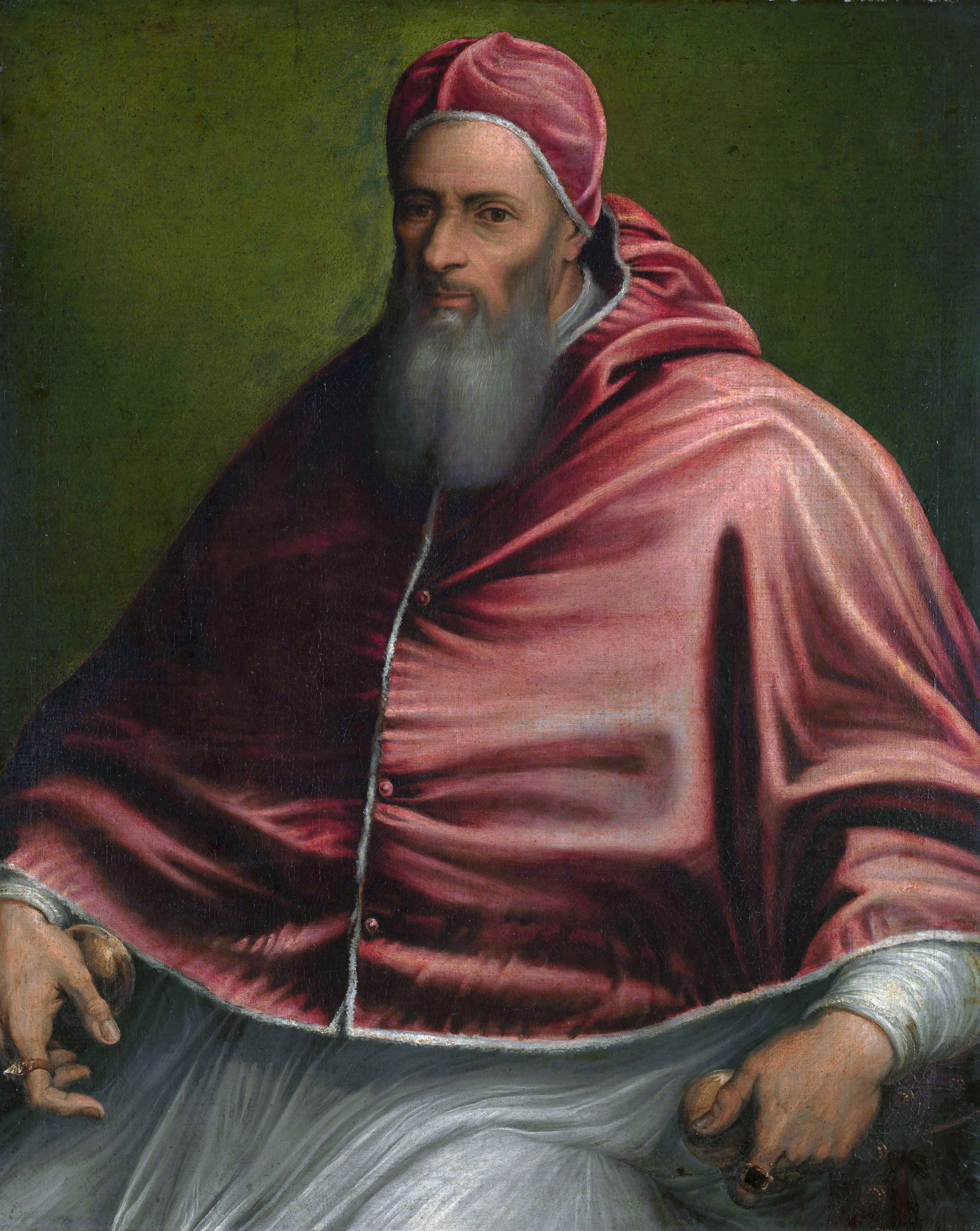
Pope Julius III (1487–1555).

Pope Julius III (r. 1550–1555) created twenty new cardinals in four consistories:

== 30 May 1550 ==
1. Innocenzo Ciocchi del Monte, adopted nephew of the Pope – cardinal-deacon of S. Onofrio (received the title on 1 September 1550), then cardinal-deacon of S. Callisto (4 May 1562), cardinal-deacon of S. Maria in Portico (17 November 1564), cardinal-deacon of S. Maria in Via Lata (3 December 1568), † 3 November 1577

== 12 October 1550 ==
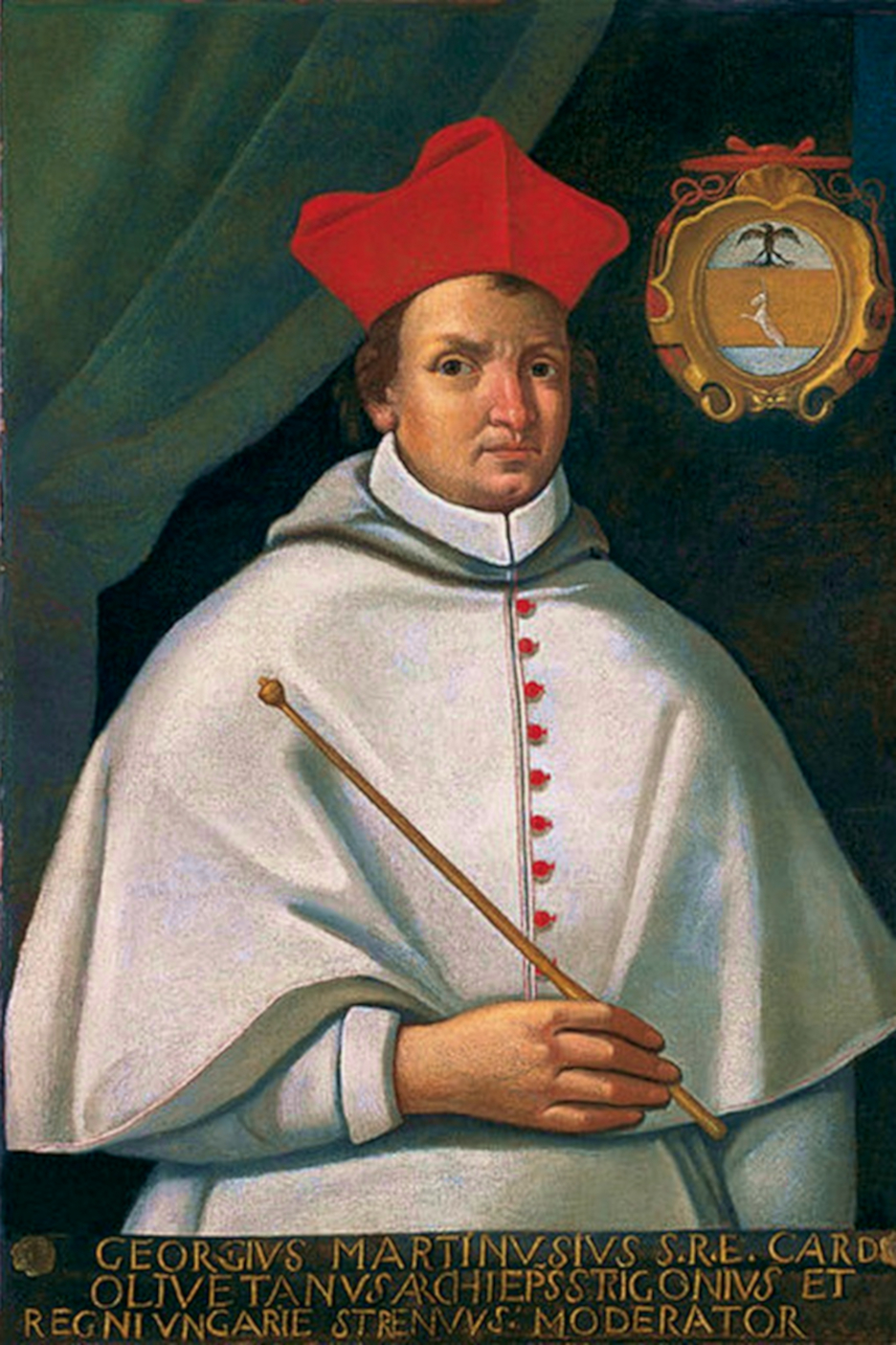
George Martinuzzi (1482–1551), made a cardinal on October 12, 1550.

1. George Martinuzzi, O.S.P.P.E., bishop of Nagy Várad – cardinal-priest without the title, † 17 December 1550

== 20 November 1551 ==
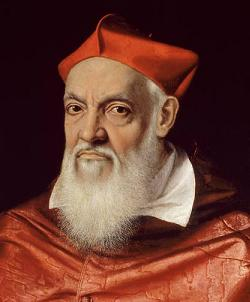
Giovanni Ricci (1498–1574), made a cardinal on November 20, 1551.

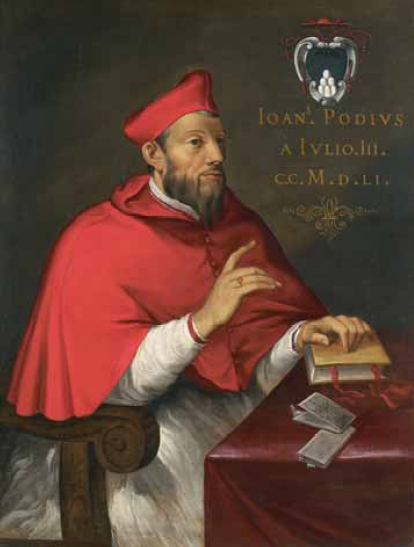
Giovanni Poggio (1493–1556), made a cardinal on November 20, 1551.

1. Cristoforo Guidalotti Ciocchi del Monte, relative of the Pope, bishop of Marseille – cardinal-priest of S. Prassede (received the title on 4 December 1551), † 27 October 1564
2. Fulvio Giulio della Corgna, O.S.Io.Hieros., bishop of Perugia – cardinal-priest of S. Maria in Via (received the title on 4 December 1551), then cardinal-priest of S. Bartolomeo (29 May 1555), cardinal-priest of S. Stefano al Monte Celio (20 September 1557), cardinal-priest of S. Agata alla Suburra (18 May 1562), cardinal-priest of S. Angelo in Pescheria (7 February 1565), cardinal-priest of S. Lorenzo in Lucina (30 January 1566), cardinal-priest of S. Adriano (3 March 1567), cardinal-bishop of Albano (5 May 1574), cardinal-bishop of Porto e S. Rufina (5 December 1580), † 4 March 1583
3. Giovanni Michele Saraceni, archbishop of Matera – cardinal-priest of S. Maria in Aracoeli (received the title on 4 December 1551), then cardinal-priest of S. Anastasia (24 March 1557), cardinal-priest of S. Agata in Suburra (7 February 1565), cardinal-priest of S. Maria in Trastevere (7 November 1565), cardinal-bishop of Sabina (7 October 1566), † 27 April 1568
4. Giovanni Ricci, bishop of Chiusi – cardinal-priest of S. Vitale (received the title on 4 December 1551), then cardinal-priest of S. Angelo in Pescheria (30 January 1566), cardinal-priest of S. Maria in Trastevere (7 October 1566), cardinal-bishop of Albano (3 July 1570), cardinal-bishop of Sabina (8 April 1573), † 3 May 1574
5. Giovanni Andrea Mercurio, archbishop of Messina – cardinal-priest of S. Barbara (received the title on 4 December 1551), then cardinal-priest of S. Ciriaco (18 August 1553), cardinal-priest of S. Marcello (19 January 1560) † 2 February 1561
6. Giacomo Puteo, archbishop of Bari – cardinal-priest of S. Simeone (received the title on 4 December 1551), then cardinal-priest of S. Maria in Via (29 May 1555), † 26 April 1563
7. Alessandro Campeggio, bishop of Bologna – cardinal-priest of S. Lucia in Silice (received the title on 4 December 1551), † 21 September 1554
8. Pietro Bertani, O.P., bishop of Fano – cardinal-priest of SS. Marcellino e Pietro (received the title on 4 December 1551), † 8 March 1558
9. Fabio Mignanelli, bishop of Grosseto – cardinal-priest of S. Silvestro in Capite (received the title on 4 December 1551), then cardinal-priest of SS. Giovanni e Paolo (12 June 1556), † 10 August 1557
10. Giovanni Poggio, bishop of Tropea – cardinal-priest of S. Anastasia (received the title on 23 March 1552), † 12 February 1556
11. Giovanni Battista Cicala, bishop of Albenga – cardinal-priest of S. Clemente (received the title on 4 December 1551), then cardinal-priest of S. Agata in Suburra (7 November 1565), cardinal-bishop of Sabina (30 April 1568), † 7 April 1570
12. Girolamo Dandini, bishop of Imoli – cardinal-priest of S. Matteo in Merulana (received the title on 4 December 1551), then cardinal-priest of S. Marcello (25 October 1555), † 4 December 1559
13. Luigi Cornaro, O.S.Io.Hieros. – cardinal-deacon of S. Teodoro (received the title on 4 December 1551), then cardinal-priest of S. Teodoro (26 February 1561), cardinal-priest of S. Marco (21 June 1564), cardinal-priest of S. Vitale (2 June 1568), cardinal-priest of S. Clemente (9 February 1569), cardinal-priest of S. Marco (9 June 1570), † 10 May 1584
14. Sebastiano Antonio Pighini, archbishop of Manfredonia (created in pectore, published on 30 May 1552) – cardinal-priest of S. Callisto (received the title on 27 June 1552) † 23 November 1553

== 23 December 1553 ==
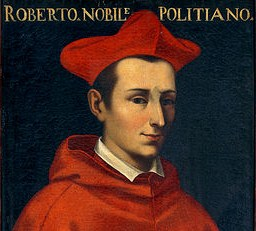
Roberto de' Nobili (1541–1559), made a cardinal on December 23, 1553.

1. Pietro Tagliavia d'Aragonia, archbishop of Palermo – cardinal-priest of S. Callisto (received the title on 17 July 1555). † 5 August 1558
2. Louis I de Guise, bishop of Alby – cardinal-deacon of S. Tommaso in Parione (received the title on 17 July 1555), then cardinal-priest of S. Tommaso in Parione (24 March 1568), † 28 March 1578
3. Roberto de' Nobili, relative of the Pope – cardinal-deacon of S. Maria in Domnica (received the title on 6 February 1555), † 18 January 1559
4. Girolamo Simoncelli, relative of the Pope – cardinal-deacon of SS. Cosma e Damiano (received the title on 5 December 1554), then cardinal-priest of SS. Cosma e Damiano (ca. 1575?), cardinal-priest of S. Prisca (15 January 1588), cardinal-priest of S. Maria in Trastevere (30 March 1598), cardinal-bishop of Albano (21 February 1600), cardinal-bishop of Frascati (24 April 1600), cardinal-bishop of Porto e S. Rufina (16 June 1603), † 22 February 1605

== Sources ==
- Miranda, Salvador. "Consistories for the creation of Cardinals, 16th Century (1503-1605): Julius III (1550-1555)". The Cardinals of the Holy Roman Church. Florida International University. OCLC 53276621.
- Konrad Eubel, Hierarchia Catholica, Vol. III, Münster 1923
