= Fulvio Giulio della Corgna =

16th-century Catholic cardinal

His Eminence Fulvio Giulio della Corgna
- Cardinal-Bishop of Porto e Santa Rufina
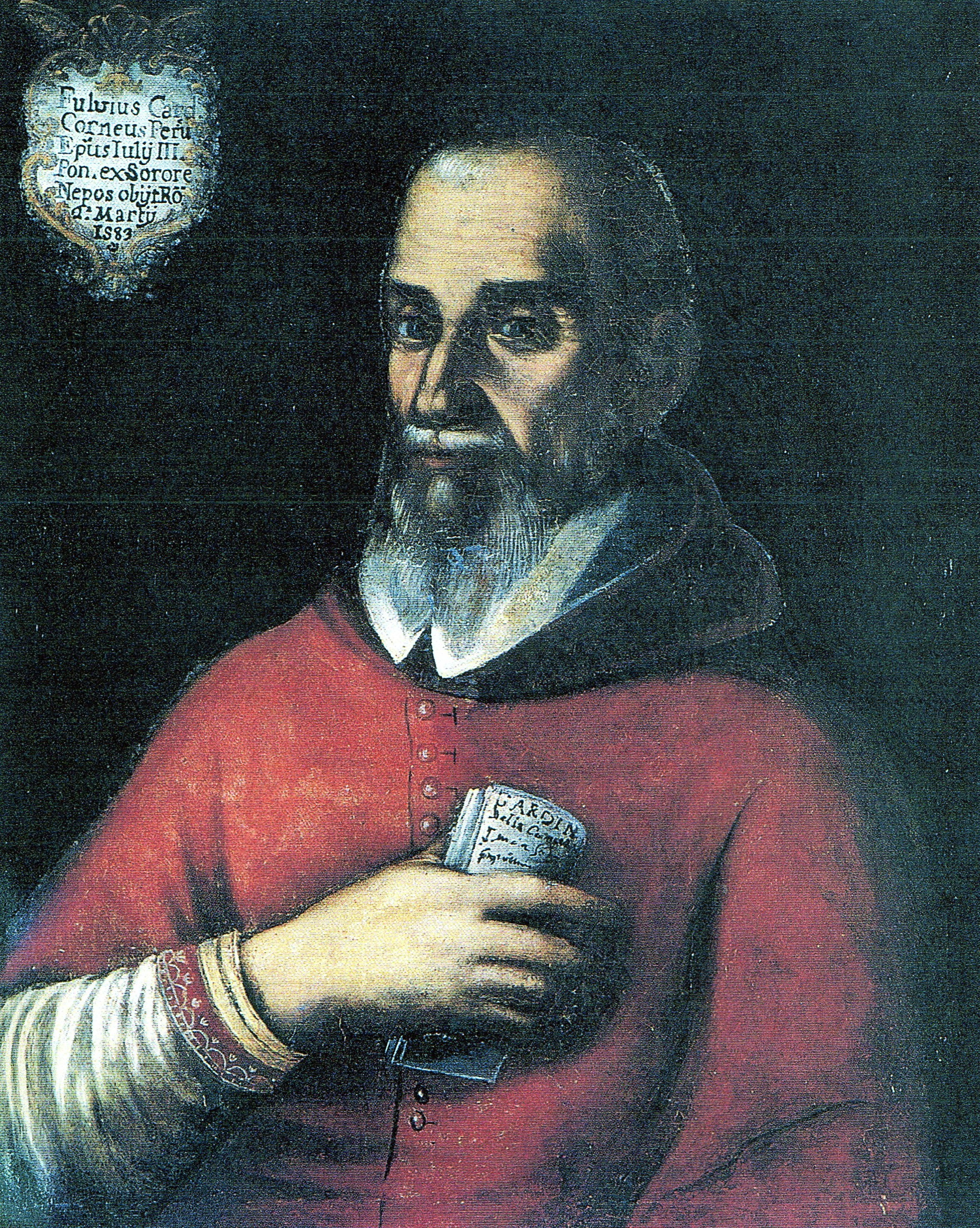
- Church: Catholic Church

Personal details
- Born: 19 November 1517 Perugia, Italy
- Died: 2 March 1583 (aged 65) Rome, Italy

Fulvio Giulio della Corgna (also Della Cornia, Della Corgnia) (19 November 1517 – 2 March 1583) was a Tuscan Catholic bishop and cardinal.

== Biography ==
Fulvio Giulio della Corgna was born in Perugia on 19 November 1517, the son of Francia della Corgna, a Perugian nobleman who bore the title of Duca di Corgna, and Jacopa Ciocchi del Monte. He had a brother, Ascanio, who became an important commander of papal armies and Duca della Corgna. His mother was the sister of Pope Julius III and niece of Cardinal Antonio Maria Ciocchi del Monte. The family owned the Marchesato di Castiglione del Lago on Lake Bolsena. Fulvio was a Marchese della Corgna.

He joined the Knights Hospitaller at an early age, taking the religious name "Giulio" in honour of his family's benefactor, Pope Julius II. He entered the court of his uncle, Cardinal Giovanni Maria Ciocchi del Monte, the future Pope Julius III. He was named a Protonotary Apostolic, as well as Archpriest of the Cathedral of S. Lorenzo of Perugia.

On 5 March 1550, he was appointed Bishop of Perugia by his uncle Pope Julius III. He became Papal Legate of Ascolo-Piceno, Reate and Monteleone di Spoleto on 15 December 1550. It was Fulvio della Corgna who was responsible for the founding of the seminary in Perugia and for inviting the Jesuits to the city to establish a college, the first Rector of which was Everard de Mercœur (Mercurian).

=== Cardinal ===
Pope Julius III made him a cardinal priest in the consistory of 20 November 1551. He received the red hat and the titular church of Santa Maria in Via Lata on 4 December 1551.

In 1553, Cosimo de' Medici, Duke of Florence, fearing that the fighting in Tuscany might expand into a larger war between the Empire (Charles V) and France (Henri II), which would be severely damaging to his territories, urgently requested the Pope to send negotiators to work out an understanding. Julius sent Cardinal Fulvio della Corgna to Florence and Cardinal Niccolò Caetani de Sermoneta to Siena. When nothing came of their efforts, Pope Julius III himself travelled to Viterbo. On 2 August, the French, who had invaded Tuscany under Marshal Blaise de Montluc, were defeated at the Battle of Marciano and forced to retreat into Siena, where they fomented a coup-d-état in their own interests. But the fact that Vercelli had recently fallen to Marshal de Brissac and the Duke of Savoy had been killed (16 August) gave the French, enjoying one success after another, the courage to decline to settle. The Tuscan War was just beginning. Duke Cosimo of Florence requested that Cardinal della Corgna be named administrator of Spoleto to quell disturbances that had broken out there; on 22 March 1553, therefore, the Cardinal resigned the government of Perugia to become Administrator of Spoleto, on the appointment of Pope Julius III. His seat in Perugia was taken by his nephew, Ippolito della Corgna.

=== Conclave of 1555 ===
He was a participant in both the papal conclave of April 1555 that elected Pope Marcellus II (Marcello Cervini), and the papal conclave of May 1555 that elected Pope Paul IV (Gian Pietro Carafa). Pope Paul IV deprived him of the administration of Spoleto in 1555, in favour of Cardinal Alessandro Farnese, one of Carafa's friends, who had administered the diocese of Spoleto under his uncle Paul III in the 1540s. When the pope learned that Cardinal della Corgna had warned his brother Ascanio della Corgna of the pope's orders to arrest him for illicitly entering into communications with Philip II of Spain, the pope had the cardinal arrested on his way to the consistory of 27 July 1556. He was imprisoned in the Castel Sant'Angelo. Following Spanish victories, the pope was forced to moderate his position and ordered the cardinal released and restored to his cardinalate duties, though the cardinal was still fined 60,000 scudi.

On 20 September 1557 he opted for the titular church of Santo Stefano Rotondo. He participated in the papal conclave of 1559 that elected Pope Pius IV. In 1560, the new pope made him governor of Città della Pieve. He served as the Camerlengo of the Sacred College of Cardinals from 15 January 1561 until 9 January 1562. On 18 May 1562 he opted for the titular church of Sant'Agata dei Goti, a deaconry raised temporarily to the status of titulus. He was assigned to the Diocese of Perugia for a second time on 6 September 1564. His Vicar-General was Donato Torri. It was at this time that he founded the seminary in Perugia. On 7 February 1565 he opted for Sant'Angelo in Pescheria, another deaconry assigned as titulus, on 7 February 1565.

=== Conclaves of 1565-1566 and 1572 ===
He participated in the papal conclave of 1565-66 that elected Pope Pius IV. On 30 January 1566 he opted for the titular church of San Lorenzo in Lucina, and then, on 3 March 1567, for Sant'Adriano al Foro, another deaconry assigned as titulus.

He participated in the papal conclave of 1572 that elected Pope Gregory XIII. As the most senior cardinal-priest residing in the Roman Curia, he opted for the order of cardinal bishops on 5 May 1574, taking the suburbicarian Diocese of Albano. Because of the new decrees of the Council of Trent forbidding pluralism, he resigned the government of Perugia at this time. Nonetheless, he generously provisioned the many pilgrims who were coming from Perugia to participate in the Jubilee of 1575. On 5 December 1580 Cardinal della Corgna opted for the suburbicarian Diocese of Porto-Santa Rufina. During this period, he was Sub-Dean of the College of Cardinals.

=== Death ===
Cardinal Fulvio della Corgna died in Rome on 2 March 1583, at the age of 65. He was buried in the Del Monte Chapel in the Church of San Pietro in Montorio.

== Episcopal succession ==
While bishop, he was the principal consecrator of Girolamo Simoncelli, Bishop of Orvieto (1573) and Ottavio Santacroce, Bishop of Cervia (1576).

Catholic Church titles
Preceded by Francesco Bernardino Simonetta	Bishop of Perugia (1st time); 1550–1553	Succeeded by Ippolito della Corgna
Preceded by	Cardinal-Priest of Santa Maria in Via; 1551–1555	Succeeded by Giacomo Puteo
Preceded by Fabio Vigili	Administrator of Spoleto; 1553–1555	Succeeded by Alessandro Farnese (iuniore)
Preceded by Bartolomé de la Cueva y Toledo	Cardinal-Priest of San Bartolomeo all'Isola; 1555–1557	Succeeded by Antoine Perrenot de Granvella
Preceded by Giovanni Angelo de' Medici	Cardinal-Priest of Santo Stefano al Monte Celio; 1557–1562	Succeeded by Girolamo di Corregio
Preceded by Tiberio Crispi	Cardinal-Priest of Sant'Agata de' Goti; 1562–1565	Succeeded by Giovanni Michele Saraceni
Preceded by Giulio Oradini	Bishop of Perugia (2nd time); 1564–1574	Succeeded by Francesco Bossi
Preceded by Ranuccio Farnese	Cardinal-Priest of Sant'Angelo in Pescheria; 1565–1566	Succeeded by Giovanni Ricci
Preceded by Francesco Gonzaga	Cardinal-Priest of San Lorenzo in Lucina; 1566–1567	Succeeded by Iñigo Avalos de Aragón
Preceded by Iñigo Avalos de Aragón	Cardinal-Priest of Sant'Adriano al Foro; 1567–1574	Succeeded by Prospero Publicola Santacroce
Preceded by Scipione Rebiba	Cardinal-Bishop of Albano; 1574–1580	Succeeded by Giovanni Francesco Gàmbara
Preceded by Alessandro Farnese (iuniore)	Cardinal-Bishop of Porto e Santa Rufina; 1580–1583	Succeeded by Giacomo Savelli
