= April 1555 conclave =

Election of Catholic Pope Marcellus II

Papal conclave April 1555

Dates and location
- 5–9 April 1555; Apostolic Palace, Papal States

Key officials
- Dean: Gian Pietro Carafa
- Camerlengo: Guido Ascanio Sforza
- Protopriest: Robert de Lenoncourt
- Protodeacon: Francesco Pisani

Election
- Ballots: 1

Elected pope
- Marcello Cervini; Name taken: Marcellus II
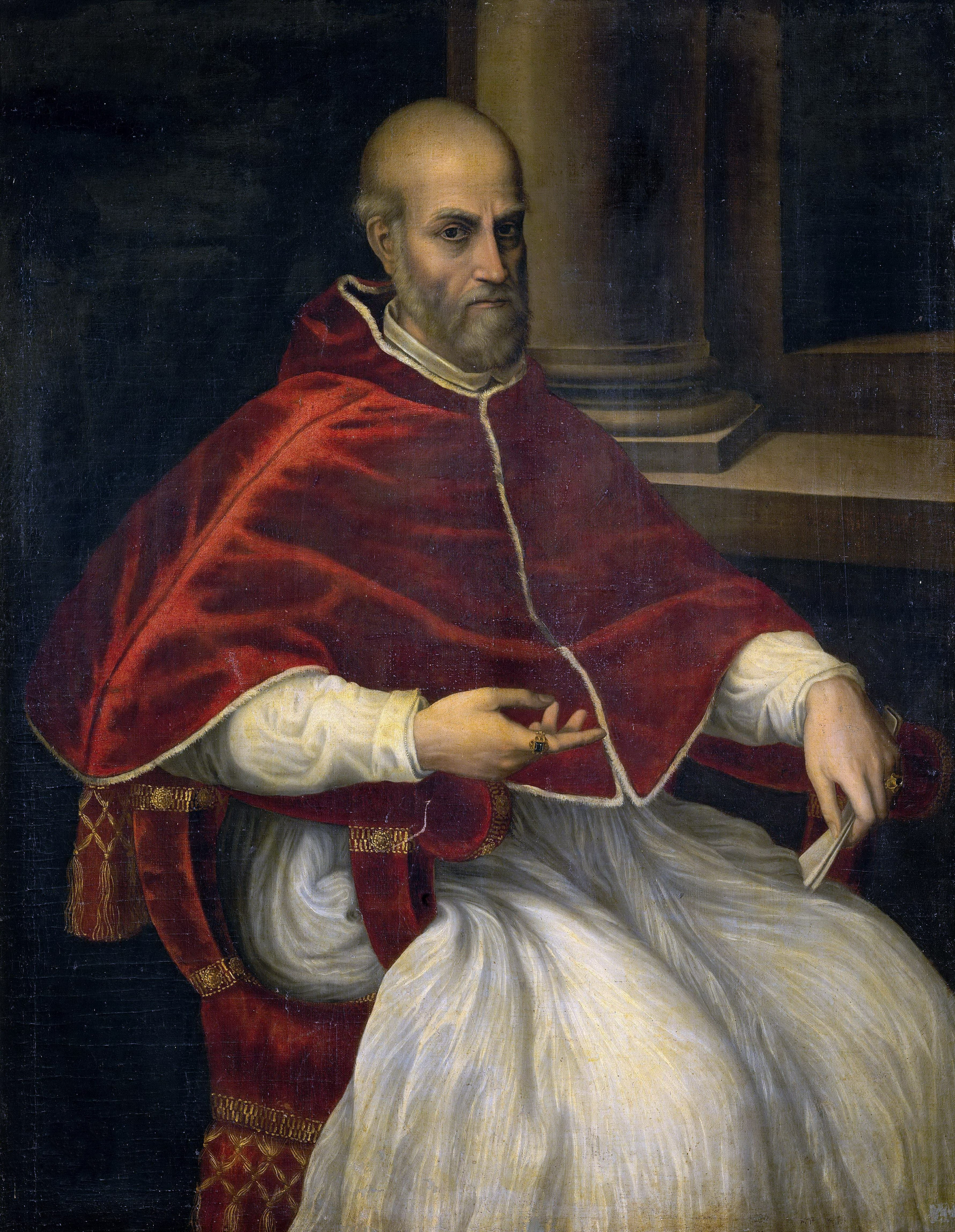

The April 1555 papal conclave (5–9 April) was convoked after the death of Pope Julius III. The cardinals at the conclave generally grouped themselves into three major factions, according to their alignment with the French House of Valois, the Habsburgs, or Italian states that remained independent of both major Catholic powers. After preparing a conclave capitulation that compelled whichever cardinal was elected pope to maintain neutrality in European wars, cardinals from the Holy Roman Empire joined in supporting the French faction's candidate, Cardinal Marcello Cervini. Cervini was elected Julius's successor, and chose to maintain his baptismal (birth) name as his papal name, becoming consecrated as Marcellus II.

== List of participants ==
Pope Julius III died on March 23, 1555. Thirty-seven out of fifty-seven cardinals participated in the election of his successor:

- Gian Pietro Carafa (created cardinal on December 22, 1536) – Cardinal-Bishop of Ostia e Velletri; Dean of the Sacred College of Cardinals; Grand Inquisitor of the Supreme S.C. of the Roman and Universal Inquisition; Archbishop of Naples
- Jean du Bellay (May 21, 1535) – Cardinal-Bishop of Porto e Santa Rufina; Bishop of Le Mans
- Juan Álvarez de Toledo, O.P. (December 20, 1538) – Cardinal-Bishop of Albano; Inquisitor of Rome; Archbishop of Santiago de Compostela; Cardinal-protector of the Orders of Dominicans and Barnabites
- Rodolfo Pio di Carpi (December 22, 1536) – Cardinal-Bishop of Frascati; Administrator of Girgento; Legate in the province of Patrimonium; Cardinal-protector of Scotland; Cardinal-protector of the Orders of Capuchins and Jesuits
- Niccolò Caetani (December 22, 1536) – Cardinal-Priest of S. Eustachio; Archbishop of Capua; Administrator of Quimper
- Marcello Cervini (December 19, 1539) – Cardinal-Priest of S. Croce in Gerusalemme; Bishop of Gubbio; Librarian of the Holy Roman Church
- Miguel da Silva (December 19, 1539) – Cardinal-Priest of Santa Maria in Trastevere; Administrator of Massa Marittima
- Cristoforo Madruzzo (June 2, 1542) – Cardinal-Priest of S. Cesareo in Palatio; Bishop of Trento and Brixen
- Bartolomé de la Cueva (December 19, 1544) – Cardinal-Priest of S. Bartolomeo all’Isola
- Georges d'Armagnac (December 19, 1544) – Cardinal-Priest of SS. Giovanni e Paolo; Bishop of Rodez
- Federico Cesi (December 19, 1544) – Cardinal-Priest of S. Prisca; Administrator of Cremona; Camerlengo of the Sacred College of Cardinals
- Tiberio Crispi (December 19, 1544) – Cardinal-Priest of S. S. Agata alla Suburra; Administrator of Amalfi
- Girolamo Verallo (April 8, 1549) – Cardinal-Priest of S. Marcello
- Giovanni Angelo Medici (April 8, 1549) – Cardinal-Priest of S. Stefano in Monte Celio; Bishop of Cassano al Ionio; Governor of Campagna e Marittima; Prefect of the Tribunal of the Apostolic Signature of Grace
- Fulvio della Corgna, O.S.Io.Hieros. (November 20, 1551) – Cardinal-Priest of S. Maria in Via; Administrator of Spoleto; Legate in Ascoli Piceno and Rieti
- Giovanni Ricci (November 20, 1551) – Cardinal-Priest of S. Vitale, Gervasio e Protasio
- Giovanni Andrea Mercurio (November 20, 1551) – Cardinal-Priest of S. Ciriaco alla Terme; Archbishop of Messina
- Giacomo Puteo (November 20, 1551) – Cardinal-Priest of S. Simeon in Posterula; Archbishop of Bari
- Pietro Bertani, O.P. (November 20, 1551) – Cardinal-Priest of S. Marcellino e Pietro; Bishop of Fano
- Fabio Mignanelli (November 20, 1551) – Cardinal-Priest of S. Silvestro in Capite; Prefect of the Papal States
- Giovanni Poggio (November 20, 1551) – Cardinal-Priest of S. Anastasia; Bishop of Tropea
- Giovanni Battista Cicala (November 20, 1551) – Cardinal-Priest of S. Clemente; Legate in Campagna; Administrator of Mariana
- Girolamo Dandini (November 20, 1551) – Cardinal-Priest of S. Matteo in Merulana; Cardinal Secretary of State
- Cristoforo Ciocchi del Monte (November 20, 1551) – Cardinal-Priest of S. Prassede; Bishop of Marseilles
- Giovanni Michele Saraceni (November 20, 1551) – Cardinal-Priest of S. Maria in Aracoeli; Archbishop of Acerenza e Matera
- Francesco Pisani (July 1, 1517) – Cardinal-Deacon of S. Marco; commendatario of S. Maria in Portico; Protodeacon of the Sacred College of Cardinals; Bishop of Padua; Administrator of Narbonne
- Ercole Gonzaga (May 3, 1527) – Cardinal-Deacon of S. Maria Nuova; Bishop of Mantua; Cardinal-protector of Spain; Cardinal-protector of the Order of Canons Regular; Regent of the Duchy of Mantua
- Guido Ascanio Sforza di Santa Fiora (December 18, 1534) – Cardinal-Deacon of S. Maria in Via Lata; Camerlengo of the Holy Roman Church; Archpriest of the patriarchal Liberian Basilica; Administrator of Parma; Cardinal-protector of Spain and Armenia
- Ippolito II d'Este (December 20, 1538) – Cardinal-Deacon of S. Maria in Aquiro; Administrator of Auch; Governor of Tivoli; Cardinal-protector of France
- Giacomo Savelli (December 19, 1539) – Cardinal-Deacon of S. Nicola in Carcere Tulliano; Legate in March of Ancona
- Girolamo Capodiferro (December 19, 1544) – Cardinal-Deacon of S. Giorgio in Velabro; Bishop of Saint-Jean-de-Maurienne
- Ranuccio Farnese (December 16, 1545) – Cardinal-Deacon of S. Angelo in Pescheria; Grand penitentiary; Administrator of Ravenna; Archpriest of the patriarchal Lateran Basilica; Legate in Viterbo
- Giulio Feltre della Rovere (July 27, 1547) – Cardinal-Deacon of S. S. Pietro in Vincoli; Legate in Umbria and Perugia
- Innocenzo del Monte (May 30, 1550) – Cardinal-Deacon of S. Onofrio
- Luigi Cornaro (November 20, 1551) – Cardinal-Deacon of S. Teodoro; Archbishop of Zadar
- Roberto de Nobili (December 22, 1553) – Cardinal-Deacon of S. Maria in Domnica
- Girolamo Simoncelli (December 22, 1553) – Cardinal-Deacon of SS. Cosma e Damiano; Bishop of Orvieto

Fifteen electors were created by Julius III, twenty by Pope Paul III, one by Pope Clement VII and one by Leo X.

== Absentee cardinals ==
Twenty cardinals were absent:

- Louis de Bourbon de Vendôme (July 1, 1517) – Cardinal-Bishop of Palestrina; Administrator of Sens
- François de Tournon (March 9, 1530) – Cardinal-Bishop of Sabina; Archbishop of Lyon; Superior General of the Order of Canons Regular of Saint Augustine
- Robert de Lenoncourt (December 20, 1538) – Cardinal-Priest of S. Apollinare; Protopriest of the Sacred College of Cardinals; Administrator of Metz
- Claude de Longuy de Givry (November 7, 1533) – Cardinal-Priest of S. Agnese in Agone; Administrator of Langres
- Antoine Sanguin de Meudon (December 19, 1539) – Cardinal-Priest of S. Crisogono; Administrator of Toulouse
- Giovanni Girolamo Morone (June 2, 1542) – Cardinal-Priest of S. Lorenzo in Lucina; Bishop of Novara; Papal Legate in Germany; Cardinal-protector of Austria and Ireland; Cardinal-protector of Order of Cistercians
- Francisco Mendoza de Bobadilla (December 19, 1544) – Cardinal-Priest of S. Eusebio; Archbishop of Burgos
- Jacques d'Annebaut (December 19, 1544) – Cardinal-Priest of S. Susanna; Bishop of Lisieux
- Otto Truchess von Waldburg (December 19, 1544) – Cardinal-Priest of S. Sabina; Bishop of Augsburg
- Durante Duranti (December 19, 1544) – Cardinal-Priest of SS. XII Apostoli; Bishop of Brescia
- Pedro Pacheco de Villena (December 16, 1545) – Cardinal-Priest of S. Balbina; Bishop of Sigüenza; Viceroy of the Kingdom of Naples
- Henry of Portugal (December 16, 1545) – Cardinal-Priest of SS. IV Coronati; Archbishop of Évora; Legate a latere in Portugal; Inquisitor General of the Portuguese Inquisition
- Charles de Lorraine-Guise (July 27, 1547) – Cardinal-Priest of S. Cecilia; Archbishop of Reims
- Pietro Tagliavia de Aragonia (December 22, 1553) – Cardinal-Priest of [no title assigned]; Archbishop of Palermo
- Girolamo Doria (January, 1529) – Cardinal-Deacon of S. Tommaso in Parione; Administrator of Tarragona
- Odet de Coligny de Châtillon (November 7, 1533) – Cardinal-Deacon of S. Adriano; Administrator of Beauvais
- Alessandro Farnese (December 18, 1534) – Cardinal-Deacon of S. Lorenzo in Damaso; Vice-Chancellor of the Holy Roman Church; Archpriest of the patriarchal Vatican Basilica; Legate in Avignon; Administrator of Monreale and Cahors; Cardinal-protector of Poland, Portugal, Germany, Kingdom of Sicily, Republic of Genoa and Republic of Ragusa; Cardinal-protector of the Orders of Benedictines and Servites
- Reginald Pole (December 22, 1536) – Cardinal-Deacon of S. Maria in Cosmedin; Papal Legate in England
- Charles de Bourbon de Vendôme (January 9, 1548) – Cardinal-Deacon of S. Sisto; Archbishop of Rouen
- Louis I de Guise (December 22, 1553) – Cardinal-Deacon of [no deaconry assigned]; Administrator of Albi

Thirteen were created by Paul III, four by Clement VII, two by Julius III and one by Leo X.

== Divisions in the Sacred College ==
College of Cardinals was divided into three parties:

- French party – the adherents of the king Henry II of France. Their leader was Charles de Lorraine-Guise.
- Habsburg party – cardinals aligned with Emperor Charles V. Their leader was Cardinal Juan Álvarez de Toledo.
- Italian party – group of Italian cardinals headed by Alessandro Farnese, Cardinal-nephew of Paul III, with no direct connections with main Catholic powers: Habsburg Empire or France.

== The election of Pope Marcellus II ==
The Cardinals present in Rome entered the conclave on April 5. Initially, they prepared and subscribed the conclave capitulation, which obliged the newly elected pope to maintain neutrality in the European conflicts and forbade him to conduct wars against Christian princes. In spite of the existing divisions, cardinals quickly achieved consensus. On April 9 at 11 p.m. they elected by acclamation Cardinal Marcello Cervini. He was proposed by the French faction, but also obtained the support of the Imperial cardinals (e.g. Madruzzo) despite the express wishes of Charles V against Cervini's election.

On April 10 in the morning a formal scrutiny took place to confirm the election. Cervini received all votes except of his own, which he gave to Gian Pietro Carafa. He retained his baptismal name, adding to it only an ordinal number (Marcellus II). On that same day, he was consecrated bishop of Rome by Cardinal Gian Pietro Carafa, bishop of Ostia e Velletri and Dean of the College of Cardinals, and crowned by Cardinal Francesco Pisani, Protodeacon of S. Marco.

== See also ==
- List of popes

== Sources ==
- O. Panvinio, J. Strada, Epitome pontificum Romanorum a s. Petro usque ad Paulum IIII, gestorum videlicet electionisque singulorum & conclavium compendiaria narratio. Cardinalium item nomina... Onuphrio Panvinio,... authore... Ex musaeo Jacobi Stradae,... (J. de Strada edidit), Impensis Jacobi Stradae Mantuani, 1557.
- Leti, Gregorio (1667). Conclavi de' pontefici romani, quali si sono potuti trovare fin à questo giorno [éd. Grogorio Leti] (in Italian). Vol. I. no place given: no publisher given. pp. 135–144.
- Petruccelli della Gattina, Ferdinando (1864). Histoire diplomatique des conclaves (in French). Vol. II. Paris: A. Lacroix, Verboeckhoven et cie.
- Herre, Paul (1907). Papsttum und Papstwahl im Zeitalter Philipps II (in German). Leipzig: Teubner.
- Vatican History
- Valérie Pirie, The Triple Crown: An Account of the Papal Conclaves. Pope Marcellus II (Cervini)
- List of participants of papal conclave of April 1555 (by Salvador Miranda)
- S. Miranda: Cardinal Marcello Cervini (Pope Marcellus II)
- Bautz Biografisch-Bibliografiches Kirchenlexikon: Marcellus II
- Pope Marcellus II The Catholic Encyclopedia
