= Fabio Mignanelli =

Italian bishop and cardinal

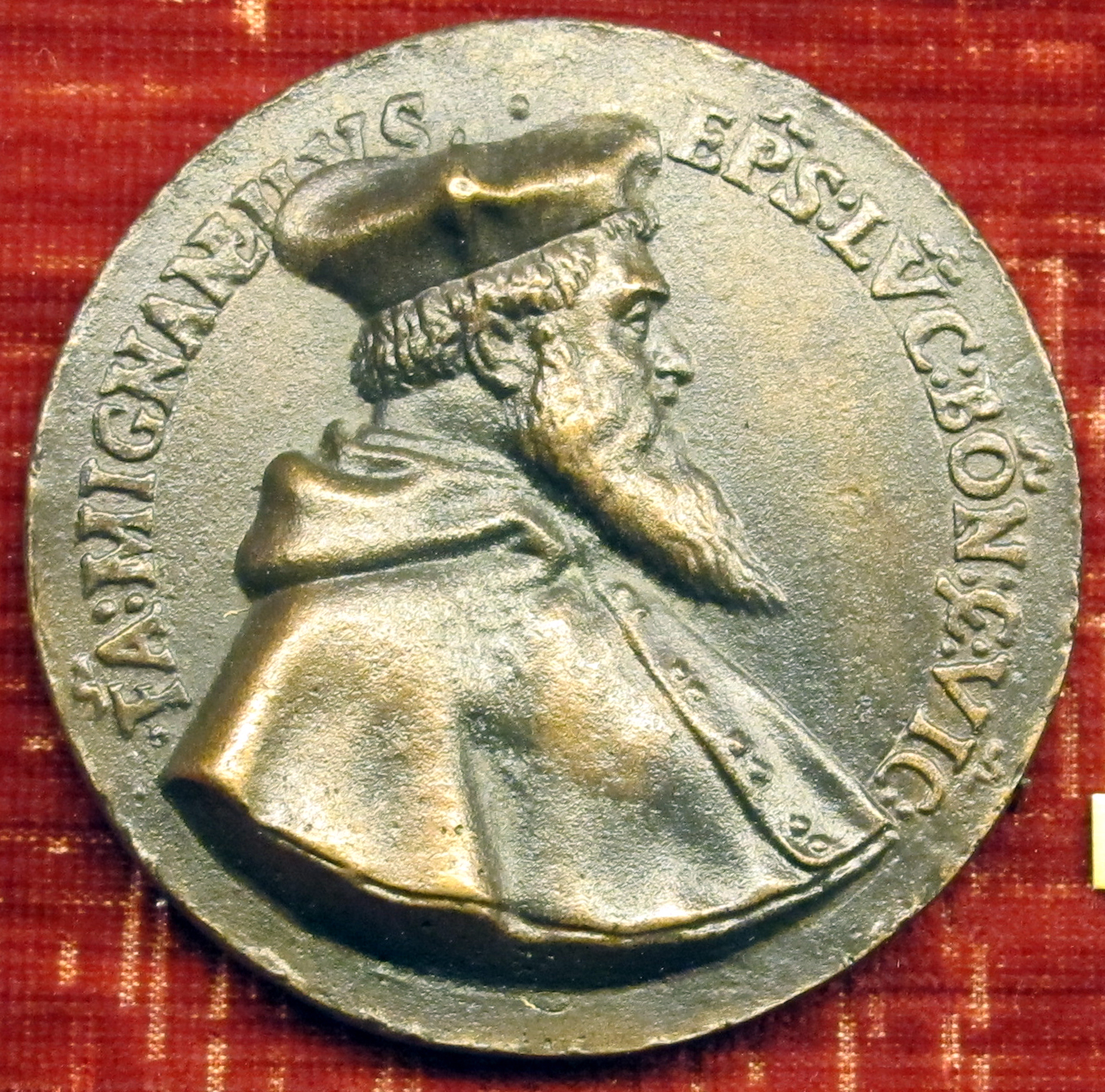
Fabio Mignanelli medal

Fabio Mignanelli (died 10 August 1557) was an Italian Roman Catholic bishop and cardinal.

== Biography ==
Fabio Mignanelli was born in Siena ca. 1486, the son of Pietro Paolo Mignanelli and Onorata Saraceni. He attended the University of Siena, becoming a doctor of both laws. He then became a professor of law at the University of Siena.

In 1533, he moved to Rome, becoming a consistorial advocate. He was married to Antonina Capodiferro, the sister of Cardinal Girolamo Recanati Capodiferro and had a son. After Antonia died, Mignanelli entered the church. In 1537, he was sent as ambassador to the Republic of Venice to encourage Venice to break its alliance with the Ottoman Empire and to go to war against the Ottomans. In October 1537, Pope Paul III sent him as ambassador to Charles V, Holy Roman Emperor to present him with the brief postponing the Council of Trent for a second time. In spring 1538, he traveled to Nice with the pope to negotiate the end of the Italian War of 1536–1538; shortly thereafter, they traveled to Geneva to meet the emperor. On 3 September 1538 he was appointed nuncio to Ferdinand, King of the Romans, holding this position until 1539. In 1540, he became an auditor of the Roman Rota. He was also a protonotary apostolic and the pope's domestic prelate.

On 15 November 1540 he was elected Bishop of Lucera. He was appointed governor and vice-legate in Bologna on 14 April 1541. From 22 July 1543 to 2 August 1544 he was nuncio to the Republic of Venice. He was present at the opening of the Council of Trent on 13 December 1545. In 1546 he was vice-legate in Marche. On 20 September 1546 the pope sent him as nuncio to the emperor. In 1548, he was vice-legate in Ascoli Piceno. On 10 June 1551 he was appointed commissary of the Adriatic ports.

Pope Julius III made him a cardinal priest in the consistory of 20 November 1551. He received the red hat and the titular church of San Silvestro in Capite on 4 December 1551. Shortly thereafter, he became Prefect of the Apostolic Signatura. On 13 August 1552 the pope made him legate a latere to pacify Siena. On 17 May 1553 he resigned the government of his diocese, becoming administrator of Grosseto; he resigned in favor of his nephew, Giacomo Mignanelli on 2 October 1553. Pope Julius III then made him Prefect of the Papal States.

He was a participant in both the papal conclave of April 1555 that elected Pope Marcellus II and the papal conclave of May 1555 that elected Pope Paul IV.

He opted for the titular church of Santi Giovanni e Paolo on 12 June 1556.

He died in Rome on 10 August 1557. He was buried in Santa Maria della Pace.

Catholic Church titles
Preceded by Enrique de Villalobos Xeres	Bishop of Lucera; 1540–1543	Succeeded by Pietro de Petris
Preceded by Giorgio Andreasi	Apostolic Nuncio to Venice; 1543–1544	Succeeded by Giovanni Della Casa
Preceded by Tommaso Badia	Cardinal-Priest of San Silvestro in Capite; 1551–1556	Succeeded by Taddeo Gaddi (cardinal)
Preceded by Marco Antonio Campeggi	Administrator of Grosseto; 1553	Succeeded by Giacomo Mignanelli
Preceded by Georges d'Armagnac	Cardinal-Priest of Santi Giovanni e Paolo; 1556–1557	Succeeded by Antonio Trivulzio (iuniore)
