= May 1555 conclave =

Election of Catholic Pope Paul IV

Papal conclave May 1555

Dates and location
- 15–23 May 1555; Apostolic Palace, Papal States

Key officials
- Dean: Gian Pietro Carafa
- Camerlengo: Guido Ascanio Sforza
- Protopriest: Claude de Longwy
- Protodeacon: Francesco Pisani

Elected pope
- Gian Pietro Carafa; Name taken: Paul IV
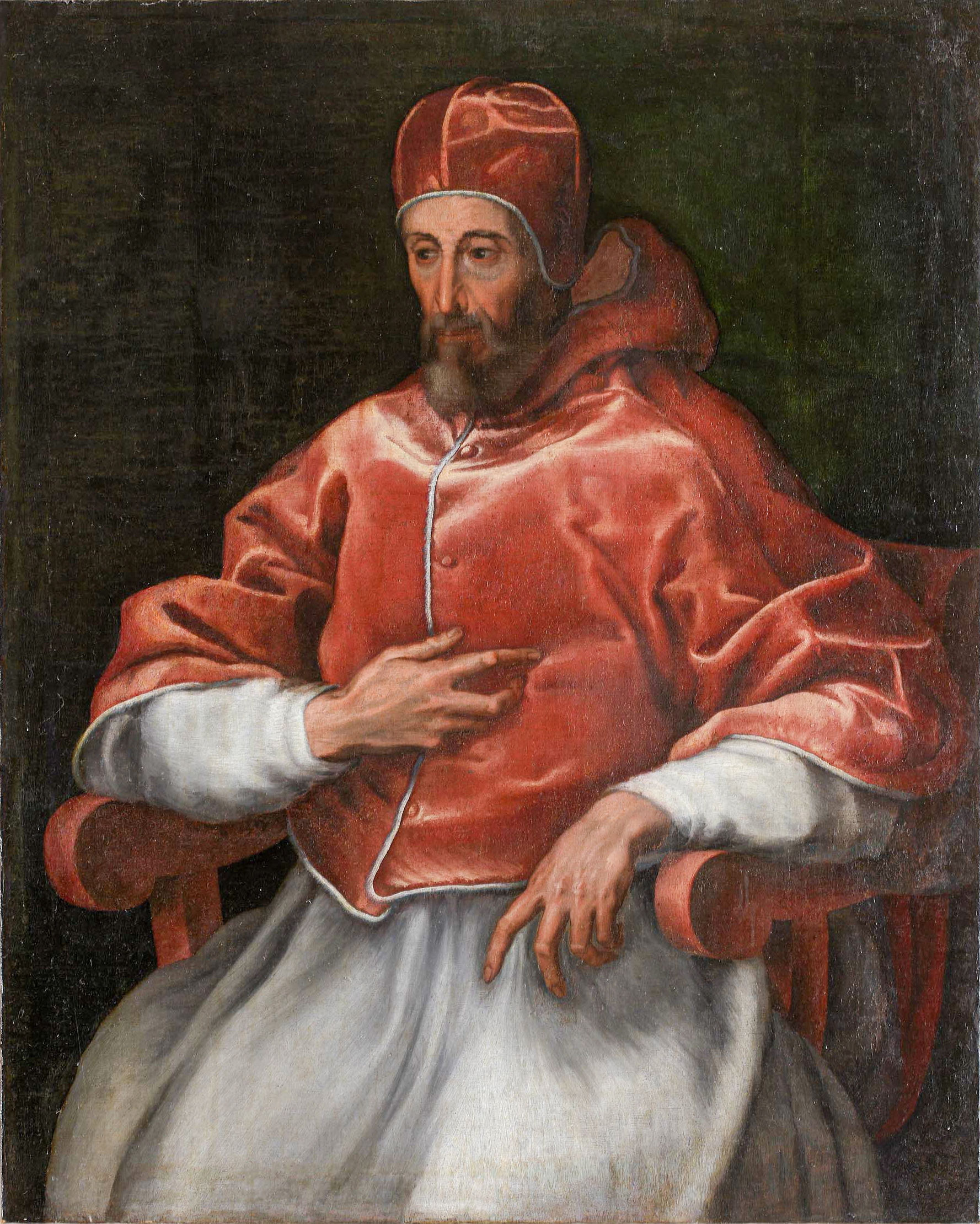

The May 1555 papal conclave (15–23 May) was convened on the death of Pope Marcellus II (whose reign had only lasted from 9 April to 1 May that year) and elected Pope Paul IV as his successor.

== Background ==
Pope Marcellus II was elected unanimously on 9 April 1555, and there were high hopes for accelerating the reform of the Church with his election. Unfortunately, shortly after his election, the 54-year-old pope fell ill and died in the early morning hours of 1 May 1555 after only 22 days of pontificate. His death was sincerely mourned and left the cardinals perplexed and dismayed.

== List of participants ==
The conclave was attended by 45 of the 56 cardinals: Twenty-five of the cardinals had been appointed by Pope Paul III, seventeen by Julius III, two by Pope Clement VII, and one by Leo X.

- Gian Pietro Carafa; Cardinal of Naples, Cardinal Bishop of Ostia e Velletri; Dean of the Sacred College of Cardinals; Inquisitor General of the Holy Office of the Inquisition; Archbishop of Naples
- Jean du Bellay (May 21, 1535) – cardinal bishop of Porto e Santa Rufina; bishop of Le Mans
- Juan Álvarez de Toledo OP; Cardinal of Burgos (December 20, 1538) – Cardinal Bishop of Albano; Archbishop of Santiago de Compostela; Inquisitor General of the Holy Office of the Inquisition;
- Rodolfo Pio di Carpi (aged 55), Cardinal Bishop of Tusculum (Frascati). Administrator of the See of Agrigento (1544–1564). Totius Ordinis Sancti Francisci Protector [Annales Minorum sub anno 1555, xiii, p. 31]. (died May 2, 1564) "Santo Giacomo"
- Robert de Lénoncourt (December 20, 1538) – cardinal presbyter of S. Apollinare; administrator of the Diocese of Metz
- Miguel da Silva; Cardinal of Viseu (December 19, 1539) – cardinal presbyter of S. Maria in Trastevere; administrator of Massa Marittima
- Giovanni Girolamo Morone (June 2, 1542) – cardinal presbyter of S. Lorenzo in Lucina; bishop of Novara; protector of Austria
- Cristoforo Madruzzo; Cardinal of Trento (June 2, 1542) – Cardinal presbyter of S. Cesareo in Palatio; bishop of Trento and Brixen
- Georges d'Armagnac (December 19, 1544) – cardinal presbyter of Ss. Giovanni e Paolo; bishop of Rodez
- Otto Truchsess von Waldburg; Cardinal of Augsburg (December 19, 1544) – Cardinal presbyter of S. Sabina; bishop of Augsburg
- Francisco Mendoza de Bobadilla; Cardinal of Coria (December 19, 1544) – Cardinal presbyter of S. Eusebio; archbishop of Burgos
- Bartolomé de la Cueva y Toledo (December 19, 1544) – Cardinal presbyter of S. Bartolomeo all'Isola
- Durante Duranti; Cardinal of Brescia (December 19, 1544) – Cardinal Presbyter Ss. XII Apostoli; bishop of Brescia
- Pedro Pacheco de Villena (December 16, 1545) – Cardinal presbyter of S. Balbina; bishop of Sigüenza; viceroy of Naples
- Ranuccio Farnese; Cardinal S. Angelo (December 16, 1545) – cardinal presbyter of S. Angelo in Pescheria; penitentiary major; administrator of the archdiocese of Ravenna; archpriest of the Lateran basilica; titular patriarch of Constantinople; grand prior of the Order of St. John of Jerusalem in Venice; commandant of the territorial abbey of Farfa
- Girolamo Verallo (April 8, 1549) – cardinal presbyter of S. Marcello; inquisitor general of the Holy Office of the Inquisition
- Giovanni Angelo Medici (April 8, 1549) – cardinal presbyter of S. Stefano in Monte Celio; prefect of the Court of the Signatura of Grace; bishop of Cassano al Ionio
- Tiberio Crispo (December 19, 1544) – cardinal presbyter of S. S. Agata alla Suburra; administrator of the archdiocese of Amalfi
- Cristoforo Guidalotti Ciocchi del Monte; Cardinal of Marseilles (November 20, 1551) – Cardinal presbyter of S. Prassede; bishop of Marseilles
- Fulvio della Corgna; Cardinal of Perugia (November 20, 1551) – cardinal presbyter of S. Maria in Via; administrator of the diocese of Spoleto; apostolic legate in Ascoli and Rieti; governor of Norcia
- Giovanni Michele Saraceni (November 20, 1551) – cardinal presbyter of S. Maria in Aracoeli; archbishop of Acerenza e Matera
- Giovanni Ricci; Cardinal of Montepulciano[2] (November 20, 1551) – Cardinal presbyter of S. Vitale, Gervasio e Protasio; apostolic legate in Bologna
- Giovanni Andrea Mercurio; Cardinal of Messina[2] (November 20, 1551) – Cardinal presbyter of S. Ciriaco e Ss. Quirico e Giulitta; archbishop of Messina
- Giacomo Puteo (November 20, 1551) – Cardinal presbyter of S. Simeone in Posterula; prefect of the Signatura of the Apostolic Breve; archbishop of Bari; inquisitor general of the Holy Office of the Inquisition
- Pietro Bertani OP; Cardinal of Fano[2] (November 20, 1551) – cardinal presbyter of S. Marcellino e Pietro; bishop of Fano
- Fabio Mignanelli (November 20, 1551) – cardinal presbyter of S. Silvestro in Capite; prefect of the Court of the Signatura of Justice
- Giovanni Poggio (November 20, 1551) – cardinal presbyter of S. Anastasia; bishop of Tropea
- Giovanni Battista Cicala; Cardinal of S. Clemente[2] (November 20, 1551) – cardinal presbyter of S. Clemente; apostolic legate in Campania; administrator of the diocese of Mariana
- Girolamo Dandini; Cardinal of Imola[2] (November 20, 1551) – Cardinal presbyter of S. Matteo in Merulana
- Pietro Tagliavia d'Aragonia; Cardinal of Palermo (December 22, 1553) – Cardinal presbyter of S. Callisto; Archbishop of Palermo
- Francesco Pisani (July 1, 1517) – cardinal deacon of S. Marco; commandant of the deaconry of S. Maria in Portico; protodeacon of the Holy College of Cardinals; bishop of Padua; administrator of the archdiocese of Narbonne
- Ercole Gonzaga; Cardinal of Mantua[2] (May 3, 1527) – cardinal deacon of S. Maria Nuova; bishop of Mantua; protector of Spain; regent of the duchy of Mantua
- Girolamo Doria (January 1529) – cardinal deacon of S. Tommaso in Parione; administrator of the archdiocese of Tarragona
- Alessandro Farnese (December 18, 1534) – cardinal deacon of S. Lorenzo in Damaso; vice chancellor of the Holy Roman Church; archpriest of the Vatican basilica; apostolic legate in Avignon; administrator of the archdiocese of Monreale and the diocese of Cahors; commandant of the territorial abbeys of S. Paolo fuori le mura and Tre Fontane; protector of Poland
- Guido Ascanio Sforza; Cardinal S. Fiora (December 18, 1534) – cardinal deacon of S. Maria in Via Lata; butler of the Holy Roman Church; archpriest of the basilica of Liberia; administrator of the diocese of Parma; protector of Portugal
- Niccolò Caetani; Cardinal of Sermoneta[2] (December 22, 1536) – Cardinal deacon of S. Eustachio; archbishop of Capua; administrator of the diocese of Quimper; governor of Terracina
- Ippolito d'Este; Cardinal of Ferrara[2] (December 20, 1538) – Cardinal deacon of S. Maria in Aquiro; administrator of the archdiocese of Auch; governor of Tivoli; protector of France
- Giacomo Savelli (December 19, 1539) – cardinal deacon of S. Nicola in Carcere Tulliano; apostolic legate in the Anconian Marches
- Girolamo Recanati Capodiferro (December 19, 1544) – cardinal deacon of S. Giorgio in Velabro; bishop of Saint-Jean-de-Maurienne; apostolic legate in Romagna
- Giulio Feltre della Rovere; Cardinal of Urbino[2] (July 27, 1547) – Cardinal deacon of S. Pietro in Vincoli; apostolic legate in Umbria and Perugia; commandant of the territorial abbey of Saint-Victor de Marseille
- Innocenzo Ciocchi del Monte (May 30, 1550) – cardinal deacon of S. Onofrio; administrator of the diocese of Mirepoix
- Luigi Cornaro (November 20, 1551) – cardinal deacon of S. Teodoro; archbishop of Zadar; grand prior of the Order of St. John of Jerusalem in Cyprus
- Louis de Guise (December 22, 1553) – cardinal deacon without title; administrator of the diocese of Albi
- Roberto de' Nobili (December 22, 1553) – cardinal deacon of S. Maria in Domnica
- Girolamo Simoncelli (December 22, 1553) – cardinal deacon of Ss. Cosma e Damiano; bishop-elect of Orvieto

== Absent ==
There were 11 cardinals absent:

- Louis de Bourbon de Vendôme; Cardinal de Bourbon[2] (July 1, 1517) – Cardinal Bishop of Palestrina; administrator of the archdiocese of Sens.
- François de Tournon (March 9, 1530) – Cardinal Bishop of Sabine; Archbishop of Lyon and Primate of Gaul; General of the Antonian Order
- Claude de Longwy de Givry; Cardinal of Langres[2] (November 7, 1533) – cardinal presbyter of S. Agnese in Agone; protopresbyter of the Holy College of Cardinals; administrator of the Diocese of Langres
- Antoine Sanguin de Meudon; Cardinal of Orléans[2] (December 19, 1539) – Cardinal presbyter of S. Crisogono; administrator of the archdiocese of Toulouse
- Jacques d'Annebaut; Cardinal of Lisieux[2] (December 19, 1544) – Cardinal presbyter of S. Susanna; bishop of Lisieux
- Federico Cesi (December 19, 1544) – Cardinal presbyter of S. Prisca; administrator of the diocese of Cremona; butler of the Holy College of Cardinals
- Henry of Portugal; Cardinal of Évora[2] (December 16, 1545) – cardinal presbyter of Ss. IV Coronati; archbishop of Évora; papal legate in Portugal; inquisitor general of Portugal
- Charles de Lorraine-Guise (July 27, 1547) – cardinal presbyter of S. Cecilia; archbishop of Reims; commandant of the territorial abbey of Cluny
- Charles de Bourbon-Vendôme (January 9, 1548) – cardinal presbyter of S. Sisto; archbishop of Rouen
- Odet de Coligny de Châtillon (November 7, 1533) – Cardinal deacon of S. Adriano; administrator of the diocese of Beauvais
- Reginald Pole; Cardinal of England (December 22, 1536) – Cardinal deacon of S. Maria in Cosmedin; papal legate in England

== Factions and candidates ==
- The pro-French cardinals were: (Bellay, Armagnac, Guise, Lenoncourt, Este, Della Rovere, Capodiferro, Dandini, Caetani, Innocenzo del Monte, Nobili, Mignanelli, Ranuccio Farnese, Alessandro Farnese, and Saraceni).
- Several cardinals were formally considered neutral (Carafa, Morone, Pisani, da Silva, Duranti, Crispi, Savelli, Verallo); among them were several who were strongly committed to the work of reforming the Church, but they too had their political leanings (for example, Morone was a supporter of the Emperor, and Carafa of France).
- A third faction was estimated to number more than 20 (Sforza, Madruzzo, Carpi, Toledo, Truchsess, Doria, Medici, del Pozzo, Mendoza, Cueva, Pacheco, Cristoforo del Monte, Della Corgna, Ricci, Mercurio, Poggio, Cicala, Tagliavia, Gonzaga, Bertani, Cornaro, and Simoncelli).

However, these factions were not cohesive. Alessandro Farnese's alliance with France was only tactical, and he was a rival of Cardinal d'Este, the leader and candidate of the French faction. On the other hand, some had their own ambitions for the tiara and played primarily for themselves (Carpi, Toledo).

Morone, Pole and Carafa were considered the main candidates. Cardinal Pole was supported by Farnese, but was harmed by his English background, and the fact that he was not present at the conclave. Cardinals Pio di Carpi, Toledo and d'Este also had their ambitions. The latter was the official candidate of France.

== The conclave ==
The conclave began on May 15 with the participation of 42 cardinals. Cardinal Gonzaga arrived on May 16, Pacheco on May 17, and Lenoncourt on May 22, setting the number of electors at 45.

The first vote was held on May 18. None of the candidates gained a clear advantage in it. Seeing the defeat of its favorites, one faction put forward Giacomo del Pozzo's candidacy as a compromise and managed to convince most of the neutral cardinals to support it. When del Pozzo could already count on 25 votes, his supporters attempted to recruit the influential Cardinal Alessandro Farnese for him. This one, however, felt offended that he had not been consulted earlier and refused to support it. In consultation with the French and Cardinal d'Este, Farnese proposed Bishop Carafa of Ostia and undertook a successful campaign for him. He even convinced Carpi and Toledo to support Carafa. Sixteen other cardinals headed by Sforza and Madruzzo strongly opposed Carafa, as Emperor Charles V had explicitly excluded him. During the night of May 22-23, intensive negotiations between the first-cousins Sforza and Farnese were held in search of a compromise, which did not bear fruit. In this situation, Farnese and his allies decided to obtain a 2/3 majority for Carafa through individual negotiations with their opponents. This proved to be an effective method, as early as May 23, three of Carafa's opponents (Bertani, Cornaro and Poggio) switched to his side, giving him the required majority. In this situation, the imperial faction deemed further resistance pointless.

== Election of Paul IV ==
On 23 May 1555 Giovanni Pietro Carafa was elected by acclamation and took the name Paul IV. Three days later he was solemnly crowned.

The election came as a complete surprise to public opinion at the time. Although considered a worthy candidate, Carafa had many enemies and was widely feared as a harsh inquisitor, so few expected him to get the required majority. The coming years proved that he was feared for good reason, and accusations of heresy did not escape even the cardinals.

== Sources ==
- Antonio Santosuosso (Winter 1978). "An Account of the Election of Paul IV to the Pontificate". Renaissance Quarterly. 31 (4): 486–498. doi:10.2307/2860374. JSTOR 2860374. S2CID 159533433.
