= Durante Duranti =

Italian Roman Catholic bishop and cardinal

Durante Duranti (5 October 1507 – 24 December 1557) was an Italian Roman Catholic bishop and cardinal.

== Biography ==
Durante Duranti was born in Palazzolo sull'Oglio on 5 October 1507. As a young man, he studied jurisprudence in Brescia and became a cleric in Brescia.

Moving to Rome, he became a privy chamberlain in the papal household of Pope Paul III. In 1535, Cardinal Alessandro Farnese, iuniore made Duranti vicar of the Abbey of San Michele de Coniolo. He served as Prefect of the Pontifical Household under Pope Paul III.

On 25 June 1538 he was elected Bishop of Alghero; he was consecrated as a bishop in Rome on 12 March 1540. He was transferred to the see of Cassano on 18 February 1541.

Pope Paul III made him a cardinal priest in the consistory of 19 December 1544. He received the red hat and the titular church of Santi Apostoli on 9 January 1545. The pope then named him papal legate in Camerino, Spoleto, and Umbria on 19 October 1545.

He participated in the papal conclave of 1549-50 that elected Pope Julius III. He was transferred to the see of Brescia on 18 February 1551.

He was a participant in both the papal conclave of April 1555 that elected Pope Marcellus II and the papal conclave of May 1555 that elected Pope Paul IV.

He died in Brescia on 24 December 1557. He was buried in Brescia Cathedral.

Catholic Church titles
Preceded by Juan Reina	Bishop of Alghero; 1538–1541	Succeeded by Pietro Vaguer
Preceded by Cristoforo Giacobazzi	Bishop of Cassano all'Jonio; 1541–1551	Succeeded by Bernardo Antonio de' Medici
Preceded by Miguel da Silva (cardinal)	Cardinal-Priest of Santi XII Apostoli; 1545–1557	Succeeded by Mark Sittich von Hohenems
Preceded by Andrea Cornaro (cardinal)	Bishop of Brescia; 1551–1557	Succeeded by Domenico Bollani
