= Pietro Bertani =

Italian cardinal

Pietro Bertani (1501–1558) was an Italian Roman Catholic bishop and cardinal.

== Biography ==
Pietro Bertani was born in Nonantola on 1 November 1501, the son of Francesco Bertani and Bianca Calori. He entered the Dominican Order at a young age, studying under Tommaso Badia.

After he was ordained as a priest, he became a lector of Christian theology at the University of Bologna. He later taught theology at the University of Ferrara, and then in Venice. He was a distinguished preacher, renowned for his knowledge of Augustine of Hippo and Thomas Aquinas, and preached throughout Italy. Cardinal Ercole Gonzaga made Bertani his theologian.

On 28 November 1537, he was elected Bishop of Fano. He attended the Council of Trent from 4 February 1546 until 3 March 1547. He was appointed to the Roman Curia on March 29, 1547. He successfully negotiated the return of Camerino to the Papal States from Guidobaldo II della Rovere, Duke of Urbino. In 1546, the Council of Trent sent him as envoy to Charles V, Holy Roman Emperor to settle the dispute about moving the council to Bologna. From 9 June 1548 until August 1550, he was nuncio extraordinary to the emperor, charged with resolving the dispute about Piacenza following the violent death of Pier Luigi Farnese, Duke of Parma. He also successfully settled a dispute between the emperor and Francis I, Duke of Saxe-Lauenburg. Pope Paul III intended to make him a cardinal, but the pope died before he could do so.

Pope Julius III made him a cardinal priest in the consistory of 20 November 1551. He received the red hat and the titular church of Santi Marcellino e Pietro al Laterano on 4 December 1551.

He was a participant in both the papal conclave of April 1555 that elected Pope Marcellus II and the papal conclave of May 1555 that elected Pope Paul IV.

He died of arthritis in Rome on 8 March 1558. He was buried in Santa Sabina, the Dominican mother church.
