= Girolamo Doria =

Italian Roman Catholic cardinal

Girolamo Doria (1495 – 25 March 1558) was an Italian Roman Catholic cardinal.

== Biography ==
Girolamo Doria was born in Genoa in 1495, the son of Andrea Doria. Early in his life, he married Luisa Spinola and had several children. He entered the ecclesiastical state after his wife died, becoming a cleric in Genoa.

Pope Clement VII made him a cardinal deacon in the consistory of January 1529. He received the red hat and the deaconry of San Tommaso in Parione on 15 November 1529.

In 1530, he attended the coronation of Charles V, Holy Roman Emperor by the pope in Bologna.

He was the administrator of the see of Elne from 12 January 1530 until 2 October 1532; administrator of the see of Huesca y Jaca from 2 October 1532 until 8 May 1533; administrator of the see of Tarragona from 8 May 1533; and administrator of the see of Noli from 13 April 1534 until 25 February 1549.

He participated in the papal conclave of 1534 that elected Pope Paul III.

From 15 November 1536 until 28 June 1538 he was administrator of the see of Nebbio.

He participated in the papal conclave of 1549-50 that elected Pope Julius III; the papal conclave of April 1555 that elected Pope Marcellus II; and the papal conclave of May 1555 that elected Pope Paul IV.

On 29 May 1555 he opted for the title of Santa Maria in Campitelli.

He died in Genoa on 25 March 1558. He is buried in the Augustinian church of Santa Maria della Cella.

== See also ==
- Catholic Church in Italy
