= Giovanni Andrea Mercurio =

Italian Roman Catholic bishop and cardinal

- Archbishop of Messina
- Church: Catholic Church
- Archdiocese: Archdiocese of Messina
- In office: 30 May 1550 – 2 February 1561
- Predecessor: Innocenzo Cybo
- Successor: Gaspar Cervantes de Gaeta
- Other post: Cardinal-Priest of San Marcello (1560-1561)
- Previous posts: Cardinal-Priest of San Ciriaco alle Terme Diocleziane (1553-1560); Cardinal-Priest of Santa Barbara (1551-1553); Archbishop of Manfredonia (1545-1550)

Orders
- Consecration: 20 September 1545 by Berardo Bongiovanni
- Created cardinal: 20 November 1551 by Pope Julius III

Personal details
- Born: 1518 Messina, Kingdom of Sicily, Crown of Aragon
- Died: 2 February 1561 (aged 42–43) Rome, Papal States

Giovanni Andrea Mercurio (1518–1561) was an Italian Roman Catholic bishop and cardinal.

== Biography ==
Giovanni Andrea Mercurio was born to a poor family in Messina in 1518.

As a young man, he worked for the notary for the Archdiocese of Messina. Following an incident with that notary, he decided to move to Rome. There, he entered the court of Cardinal Giovanni Maria Ciocchi del Monte, the future Pope Julius III, as his minoribus secretarius.

On 20 February 1545, he was elected Archbishop of Manfredonia. He was transferred to the Archdiocese of Messina on 30 May 1550.

Pope Julius III made him a cardinal priest in the consistory of 20 November 1551. He received the red hat and the titular church of Santa Barbara dei Librai on 4 December 1551. He opted for the titular church of San Ciriaco alle Terme Diocleziane on 18 August 1553.

He was a participant in the papal conclave of April 1555 that elected Pope Marcellus II; the papal conclave of May 1555 that elected Pope Paul IV; and the papal conclave of 1559 that elected Pope Pius IV. On 19 January 1560 he opted for the titular church of San Marcello al Corso.

He died in the Apostolic Palace on 2 February 1561. He was buried in San Marcello al Corso.

While bishop, he was the principal consecrator of: Paolo de Cupis, Bishop of Montepeloso (1546); and Filippo Roccabella, Bishop of Macerata (1546).

Catholic Church titles
Preceded by Giovanni Ricci	Archbishop of Manfredonia; 1545–1550	Succeeded by Sebastiano Antonio Pighini
Preceded by Innocenzo Cibo	Archbishop of Messina; 1550–1561	Succeeded by Gaspar Cervantes de Gaete
Preceded by	Cardinal-Priest of Santa Barbara dei Librai; 1551–1553	Succeeded by Pierdonato Cesi (seniore)
Preceded by Bernardino Maffei	Cardinal-Priest of San Ciriaco alle Terme Diocleziane; 1553–1560	Succeeded by Ludovico Simonetta
Preceded by Girolamo Dandini	Cardinal-Priest of San Marcello al Corso; 1560–1561	Succeeded by Marco Antonio Amulio
