= Girolamo Verallo =

Italian Roman Catholic cardinal and papal diplomat

Girolamo Verallo (1497–1555) was an Italian Roman Catholic cardinal and papal diplomat.

== Biography ==
Girolamo Verallo was born in Cori, Lazio in 1497, the son of Girolamo Veralli, a Roman physician, and Giulia Jacovazzi. His father was personal physician to Pope Paul III.

He was the nephew of Cardinal Domenico Giacobazzi. After studying law, he traveled to Rome, he served a governor of Velletri and then became referenda of the Apostolic Signatura. On 26 November 1534 he became an auditor of the Roman Rota. He also became an auditor of the Apostolic Palace. With Latino Giovenale Manetti, he was sent as part of a diplomatic mission in 1535 to Charles V, Holy Roman Emperor, and Francis I of France concerning ownership of the Camerino following the death of Giovanni Maria Varano, the last Duke of Camerino. From 1537 to February 1540, he was nuncio to the Republic of Venice. He was a protector of Ignatius of Loyola and the first Jesuits. In 1536, Ignatius and his first companions were in Venice and made a vow of poverty and chastity in the hands of the nuncio.

On 20 August 1540 he was elected Bishop of Bertinoro. On 17 June 1541 he was named nuncio to Ferdinand, King of the Romans, holding this position until 1545. On 14 November 1541 he was transferred to the see of Caserta. In August 1542 he traveled to Nuremberg with Bishop Otto Truchsess von Waldburg to present the Imperial Diet with the papal bull Initio nostri huius pontificatus (issued 22 May 1542) calling the Council of Trent, set to begin on 1 November 1542, and to attempt to convince German and Hungarian bishops to attend the council. He was promoted to the metropolitan see of Rossano on 14 November 1544. He was nuncio in Austria from February 1545 to 1547.

Pope Paul III made him a cardinal priest in the consistory of 8 April 1549. He received the red hat and the titular church of San Martino ai Monti on 10 May 1549. On 9 November 1549 he was transferred to the see of Capaccio.

He participated in the papal conclave of 1549-50 that elected Pope Julius III. He resigned the see of Rossano and Capaccio in favor of his brother, Paolo Emilio Verallo, in 1551. The new pope made him legate a latere to Henry II of France on 9 September 1551 to negotiate an end to the War of Parma between French troops and the Duchy of Parma. During this mission, he was accompanied by his nephew Giambattista Castagna, future Pope Urban VII, who served as a datary. Discussions broke down due to France's excessive claims.

On 18 September 1551 Pope Julius III gave him the Palace of Sant'Apollinare alle Terme Neroniane-Alessandrine (though not the church property) ad vitam. From 1552 to 1553, he was Prefect of the Apostolic Signatura and a member of the Roman Inquisition. He opted for the titular church of San Marcello al Corso on 29 November 1553.

He was a participant in both the papal conclave of April 1555 that elected Pope Marcellus II and the papal conclave of May 1555 that elected Pope Paul IV.

He died in Rome on 10 October 1555 and was buried in the Basilica di Sant'Agostino.
