= Giacomo Savelli =

Giacomo Savelli may refer to:

- Pope Honorius IV (died 1287), born Giacomo Savelli
- Giacomo Savelli (died 1587), cardinal
