= Cristoforo Guidalotti Ciocchi del Monte =

Italian Roman Catholic bishop and cardinal

- Cardinal-Priest of Santa Prassede
- Church: Catholic Church
- See: Santa Prassede
- In office: 4 December 1551 – 27 October 1564
- Predecessor: Miguel da Silva
- Successor: Charles Borromeo
- Other post: Bishop of Cagli (1525-1550, 1556-1564)
- Previous posts: Bishop of Marseille (1550-1556); Titular Archbishop of Alexandria (1550-1552); Titular Bishop of Bethleem (1517-1525)

Orders
- Created cardinal: 20 November 1551 by Pope Julius III

Personal details
- Born: 1484 Arezzo, Republic of Florence
- Died: 27 October 1564 (aged 79–80) Sant’Angelo in Vado, Duchy of Urbino

Cristoforo Guidalotti Ciocchi del Monte (1484–1564) was an Italian Roman Catholic bishop and cardinal. On his mother's side, he was a first cousin of Pope Julius III.

== Biography ==
Cristoforo Guidalotti Ciocchi del Monte was born in Arezzo in 1484, the son of Cecco di Cristofano Guidalotti, a patrician of Perugia, and Margherita Ciocchi del Monte. After the premature death of their father, he and his brothers Pietro, Federico, Fabiano and sister Laura were placed under the guardianship of their uncle, Cardinal Antonio Maria Ciocchi del Monte, at whose wish they assumed his surname.

As a young man, he travelled to Rome and studied under his uncle Cardinal Antonio Maria Ciocchi del Monte, becoming a doctor in "utroque iure" (civil and canon law). Through a preferment from his uncle, he became archpriest of Sant'Angelo in Vado.

On 21 August 1517, he was elected titular Bishop of Bethlehem, a position previously held by his cousin Gaspare Antonio del Monte. He was transferred to the Diocese of Cagli e Pergola on 10 February 1525, and later to the Diocese of Marseille on 27 June 1550. On 20 October 1550, he became titular Patriarch of Alexandria, while retaining the Diocese of Marseille. He resigned the patriarchate sometime before 8 January 1552.

His cousin Pope Julius III made him a cardinal priest in the consistory of 20 November 1551. He received the red hat and on 4 December 1551 the titular church of Santa Prassede, which had previously been held by both his uncle and cousin.

As cardinal, he was a participant in both the papal conclave of April 1555 that elected Pope Marcellus II and the papal conclave of May 1555 that elected Pope Paul IV.

With the death of Canon Giovanni Ciocchi del Monte, the Diocese of Cagli became vacant. Cardinal Cristoforo resigned from the Diocese of Marseille to resume Cagli on 9 March 1556. He returned to Rome for the funeral of Paul IV and participated in the papal conclave of 1559 that elected Pope Pius IV.

He died in Rome on 27 October 1564 and was buried in Sant'Angelo in Vado.

== External links and additional sources ==
- Cheney, David M. "Diocese of Cagli e Pergola". Catholic-Hierarchy.org.^{self-published}
- Chow, Gabriel. "Diocese of Cagli". GCatholic.org.^{self-published}
