= Scipione Rebiba =

Italian Catholic cardinal (1504–1577)

His Eminence Scipione Rebiba
- Cardinal-Bishop of Sabina
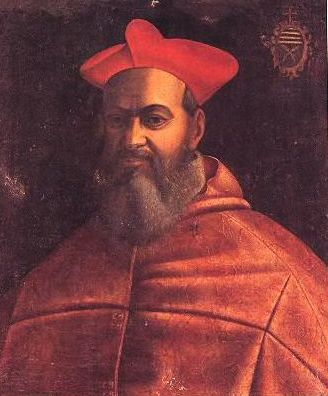
- Portrait, 16th cent.
- Archdiocese: Constantinople
- See: Constantinople
- Elected: 16 March 1541
- Term ended: 23 July 1577
- Predecessor: Giovanni Ricci
- Successor: Giacomo Savelli
- Previous posts: Auxiliary Bishop of Chieti (1541–1551); Titular Bishop of Amyclae (1541–1551); Bishop of Mottola (1551–1556); Cardinal-Priest of S. Pudenziana (1556–1565); Archbishop of Pisa (1556–1560); Archbishop of Troia (1560); Cardinal-Priest of S. Anastasia (1565–1566); Titular Patriarch of Constantinople (1565–1573); Cardinal-Priest of S. Angelo in Pescheria (1566–1570); Cardinal-Priest of S. Maria in Trastevere (1570–1573); Cardinal-Bishop of Albano (1573–1574)

Orders
- Ordination: 1528 by Archbishop Giovanni Carandolet
- Consecration: 14 May 1541 by unknown
- Created cardinal: 20 December 1555 by Pope Paul IV
- Rank: Cardinal-Bishop

Personal details
- Born: Scipione Rebiba; 3 February 1504 San Marco d’Alunzio
- Died: 23 July 1577 (aged 73)
- Denomination: Roman Catholic
- Coat of arms: Scipione Rebiba's coat of arms

Scipione Rebiba (3 February 1504 – 23 July 1577) was an Italian prelate of the Catholic Church, a protégé of Gian Pietro Carafa, who became Pope Paul IV. He held a variety of positions in the Church hierarchy, including some of the most senior. He introduced the Inquisition to Naples in the 1550s and became a cardinal in 1555. He is mostly known today for having been the earliest bishop to whom most Latin Catholic bishops – including the current pope Leo XIV – can trace their apostolic succession, as it is currently unknown who consecrated Rebiba.

== Biography ==
Ordination history of Scipione Rebiba
History
Episcopal consecration
- Date: 14 May 1541
Cardinalate
- Elevated by: Pope Marcellus II
- Date: 20 December 1555
Episcopal succession
Bishops consecrated by Scipione Rebiba as principal consecrator
- Giulio Antonio Santorio: 12 March 1566
- Tiberio Carafa: 26 May 1566
- Francesco Rusticucci: 21 September 1566
- Arcangelo de' Bianchi: 21 September 1566
- Egidio Valenti: 28 October 1566
- Carlo Carafa: 1 June 1567
- Marco Landi: 14 September 1567
- Umberto Locati: 25 April 1568
- Gonzalo Herrera Olivares: 25 July 1568
- Paul Burali d’Arezzo: 1 August 1568
- Organtino Scaroli: 16 April 1569
- Gregorio Cruz: 16 April 1569
- Cesare Ferrante: 16 April 1569
- Eustachio Locatelli: 29 April 1569
- Giovanni Aldobrandini: 8 December 1569
- Vincenzo Ercolano: 8 January 1570
- Donato Stampa: 8 January 1570
- Aurelio Griani: 19 November 1570
- Giovanni Domenico Rebiba: 19 November 1570
- Maurice MacBrien: 7 October 1571
- Vincenzo de Doncelli: 7 October 1571
- Pietro Cancellieri: 7 October 1571
- Cornelio Firmano: 21 February 1574

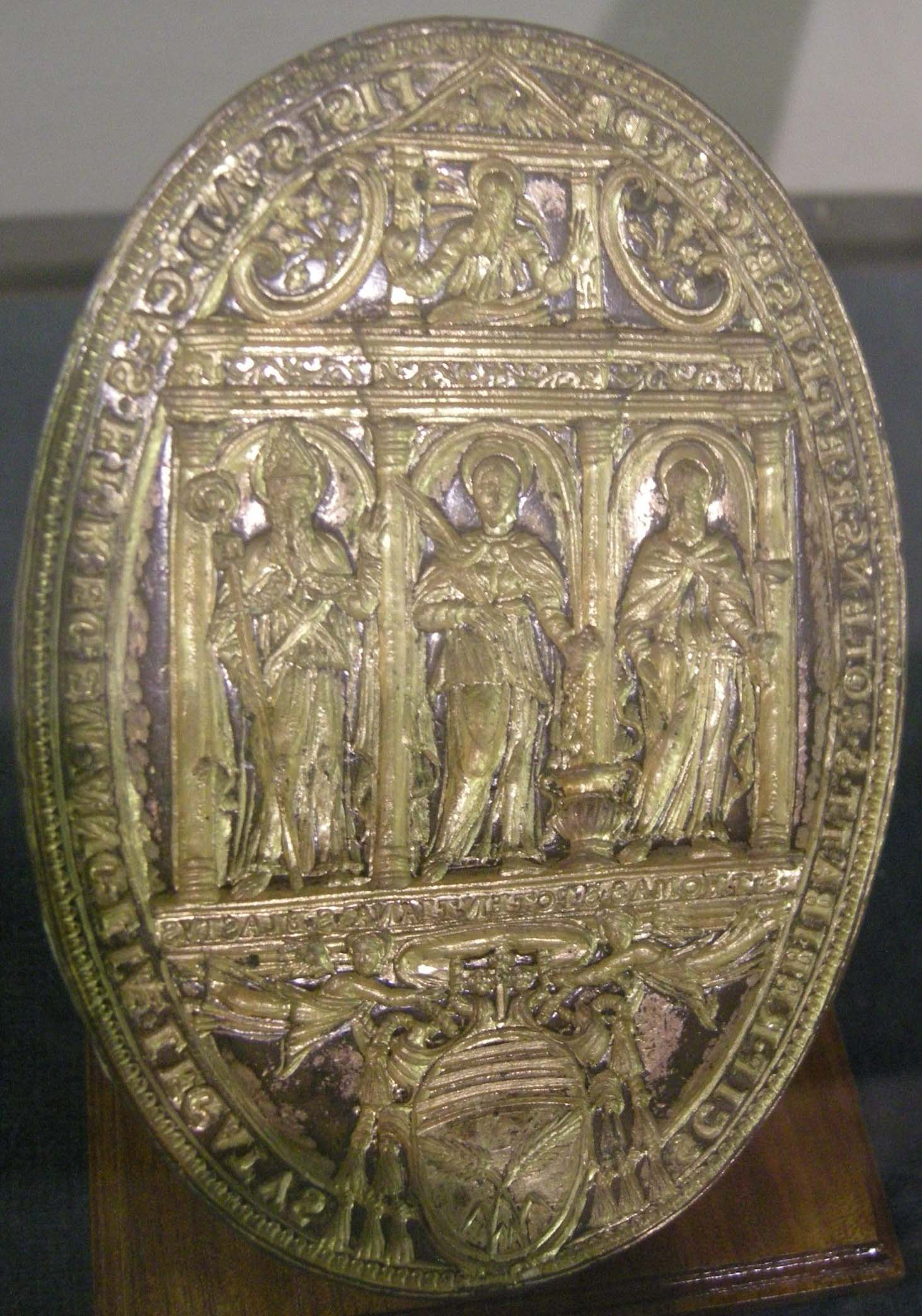
Seal of Cardinal Scipione Rebiba, c. 1556

Scipione Rebiba was born on 3 February 1504 in the village of San Marco d'Alunzio, in Sicily. He studied in Palermo and enjoyed a benefice in the Church of S. Maria dei Miracoli.

On 16 March 1541, on the recommendation of Bishop Gian Pietro Carafa, Pope Paul III appointed Rebiba titular Bishop of Amyclae so he could serve as Carafa's auxiliary bishop in the Diocese of Chieti.

On 22 February 1549, Pope Paul III named Carafa Archbishop of Naples, but Emperor Charles V prevented him from taking possession of that see until July 1551. Carafa, who was active in Rome as one of the six cardinals of the Roman Inquisition (1542–1555), appointed Rebiba as his vicar to administer the diocese on his behalf. Rebiba was also promoted from auxiliary and on 12 October 1551 made Bishop of Motula, a see in the Kingdom of Naples. With the full support of the head of the Inquisition in Rome, Rebiba introduced the Roman Inquisition into Naples and was granted the office of Commissary of the Roman Inquisition.

Carafa was elected pope on 23 May 1555 and named Rebiba Governor of Rome on 5 July. He served only a few months, until the next consistory for the elevation of cardinals on 20 December, where he was made a cardinal. (Note: He was initially assigned the Church of S. Prudenziana as his titular church which he held until 7 February 1565, when he was translated to the Church of S. Anastasia. The assignment of titular churches was significant for the prestige of a particular church as well as the income made available to the title holder.)

In 13 April 1556, Paul IV appointed Rebiba Archbishop of Pisa and Rebiba took possession of that see on 29 April 1556.

In 1557, Cardinal Giovanni Morone was arrested and imprisoned on orders of Paul IV. He was charged with heresy and dealing with Lutherans. Paul IV appointed Rebiba to a committee of five cardinals to examine Morone. They found Morone innocent, but Pope Paul issued a bull rejecting the committee's findings and Morone was kept in prison until, after the pope's death in 1559, the College of Cardinals ordered his release.

In 1559, the newly elected Pope Pius IV authorized the arrest of persons accused of various crimes during the administration of Paul IV, including his predecessor's nephew Cardinal Carlo Carafa and Rebiba, who were imprisoned in Castel San Angelo. Rebiba was eventually released, Carafa was strangled on the order of Pius IV on 4 March 1561.

In 1565 he was given the title Patriarch of Constantinople, which he held until 1573.

On 7 October 1566, Rebiba opted to accept the rank of Cardinal Priest and chose as his titular church the Church of S. Angelo in Pescheria. (Note: Since the church had the rank of a deaconry, it was temporarily raised to the rank of a titular church for a cardinal priest. His relationship with that church lasted until 3 July 1570, when he opted for the title of Santa Maria in Trastevere.)

Rebiba participated in the conclave of 1565–1566 that followed the death of Pius IV and elected Cardinal Michael Ghislieri as Pope Pius V. He also voted in the conclave of 1572, which followed the death of Pius V and elected Pope Gregory XIII.

Rebiba was appointed Bishop of Albano on 8 April 1573 and Bishop of Sabina in 1574.

Rebiba died in Rome on 23 July 1577 and was interred in the Church of S. Silvestro on the Quirinal. At the time of his death he was Prefect of the Office of the Holy Inquisition. His memorial monument describes him as "Inquisitor into heretical depravity, a most fierce fighter for the orthodox faith".

== Episcopal succession ==
In the early 18th century, Pope Benedict XIII, whose holy orders were descended from Rebiba's consecration of Giulio Antonio Santorio, personally consecrated at least 139 bishops for various important European sees, including German, French, English and New World bishops. These bishops in turn consecrated bishops almost exclusively for their respective countries. Therefore, Rebiba is part of the episcopal lineage of Pope Leo XIV and nearly 95% of Catholic bishops alive today. The last pope who did not have his apostolic succession derived from Rebiba is Pope Innocent XII (a member of Guillaume d'Estouteville's line) who died on 27 September 1700.

Since there are no known surviving records of who consecrated him, most Latin Catholic bishops can trace their episcopal lineage only as far back as Rebiba.

Although there is no knowledge of who consecrated Rebiba as bishop, records indicate that it was done 14 May, 1541. It has been speculated the records pertaining to his episcopal consecration and those immediately preceding him in office were destroyed in a fire in Chieti, the city east of Rome where Rebiba first became auxiliary bishop.

== Notes ==
Records
Preceded by Giovanni Ricci	Oldest living Member of the Sacred College; 3 May 1574 – 23 July 1577	Succeeded by Stanislaw Hozjusz
