= Girolamo Recanati Capodiferro =

Italian bishop and cardinal

Girolamo Recanati Capodiferro (22 June 1502 – 1 December 1559) was an Italian Roman Catholic bishop and cardinal.

== Biography ==
Girolamo Recanati Capodiferro was born in Rome on 22 June 1502, the son of Alfonso Recanati and Bernardina Capodiferro, Roman patricians.

At a young age, he was admitted to the court of Cardinal Alessandro Farnese, seniore, the future Pope Paul III. Pope Clement VII appointed him to several positions in the Roman Curia and gave him several nunciatures. Pope Paul III made him nuncio to the Kingdom of Portugal in 1541, and later that same year to the Kingdom of France to announce the calling of the Council of Trent. He was a datary from 1541 to 1544. In 1541, he also served as treasurer of the Apostolic Camera. He was the cardinal who announced what measures the Papal States would take to defend itself against possible attack by the Ottoman Empire.

On 6 February 1542 he was elected Bishop of Nice. Before he took possession of the see, on 30 July 1544, he was transferred to the Diocese of Saint-Jean-de-Maurienne.

Upon the recommendation of Cardinal Jacopo Sadoleto, Pope Paul III made him a cardinal deacon in the consistory of 19 December 1544. He received the red hat and the deaconry of San Giorgio in Velabro on 8 January 1545.

On 26 August 1545 the pope appointed him papal legate in Romagna. He was on 25 February 1547 named legate to Francis I of France to request that French bishops be allowed to travel to Bologna, where the Council of Trent had been moved. He returned to France a second time that year to propose a marriage between a French princess and the pope's natural son; Francis I did not look favorably upon this request.

He participated in the papal conclave of 1549-50 that elected Pope Julius III. The new pope appointed him as legate in Romagna for a second time. He was a participant in the papal conclave of April 1555 that elected Pope Marcellus II; the papal conclave of May 1555 that elected Pope Paul IV; and the papal conclave of 1559 that elected Pope Pius IV.

He died during the 1559 papal conclave, on 1 December 1559. He was buried in Santa Maria della Pace.
