= Pietro Tagliavia d'Aragonia =

Italian Roman Catholic bishop and cardinal

Pietro Tagliavia d'Aragonia (died 1558) was an Italian Roman Catholic bishop and cardinal.

== Biography ==
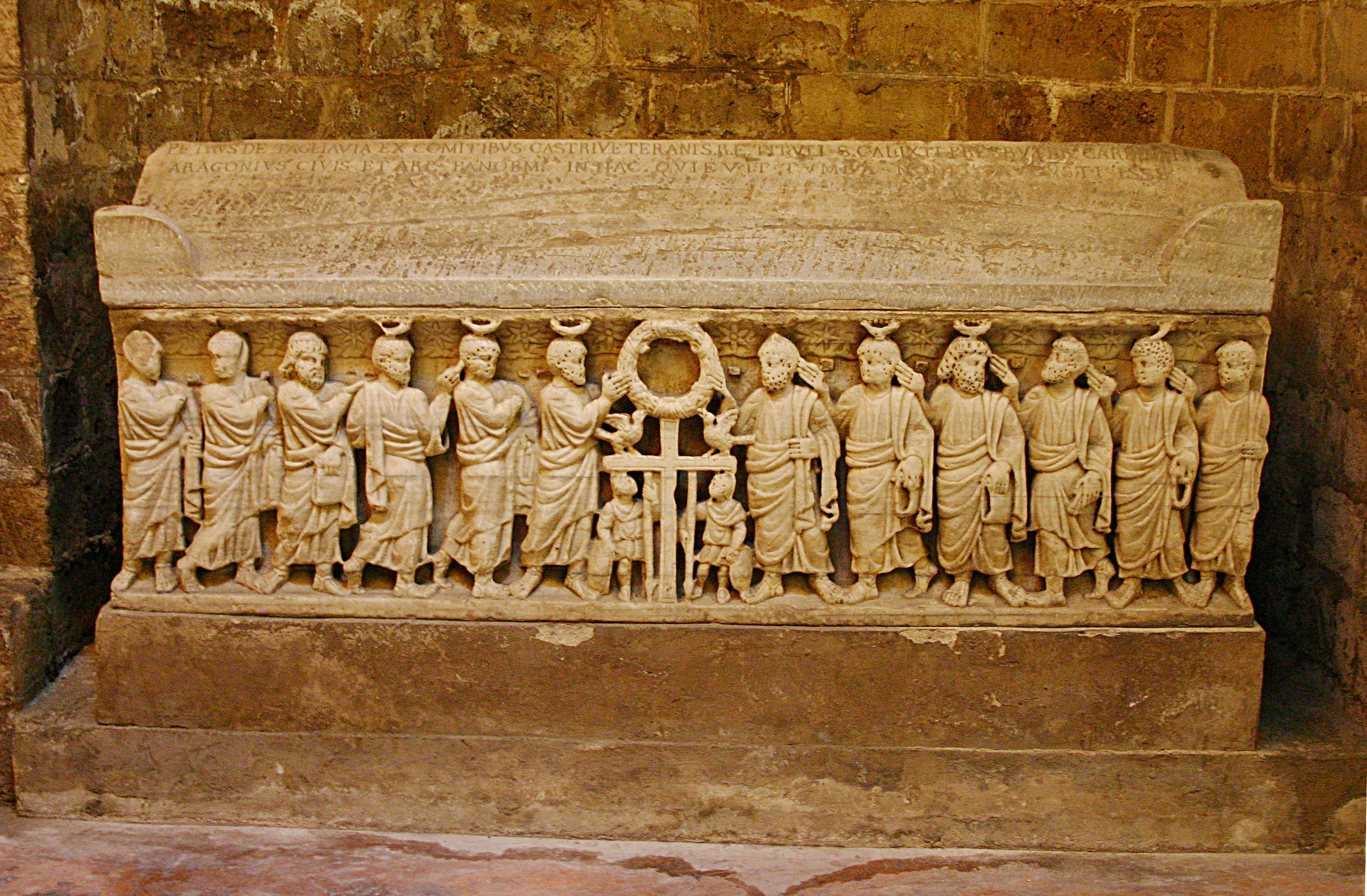
Tomb of Pietro Tagliavia d'Aragonia in the Cathedral of Palermo.

Pietro Tagliavia d'Aragonia was born in Palermo ca. 1500, the son of Giovanni Vincenzo Tagliavia, count of Castelvecchio and Beatrice d'Aragonia e Cruillas.

Early in his career, he was a cleric in Mazara del Vallo.

On 28 May 1537 he was elected Bishop of Agrigento, receiving the indult to receive episcopal consecration on 6 June 1537. He was promoted to the metropolitan see of Palermo on 10 October 1544. As a bishop, he participated in the Council of Trent from 1545 to 1547 and in 1551–52.

Pope Julius III made him a cardinal priest in the consistory of 22 December 1553. He was not a participant in the papal conclave of April 1555 that elected Pope Marcellus II, but he did participate in the papal conclave of May 1555 that elected Pope Paul IV. He received the red hat and the titular church of San Callisto on 17 July 1555.

He died in Palermo on 5 August 1558. He was buried in Palermo Cathedral.

== External links and additional sources ==
- Cheney, David M. "Archdiocese of Agrigento". Catholic-Hierarchy.org. (for Chronology of Bishops)^{[self-published]}
- Chow, Gabriel. "Metropolitan Archdiocese of Agrigento (Italy)". GCatholic.org. (for Chronology of Bishops) ^{[self-published]}

Catholic Church titles
Preceded by Giuliano Cibò	Bishop of Agrigento; 1537–1544	Succeeded by Rodolfo Pio
Preceded by Giovanni Carandolet	Bishop of Palermo; 1544–1558	Succeeded by Francisco Orozco de Arce
