= Giacomo Puteo =

Spanish Roman Catholic bishop and cardinal

Giacomo Puteo (1495–1563) was a Spanish Roman Catholic bishop and cardinal.

== Biography ==
Giacomo Puteo was born in Majorca on 13 February 1495, the son of noble Antoni del Pozzo (from Nice, native of Alessandria, Piedmont) and Praxedis Berard i Caulelles. He was educated at the University of Bologna, becoming a doctor of both laws.

After university, he went to Rome and became auditor of Cardinal Pietro Accolti. During the pontificate of Pope Paul III, he became an auditor of the Roman Rota, a post he held for fifteen years, ultimately becoming Dean of the Roman Rota.

On 18 April 1550 he was elected Archbishop of Bari. He never visited his archdiocese.

Pope Julius III made him a cardinal priest in the consistory of 20 November 1551. He received the red hat and the titular church of San Simeon in Posterula on 4 December 1551.

He was a participant in both the papal conclave of April 1555 that elected Pope Marcellus II and the papal conclave of May 1555 that elected Pope Paul IV. On 29 May 1555 he opted for the titular church of Santa Maria in Via Lata. During the pontificate of Pope Paul IV, he was Prefect of the Apostolic Signatura; a member of the Supreme Sacred Congregation of the Holy Office; and was cardinal protector of both the Kingdom of Poland and the Sovereign Military Order of Malta. Together with Cardinal Giovanni Battista Cicala, he was charged with examining abolishing the alienation of ecclesiastical patrimony done against the constitution of Pope Paul II.

He participated in the papal conclave of 1559 that elected Pope Pius IV. He participated in the planning of the Council of Trent and was an active proponent of the Counter-Reformation. In 1561, he was named a papal legate to the Council of Trent, though his health did not permit him to attend the council. On 16 December 1562 he resigned the government of Bari in favor of his nephew Antonio del Pozzo.

He died in Rome on 26 April 1563. He was buried in Santa Maria sopra Minerva.
