= Giovanni Poggio =

Italian cardinal and bishop (1493–1556)

His Eminence Giovanni Poggi
- Bishop emeritus of Tropea
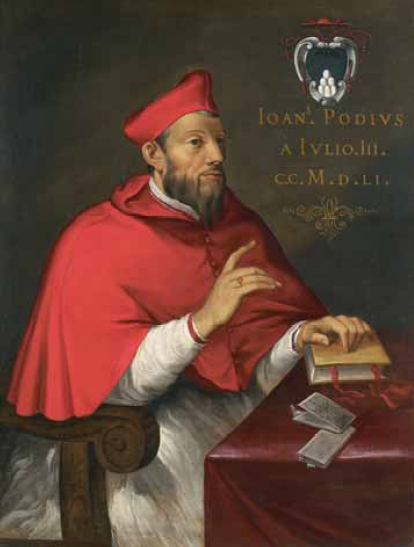
- A portrait of Poggio in 1551, shortly after his appointment as cardinal
- Province: Reggio
- Diocese: Tropea
- Appointed: 4 October 1541
- Term ended: 6 February 1556
- Predecessor: Girolamo Ghinucci
- Successor: Gian Matteo di Luchi
- Other posts: Apostolic Nuncio to Spain (1529–1541); Cardinal Priest of Sant'Anastasia (1552–1556)

Orders
- Consecration: 1541
- Created cardinal: 23 March 1552
- Rank: Cardinal Priest

Personal details
- Born: 26 January 1493 Commune of Bologna
- Died: 12 February 1556 (aged 63) Commune of Bologna
- Denomination: Roman Catholic
- Residence: Commune of Bologna
- Spouse: name unknown (died 1528)
- Children: names unknown

Giovanni Poggio (also written Poggi) (21 January 1493 – 12 February 1556) was an Italian Roman Catholic bishop and cardinal. He is mainly known for the elaborate decorations he arranged for his residence, the Palazzo Poggi.

== Early years ==
Poggio was born in Bologna on 21 January 1493, the son of Cristoforo Poggio and Francesca Quistelli. He was married and had several children, becoming a cleric in minor orders only after his wife's death in 1528.

Pope Paul III appointed Poggio as a protonotary apostolic and treasurer of the Apostolic Camera.

From July 1529 to January 1535, Poggio was the nuncio to the Royal Court of Spain. From January 1535 to July 1537, he served as nuncio, residing in Madrid (with Giovanni Guidiccione serving as nuncio at the royal court). He was nuncio to the royal court again from July 1537 to March 1541.

== Bishop ==
Poggio was appointed Bishop of Tropea on 4 October 1541. He appointed a Vicar General to administer the diocese, since he was again nuncio to Spain from September 1541 to December 1551. From the 1540s until 1551 Poggi was papal nuncio at the Spanish court of the Charles V, Holy Roman Emperor.

In 1554, Pope Julius III dispatched him to attempt to convince Francis Borgia, a ranking Spanish nobleman who had recently renounced his position to enter the Society of Jesus, to accept a cardinal's hat, but Borgia refused.

In November 1548 Prince Philip of Spain, son of King Charles V of Spain, made a triumphal entry into Genoa en route from Spain to the Spanish Netherlands. As nuncio, Poggio was among the dignitaries who accompanied him.

As was normal at the time, Poggio accepted loans from the Olivieri banking house, leading financiers of the city. Given his important positions as nuncio to Spain and general treasurer, the amounts lent to him were unusually large.

== Cardinal ==
At the request of Charles V, Holy Roman Emperor, Pope Julius III made Poggio a Cardinal Priest in the consistory of 20 November 1551. He received the red hat and the titular church of Sant'Anastasia on 23 March 1552. From December 1551 to March 1553, he was legate a latere in Spain.

In January 1552 he successfully defended the Jesuits against attempts by Archbishop Juan Martínez y Siliceo of Toledo to suppress that Order.

Poggio was a participant in the papal conclave of April 1555 that elected Pope Marcellus II. He also participated in the papal conclave of May 1555 in which Giovanni Pietro Carafa was elected Pope, taking the name Pope Paul IV. Poggio initially resisted the election, but was eventually persuaded by Cardinal Alessandro Farnese.

Poggio resigned the government of his see in favour of his nephew Giovanni Matteo di Lucchi, Bishop of Ancona on 6 February 1556. He died in Bologna six days later, 12 February 1556, and was buried in the Augustinian Church of San Giacomo Maggiore there.

== Palace and chapel ==
Construction of the Palazzo Poggi in Bologna for Giovanni Poggi and his brother began in 1549. Cardinal Poggi met Pellegrino Tibaldi after the painter moved to Rome in 1547, and later commissioned him to paint the Palazzo Poggi. Tibaldi, a native of Bologna, returned to the city in 1555 and painted frescos for the Cardinal in his palace and family chapel. This work is considered Tibaldi's masterpiece. In the Poggi Chapel in the Church of San Giacomo Maggiore, there are two portraits by Tibaldi of Cardinal Poggi, one on each side of the altar. The one on the left shows him as papal nuncio to Spain, while the one on the right shows him later in his career, as a cardinal.

In 1714 the Palazzo Poggi, the Cardinal's private residence, became the House of the Instituto dell Scienze, and it is still one of the main buildings of the University of Bologna.
