= Giacomo Savelli (died 1587) =

Italian Roman Catholic cardinal and bishop

His Eminence Giacomo Savelli
- Cardinal-Bishop of Porto–Santa Rufina
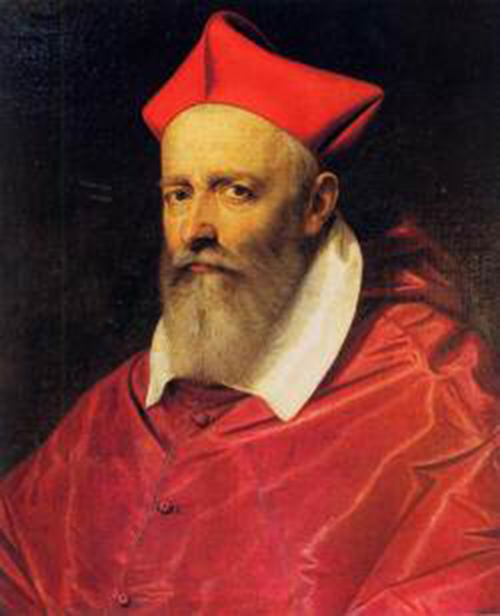
- Portrait by Scipione Pulzone, c. 1580
- Church: Catholic Church
- Appointed: 4 January 1587
- Term ended: 5 December 1587
- Predecessor: Fulvio Giulio della Corgna
- Successor: Giovanni Antonio Serbelloni
- Other posts: Vicar-General of Rome (1560-1587)
- Previous posts: See list: Cardinal-Deacon of Santa Lucia in Selci (1540–1543); Cardinal-Deacon of Santi Cosma e Damiano (1543-1552); Cardinal-Deacon of Santa Maria in Cosmedin (1558-1573); Cardinal-Bishop of Sabina (1577-1578)

Orders
- Ordination: 19 January 1560
- Consecration: 30 January 1584 by Giulio Antonio Santorio
- Created cardinal: 19 December 1539 by Pope Paul III
- Rank: Cardinal-Bishop

Personal details
- Born: 28 October 1523 Rome, Papal States
- Died: 5 December 1587 (aged 64) Rome, Papal States
- Buried: Church of the Gesù
- Coat of arms

Giacomo Savelli (1523–1587) was an Italian Roman Catholic cardinal and bishop. He participated in several papal conclaves and held several administrative positions in the Catholic Church during his 48-year career with the Church during the mid-16th century.

== Early life ==
A member of the Savelli family, Giacomo Savelli was born in Rome in 1523, the son of Roman nobles Giambattista Savelli and Costanza Bentivoglio. His paternal grandmother, Camilla Farnese, was a cousin of Pope Paul III.

Savelli studied Latin and Greek as a young man and then attended the University of Padua to study law. He joined the papal household of Pope Paul III as a chamberlain of honor. He also served as a protonotary apostolic.

== Clerical career ==
Pope Paul III made him a cardinal deacon in the consistory of 19 December 1539. He received the red hat and the deaconry of Santa Lucia in Selci on 16 April 1540. On 8 January 1543 he opted for the deaconry of Santi Cosma e Damiano. From 13 April 1545 to 26 May 1546 he was the administrator of the see of Teramo.

He participated in the papal conclave of 1549-50 that elected Pope Julius III. The new pope made Cardinal Savelli papal legate in the March of Ancona and he served in that position throughout the pontificate of Julius III. He opted for the deaconry of San Nicola in Carcere on 9 March 1552.

He participated in both the papal conclave of April 1555 that elected Pope Marcellus II and the papal conclave of May 1555 that elected Pope Paul IV.

He was the administrator of the see of Gubbio from 29 May 1555 until 6 February 1556, when he resigned the administration in favor of his nephew Marino Savelli, bishop-elect of Nicastro. Cardinal Savelli became administrator of Nicastro for a second time starting 6 February 1556, resigning sometime before 26 January 1560.

On 16 December 1558 he opted for the deaconry of Santa Maria in Cosmedin. In 1559, he participated in the papal conclave that elected Pope Pius IV.

He was ordained as a priest on 19 January 1560, and he opted for the order of cardinal priests at that time. From 26 January 1560 until 17 May 1574 he was administrator of the see of Benevento. He was also the Vicar General of Rome from 1560 to 1587. On 27 June 1571 he was one of three cardinals appointed by the pope to study providing assistance for the poor of Rome. He participated in the papal conclave of 1565-66 that elected Pope Pius V. He served as Camerlengo of the Sacred College of Cardinals from 14 January 1568 until 14 January 1569. He was a participant in the papal conclave of 1572 that elected Pope Gregory XIII. On 8 April 1573 he opted for the titular church of Santa Maria in Trastevere.

== Later life and death ==
On 31 July 1577 he opted for the order of cardinal bishops, receiving the suburbicarian see of Sabina. He opted for the suburbicarian see of Porto e Santa Rufina. During this period, he was the Vice-Dean of the College of Cardinals.

In 1585, he attended the papal conclave that elected Pope Sixtus V. He died in Rome on 5 December 1587. He was buried in the Church of the Gesù.
