= Giovanni Battista Cicala =

Italian Roman Catholic bishop and cardinal

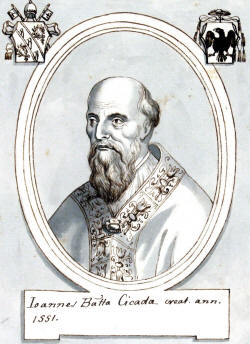
Giovanni Battista Cicala

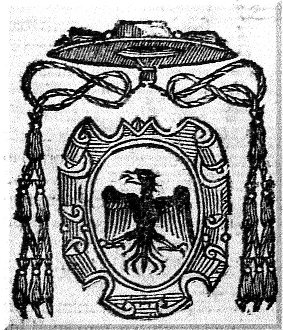
Coat of arms of Cardinal Giovanni Battista Cicala

Giovanni Battista (or Giambattista) Cicala (1510–1570) was an Italian Roman Catholic bishop and cardinal.

== Biography ==
Giovanni Battista Cicala was born in Genoa on 6 June 1510, the son of Edoardo Cicala. His family was related to the Cybo and Doria families. He studied under his relative Odoardo Cicala, who later became Bishop of Sagona.

Cicala moved to Rome, where he was named Referendary of the Apostolic Signatura. On 2 September 1535 he was appointed an abbreviator of apostolic letters. From 8 March 1540 until 1551 he was an auditor of the Apostolic Camera.

On 5 December 1543 he was named administrator of the see of Albenga, while retaining the office of auditor. He was consecrated as a bishop on 21 December 1543 in the Sistine Chapel. On 13 January 1547 he arrived at the Council of Trent.

Pope Julius III made him a cardinal priest in the consistory of 20 November 1551. He received the red hat and the titular church of San Clemente on 4 December 1551. On 13 March 1553 he was named papal legate in Campagna. He resigned the administration of Albenga on 30 March 1554, in favor of his nephew Carlo Cicala. He was administrator of the see of Mariana from 30 March 1554 until 13 September 1560, when he resigned in favor of his nephew Nicola Cicala.

He was a participant in the papal conclave of April 1555 that elected Pope Marcellus II; the papal conclave of May 1555 that elected Pope Paul IV; and the papal conclave of 1559 that elected Pope Pius IV.

With Cardinals Giovanni Michele Saraceni and Gianbernardino Scotti, he was charged with resolving a dispute between the Canons Regular of the Lateran and the Benedictines of Monte Cassino, resolving the issue in favor of the former. He was administrator of the see of Sagona from 1565 to 1567. He opted for the titular church of Sant'Agata dei Goti on 7 November 1565.

He participated in the papal conclave of 1565-66 that elected Pope Pius V.

In 1567, he replaced Cardinal Michele Bonelli as the man in charge of examining the cause for the canonization of Diego di San Nicola. On 30 April 1568 he opted for the order of cardinal bishops, receiving the suburbicarian see of Sabina.

He died in Rome on 8 April 1570. He was buried in Santa Maria del Popolo.
