= Tommaso Badia =

Italian Dominican cardinal

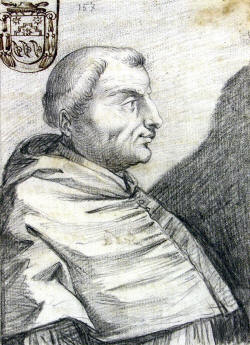
Tommaso Badia

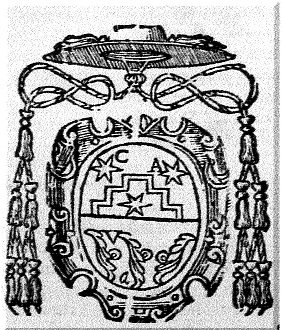
Coat of arms of Tommaso Badia

Tommaso Badia (1483 – 6 September 1547) was an Italian Dominican cardinal.

Badia was born in Modena in 1483. He contributed to the establishment of the Jesuits and was the theological advisor of cardinal Gasparo Contarini. Badia was disputant in Worms 1540 and Regensburg 1541. He was promoted cardinal by Pope Paul III on 2 June 1542 but did not accept the offer to be bishop of Urbino at the same time. Badia died in Rome on 6 September 1547.
