= Giovanni Ricci (bishop) =

Italian bishop and cardinal (1498-1574)

His Eminence Giovanni Ricci
- Cardinal-Bishop of Sabina
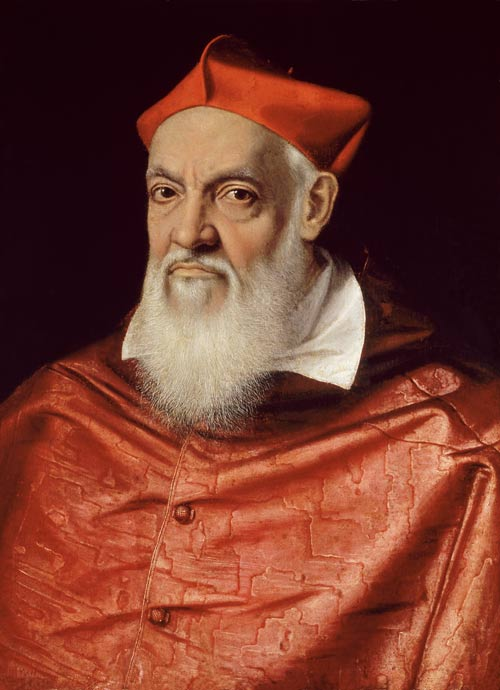
- Portrait by Scipione Pulzone
- Church: Catholic Church
- Appointed: 8 April 1573
- Term ended: 3 May 1574
- Predecessor: Giulio della Rovere
- Successor: Scipione Rebiba

Orders
- Created cardinal: 20 November 1551 by Pope Julius III
- Rank: Cardinal-Bishop

Personal details
- Born: 1 November 1498 Chiusi, Duchy of Florence
- Died: 3 May 1574 (aged 75) Rome, Papal States
- Buried: San Pietro in Montorio
- Coat of arms: Giovanni Ricci's coat of arms

Giovanni Ricci (1 November 1498 – 3 May 1574) was an Italian Roman Catholic bishop and cardinal.

== Biography ==
Giovanni Ricci was born in Chiusi on 1 November 1498, the son of Pietro Antonio Ricci. Disliking his stepmother, Giovanni Ricci traveled to Rome at age 15, seeking the protection of his father's friend Tarugi, a nobleman from Montepulciano, who could not convince the youth to return to Montepulciano. He later entered the court of Cardinal Giovanni Maria Ciocchi del Monte, the future Pope Julius III, as assistant to the master of chamber; he became the cardinal's master of chamber upon the death of the old master of chamber. He later entered the service of Cardinal Alessandro Farnese, iuniore. He was sent on diplomatic missions to the Kingdom of France and the Duchy of Burgundy, which he accomplished successfully.

He then entered the ecclesiastical estate and became a protonotary apostolic participantium. In 1542, he became a cleric in the Apostolic Camera. He was later to serve as apostolic collector for the Kingdom of Portugal, and nuncio to the Kingdom of France and to Austria.

On 25 June 1544, he was elected Archbishop of Manfredonia. From 27 June 1544 to 4 March 1550, he was nuncio to the Kingdom of Portugal (though he was unable to enter Lisbon until September 1545.) On 20 February, 1545, he was transferred to the see of Chiusi, though he was allowed to retain the title of archbishop ad personam.

Pope Julius III made him a cardinal priest in the consistory of 20 November 1551. He received the red hat and the titular church of San Vitale on 4 December 1551. He resigned the government of Chiusi sometime before 19 November 1554.

He was a participant in the papal conclave of April 1555 that elected Pope Marcellus II; the papal conclave of May 1555 that elected Pope Paul IV; and the papal conclave of 1559 that elected Pope Pius IV.

On 10 November 1561, he became administrator of the see of Montepulciano. He served as Camerlengo of the Sacred College of Cardinals from 30 January 1563 until 1564.

He participated in the papal conclave of 1565–66 that elected Pope Pius V. On 30 January, 1566, he opted for Sant'Angelo in Pescheria, a deaconry assigned as titulus, and then, on 7 October, 1566, for the titular church of Santa Maria in Trastevere. He was transferred to the metropolitan see of Pisa on 3 September 1567.

On 3 July 1570, he opted for the order of cardinal bishops, taking the suburbicarian see of Albano. He was a participant in the papal conclave of 1572 that elected Pope Gregory XIII. He opted for the suburbicarian see of Sabina on 8 April 1573.

He died in Rome on 3 May 1574. He was buried in San Pietro in Montorio.

Records
Preceded by Francesco Pisani	Oldest living Member of the Sacred College; 28 August 1570 - 3 May 1574	Succeeded by Scipione Rebiba
