= Juan Álvarez de Toledo =

Spanish cardinal (1488–1557)

Juan Álvarez de Toledo (15 July 1488 – 15 September 1557) was a Spanish Dominican and Cardinal, from 1538. Considered papabile in the papal conclave (1549–1550), he was initially running second in votes to Reginald Pole. He was again a candidate in 1555.

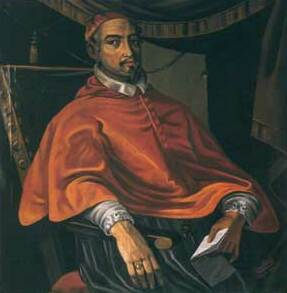
Juan Álvarez y Alva de Toledo.

He was an influential figure in the history of the University of Santiago de Compostela, sanctioning a division of lay from religious studies.

He was bishop of Córdoba in 1532, and bishop of Burgos in 1537. He was bishop of Albano in 1553, and bishop of Frascati in 1555.

His father was Fadrique Álvarez de Toledo, 2nd Duke of Alba, his brother Pedro Álvarez de Toledo, Marquis of Villafranca, viceroy of Naples.
