= Pope Julius III =

Head of the Catholic Church from 1550 to 1555

- Bishop of Rome
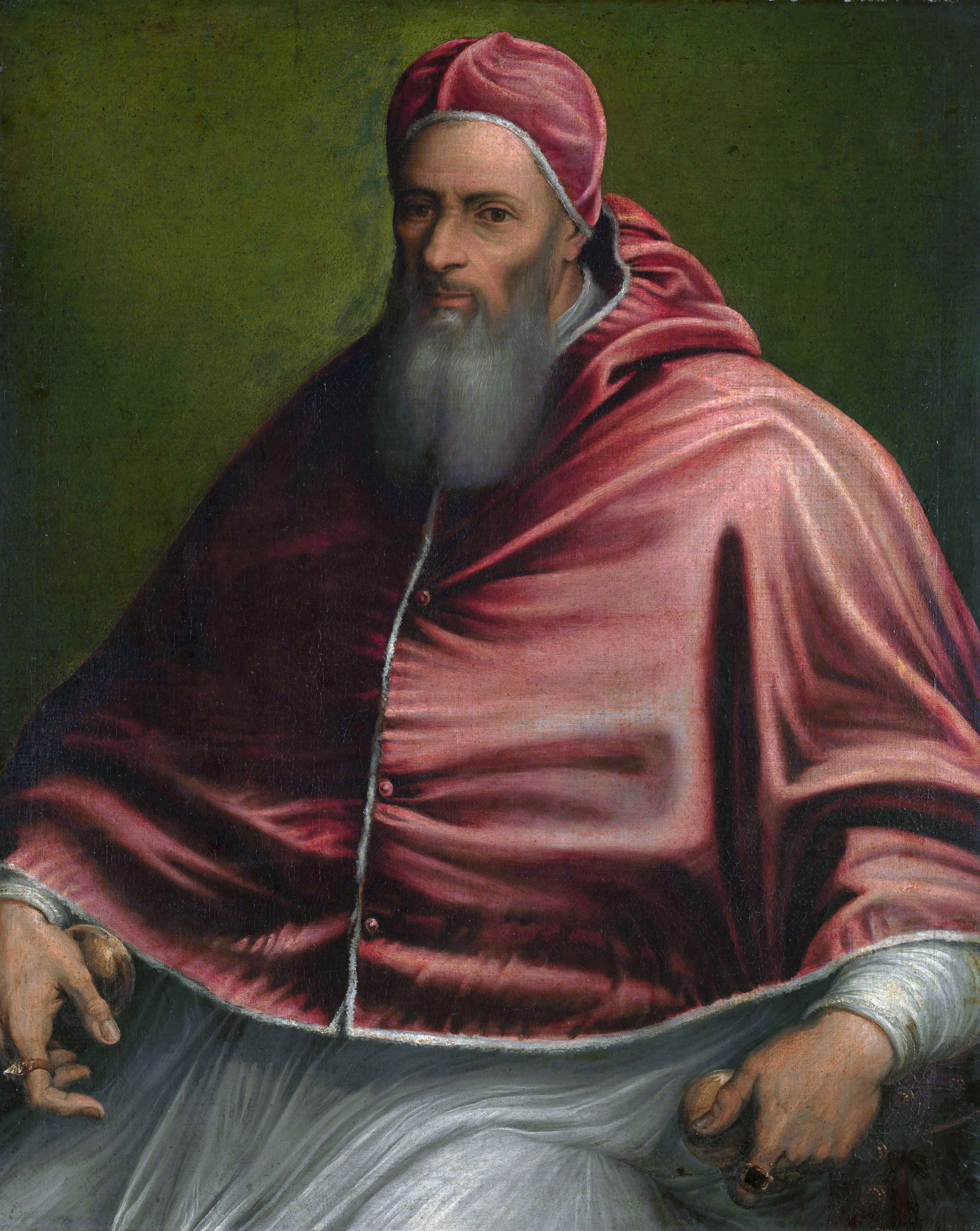
- Portrait by an artist in the circle of Girolamo Siciolante, c. 1550 (oil on canvas, 106 x 86 cm; Rijksmuseum)
- Church: Catholic Church
- Papacy began: 22 February 1550
- Papacy ended: 23 March 1555
- Predecessor: Paul III
- Successor: Marcellus II
- Previous posts: Archbishop of Manfredonia (1512–1544); Bishop of Pavia (1521–1530); Cardinal-Priest of San Vitale (1537–1542); Cardinal-Priest of Santa Prassede (1542–1543); Cardinal-Bishop of Palestrina (1543–1550)

Orders
- Ordination: 12 November 1512
- Consecration: 12 November 1514 by Antonio Maria Ciocchi del Monte
- Created cardinal: 22 December 1536 by Paul III

Personal details
- Born: Giovanni Maria Ciocchi del Monte; 10 September 1487 Monte San Savino, Republic of Siena
- Died: 23 March 1555 (aged 67) Rome, Papal States
- Signature: Julius III's signature

- Coat of arms: Julius III's coat of arms

Papal styles of Pope Julius III
- Reference style: His Holiness
- Spoken style: Your Holiness
- Religious style: Holy Father
- Posthumous style: None

Pope Julius III (Latin: Iulius PP. III; Italian: Giulio III; 10 September 1487 – 23 March 1555), born Giovanni Maria Ciocchi del Monte, was head of the Catholic Church and ruler of the Papal States from 22 February 1550 to his death, in March 1555.

After a career as a distinguished and effective diplomat, Julius was elected to the papacy as a compromise candidate after the death of Paul III. As pope, he made only reluctant and short-lived attempts at reform, mostly devoting himself to a life of personal pleasure. His reputation, and that of the Catholic Church, were greatly harmed by his scandal-ridden relationship with his adopted nephew, Innocenzo Ciocchi Del Monte. He is the most recent pope to take the pontifical name "Julius".

== Education and early career ==
Giovanni Maria Ciocchi del Monte was born in Monte San Savino, the son of a distinguished Roman jurist. He was educated by the humanist Raffaele Brandolini Lippo, and later studied law at Perugia and Siena. During his career, he distinguished himself as a brilliant canonist rather than as a theologian.

Del Monte was the nephew of Antonio Maria Ciocchi del Monte, Archbishop of Manfredonia (1506–1511). His uncle exchanged this see for a position as a Cardinal in 1511; Giovanni Maria Ciocchi del Monte succeeded to Manfredonia in 1513. In 1520, del Monte also became Bishop of Pavia. Popular for his affable manner and respected for his administrative skills, he was twice Prefect of Rome and was entrusted by the papal curia with several duties. At the Sack of Rome (1527) he was one of the hostages given by Pope Clement VII to the Emperor's forces, and barely escaped execution. Pope Paul III created him Cardinal-Priest of San Vitale on 22 December, 1536; and raised him to the dignity of cardinal-bishop with the Diocese of Palestrina on 5 October, 1543. He was employed by him in several important legations, notably as papal legate and first president of the Council of Trent (1545/47) and then at Bologna (1547/48).

== Papacy ==
=== Election ===
Paul III died on 10 November 1549, and in the ensuing conclave the forty-eight cardinals were divided into three factions: of the primary factions, the Imperial faction wished to see the Council of Trent reconvened, the French faction wished to see it dropped. The Farnese faction, loyal to the family of the previous Pope, supported the election of Paul III's grandson, Cardinal Alessandro Farnese, and also the family's claim to the Duchy of Parma, which was contested by Charles V, Holy Roman Emperor.

Neither the French nor the Germans favoured del Monte, and the Emperor had expressly excluded him from the list of acceptable candidates, but the French were able to block the other two factions, allowing del Monte to promote himself as a compromise candidate and be elected on 7 February 1550. Ottavio Farnese, whose support had been crucial to the election, was immediately confirmed as Duke of Parma. But, when Farnese applied to France for aid against the emperor, Julius allied himself with the emperor, declared Farnese deprived of his fief, and sent troops under the command of his nephew Giambattista del Monte to co-operate with governor Ferrante Gonzaga of Milan in the capture of Parma.

=== Church reforms ===
At the start of his reign Julius had seriously desired to bring about a reform of the Catholic Church and to reconvene the Council of Trent, but very little was actually achieved during his five years in office. In 1551, at the request of Emperor Charles V, he consented to the reopening of the Council of Trent and entered into a league against the duke of Parma and Henry II of France (1547–59), causing the War of Parma. However, Julius soon came to terms with the duke and France and in 1553 suspended the meetings of the council.

Henry had threatened to withdraw recognition from the Pope if the new Pope was pro-Habsburg in orientation, and when Julius III reconvened the Council of Trent, Henry blocked French bishops from attending and did not enforce the papal decrees in France. Even after Julius III suspended the council again he proceeded to bully the pope into taking his side against the Habsburgs by threatening schism.

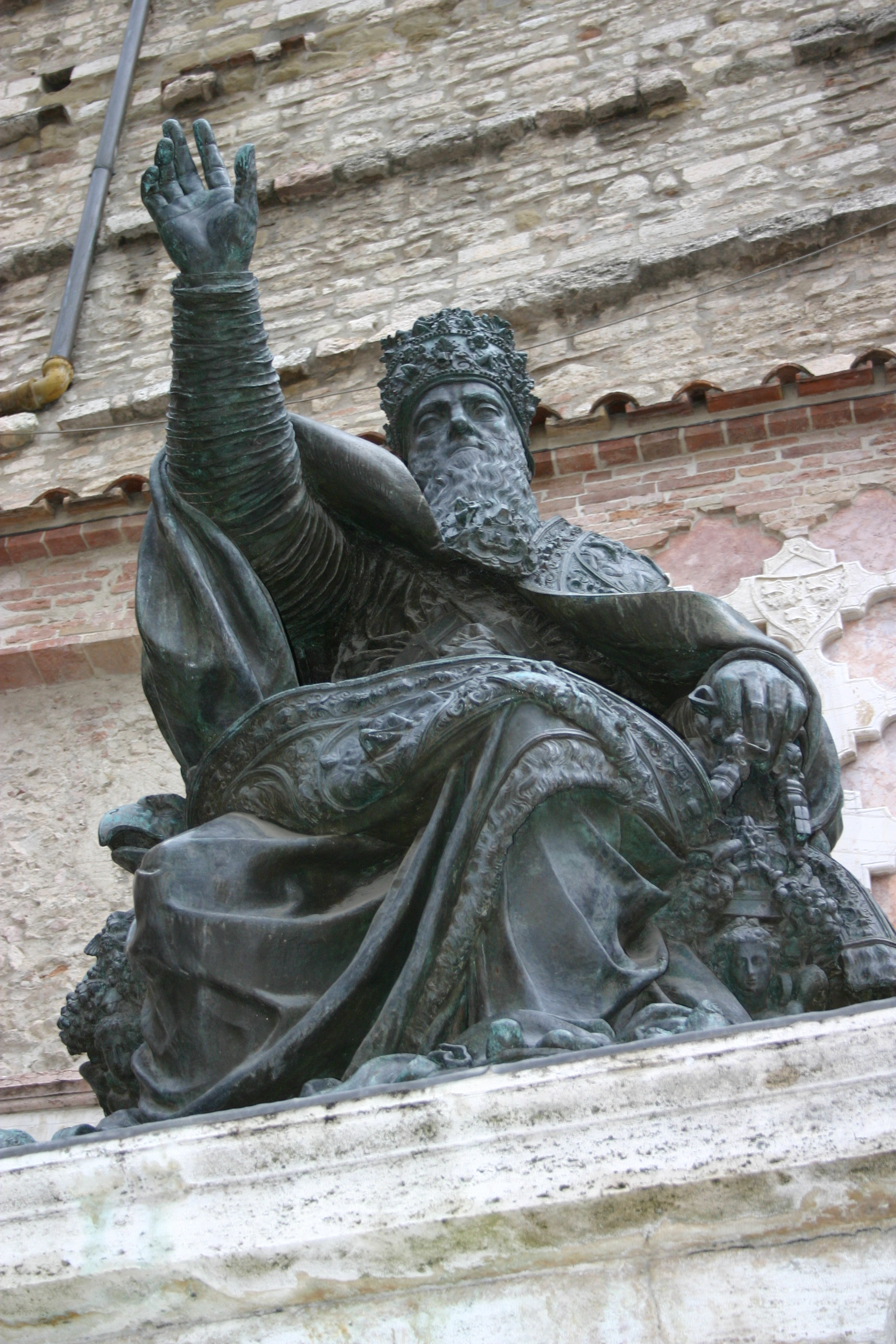
Bronze statue in Perugia, 1555

Julius increasingly contented himself with Italian politics and retired to his luxurious palace at the Villa Giulia, which he had built for himself close to the Porta del Popolo. From there he passed the time in comfort, emerging from time to time to make timid efforts to reform the Church through the reestablishment of the reform commissions. He was a friend of the Jesuits, to whom he granted a fresh confirmation in 1550; and through the papal bull, Dum sollicita of August 1552, he founded the Collegium Germanicum, and granted an annual income.

During his pontificate, Catholicism was restored in England under Queen Mary in 1553. Julius sent Cardinal Reginald Pole as legate with powers that he could use at his discretion to help the restoration succeed. In February 1555, an envoy was dispatched from the English Parliament to Julius to inform him of the country's formal submission, but the pope died before the envoy reached Rome.

Shortly before his death, Julius dispatched Cardinal Giovanni Morone to represent the interests of the Holy See at the Peace of Augsburg. His inactivity during the last three years of his pontificate may have been caused by the frequent and severe attacks of gout.

=== Artistic endeavors ===
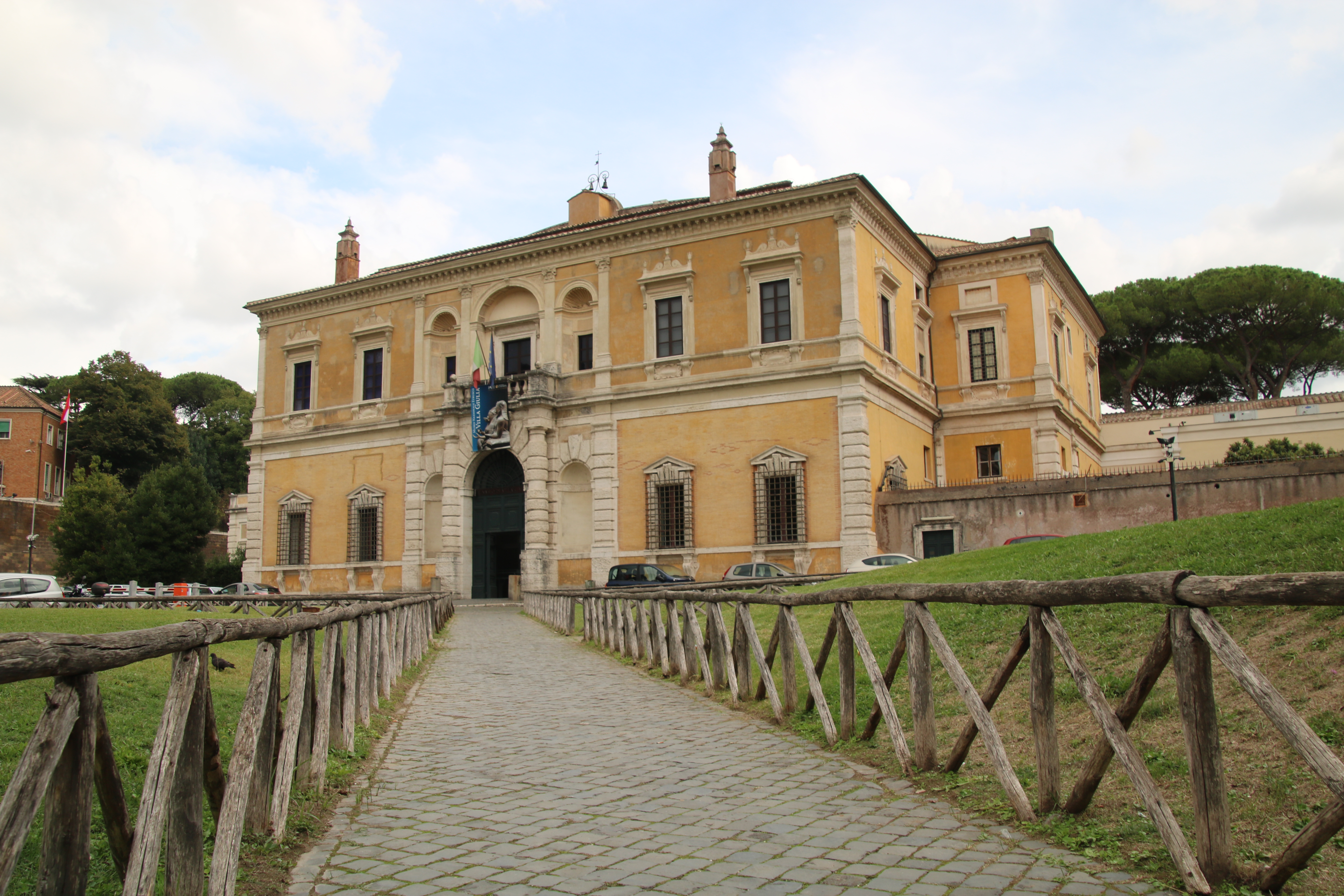
Villa Giulia (Roma)

The pope's lack of interest in political or ecclesiastical affairs caused dismay among his contemporaries. When his efforts at church reform proved ineffective, Julius III focused his attentions instead on artistic and architectural commissions as well as his lavish Villa Giulia. He spent the bulk of his time, and a great deal of papal money, on entertainments at the Villa Giulia, created for him by Vignola. Bartolomeo Ammannati designed a number of garden features under the general direction of Giorgio Vasari, with guidance from the knowledgeable pope and Michelangelo, who worked there. Today the Villa Giulia houses the National Etruscan Museum, a collection of Etruscan art and artifacts.

More significant and lasting was his patronage of the great Renaissance composer Giovanni Pierluigi da Palestrina, whom he brought to Rome as his maestro di cappella.

=== The Innocenzo scandal ===
Julius' papacy was marked by scandals, the most notable of which is centered around the pope's adoptive nephew, Innocenzo Ciocchi Del Monte. Innocenzo del Monte was a teenaged beggar found in the streets of Parma who was hired by the family as a lowly hall boy in their primary residence, the boy's age being variously given as 14, 15, or 17 years. After the elevation of Julius to the papacy, Innocenzo Del Monte was adopted into the family by the pope's brother and was then promptly created cardinal-nephew by Julius. The pope showered his favourite with benefices, including the commendatario of the abbeys of Mont Saint-Michel in Normandy and Saint Zeno in Verona, and, later, of the abbeys of Saint Saba, Miramondo, Grottaferrata and Frascati, among others. As rumours began to circle about the particular relationship between the pope and his adoptive nephew, Julius refused to take advice. The cardinals Reginald Pole and Giovanni Carafa (who would be elected pope in 1555) warned Julius of the "evil suppositions to which the elevation of a fatherless young man would give rise".

The courtier and poet Girolamo Muzio, in a 1550 letter to Ferrante Gonzaga (governor of Milan), wrote: "They write many bad things about this new pope; that he is vicious, proud, and odd in the head."

The poet Joachim du Bellay, who lived in Rome through this period in the retinue of his relative, Cardinal Jean du Bellay, expressed his scandalised opinion of Julius in two sonnets in his series Les regrets (1558), which alluded to the beautiful young Innocenzo's appointment by referencing "a Ganymede with the red hat on his head".

The Pope's political enemies likewise made hay with the scandal. In Italy, it was said that Julius showed the impatience of a "lover awaiting a mistress" while awaiting Innocenzo's arrival in Rome — and that he boasted of the boy's prowess in bed. The Venetian ambassador reported that Innocenzo Del Monte shared the pope's bed "as if he [Innocenzo] were his [Julius'] own son or grandson." "The charitably-disposed told themselves the boy might after all be simply his bastard son."

For some time afterwards, Protestants, too, seized upon the rumours in the cause of polemic. As late as 1597, in his work The Theatre of God's judgement, the English Puritan clergyman Thomas Beard, asserted that it was Julius' "custome ... to promote none to ecclesiastical livings, save only his buggerers".

Despite the damage which the scandal was inflicting on the church, it was not until after Julius' death in 1555 that anything could be done to reduce Innocenzo's visibility. He underwent temporary banishment following the murder of two men who had insulted him, and then again following the rape of two women. He tried to use his connections in the College of Cardinals to plead his cause, but his influence waned, and he died in obscurity. He was buried in Rome in the del Monte family chapel. One outcome of the cardinal-nephew scandal, however, was the upgrading of the position of Papal Secretary of State, as the incumbent had to take over the duties Innocenzo Del Monte was unfit to perform: the Secretary of State eventually replaced the cardinal-nephew as the most important official of the Holy See.

=== Other activities ===
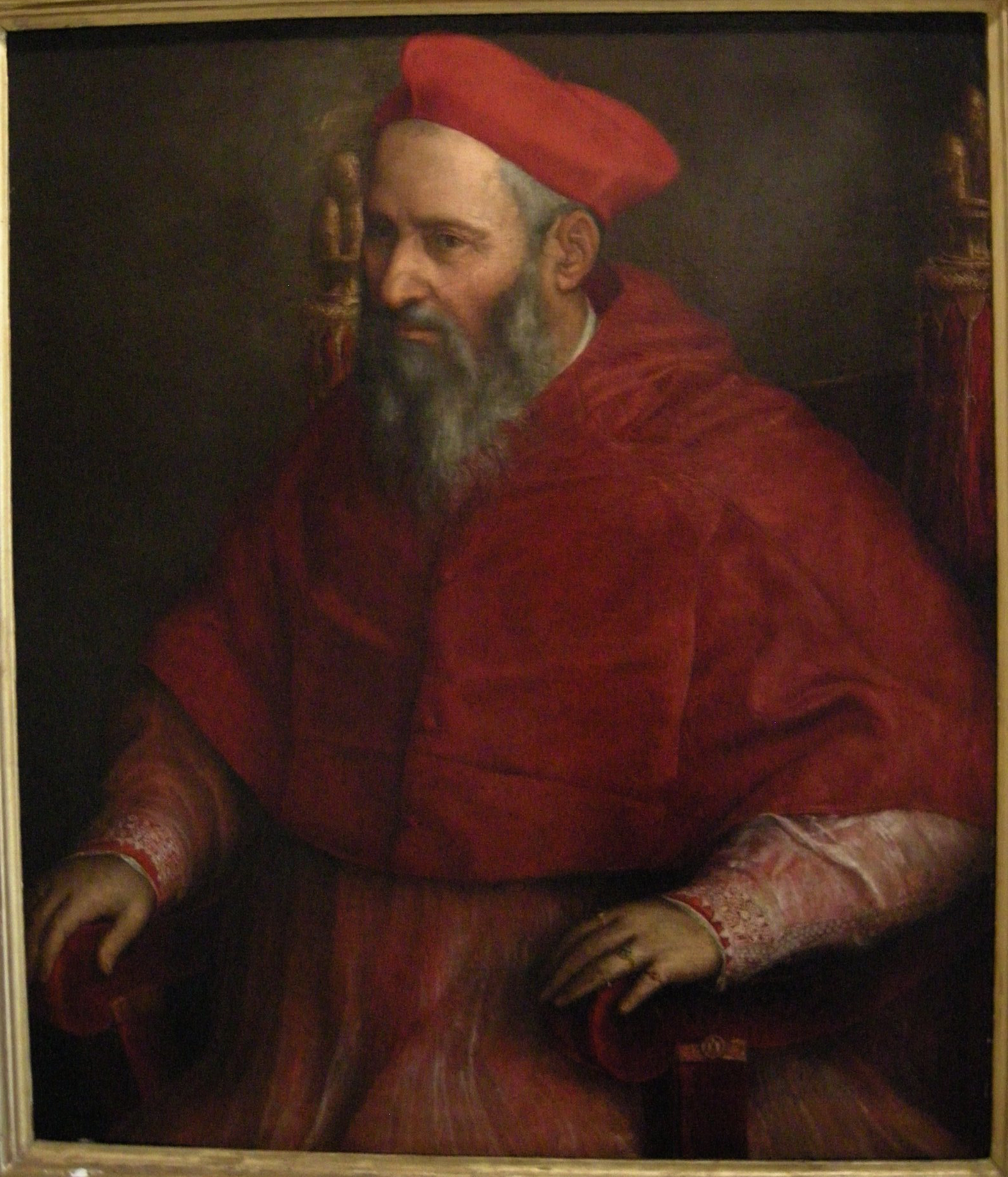
Cardinal Ciocchi del Monte depicted in a portrait before his election.

==== Consistories ====
Throughout his pontificate, Julius III named twenty new cardinals in four consistories, including one cardinal whom he nominated "in pectore" in 1551 and revealed in the following year.

==== Beatifications ====
While he did not canonize any saints during his papacy, Julius III did beatify the Basilian monk and hermit Silvester of Troina.

== Death ==
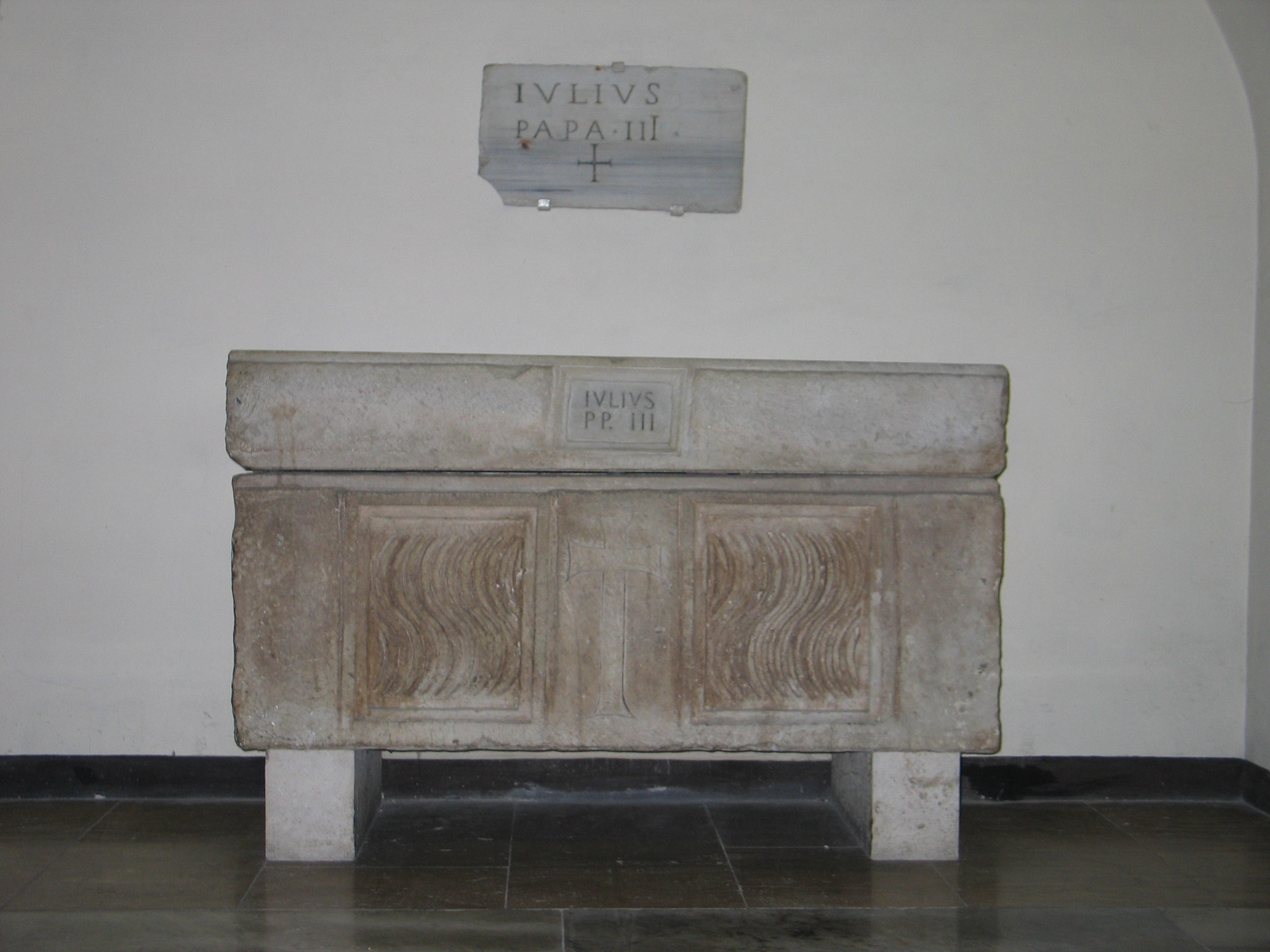
Tomb of Julius III in the Vatican grotto.

Julius III died at 7:00pm on 23 March 1555. Having suffered from gout in his later years (which he tried to cure simply by fasting), he died as a result of stomach ailments. As he was dying, he had difficulties in swallowing to the point that he ate little, having found it uncomfortable. It was believed after his death that the pope had died from stomach or esophageal cancer.

== In fiction ==
In the novel Q by Luther Blissett, Julius appears toward the end of the book as a moderate cardinal favouring religious tolerance, in the upheavals caused by the Reformation and the Roman Church's response during the 16th century. His election as pope and the subsequent unleashing of the Inquisition form the last chapters of the novel.

== See also ==
- Cardinals created by Julius III
- P. Messina, 'Del Monte, Innocenzo', Dizionario biografico degli italiani, Vol 38, Rome, 1990.

== Bibliography ==
- Burkle-Young, Francis A., and Michael Leopoldo Doerrer. The Life of Cardinal Innocenzo del Monte: A Scandal in Scarlet. Lewiston, N.Y.: Edwin Mellen, 1997.
- Dall'Orto, Giovanni, "Julius III." Who's Who in Gay and Lesbian History from Antiquity to World War II. Robert Aldrich and Garry Wotherspoon, eds. London: Routledge, 2001. 234–35.
- Edwards, John (2016). Archbishop Pole. Routledge. ISBN 9781409420576.
- Kelly, J. N. D. The Oxford Dictionary of Popes. Oxford: Oxford University Press, 1986.
- Smith, Marc (2002). "Julius III". In Levillain, Philippe (ed.). The Papacy: Gaius-Proxies. Routledge. ISBN 9780415922302.
- O'Malley, John W (2009). A History of the Popes: From Peter to the Present. Government Institutes. ISBN 9781580512299.

Catholic Church titles
Preceded by Paul III	Pope; 7 February 1550 – 23 March 1555	Succeeded by Marcellus II
