= Scalera =

Scalera is an Italian surname. Notable people with the surname include:

- Frederick Scalera, American politician
- Giuseppe Scalera (politician) (born 1954), Italian surgeon and politician
- Giuseppe Scalera, Italian footballer
- Maria Antonia Scalera Stellini, Italian poet
- Ralph Francis Scalera , American judge
- Vanessa Scalera, Italian actress

== See also ==
- Scalera Film, Italian film company
