= Tiberio Crispo =

Italian Cardinal

- Cardinal-Bishop of Sabina
- Church: Catholic Church
- Diocese: Suburbicarian Diocese of Sabina
- In office: 7 November 1565 – 6 October 1566
- Predecessor: Ranuccio Farnese
- Successor: Giovanni Michele Saraceni
- Other post: Administrator of Nepi and Sutri (1565-1566)
- Previous posts: Administrator of Sessa Aurunca (1565-1566); Administrator of Amalfi (1564-1565); Caridnal-Priest of Santa Maria in Trastevere (1562-1565); Cardinal-Priest of Sant'Agata de' Goti (1551-1562); Administrator of Amalfi (1547-1561); Cardinal-Deacon of Sant'Agata de' Goti (1545-1551); Bishop of Sessa Aurunca (1543-1546)

Orders
- Created cardinal: 19 December 1544 by Pope Paul III

Personal details
- Born: 31 January 1498 Rome, Papal States
- Died: 10 October 1566 (aged 68) Sutri, Papal States

Tiberio Crispo (31 January 1498 – 10 October 1566) was the son of Giovanni Battista Crispo and Silvia Ruffini, who, after her husband's death, was the mistress of Alessandro Farnese. It was believed that Tiberio was an illegitimate son of Farnese, who became Pope Paul III. He was certainly a natural brother of Costanza Farnese (born c. 1500) and Ranuccio Farnese (died 1529), the two undisputed legitimate children of Paul III, who were born before his election as pope in 1534.

== Biography ==
Tiberio Crispo began his career as a Canon and Prebendary of the Vatican Basilica. On 11 April 1543, Pope Paul III granted him the right of making his own will. He was also cubicularius secretus.

From June 1542 to April 1545, Crispo was the castellan of Castel Sant'Angelo.

He was appointed Bishop of Sessa Aurunca in Campania, in the province of Caserta in the Kingdom of Naples, on 6 July 1543, though he resigned the post in the next year in favour of Bartolommeo Albano, who was appointed on 7 June 1544.

Tiberio Crispo was raised to the cardinalate on 19 December 1544 by Paul III. He was assigned the deaconry of S. Agata de' Goti from 1545 to 1551. On 20 November 1551, he was promoted to the Order of Cardinal Priests, but he was allowed to continue to hold the deaconry of S. Agata as though it were a titulus, pro illa vice (on that one occasion) until 1562. On 18 May 1562, he was promoted Cardinal Priest of S. Maria in Trastevere.

He was appointed Administrator of the Diocese of Sessa Aurunca (1565 – 27 June 1566) during the vacancy caused by the death of Bishop Galeazzo Florimonte.

As papal legate to Perugia, Crispo was a "driving force behind the architectural renewal of the city". For example, in 1547, Crispo commissioned Galeazzo Alessi for the construction of Santa Maria del Popolo to replace a church demolished by the construction of the Via Nuova. He also commissioned a palace in Bolsena that bears his name, Palazzo di Tiberio Crispo (also known as the Palazzo Crispo Marsciano or Palazzo Rondanini alla Rotonda), which was designed by Antonio da Sangallo the Younger circa 1543; after the death of Sangallo in 1546, Raffaello da Montelupo was called in to finish the palace, which remained incomplete, however, after the deaths of both Crispo and Raffaello in 1566.

Historical research indicates that Crispo also likely owned the "Palazzo Nobile" in Rome, a palace originally commissioned for Thomas Cardinal Wolsey circa 1507 before passing to the Aldobrandini family; Crispo likely commissioned the 400 square metres of frescos in the palace which celebrate the life of Paul III.

After the death of Paul III, Crispo participated in the conclaves of 1549-1550 (administrator of Amalfi at the time), April 1555 (administrator of Sessa Arunca and Amalfi at the time), May 1555, 1559, 1565-1566 (bishop of Sabina at the time).

Research related to the life and patronage of Crispo is ongoing in historical archives in Rome (States Archives, Vatican Secret Archives, Vatican Library) and Umbria (States Archives of Foligno, Historical Diocesan Archives of Perugia, States Archives of Perugia).
