= Francesco Paolo Masullo =

Italian singer

Francesco Paolo Masullo (1679 in Acquaviva delle Fonti, Kingdom of Naples – 1733 in Acquaviva delle Fonti), was a singer from the Kingdom of Naples.

He is the son of Antonio Domenico. He studied singing as castrato in 1690 at the Conservatorio della Pietà dei Turchini of Naples. He became maestro di cappella of the Cathedral of Acquaviva delle Fonti in Apulia.

== Bibliography ==
- Alfredo Giovine, Musicisti e cantanti in Terra di Bari. Biblioteca dell’Archivio delle tradizioni popolari baresi, Bari, 1968, p. 49, OCLC 753723.
