= Diocese of Sessa Aurunca =

Roman Catholic diocese in Italy

Coordinates: 41.2333°N 13.9333°E

Diocese of Sessa Aurunca Dioecesis Suessana

Catholic
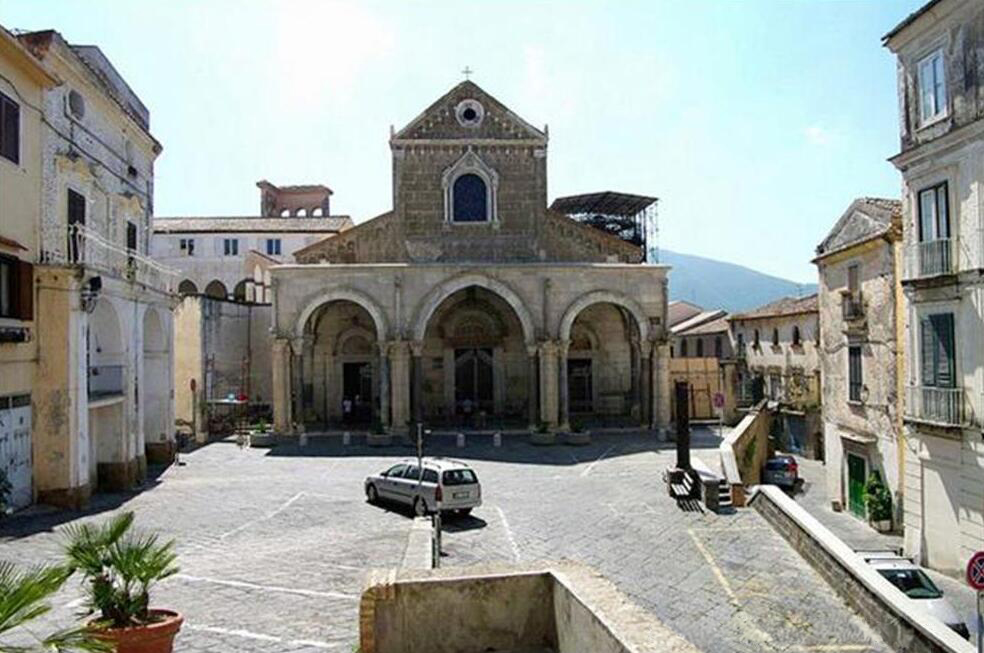
- Sessa Aurunca Cathedral

Location
- Country: Italy
- Ecclesiastical province: Naples

Statistics
- Area: 338 km^{2} (131 sq mi)
- Population: Total; Catholics: (as of 2023); 91,500; 88,500 (96.7%)
- Parishes: 42

Information
- Denomination: Catholic Church
- Sui iuris church: Latin Church
- Rite: Roman Rite
- Established: 5th Century
- Cathedral: Basilica-Cattedrale di Ss. Pietro e Paolo
- Secular priests: 33 (diocesan); 9 (Religious Orders); 8 Permanent Deacons

Current leadership
- Pope: Leo XIV
- Bishop: Giacomo Cirulli
- Metropolitan Archbishop: Domenico Battaglia

Map
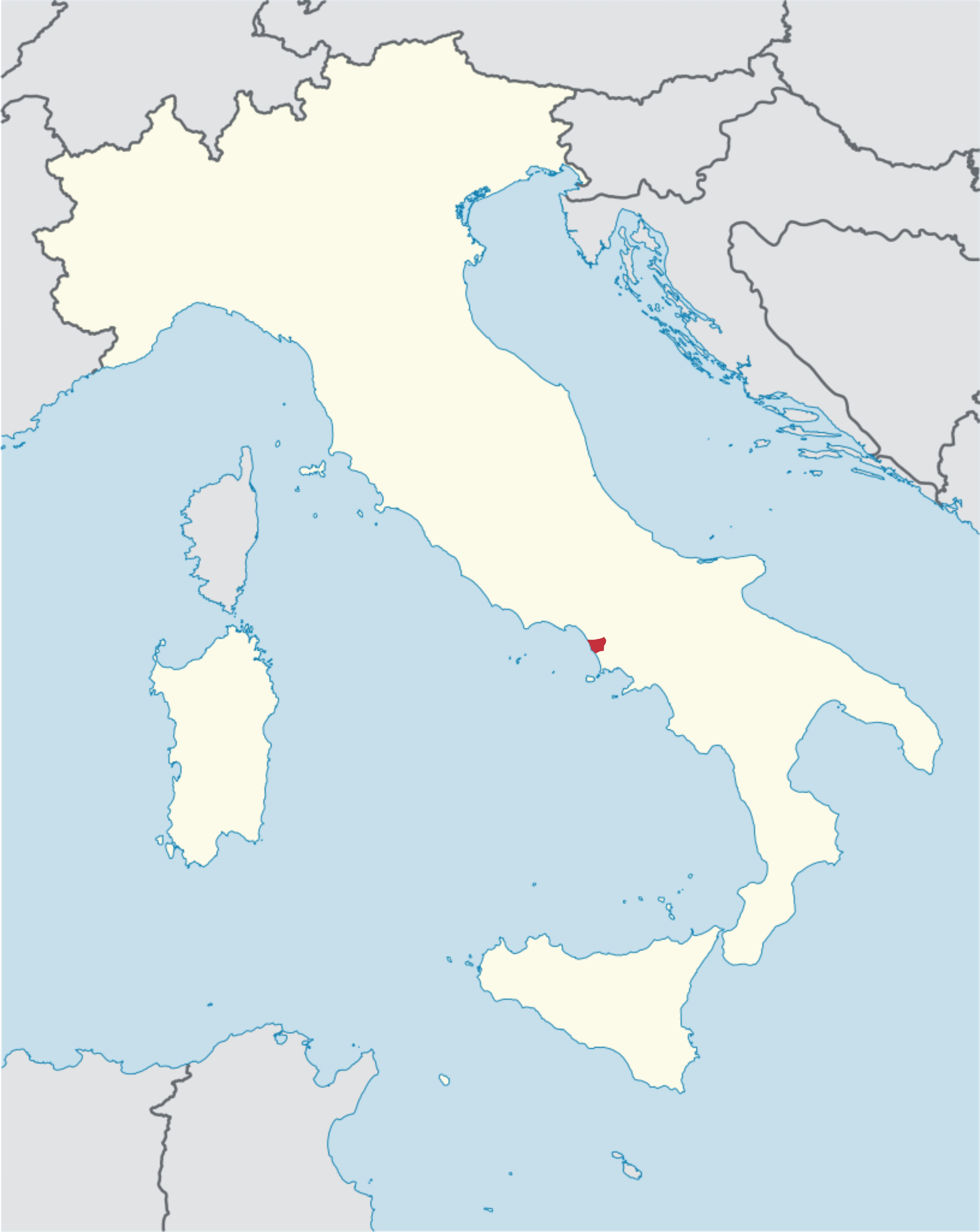

Website
- www.diocesisessa.it

The Diocese of Sessa Aurunca (Latin: Dioecesis Suessana) is a Latin diocese of the Catholic Church in southern Italy. Since 1979 it has been a suffragan of the Archdiocese of Naples.

== History ==
The inhabitants of Sessa Aurunca venerate as patron saint their Bishop, St. Castus, a martyr at the end of the third century. Scholars, however, reject the notion that he was a bishop of Sessa. There still remain ruins of the ancient basilica dedicated to him, with which catacombs are still connected. The first bishop of certain date was Fortunatus (499); but until the end of the tenth century the names of the bishops are unknown.

It is likely that Sessa Aurunca became the suffragan (subordinate) of Capua, when that diocese was raised to metropolitan status in 966 by Pope John XIII. It was certainly the case in March 1032, however, when Archbishop Atenulf of Capua consecrated Bishop Benedict of Sessa Aurunca, and confirmed him in the possession of the diocese, just as his predecessors had done. In the twelfth century, under the Normans, Suessa was part of the ecclesiastical province of Capua. The new cathedral was consecrated in 1113.

=== Cathedral ===
The ancient cathedral of Sessa, dedicated to the Virgin Mary, was outside the city, next to the walls. In 1113 the seat of the bishop was transferred to a new cathedral in the center of the city, which was dedicated on 14 July to the Virgin Mary and Saint Peter.

The cathedral is staffed and administered by a corporation, the Chapter, which is composed of four dignities (the Archdeacon, the Dean, and two Primicerii) and sixteen Canons. In 1757, there were twenty-five Canons.

=== Concordat of 1818 ===
Following the extinction of the Napoleonic Kingdom of Italy, the Congress of Vienna authorized the restoration of the Papal States and the Kingdom of Naples. Since the French occupation had seen the abolition of many Church institutions in the Kingdom, as well as the confiscation of most Church property and resources, it was imperative that Pope Pius VII and King Ferdinand IV reach agreement on restoration and restitution. Ferdinand, however, was not prepared to accept the pre-Napoleonic situation, in which Naples was a feudal subject of the papacy. Lengthy, detailed, and acrimonious negotiations ensued.

In 1818, a new concordat with the Kingdom of the Two Sicilies committed the pope to the suppression of more than fifty small dioceses in the kingdom. The ecclesiastical province of Naples was spared from any suppressions, but the province of Capua was affected. Pope Pius VII, in the bull "De Utiliori" of 27 June 1818, chose to suppress the diocese of Carinola (which is only five miles from Sessa) completely, and assign its people and territory to the diocese of Sessa. In the same concordat, the King was confirmed in the right to nominate candidates for vacant bishoprics, subject to the approval of the pope. That situation persisted down until the final overthrow of the Bourbon monarchy in 1860.

=== New ecclesiastical province ===
Following the Second Vatican Council, and in accordance with the norms laid out in the Council's decree, Christus Dominus chapter 40, major changes were made in the ecclesiastical administrative structure of southern Italy. Wide consultations had taken place with the bishops and other prelates who would be affected. Action, however, was deferred, first by the death of Pope Paul VI on 6 August 1978, then the death of Pope John Paul I on 28 September 1978, and the election of Pope John Paul II on 16 October 1978. Pope John Paul II issued a decree, "Quamquam Ecclesia," on 30 April 1979, ordering the changes. Three ecclesiastical provinces were abolished entirely: those of Conza, Capua, and Sorrento. A new ecclesiastical province was created, to be called the Regio Campana, whose Metropolitan was the Archbishop of Naples. The dioceses formerly members of the suppressed Province of Capua (Gaeta, Calvi and Teano, Caserta, and Sessa Arunca) became suffragans of Naples.

== Bishops of Sessa (Suessa) ==
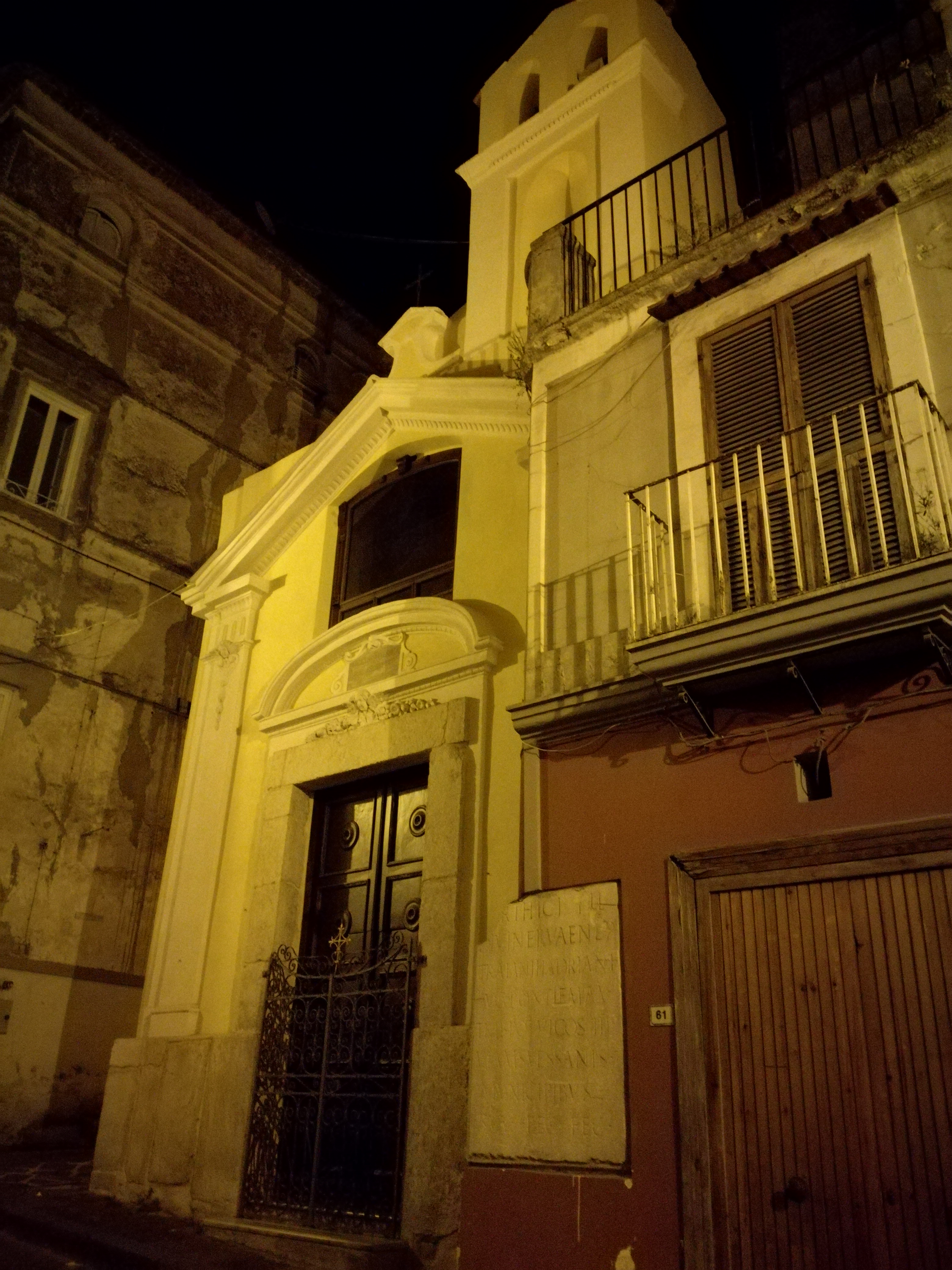
Church of the Most Holy Refuge or of Mater Dolorosa in Sessa Aurunca (XII century)

=== to 1100 ===
- Fortunatus (ca. 499–501)

[Risus]
[Jacobus]

- Joannes (ca. 998)

...

- Benedictus (attested 1032–1059)
- Milo, O.S.B. (c.1071)
- Benedictus (1092)

...

=== 1100 to 1400 ===
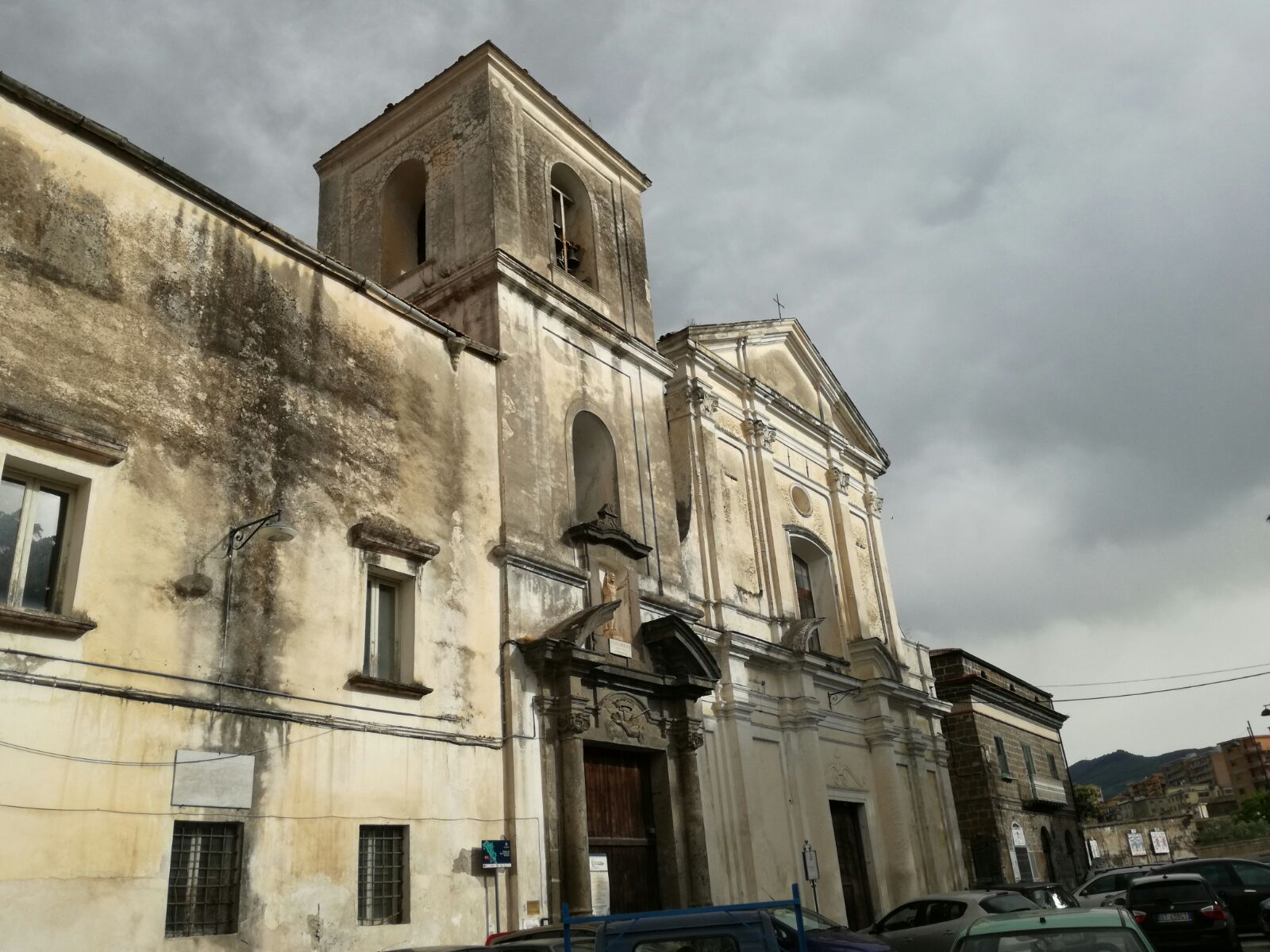
St. John's Church at Villa in Sessa Aurunca (XII/XIII century)

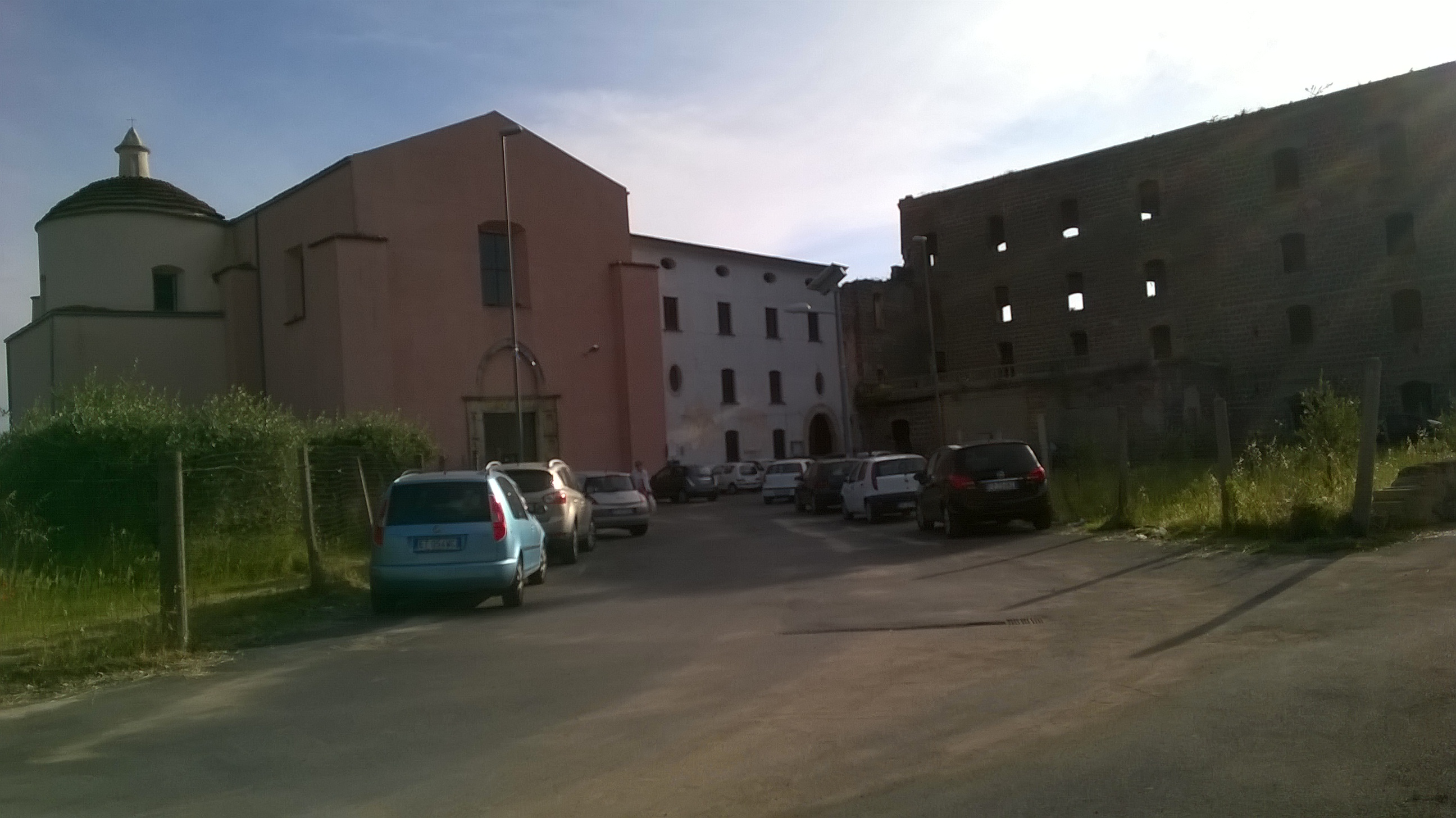
Church of St Francis and the Immaculate Conception in Sessa Aurunca (XV century)

- Jacobus, O.S.B. (first decade of 12th cent.)
- Joannes, O.S.B. (attested 1113)
- Gregorius, O.S.B. (attested 1120)
- Godofredus (attested 1126)
- Robertus

? Risus

- Hervaeus (Erveo) (attested 1171–1197)

...

- Pandulfus (1224)
- Joannes (1259–1283)
- Robertus d'Asprello (1284–1297)
- Guido (1297–1301)

[Deodatus Peccini, O.P.]

- Robertus (1301–1309)
- Bertrand (1309–1326)
- Jacques Matrizio (1326–ca. 1330)
- Joannes de Paulo (1330– )
- Hugo de S. Francisco, O. Min. (1340–ca. 1344)
- Alexander de Miro (1344–1350)
- Giacomo Petrucci, O.F.M. (24 May 1350 – 1356 Died)
- Enrico de Grandonibus de Florentia, O.P. (1356–1363)
- Matteo Bruni, O.P. (1363–ca. 1383)
- Filippo Toraldi (1383–1392)
- Antonio, O.Cist. (1392–1402)

...

=== 1400 to 1700 ===
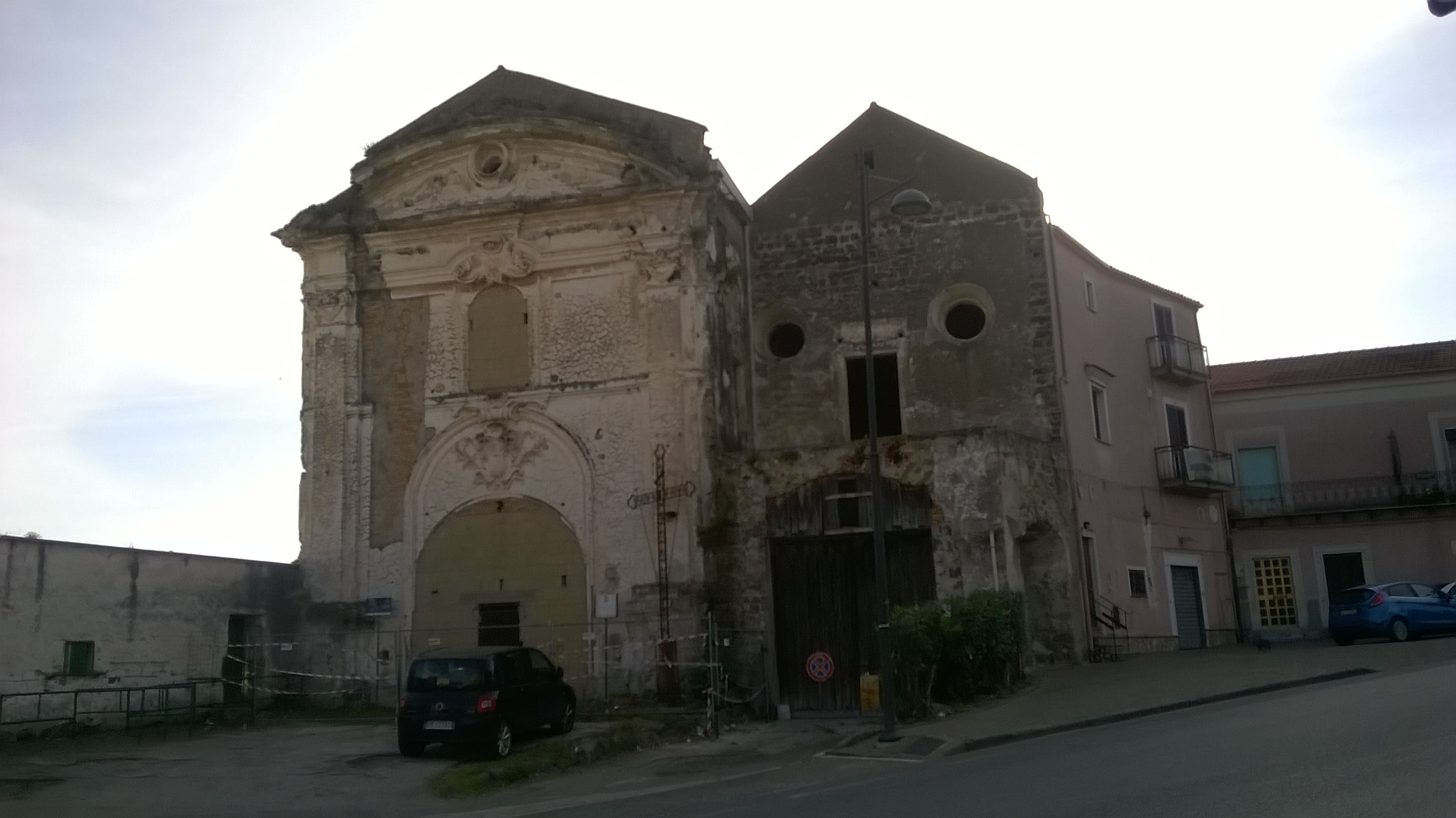
Monastery of Santa Maria Regina Coeli (1539), currently in state of ruins

- Angelo Gherardini (15 Apr 1463 – 1486)
- Pietro Ajosa (4 Aug 1486 – 1492)
- Martino Zapata (27 Nov 1499 – 1505)
- Francesco Guastaferro (22 Nov 1505 – 11 May 1543)
- Tiberio Crispo (6 Jul 1543 – 7 Jun 1546 Resigned)
- Bartolomeo Albani (7 Jun 1546 –1552)
- Galeazzo Florimonte (22 Oct 1552 – 1565 Resigned)
- Tiberio Crispo (1565 – 27 Jun 1566 Resigned)
- Giovanni Placido (27 Jun 1566 – 20 Jan 1591)
- Alessandro Riccardi (6 Mar 1591 – 16 May 1604 Died)
- Faustus Rebaglio (30 Aug 1604 – Feb 1624 Died)
- Ulysses Gherardini della Rosa (1 Jul 1624 – 9 Jan 1670 Died)
- Tommaso d'Aquino, C.R. (1670–1705)

=== 1700 to 1900 ===
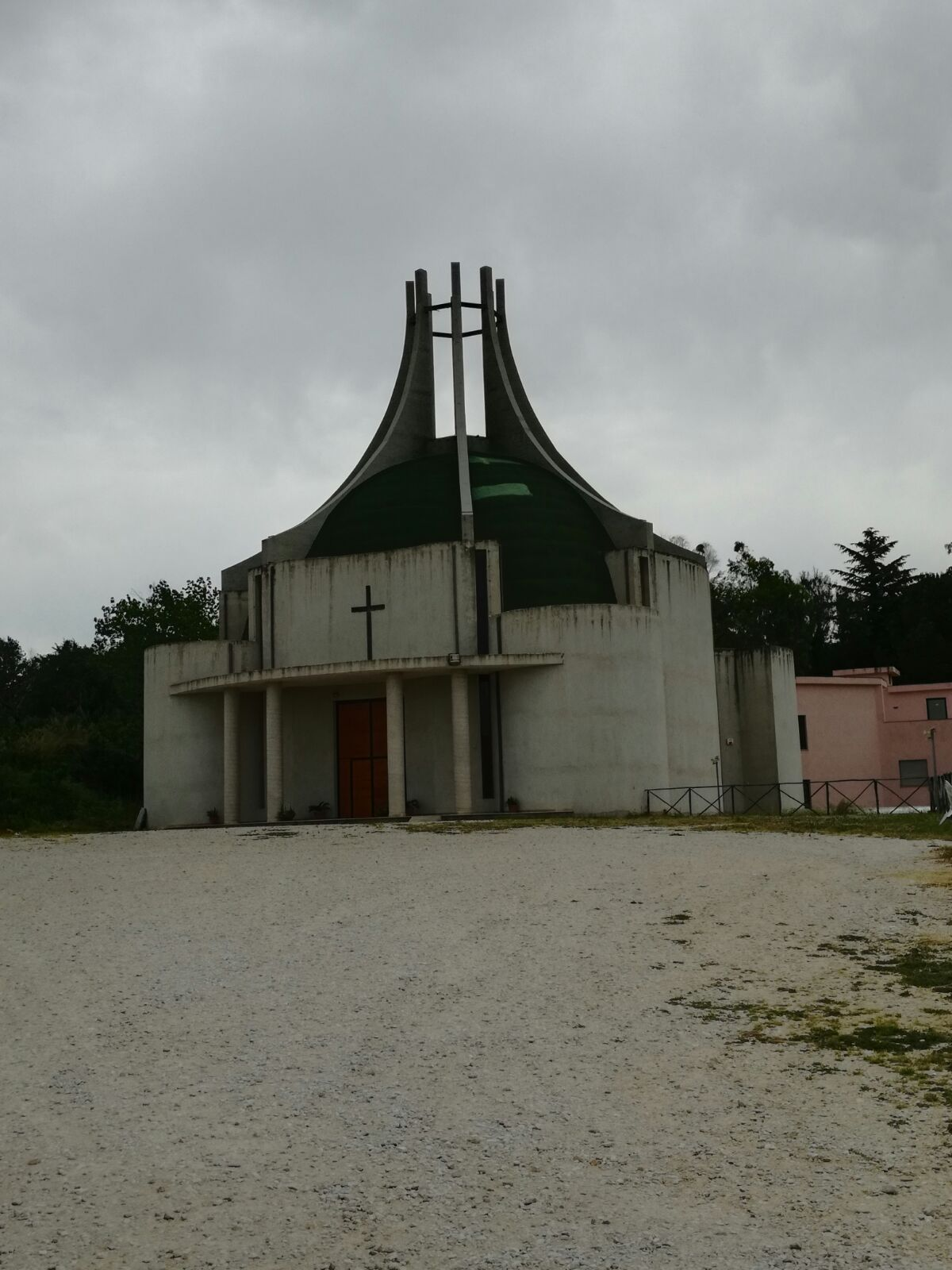
Church of the locality of Sant'Agata in Sessa Aurunca

- Raffaele Maria Filamondo, O.P. (14 Dec 1705 – 15 Aug 1706)
- Francesco Gori (4 Oct 1706 – 1708)
- Luigi Maria Macedonio, C.M. (8 Jun 1718 – 9 Dec 1727)
- Francesco Caracciolo, O.F.M. (24 Apr 1728 – 11 Aug 1757)
- Francesco Antonio Granata (26 Sep 1757 – 11 Jan 1771)
- Baldassarre Vulcano, O.S.B. (29 Jul 1771 – 20 Mar 1773)
- Antonio de Torres, O.S.B. (14 Jun 1773 – 29 Oct 1779)
- Emanuele Maria Pignone del Carretto, O.S.A. (27 Feb 1792 – 27 Sep 1796 Died)
- Pietro De Felice (18 Dec 1797 – Nov 1814 Died)
- Bartolomeo Varrone (6 Apr 1818 – 27 Feb 1832)
- Paolo Garzilli (2 Jul 1832 – 24 Jul 1845)
- Giuseppe Maria d'Alessandro (24 Nov 1845 – 15 Mar 1848)
- Ferdinando Girardi, C.M. (11 Sep 1848 – 8 Dec 1866)
- Raffaele Gagliardi (23 Feb 1872 – 18 Aug 1880)
- Carlo de Caprio (13 Dec 1880 – 14 Dec 1887)
- Giovanni Maria Diamare (1 Jun 1888 – 9 Jan 1914)

=== Since 1900 ===
- Fortunato de Santa (15 Apr 1914 – 22 Feb 1938 Died)
- Gaetano De Cicco (30 Jan 1939 – 22 Mar 1962 Retired)
- Vittorio Maria Costantini, O.F.M. Conv. (28 May 1962 – 25 Oct 1982 Retired)
- Raffaele Nogaro (25 Oct 1982 – 20 Oct 1990 Appointed, Bishop of Caserta)
- Agostino Superbo (18 May 1991 – 19 Nov 1994 Appointed, Bishop of Altamura-Gravina-Acquaviva delle Fonti)
- Antonio Napoletano, C.SS.R. (19 Nov 1994 – 25 Jun 2013 Retired)
- Orazio Francesco Piazza (25 Jun 2013 – 7 Oct 2022 Appointed, Bishop of Viterbo)
- Giacomo Cirulli (23 Feb 2023 – )

== Books ==
=== Reference works ===
- Gams, Pius Bonifatius (1873). Series episcoporum Ecclesiae catholicae: quotquot innotuerunt a beato Petro apostolo. Ratisbon: Typis et Sumptibus Georgii Josephi Manz. p. 921-922. (Use with caution; obsolete)
- Eubel, Conradus, ed. (1913). Hierarchia catholica. Vol. Tomus 1 (second ed.). Münster: Libreria Regensbergiana. p. 467-468. (in Latin)
- Eubel, Conradus, ed. (1914). Hierarchia catholica. Vol. Tomus 2 (second ed.). Münster: Libreria Regensbergiana. p. 243. (in Latin)
- Eubel, Conradus; Gulik, Guilelmus (1923). Hierarchia catholica. Vol. Tomus 3 (second ed.). Münster: Libreria Regensbergiana. p. 305. (in Latin)
- Gauchat, Patritius (Patrice) (1935). Hierarchia catholica. Vol. IV (1592-1667). Münster: Libraria Regensbergiana. p. 324. (in Latin)
- Ritzler, Remigius; Sefrin, Pirminus (1952). Hierarchia catholica medii et recentis aevi V (1667-1730). Patavii: Messagero di S. Antonio. p. 365.
- Ritzler, Remigius; Sefrin, Pirminus (1958). Hierarchia catholica medii et recentis aevi. Vol. VI (1730-1799). Patavii: Messagero di S. Antonio. p. 388.
- Ritzler, Remigius; Sefrin, Pirminus (1968). Hierarchia Catholica medii et recentioris aevi (in Latin). Vol. VII (1800–1846). Monasterii: Libreria Regensburgiana.
- Remigius Ritzler; Pirminus Sefrin (1978). Hierarchia catholica Medii et recentioris aevi (in Latin). Vol. VIII (1846–1903). Il Messaggero di S. Antonio.
- Pięta, Zenon (2002). Hierarchia catholica medii et recentioris aevi (in Latin). Vol. IX (1903–1922). Padua: Messagero di San Antonio. ISBN 978-88-250-1000-8.

=== Studies ===
- Cappelletti, Giuseppe (1866). Le chiese d'Italia della loro origine sino ai nostri giorni (in Italian). Vol. vigesimo (20). Venezia: Giuseppe Antonelli. pp. 215–229.
- D'Avino, Vincenzo (1848). Cenni storici sulle chiese arcivescovili, vescovili, e prelatizie (nullius) del Regno delle Due Sicilie (in Italian). dalle stampe di Ranucci. pp. 631-633.
- Diamare, Giorgio (1906). Memorie critico-storiche della Chiesa di Sessa Aurunca: opera divisa in due parti (in Italian). Napoli: Tip. Artigianelli. pp. 207–.
- Kamp, Norbert (2002), "The bishops of southern Italy in the Norman and Staufen Periods," in: Graham A. Loud and Alex Metcalfe (edd.), The society of Norman Italy (Leiden/Boston/Köln, 2002), pp. 185–209.
- Kehr, Paul Fridolin (1925). Italia pontificia Vol. VIII (Berlin: Weidmann 1925), pp. 268–270. (in Latin)
- Lanzoni, Francesco (1927). Le diocesi d'Italia dalle origini al principio del secolo VII (an. 604). Faenza: F. Lega, pp. 178–185. (in Italian)
- Ughelli, Ferdinando; Coleti, Niccolo (1720). Italia Sacra Sive De Episcopis Italiae (in Latin). Vol. Tomus sextus (6). Venezia: Coleti. pp. 531–547.
