= Gravina Cathedral =

Cathedral in Apulia, Italy

Coordinates: 40.8174°N 16.4135°E

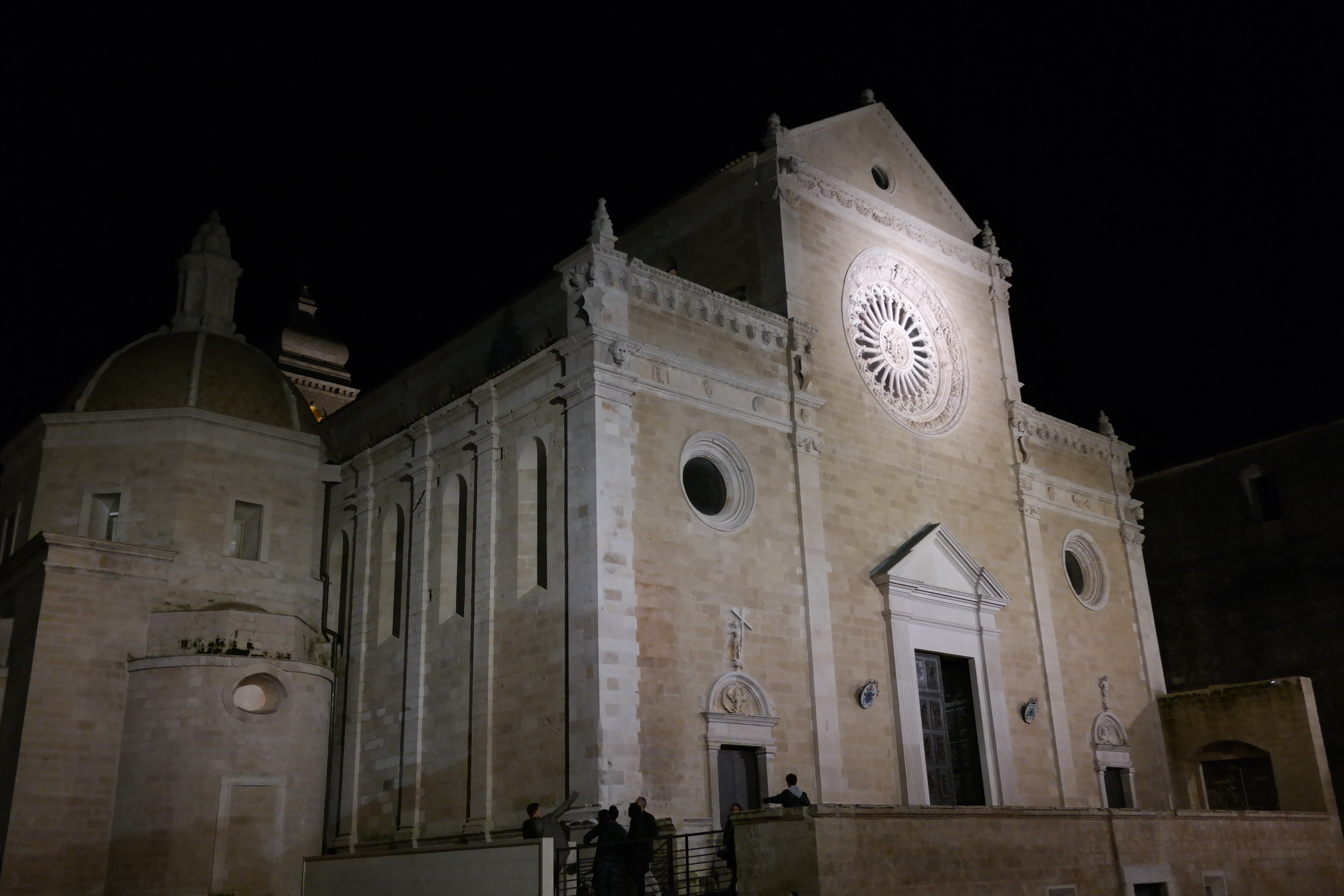
West front of the cathedral

Gravina Cathedral (Italian: Duomo di Gravina; Basilica concattedrale di Santa Maria Assunta) is a Roman Catholic cathedral located in Gravina in Puglia, region of Apulia, Italy. It was previously the episcopal seat of the Diocese of Gravina. Since 1986, along with Acquaviva Cathedral, it has served as a co-cathedral of the Diocese of Altamura-Gravina-Acquaviva delle Fonti, the seat of which is Altamura Cathedral.

In August 1993 Pope John Paul II granted Gravina Cathedral the status of a minor basilica.

== History ==
The Gravina Cathedral was first constructed in Apulia at the end of the 11th century by Humphrey of Hauteville, Count of Apulia and Calabria, who also served as town lord. The church was later destroyed in the years 1447-1456, first by a fire and followed by an earthquake, after being refurbished in a Renaissance-Romanesque style. Of the original church only a few Byzantine capitals and frescoes remain. The present cathedral was built in the thirty years following, under the supervision of the Bishop Matteo d'Aquino.

The main façade has a large rose window. The altarpieces are made from 17th-century intarsia with polychrome marble and mother of pearl. The ceiling has framed canvases. The church has an altarpiece carved in Bitonto stone (1468) by Guido da Guida. There is a San Michele (1538) carved in mazzaro, a local stone, and attributed to Stefano da Putignano. Along the north nave is a Byzantine fresco of the Madonna del Piede. The oak choir-stalls were made in the 15th century and rebuilt by Bishop Antonio Maria Manzolio (1581-1593).

The adjacent sacristy has a ceiling refurbished by bishop Manzolio, and elaborate presses. The bell-tower was built from a Norman watch tower.
