= Pietro Ajosa =

Italian Roman Catholic prelate

Most Reverend Pietro Ajosa
- Bishop of Sessa Aurunca
- Church: Catholic Church
- Diocese: Diocese of Sessa Aurunca
- In office: 1486–1492
- Predecessor: Alessandro Geraldini
- Successor: Martino Zapata
- Previous post: Bishop of Civita Castellana e Orte (1474-1486)

Personal details
- Died: 1492 Sessa Aurunca, Italy

Pietro Ajosa (died 1492) was a Roman Catholic prelate who served as Bishop of Sessa Aurunca (1486–1492) and Bishop of Civita Castellana e Orte (1474–1486).

== Biography ==
On 24 Jan 1474, he was appointed during the papacy of Pope Gregory XIII as Bishop of Civita Castellana e Orte. On 4 Aug 1486, he was appointed during the papacy of Pope Sixtus V as Bishop of Sessa Aurunca. He served as Bishop of Sessa Aurunca until his death in 1492. During his time as a bishop, he was the principal co-consecrator of Francesco de Noya, Bishop of Cefalù (1485).

== See also ==
- Catholic Church in Italy

== External links and additional sources ==
- Cheney, David M. "Diocese of Civita Castellana". Catholic-Hierarchy.org. (for Chronology of Bishops) ^{[self-published]}
- Chow, Gabriel. "Diocese of Civita Castellana (Italy)". GCatholic.org. (for Chronology of Bishops) ^{[self-published]}

Catholic Church titles
Preceded by Antonio	Bishop of Civita Castellana e Orte; 1474–1486	Succeeded by Angelo Pechinoli
Preceded by Alessandro Geraldini	Bishop of Sessa Aurunca; 1486–1492	Succeeded by Martino Zapata
