= Andrea Pastore =

Italian footballer (born 1994)

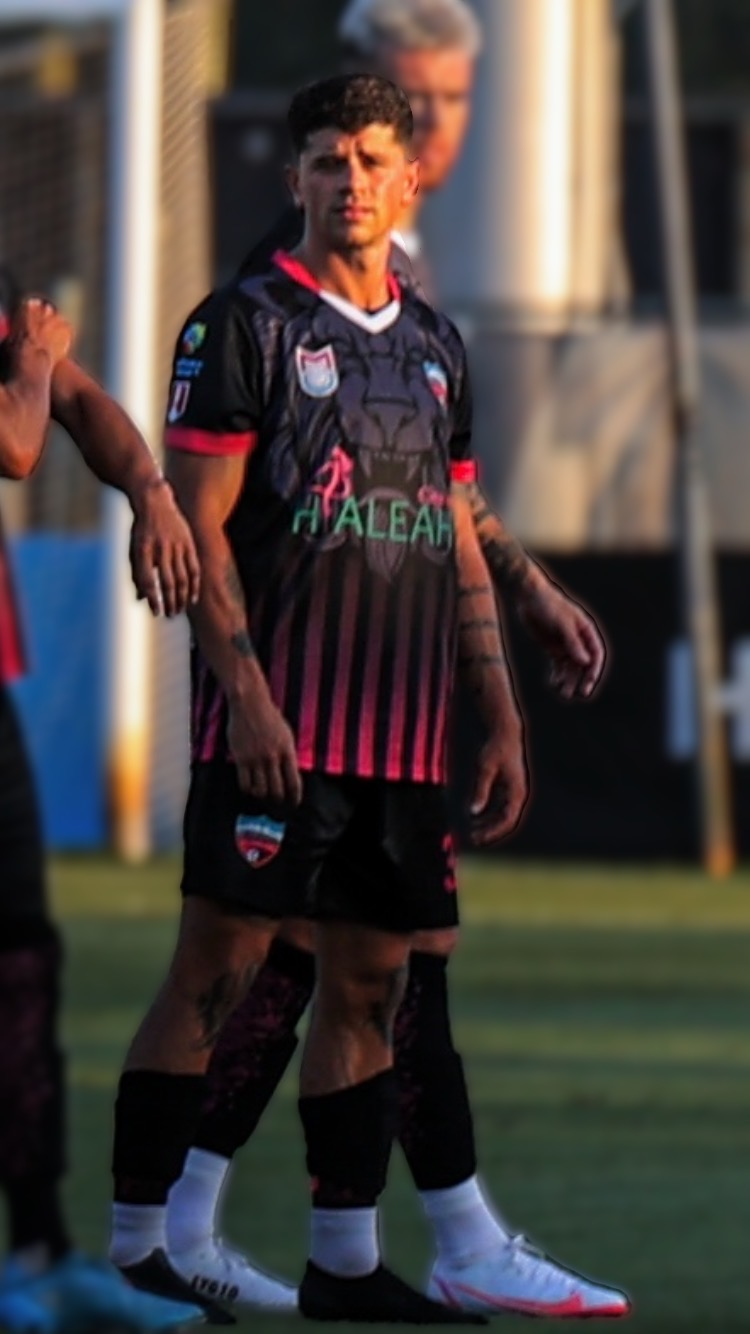

Personal information
- Date of birth: 14 June 1994 (age 32)
- Place of birth: Acquaviva delle Fonti, Italy
- Height: 1.71 m (5 ft 7 in)
- Position: Defender

Team information
- Current team: Miami United FC
- Number: 3

Youth career
- –2011: Bari
- 2011–2012: Robur Siena

Senior career*
Years	Team	Apps	(Gls)
2012–2013	Robur Siena	0	(0)
2012–2013	→ Borgo a Buggiano (loan)	29	(1)
2013–2014	Pontedera	25	(2)
2014–2016	Trapani	1	(0)
2015	→ Forlì (loan)	14	(0)
2016–2017	Virtus Francavilla	33	(5)
2017–2018	Alessandria	10	(0)
2018	→ Akragas (loan)	14	(1)
2018–2019	Virtus Francavilla	25	(1)
2019–2020	Lecco	17	(0)
- * Club domestic league appearances and goals as of 16 February 2020

Andrea Pastore (born 14 June 1994) is an Italian professional footballer who plays as a defender for Miami United FC in the National Premier Soccer League.

== Career ==
Pastore played for Bari until the age of 17, then moved to Serie A Tim club Robur Siena in order to play the Campionato Primavera 1. He signed his first contract and was loaned to Lega Pro Seconda Divisione team U.S. Borgo a Buggiano 1920, where he made 29 appearances and scored 1 goal.

He made his Serie C debut for Pontedera on 1 September 2013 in a game against Grosseto, collecting 25 appearances and scoring 2 goals. After two consecutive seasons of high-quality performances, he was bought by Serie B team Trapani Calcio, signing a 2-year contract. He will make his debut with Serse Cosmi as head-coach during an away match against Livorno.

On 7 August 2018, he signed a two-year contract with Serie C] club Virtus Francavilla, where he collected 33 appearances and managed to score up to 5 goals and 5 assists under the management of head-coach Antonio Calabro, helping his team reach the historical Lega Pro 2016-2017 Promotion Playoffs milestone.

In July 2017, he signed a three-year contract with U.S. Alessandria Calcio 1912, where he participated in winning the Coppa Italia Lega Pro.

He later joined Akragas Calcio for a five-month loan, collecting 14 appearances and scoring a goal.

In August 2018, he returned to Virtus Francavilla, where he played 25 games, scoring one goal.

Ending his contract later that year, he was called to train with one of the biggest teams in Morocco, Wydad AC, close to signing a multi-year deal before the CAF Champions League final against Espérance Sportive de Tunis.

On 20 September 2019, he joined Lecco under the supervision of coach Gaetano D'Agostino.

In November 2021, he moved to National Premier Soccer League team Miami United FC. During an international friendly match against Liga Mexicana de Futbol Champions C.F. Pachuca, he scored a brace for the 3–0 win.
