= Domenico Antonio Mele =

Italian physician and poet (born 1647)

Domenico Antonio Mele (Acquaviva delle Fonti, born 16 July 1647) was an Italian physician, poet and librettist.

== Biography ==
He was an Apulian medical officer, intellectual, apparatore and director of many festive sets held by the aristocracy in the courts of Apulia of the late seventeenth century. He was a member of Accademia dei Ravvivati of Acquaviva delle Fonti, of Accademia dei Pigri of Bari and of Accademia degli Spensierati of Rossano. He experimented many genres such as drama, musical theatre, sacred and profane theatre, the lyric with encomiastic and religious themes and literature of magical and scientific topic (Il Proteo is an example).

== Musical theatre at the Princes De Mari ==
In 1682 he was commissioned to compose the anti-prologue Acquaviva Laureata with music by Giovanni Cesare Netti, supernumerary organist of the Royal Palace of Naples, then staged at the theatre of Palazzo De Mari for the wedding of Giovan Battista De Mari (firstborn of Carlo and Geronima Doria, Princes of Acquaviva) and Laura Doria.The narrative development is almost nonexistent, the same net prevail, as in every other Mele's prologue or interlude, of arias than recitatives, minimized, marks the absolute priority of the musical dimension to the text.

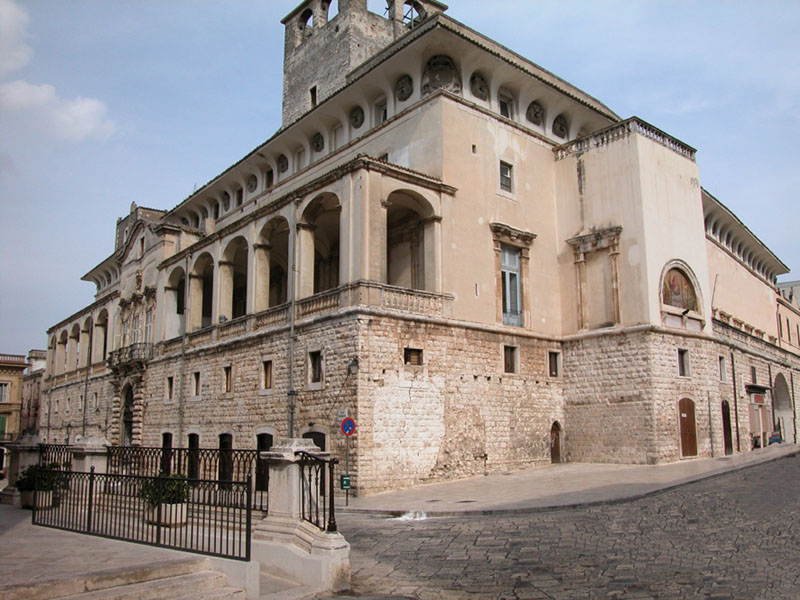
Entrance of Palazzo De Mari

== Works at the De Mari ==
=== Drammi per musica ===
- Acquaviva laureata
- La perdita di Nereo e Dori
- Le nozze di Alfeo con Aretusa
- Le metamorfosi delle stagioni
- Li svantaggi di Ippomene ed Atalanta
- Le nozze di Iocasta

=== Intermezzos ===
- Le gare degli elementi
- La Sfinge
- Raspa raspa, Bu bu, Cu cu
- Il ballo della figlia di Erodiade
- L'ubriachezza di Loth

=== Holy drama ===
- Il più bel fregio del cielo, ovvero il sacro abitino del Carmine

=== Magical poetry ===
- Il Proteo
