= Diocese of Altamura-Gravina-Acquaviva delle Fonti =

Roman Catholic diocese in Italy

Coordinates: 40.8167°N 16.5500°E

Diocese of Altamura-Gravina-Acquaviva delle Fonti Dioecesis Altamurensis-Gravinensis-Aquavievensis

Catholic
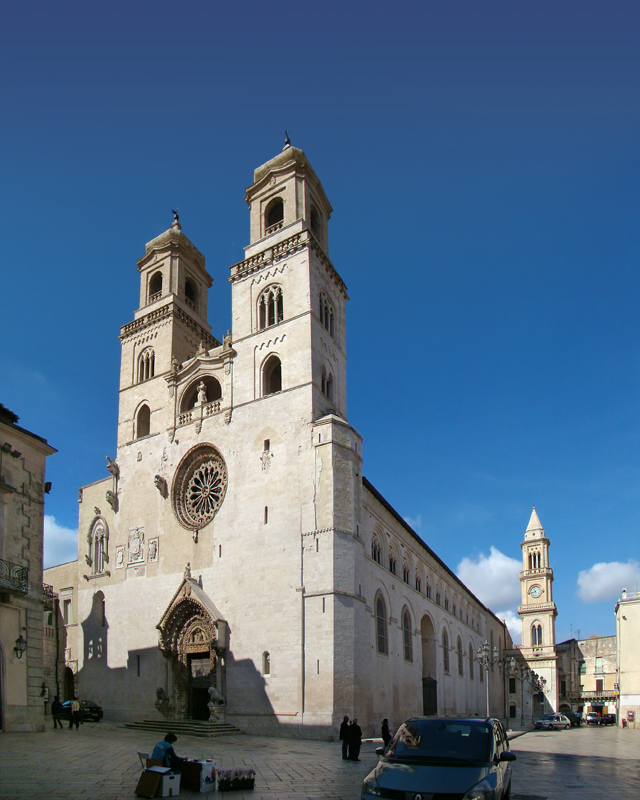
- Altamura Cathedral

Location
- Country: Italy
- Ecclesiastical province: Bari-Bitonto

Statistics
- Area: 1,309 km^{2} (505 sq mi)
- Population: Total; Catholics: (as of 2023); 166,700 (est.) ▼; 162,800 (guess) ▼
- Parishes: 40

Information
- Denomination: Catholic Church
- Rite: Roman Rite
- Established: 1248
- Cathedral: Cattedrale di S. Maria Assunta
- Co-cathedral: Basilica Concattedrale di Maria SS. Assunta; Concattedrale di S. Eustachio
- Secular priests: 65 (diocesan); 24 (Religious Orders); 11 Permanent Deacons

Current leadership
- Pope: Leo XIV
- Bishop: Giuseppe Russo
- Bishops emeritus: Mario Paciello

Map
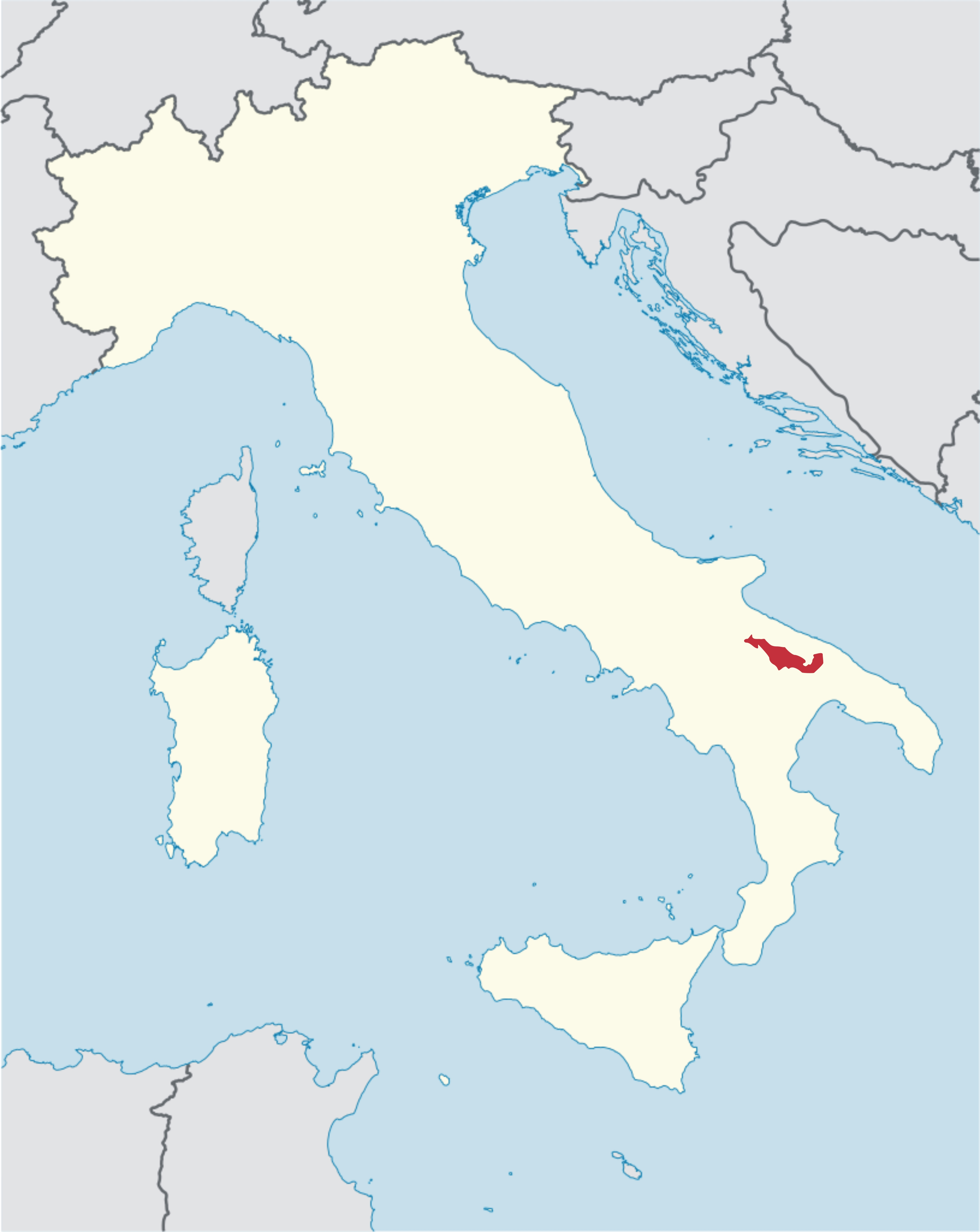

The Diocese of Altamura-Gravina-Acquaviva delle Fonti (Latin: Dioecesis Altamurensis-Gravinensis-Aquavievensis) is a Latin Church diocese of the Catholic Church in Apulia, southern Italy, 40 km (25 miles) south-west of the coastal city of Bari. In 1986 the territorial prelature of Altamura e Acquaviva delle Fonti was united with the diocese of Gravina. The present diocese is a suffragan of the archdiocese of Bari-Bitonto.

The seat of the bishop is at Altamura Cathedral, with Acquaviva Cathedral and Gravina Cathedral as co-cathedrals.

== History ==
=== Altamura ===
Altamura was once a territorial prelature, founded in 1232 and endowed by the Emperor Frederick II, who declared it to be free and exempt from all episcopal jurisdiction. It was governed by an archpriest. It was declared exempt from episcopal jurisdiction by Pope Innocent IV in 1248, and again by Pope Innocent VIII (1484–92).

The Chapter of the major church of the territorial prelature of Altamura was composed of four dignities (the Archdeacon, the Cantor, the Primicerius, and the Treasurer) and twenty-four Canons, who had the right to use the cappa magna and rochet.

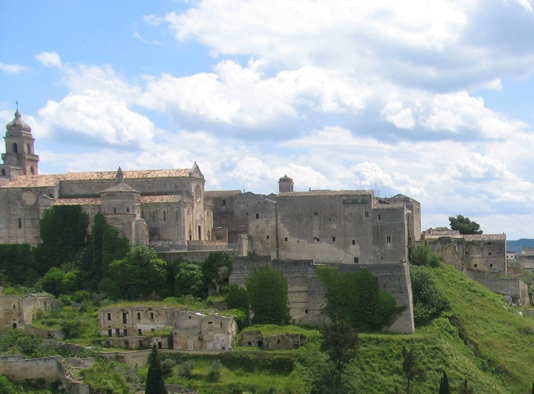
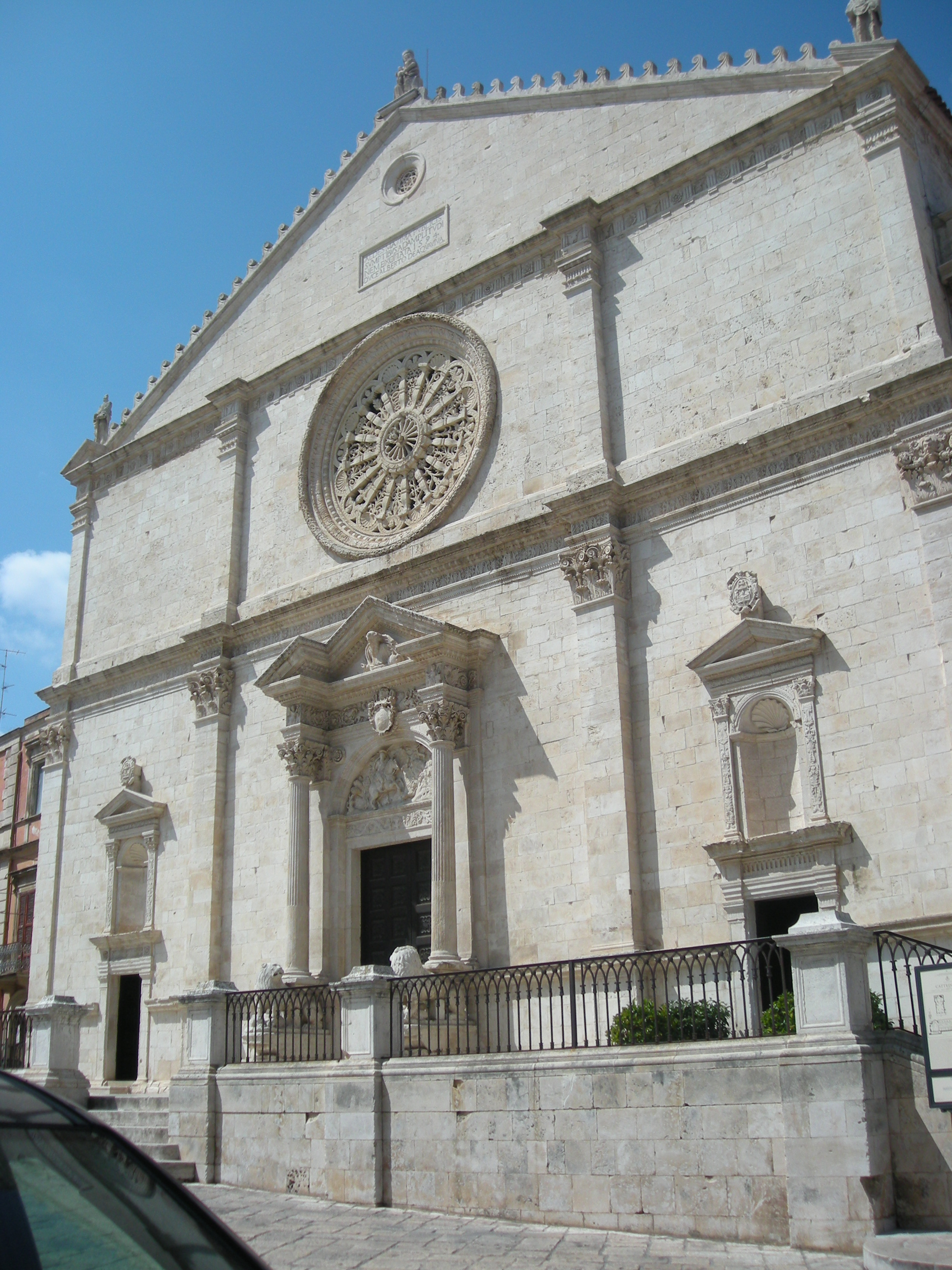
Co-cathedrals: Gravina Cathedral (left), and Acquaviva Cathedral (right)

=== Acquaviva ===
Acquaviva delle Fonti, a town of the Campagna, was declared similarly exempt by Pope Pius IX and united with Altamura on 17 August 1848.

=== Diocesan Reorganization ===
Following the Second Vatican Council, and in accordance with the norms laid out in the council's decree, Christus Dominus chapter 40, It also recommended the abolition of anomalous units such as exempt territorial prelatures. Pope Paul VI ordered a reorganization of the ecclesiastical provinces in southern Italy, beginning with consultations among the members of the Congregation of Bishops in the Vatican Curia, the Italian Bishops Conference, and the various dioceses concerned.

On 18 February 1984, the Vatican and the Italian State signed a new and revised concordat. Based on the revisions, a set of Normae was issued on 15 November 1984, which was accompanied in the next year, on 3 June 1985, by enabling legislation. According to the agreement, the practice of having one bishop govern two separate dioceses at the same time, aeque personaliter, was abolished. The Vatican continued consultations which had begun under Pope John XXIII for the merging of small dioceses, especially those with personnel and financial problems, into one combined diocese.

On 30 September 1986, Pope John Paul II ordered that the diocese of Gravina be merged with the territorial prelatures of Altamura and of Aquaviva into one diocese with one bishop, with the Latin title Dioecesis Altamurensis-Gravinensis-Aquavivensis. The seat of the diocese was to be in Altamura, where the prelatial church was to serve as the cathedral of the merged diocese. The cathedral in Gravina and the prelatial seat in Aquaviva were to have the honorary titles of "co-cathedral"; the Chapters were each to be a Capitulum Concathedralis. There was to be only one diocesan Tribunal, in Altamura, and likewise one seminary, one College of Consultors, and one Priests' Council. The territory of the new diocese was to include the territory of the suppressed diocese and territorial prelatures. To make the territories of the new diocese congruent, the town of San Teramo in Colle was detached from the archdiocese of Bari-Bitonto and added to that of Altamura. The new diocese was made a suffragan of the archdiocese of Bari-Bitonto.

== Prelates and Bishops ==
=== Territorial Prelature of Altamura ===
Erected: 1248
Latin Name: Altamurensis

- Riccardo of Brindisi
- Niccolò Barbara (1250 - 1262)
- Giovanni Correnti (1262 - 1264)
- Palmiro De Viana (1265 - 1266)
- Niccolò Catamarra (1270 - 1274)
- Giovanni (1275 - 1278 resigned)
- Guglielmo De Corbolio (21 ottobre 1279 - 1280 resigned)
- Pietro De Lusarchiis (1280 - 1284)
- Roberto De Lusarchiis (30 dicembre 1284 - 1285 resigned)
- Giovanni II (1285 dimesso)
- Giovanni III (1285 - 1292 resigned)
- Dionigi Juppart (26 aprile 1293 - 1295)
- Guglielmo De Venza (1295 resigned)
- Pietro de Moreriis (1296 – c. 1308?)
- Umberto De Montauro (1308 - 1313)
- Rostaino di Candole (1313 - 1328)
- Humfredo (1328 - 1329)
- Pietro De Moreriis (1329 - 1335 resigned)
- Giovanni De Moreriis (1336 - 1350)
- Dionigi De Merlino (1350 - 1366)
- Guglielmo Gallo (1367 - ?)
- Pietro D'Anfilia (1394 - 1399)
- Antonio Berleth (1400 - 1420)
- Antonio Della Rocca (1420 - 1442)
- Pietro Di Gargano (1442 - 1464)
- Antonio D'Ajello (1464 - 1472)

Antonio del Giudice (De Pirro) (1472 - 1477) Royal Administrator

- Pietro Miguel (1477 -1477 resigned)
- Francesco Rossi (1477 - 1527)
- Fabio Pignatelli (29 luglio 1528 - circa febbraio 1529 resigned)*
- Niccolò Sapio (2 febbraio 1529 - 1548)
- Vincenzo Salazar (1550 - 1557 resigned)
- Vincenzo Palagano (1557 - 1579)
- Maurizio Moles (1579 - 1580 resigned)
- Giulio Moles (1580 - 1586 resigned)
- Girolamo De Mari (1586 - 1624)

Sede vacante (1624-1627)

- Rodrigo D'Anaja e Guevara (1627 - 1635)

Sede vacante (1635-1640)

- Alessandro Effrem (1640 - 1644)

Sede vacante (1644-1649)

- Giovanni Montero Olivares (1649 - 1656)
- Giuseppe Cavalliere (1656 - 1664)
- Pietro Magri (1664 - 1688)
- Nicola Abrusci (1689 -1698)
- Baldassarre De Lerma (1699 - 1717)
- Michele Orsi (1718 - 1722)
- Damiano Poloù (1724 - 1727)
- Antonio De Rinaldis (1727 - 1746)
- Marcello Papiniano Cusano (1747 - 1753)
- Giuseppe Mastrilli (1753 - 1761 resigned)
- Bruno Angrisani (1761 - 1775)
- Celestino Guidotti (1775 - 1783)
- Gioacchino de Gemmis (1783 - 1818)
- Federico Guarini, O.S.B. (1818 - 1828)

Cassiodoro Margarita (1828 - 17 August 1842 resigned) Royal administrator

- Giandomenico Falcone (1 June 1842 – 10 July 1858 – 24 December 1862)

Sede Vacante (24 December 1862 – 28 August 1879)

- Luigi Marcello Pellegrini (1879–1894 Died)
- Carlo Caputo (1897–1904 Appointed Apostolic Nuncio to Germany)
- Tommaso Cirielli (1899–1902 Died)
- Carlo Giuseppe Cecchini, O.P. (1904–1909 Appointed Archbishop of Taranto)
- Adolfo Verrienti (1910–1929 Resigned)
- Domenico Dell'Aquila (1932–1942 Died)
- Giuseppe Della Cioppa (1943–1947 Appointed Bishop of Alife)

=== Territorial Prelature of Altamura ed Acquaviva delle Fonti ===
Name Changed: 17 August 1848
Latin Name: Altamurensis et Aquavievensis
Metropolitan: Archdiocese of Bari-Canosa

- Salvatore Rotolo, S.D.B. (1948–1962 Retired)
- Antonio D'Erchia (1962–1964 Appointed Apostolic Administrator of Conversano)
- Salvatore Isgró (1975–1982 Appointed Archbishop of Sassari)
- Tarcisio Pisani, O.M. (1982–1986 Appointed Bishop of Altamura-Gravina-Acquaviva delle Fonti)

=== Diocese of Altamura-Gravina-Acquaviva delle Fonti ===
30 September 1986: United with the Diocese of Gravina
Latin Name: Altamurensis-Gravinensis-Aquavievensis

- Tarcisio Pisani, O.M. (1986–1994)
- Agostino Superbo (1994–1997 Resigned)
- Mario Paciello (1997–2013 Retired)
- Giovanni Ricchiuti (2013–2023 Retired)
- Giuseppe Russo (2023– )

== See also ==
- Roman Catholic Diocese of Gravina-Montepeloso

== Books ==
- Ciccimarra, Nicola (1964). La Cattedrale di Altamura: monumento di vita, di fede, di arte (in Italian). Altamura: Cressati.
- Cordasco, Pasquale, ed. (1994). Le pergamene della cattedrale di Altamura (1309-1381) (in Italian and Latin). Bari: Società di storia patria per la Puglia.
- D'Avino, Vincenzo (1848). Cenni storici sulle chiese arcivescovili, vescovili, e prelatizie (nulluis) del Regno delle Due Sicilie (in Italian). Napoli: Ranucci. pp. 748–749.
- Giaconella, Francesco (2020), "L’inedita cronaca di Altamura di Michele Santoro," Altamura: Rivista storica no. 61 (Altamura: Archivio-Biblioteca-Museo Civico, Altamura 2020), pp. 115–138, at p. 123.
- Giannone, Pietro (1821). Istoria civile del regno di Napoli (in Italian). Vol. quinto (5). Milano: Nicolò Bettoni. pp. 454–459.
- Giustiniani, Lorenzo (1797). Dizionario geografico ragionato del Regno di Napoli (in Italian). Vol. Tom. I. Napoli: Vincenzo Manfredi. pp. 125–136.
- Lucarelli A. (1904), Notizie e documenti riguardanti la storia di Acquaviva delle Fonti, (in Italian), Vol. I, Giovinazzo, 1904.
- Serena, Ottavio (1902). "La chiesa di Altamura, la serie dei suoi prelati e le sue iscrizioni", in: Rassegna pugliese di scienze lettere ed arti 19, nos. 11-12 (1902), pp. 322–337.
