= Ennio Appignanesi =

Italian Catholic archbishop

- Archbishop of Potenza-Muro Lucano-Marsico Nuovo
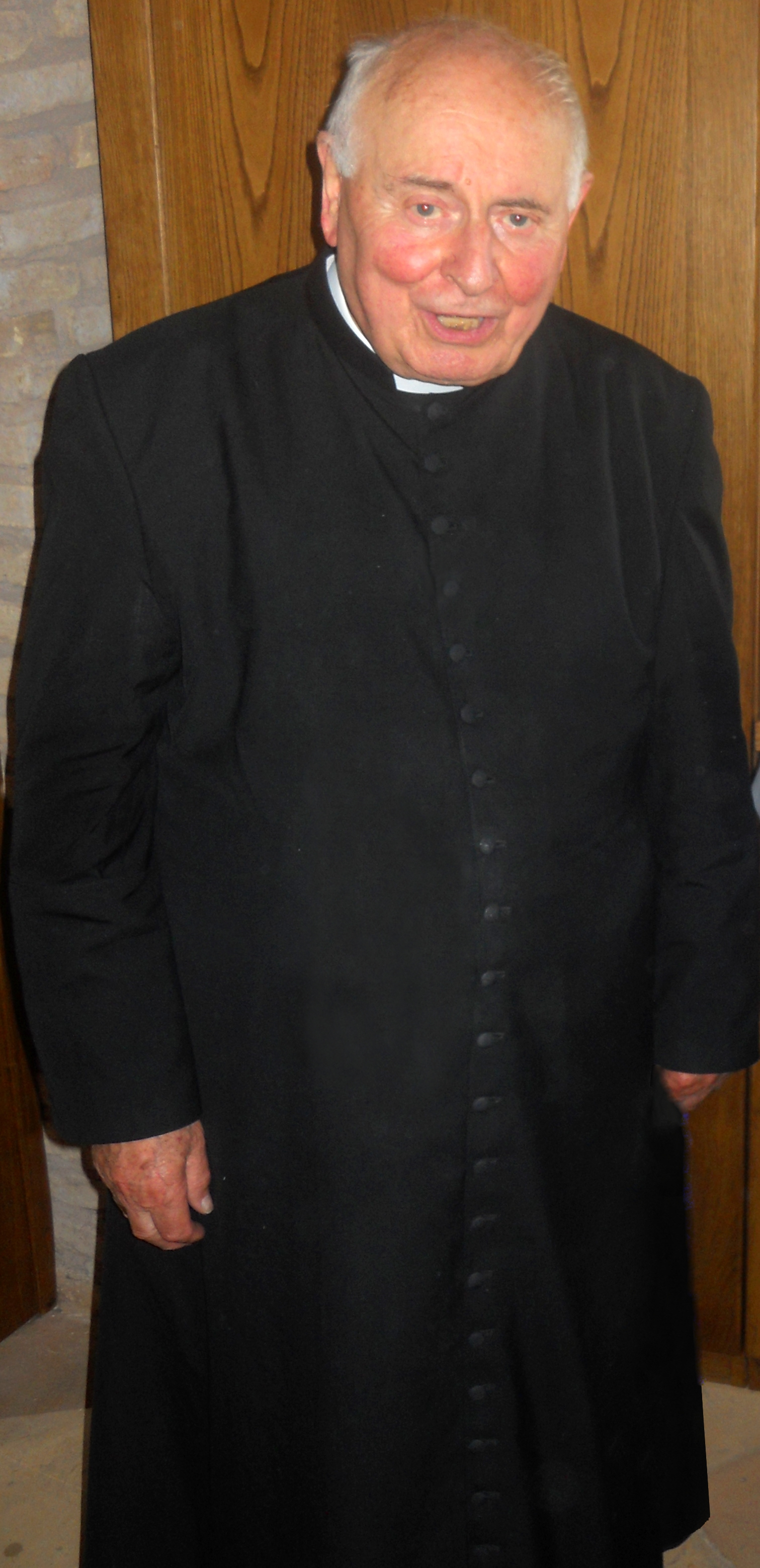
- Appignanesi in 2014
- Church: Catholic Church
- Archdiocese: Archdiocese of Potenza-Muro Lucano-Marsico Nuovo
- In office: 19 January 1993 – 9 January 2001
- Predecessor: Giuseppe Vairo
- Successor: Agostino Superbo
- Previous posts: Archbishop of Matera-Irsina (1988-1993); Titular Archbishop of Lorium (1985-1988); Vicegerent of Rome (1985-1988); Bishop of Castellaneta (1983-1985); Titular Bishop of Themisonium (1980-1983); Auxiliary Bishop of San Severo (1980-1983); Auxiliary Bishop of Lucera (1980-1983)

Orders
- Ordination: 8 April 1950
- Consecration: 6 January 1981 by Pope John Paul II

Personal details
- Born: 18 June 1925 Belforte del Chienti, Province of Macerata, Kingdom of Italy
- Died: 26 March 2015 (aged 89) Rome, Italy

Ennio Appignanesi (18 June 1925 – 26 March 2015) was an Italian Catholic archbishop.

Ordained to the priesthood in 1950, Appignanesi became auxiliary bishop of the Diocese of Lucera. He was eventually named the archbishop of Potenza-Muro-Lucano-Marsico Nuevo, Italy in 1993, and retired in 2001.
