= Antonio Napoletano =

Italian Roman Catholic bishop (1937–2019)

Antonio Napoletano CSsR
- Bishop of Sessa Aurunca
- Church: Catholic Church
- Diocese: Diocese of Sessa Aurunca
- In office: 19 November 1994 – 25 June 2013
- Predecessor: Agostino Superbo
- Successor: Orazio Francesco Piazza

Orders
- Ordination: 19 March 1961
- Consecration: 6 January 1995 by Pope John Paul II

Personal details
- Born: 8 June 1937 Nocera Inferiore, Province of Salerno, Kingdom of Italy
- Died: 25 March 2019 (aged 81) Teggiano, Campania, Italy

Antonio Napoletano (8 June 1937 – 25 March 2019) was an Italian Roman Catholic bishop.

Napoletano was born in Italy and was ordained to the priesthood in 1961. He served as bishop of the Roman Catholic Diocese of Sessa Aurunca, Italy, from 1994 to 2013.
