= Agostino Superbo =

Italian Roman Catholic bishop (1940–2026)

The Most Reverend Agostino Superbo
- Archbishop emeritus of Potenza–Muro Lucano–Marsico Nuovo
- Church: Catholic Church
- Archdiocese: Potenza–Muro Lucano–Marsico Nuovo
- Appointed: 9 January 2001
- Term ended: 5 October 2015
- Predecessor: Ennio Appignanesi
- Successor: Salvatore Ligorio
- Other post: General Ecclesiastical Assistant of Italian Catholic Action (1996–2001)
- Previous posts: Bishop of Sessa Aurunca (1991–1994); Bishop of Altamura-Gravina-Acquaviva delle Fonti (1994–1997)

Orders
- Ordination: 29 June 1963 by Francesco Brustia
- Consecration: 29 June 1991 by Michele Giordano, Andrea Mariano Magrassi and Raffaele Calabro

Personal details
- Born: 7 February 1940 Minervino Murge, Kingdom of Italy
- Died: 2 August 2026 (aged 86) Andria, Italy
- Education: Pontifical Theological Seminary of Southern Italy, University of Bari
- Motto: Sub Tuum Praesidium

Agostino Superbo (7 February 1940 – 2 August 2026) was an Italian Roman Catholic prelate who served as Archbishop of Potenza–Muro Lucano–Marsico Nuovo from 2001 until his retirement in 2015. Previously, he was the Bishop of Sessa Aurunca (1991–1994), Bishop of Altamura-Gravina-Acquaviva delle Fonti (1994–1997) and a General Ecclesiastical Assistant of Italian Catholic Action (1996–2001).

== Early life, education and priestly ministry ==
Superbo was born on 7 February 1940 in Minervino Murge, Apulia. He was ordained a priest on 29 June 1963 by Bishop Francesco Brustia after completing his ecclesiastical studies at the Pontifical Theological Seminary of Southern Italy and the University of Bari.

After his ordination, Superbo served from 1964 as a teacher of literature at the diocesan seminary in Andria. He was subsequently parochial vicar at the parish of the Santissima Annunziata, vice assistant to the diocesan youth section of Italian Catholic Action, and secretary to the Bishop of Andria.

From 1971 to 1985 he served in the Diocese of Andria as rector of the diocesan seminary, teacher of religion in state schools, and professor of philosophy and theology at the Institute of Religious Sciences. He was also appointed regional assistant for Apulia to the Catholic Action Student Movement. In 1977 he was named a Chaplain of His Holiness. From 1985 to 1991 he was rector of the Regional Seminary of Molfetta and professor of philosophy there.

== Episcopal ministry ==
On 18 May 1991, Pope John Paul II appointed Superbo as Bishop of Sessa Aurunca. He received episcopal consecration on 29 June 1991 from Cardinal Michele Giordano.

On 19 November 1994 he was transferred to the Diocese of Altamura-Gravina-Acquaviva delle Fonti. Within the Italian Episcopal Conference he served as a member of the Episcopal Commission for Catholic Education, Culture, Schools and Universities and of the ecclesial commission Iustitia et Pax. On 18 May 1996 he was appointed General Ecclesiastical Assistant of Italian Catholic Action. He also served as president of the Episcopal Commission for the Laity and as ecclesiastical assistant to the Forum of Catholic Action.

On 6 August 1997, Pope John Paul II accepted his resignation as Bishop of Altamura–Gravina–Acquaviva delle Fonti, and Superbo was concentrated at his service as the General Ecclesiastical Assistant of Italian Catholic Action.

== Archbishop of Potenza ==
On 9 January 2001, Pope John Paul II appointed Superbo Archbishop of Potenza–Muro Lucano–Marsico Nuovo, succeeding Ennio Appignanesi.

During his episcopate he also held several positions within the Italian Episcopal Conference, including responsibilities related to clergy and ecclesiastical life. He retired on 5 October 2015 upon reaching the canonical age limit and was succeeded by Salvatore Ligorio.

== Later life and death ==
In June 2023, Superbo celebrated the 60th anniversary of his priestly ordination in his hometown of Minervino Murge. The celebration included a Solemn Mass attended by Cardinal Marcello Semeraro.

Superbo died in Andria on 2 August 2026 at the age of 86.

Catholic Church titles
Preceded by Ennio Appignanesi	Archbishop of Potenza-Muro Lucano-Marsico Nuovo; 2001–2015	Succeeded by Salvatore Ligorio
Preceded by Tarcisio Pisani	Bishop of Altamura-Gravina-Acquaviva delle Fonti; 1994–1997	Succeeded by Mario Paciello
Preceded by Raffaele Nogaro	Bishop of Sessa Aurunca; 1991–1994	Succeeded by Antonio Napoletano
