= Carlo De Vincentiis =

Italian violinist

Carolo Antonio Di Vincenzo also known as Carlo De Vincentiis or Acquaviva (1 May 1622 – 1677) was an Italian violinist.

He was born in Acquaviva delle Fonti to Donato and Livia Cassotta. He was one of the most important Neapolitan violinists of the 17th century, teacher of Pietro Marchitelli since 1657. The musicologist Giovanni Tribuzio (1985) descends from his brother Cola Francesco Di Vincenzo, born in 1626.
