= Maria Antonia Scalera Stellini =

Italian poet and playwright

- Born: 5 February 1634; Acquaviva delle Fonti, Italy
- Died: 21 September 1704 (aged 70); Ariccia, Italy
- Occupations: Poet and playwright
- Writing career
- Period: 17th century
- Notable work: Li divertimenti poetici

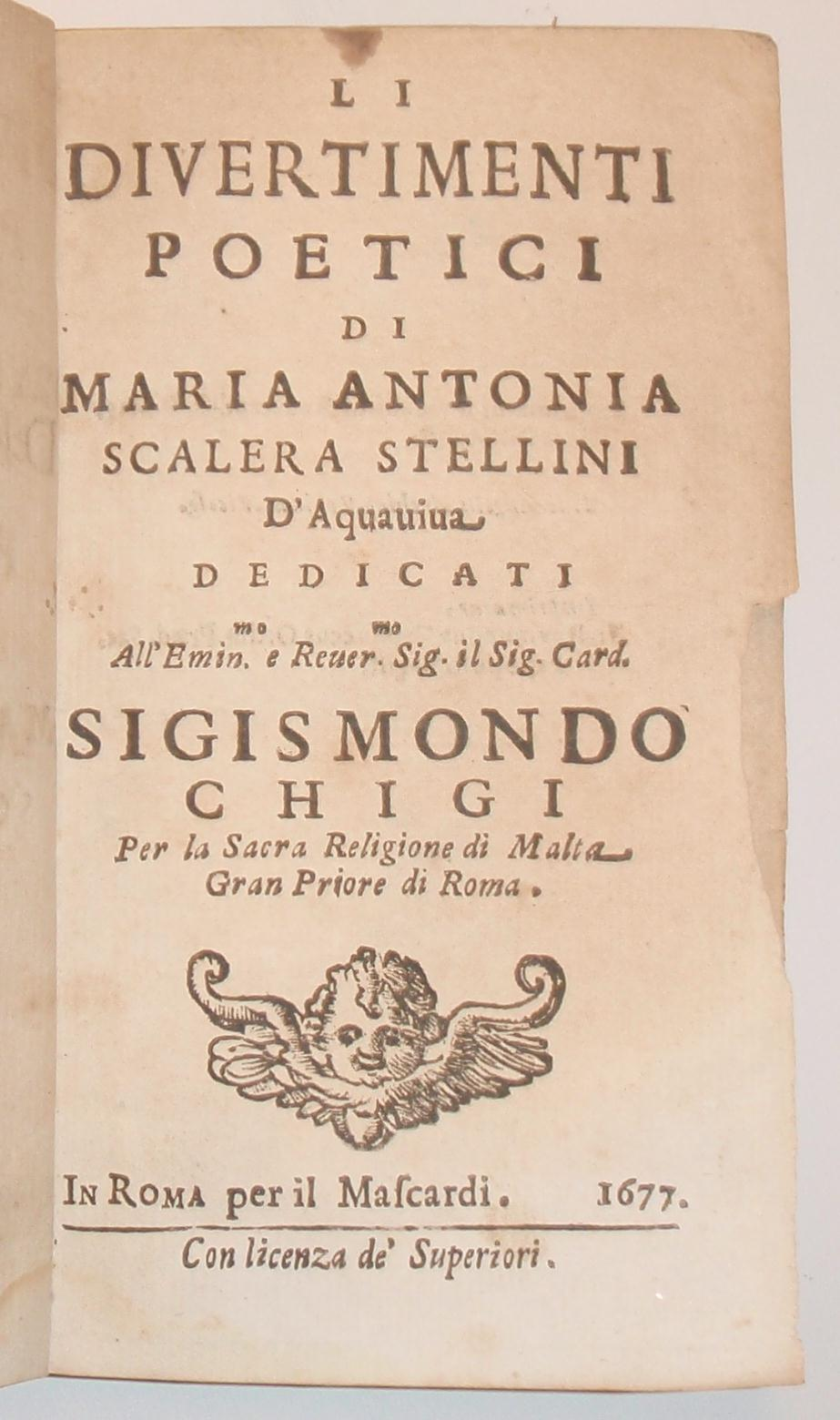
Title page of the first edition of Li divertimenti poetici by Maria Antonia Scalera Stellini, printed in Rome in 1677.

Maria Antonia Scalera Stellini (5 February 1634 – 21 September 1704) was a 17th-century Italian poet and playwright.

== Life ==
Born into a modest family in Apulia, in southern Italy, Scalera spent her youth in a convent. Following the wishes of her family, she left the convent to be married, but was soon widowed with two children. She remarried the Tuscan Silvestro Stellini, an official of Prince Agostino Chigi, a nephew of Pope Alexander VII, and went to live in their palaces at Ariccia and in Rome. Her poetic works qualified her to be received in the Academy of Arcadia on 20 June 1694, where she was named "Aricia Gnateatide".

== Works ==
In 1677, in Rome, she published a collection of poems in two volumes entitled Li divertimenti poetici ("The poetic entertainments"), which was reprinted in 1706. She also published the plays and musical dramas La Tirannide abbattuta dal trionfo della fede, Serenata spirituale, La ninfa del Tebro, Il trionfo di sant'Agata and Il Coraspe redivivo. The latter was staged in Ariccia in 1683.

Se 'l mio Canto havrà propizia sorte
Io saprò soggiogar Marte ed Astrea,
Vincer il Tempo e incatenar la Morte.

— Li divertimenti poetici, Proemio

== Sources ==
- Patrizia Guida, Scrittrici di Puglia. Percorsi storiografici femminili dal XVI al XX secolo, (Biblioteca di cultura pugliese), Congedo Editore, Galatina 2008, pp. 74–79.
- Michele Orlando, "Li Divertimenti poetici" di Maria Antonia Scalera Stellini tra ludus letterario e ripiegamento devoto. Problemi, aspetti formali, temi, in «Annali della Facoltà di Lettere e Filosofia dell'Università degli Studi di Bari», XLVII (2004), pp. 293–316.
- Giovanni Tribuzio, Li divertimenti poetici, Clori. Archivio della cantata italiana, 2024.
