= Palazzo Farnese (disambiguation) =

Palazzo Farnese is a palace in Rome, Italy.

Palazzo Farnese may also refer to:

- Palazzo Farnese, Piacenza
- Villa Farnese, Caprarola

== See also ==
- House of Farnese
