= Giuseppe Scalera =

Italian footballer

Personal information
- Full name: Giuseppe Scalera
- Date of birth: 26 January 1998 (age 28)
- Place of birth: Acquaviva delle Fonti, Italy
- Height: 1.84 m (6 ft 0 in)
- Position: Defender

Team information
- Current team: Viterbese
- Number: 30

Youth career
- Bari

Senior career*
Years	Team	Apps	(Gls)
2016–2018	Bari	3	(0)
2017	→ Fiorentina (loan)	0	(0)
2018	→ Fidelis Andria (loan)	2	(0)
2018	→ Pistoiese (loan)	0	(0)
2018–2019	Pescara	0	(0)
2019	→ Sambenedettese (loan)	0	(0)
2019–2025	Viterbese	0	(0)

International career
- Italy U16
- Italy U17
- Italy U19
- Italy U20
Medal record
Men's football
Representing Italy
FIFA U-20 World Cup
Third place	2017 South Korea
- * Club domestic league appearances and goals as of 1 gennaio 2025

Giuseppe Scalera (born 26 January 1998) is an Italian football player who plays as a defender for Viterbese.

== Club career ==
He made his professional debut in the Serie B for Bari on 17 December 2016 in a game against Avellino.

On 10 January 2019, he joined Sambenedettese on loan. However, the league refused to register the contract with Sambenedettese as it would have been his fourth club of the 2018–19 season. The lawyers argued that the Bari contract and aborted July loan to Pistoiese should not count as Bari went bankrupt soon after, making the player a free agent, but the league rejected that argument and Scalera had to return to Pescara.

On 1 August 2019, he signed with Viterbese.

== Honours ==
Italy U20

- FIFA U-20 World Cup third place: 2017
