= Acquaviva delle Fonti =

Acquaviva delle Fonti Iacquavìve (Neapolitan)
- Comune
- Comune di Acquaviva delle Fonti
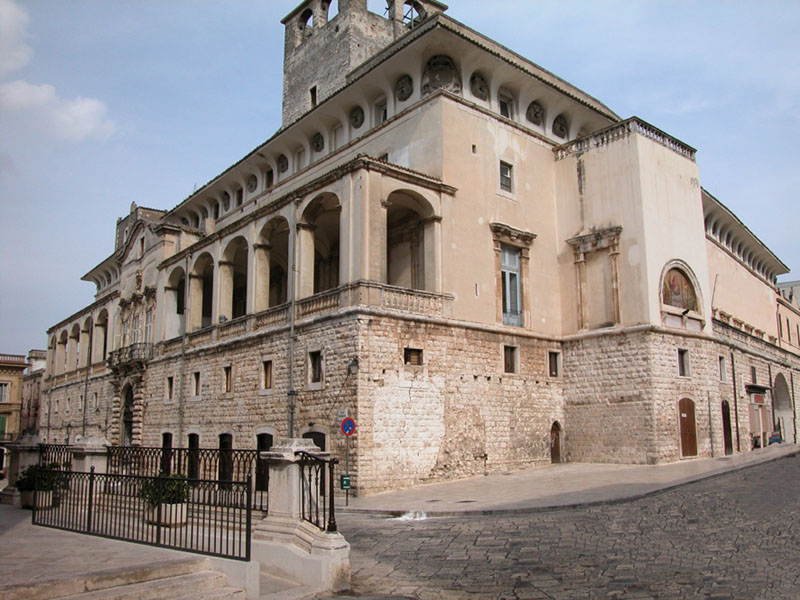
- Palazzo de Mari

- Coat of arms

- Location within Italy Location within Apulia
- Coordinates: 40°54′N 16°51′E
- Country: Italy
- Region: Apulia
- Metropolitan city: Bari (BA)
- Frazioni: Collone, Salentino

Government
  - Mayor: Davide Francesco Ruggero Carlucci

Area
  - Total: 130.98 km^{2} (50.57 sq mi)
- Elevation: 300 m (980 ft)

Population (April 30, 2017)
  - Total: 20,735
  - Density: 158.31/km^{2} (410.01/sq mi)
- Demonym: Acquavivesi
- Time zone: UTC+1 (CET)
  - Summer (DST): UTC+2 (CEST)
- Postal code: 70021
- Dialing code: 080
- Patron saint: St. Eustace, SS. Maria di Costantinopoli
- Saint day: May 20
- Website: Official website

Acquaviva delle Fonti (Barese: Iacquavìve [jakːwaˈviːvə]; known as just Acquaviva until 1863) is a town and comune of 20,446 inhabitants, in the Metropolitan City of Bari, in Apulia, Italy. Acquaviva is famous for its characteristic red onions, which have been awarded the DOP mark. The main monuments are the Palazzo de Mari (now the town hall), the Co-Cathedral of Sant'Eustachio and the ancient village. The town is located on the Murge plateau at an elevation of 300 metres (980 ft) above sea level, and is 26 kilometres (16 mi) from the Adriatic Sea and Bari, which is the biggest city of the region. The Ionian Sea is more than 45 kilometres (28 mi) to the south.

The Ospedale generale regionale Francesco Miulli in Acquaviva is one of the biggest hospitals in southern Italy, with a wide range of surgical departments and a center for the treatment of rare diseases.

== Physical geography ==
=== Territory ===
The town rises at an average altitude of 300 meters above sea level in the Apulian hinterland, on the lower Murgia of Bari, not far from both the Adriatic and Ionian coasts. Acquaviva owes its name to the large aquifer that flows in its subsoil, which extends from the old town to the foot of the Salentino hill. The flat landscape that can be observed from the Collone and Monticelli districts, the highest areas of the territory, is suddenly interrupted by depressions called "lame", or old beds, now dry rivers, shaped by karst. Typical of the lame is a luxuriant Mediterranean scrub. Other phenomena due to karst are the sinkholes, mainly located in the blades, which are holes in the ground in the shape of a funnel or bowl. The flat part of the municipal territory north of the inhabited center reaches an altitude of just under 200 m a.s.l . Proceeding to the south, until it exceeds 430 meters above sea level in the southernmost offshoots of the municipal territory from the hilly course.

=== Climate ===
The climate is Mediterranean with cool and variable winters and quite dry summers. The average annual of rainfall is below 600 mm, due to the orographic barrier to the southwest, with more frequent rains during autumn and winter and less frequent during summer (where there are however afternoon thunderstorms). The daily maximums are therefore only around 26–31 °C, with occasional maximums above 35 °C (during the arrival of the African anticyclone, especially with south-western favonic currents). The summer nights have average 17–23 °C. Winter temperatures are 9–14 °C for the highs and 4–9 °C for the lows. Between autumn and winter, fog can appear. The one from irradiation occurs in nights of high pressure, that from advection or with southern wet currents rising from the Ionian Sea or with northern wet currents from the Adriatic Sea. Frosty nights can also occur, however rarely drop below −3 °C. Snow falls almost exclusively during cold air waves from the Balkans. This happens thanks to the "humidifying" action of the Adriatic which releases humidity.

== Origin of the name ==
The name Acquaviva comes from the superficial town aquifer that extends under the municipal territory, already known in Roman times. In the past the city was known for its abundance of water, so much so that during periods of drought came people from other countries for water. Traces of the importance of water for the community are the numerous wells in the old town and in the countryside. These are called 'ngegne, machines by animal traction that drew water from artesian wells.

== History ==
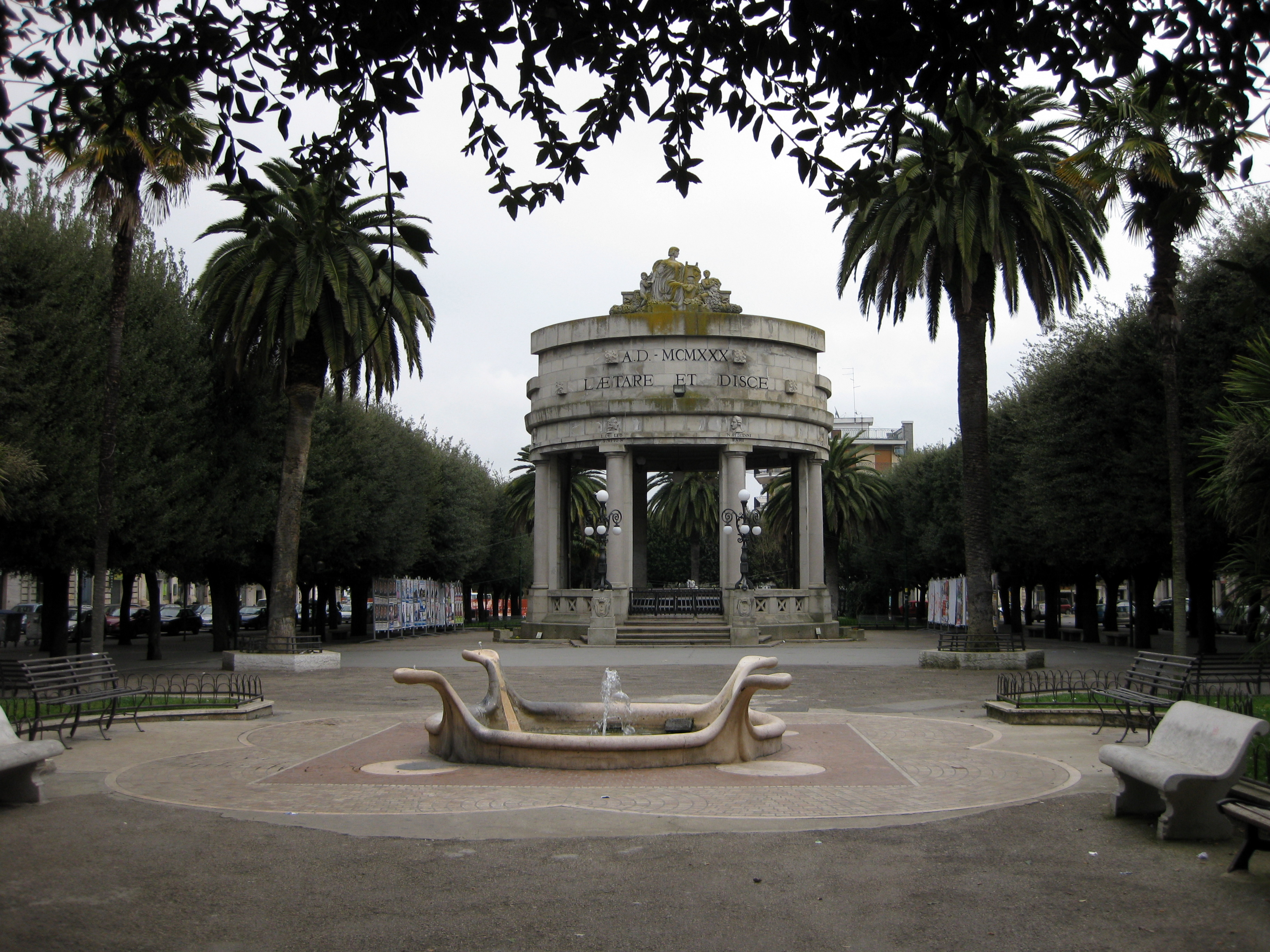
Piazza Vittorio Emanuele II

Its origins are uncertain. Some studies believe that it rises around the 4th to 5th century BC in the Salentino area (hill located a few kilometers from the town and dominating a large flat and very fertile area); others support that the first Acquavivese settlements could date back to the period between the 6th and 8th centuries AD. It is certain that in Salentino there was an ancient settlement because the excavations carried out in 1976 confirmed it. Several houses with hearths have been unearthed and burials of human bones have been found next to them. The fertility of the lands downstream, the richness of the spring waters or some devastation were the causes that pushed the inhabitants to move towards the current urban center. The toponym in Latin times was: Aquaviva. The current Acquaviva, in fact, was inhabited by emigrants from the ancient villages of Malano, Ventauro, San Pietro, San Marco, Sant'Angelo and Salentino. Acquaviva from the earliest age grew rapidly, compared to other villages, thanks to its climate and the presence of aquifers and it's thanks to this latter wealth that, after many centuries, "delle Fonti" was added to the name Acquaviva. The underground water, collected in the aquifers, was exploited for agricultural purposes and pulled up by the noria, according to the local language the 'ngegne, which was a machine activated by a donkey or a mule that circled endlessly (still today this object is visible in Piazza Vittorio Emanuele II). Its name is among the episcopal seats of the early times of the Church. Later it belonged to the Normans, who built the Castle, passed to the Swabians who modified the castle with elements typical of the Frederician period, to the Angevins and the Aragonese. Passed to the Prince of Taranto Giovanni Antonio Orsini Del Balzo, the feud of Acquaviva was assigned as a dowry in 1456 to his daughter Caterina, wife of the Duke of Atri Giulio Antonio Acquaviva, together with the fiefs of Noci, Turi, Conversano, Castellana, Bitonto, Bitetto and Gioia del Colle. In 1499 the fief of Acquaviva belonged to the County of Conversano.

The marquis of Acquaviva, together with the County of Gioia, passed in 1597 to Giosia and his son Alberto Acquaviva d'Aragona, was put up for sale in 1614 by the latter due to financial difficulties. On that date in Naples at the Regia Camera della Sommaria the auction notice was posted with the price estimated by the Regi Tavolari and so Acquaviva was described: «Acquaviva is a rich and populated land, 1700 fires (8 500 inhabitants) of a beautiful site, presents the convenience of negotiating oils being in the heart of the province rich in this fruit. The proximity to the sea offers the possibility of disposing of it, for Venetia, Ferrara and for other infinite places». The sale of Acquaviva, together with Gioia, took place on 4 March 1614 and it was purchased by the genoese businessman marquis Paride Pinelli. In 1623, on the death of the latter, the fiefs of Acquaviva and Gioia was held in rent for 35 years (1629–1664) by Giangirolamo Acquaviva d'Aragona, by the Genoese Antoniotto Spinola, by the Marquis Caracciolo di Santeramo and then by the prince of Cassano, Gaspare Ayerbo. In 1663 Giovanni Girolamo Molignani, on the ashes of a previous poetic-literary academy, founded the Accademia dei Ravvivati (Academy of the Revived). The fief was finally bought in 1665 for 216,000 ducats by the genoese Marquis of Assigliano Carlo de Mari. The new feudal lord, with whom the de Mari family's dominion began which will last for over a century and a half, fixed his residence in the old castle of Acquaviva delle Fonti, transforming it into a wonderful baronial palace. The transformation work of Carlo de Mari and his successors on the castle is radical: they completely transfigured it, bringing it to a structure very close to the current one, having the status of a noble palace. The de Mari dynasty was characterized and studded by despotism, usurpations and exploitation to the people of Acquaviva, Gioia and Castellaneta until the abolition of feudality in 1806.

=== Feudal lords ===
==== 12th century ====
- Cornulo (1129);
- Roberto Brizio (1136);
- Roberto Gurgulione (1145).

==== 13th century ====
- Filippo Cinardi (1240);
- Consiglio da Bari (1266);
- Galgano de Marra (1269);
- Guglielmo I de Sateguevilla (1270);
- Guglielmo II de Sateguevilla (1270);
- Guglielmo III de Sateguevilla (1282);
- Guglielmo d'Alneto (1284).

==== 14th century ====
- Raimondo Berengario (1303);
- Azzo VIII, signore di Ferrara (1305);
- Bertrando del Balzo, Conte d'Andria (1309);
- Francesco I del Balzo, Duca d'Andria (1351);
- Luigi d'Enghien (1375 circa);
- Luigi di Sanseverino (1382);
- Franceschello Guindazzo (1382);
- Pietro di Lussemburgo (1397).

==== 15th century ====
- Antonio de Sansovisiis (1407);
- Alberico da Barbiano (1409);
- Giovannella Gesualdo e Domenico Attendolo Sforza (1414);
- Giacomo II di Borbone-La Marche, principe di Taranto e duca di Calabria (1415);
- Maria d'Enghien e Giovanni Antonio Orsini Del Balzo, principe di Taranto (1416);
- Giovanni Antonio Orsini Del Balzo, principe di Taranto (1429);
- Jacopo Caldora, duca di Bari (1434);
- Antonio Caldora, duca di Bari (1439);
- Giovanni Antonio Orsini Del Balzo, duca di Bari e principe di Taranto (1440);
- Francesco II del Balzo, duca d'Andria (1450 circa);
- Pirro del Balzo, duca d'Andria e signore di Acquaviva (1482);
- Federico IV d'Aragona, duca d'Andria e signore di Acquaviva (1487);
- Giovanna di Trastámara, principessa d'Aragona e regina consorte di Ferdinando I di Napoli (1496);
- Andrea Matteo Acquaviva d'Aragona (1499).

==== 16th century ====
- Prospero Colonna (1503);
- Andrea Matteo Acquaviva d'Aragona (1505);
- Giovanni Antonio Donato Acquaviva d'Aragona (1511);
- Giovanni Girolamo I Acquaviva d'Aragona (1554);
- Alberto Acquaviva d'Aragona, undecimo duca d'Atri e conte di Gioia (1575);
- Giosia Acquaviva d'Aragona, duodecimo duca d'Atri (1597).

==== 17th–18th century ====
- Ascanio de Scribanis (1611);
- Paride Pinelli, marchese di Civitasantangelo (1614);
- Giangirolamo Acquaviva d'Aragona (1629);
- Antoniotto Spinola (1640);
- Giovanni Battista Caracciolo, Marquis of Santeramo(1658);
- Gaspare Ayerbo d'Aragona, prince of Cassano (1664);
- Carlo I de Mari, first prince of Acquaviva and second marquise of Assigliano (1665);
- Carlo II de Mari, second prince of Acquaviva and third marquise of Assigliano (1697);
- Giovanbattista de Mari, third prince of Acquaviva (1740);
- Carlo III de Mari, fourth prince of Acquaviva (1775).

== Monuments and places of interest ==
=== Religious architectures ===
==== Co-cathedral of Sant'Eustachio martyr ====
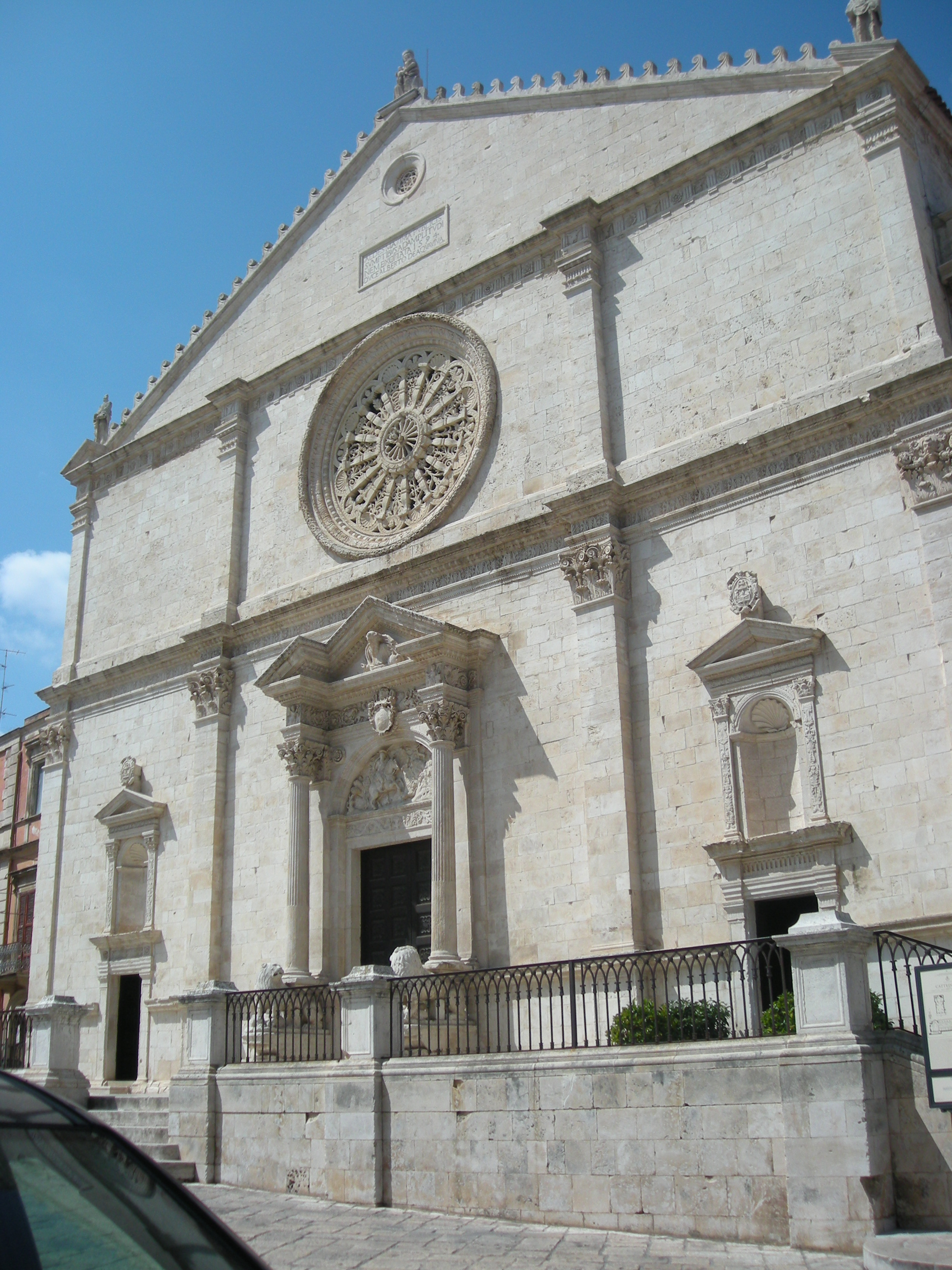
Cathedral of Sant'Eustachio martyr, main faceade

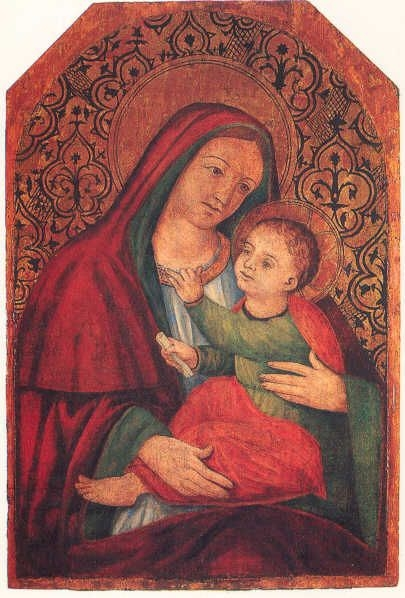
Madonna di Costantinopoli, icon attributed to Francesco Palvisino, 16th century.

The co-cathedral of Sant'Eustachio martyr was built in the 12th century by the Norman feudal lord Roberto Gurgulione. It was rebuilt and enlarged around the second half of the sixteenth century by Count Alberto Acquaviva d'Aragona and today retains the Renaissance style. The façade is divided into three orders: in the central one it is possible to admire the magnificent rose window with sixteen arms richly decorated. On the central portal with an interrupted cusp erected by Corinthian style columns resting on stone lions, there is represented God the Father, under whom there is the lunette with the bas-relief with the scene of the conversion of the Roman general Eustachio. Inside, the basilica-cathedral features polychrome marble decorations made in the nineteenth century by Monsignor Giandomenico Falconi in 1860. The crypt, still covered with polychrome marble and stucco on the vaults, has three altars: on the right one in marble dedicated to Saint Eustace and his family, in the center a silver one dedicated to the Blessed Sacrament and on the left, again in silver, one dedicated to the Blessed Virgin Mary of Constantinople, patron saint of Acquaviva. This last altar preserves a painting of the Madonna of Constantinople attributed to Francesco Palvisino and dated between 1540 and 1560.

==== Church of Santa Maria Maggiore ====
The church of Santa Maria Maggiore dates back to the 16th century and was consecrated in 1620. Inside it is decorated in the Baroque style.

==== Church of Santa Lucia ====
The church of Santa Lucia, located on the outskirts of the town, appears to be very simple from a structural point of view. Externally the facade is a gable and internally it has a single nave. At the bottom of the church there is the bell tower.

=== Civil architecture ===
==== Episcopal palace ====
The episcopal palace was built in the 19th century close to the cathedral. Commissioned by Bishop Giandomenico Falconi, it was designed by the architect Luigi Castellucci.

==== De Mari-Doria palace ====
Built by the Genoese nobleman and Neapolitan patrician Carlo I de Mari, prince of Acquaviva, marquis of Assigliano and also owner of Gioia del Colle and Castellaneta, at the end of the 17th century. He incorporated the structures of the former Norman castle of which today saw various details, including the remains of an octagonal tower. The monumental building was probably the work of the Genoese architect Riccobuono. The main facade with a large loggia, sees a central triple balustrade balcony on the grandiose lower entrance portal in Neapolitan style. Particular is the succession of apotropaiche masks that runs along the final cornice of the noble palace; it has an internal court with a large staircase that leads to the loggia on the first floor where there is the heraldic coat of arms of the princes of Mari-Doria; here there are two beautiful entrance portals that lead the inscription "Carolvs De Mari Aqvaviva Princeps". The whole structure has over one hundred internal rooms. The palace passed in the nineteenth century to Sante Alberotanza, a nobleman from Mola di Bari, and was subsequently bought by the then University of Acquaviva which made it the municipal seat of Acquaviva delle Fonti.

==== Cassarmonica ====
The Cassarmonica was built was built in 1930, with the financial contribution of the citizens of Acquaviva, to honor the local band. It is built entirely with prefabricated reinforced concrete blocks (rare example, together with the sound box of Rapallo, in Liguria).

=== Military architectures ===
==== Missile field ====
On the territory of Acquaviva delle Fonti, between January and April 1960 on the old road of Sannicandro di Bari, not far from the town of Acquaviva, was built an Italian Air Force base, nicknamed by the population the "Campo dei Missili". Here was located exactly the base no.9 of the 2nd Squadron of the 111th Group of the 36th Strategic Interdiction Air Brigade created to host the PGM-19 Jupiter, medium range thermonuclear warhead missiles (ie with a range between 1000 and 5500 km) pointed at the Soviet Union. Seven bases were also operational from 1958 to 1963 on the Murge along the route of the Via Appia in Spinazzola, Gravina, Casal Sabini-Altamura, Ceraso-Altamura, Gioia del Colle, Laterza and Mottola, while two bases were located in Basilicata, near Irsina and Matera. Each of the bases had installed three Jupiter missiles inside, each of which with power equal to about one hundred atomic bombs like the one launched on Hiroshima. On March 1, 1957, the first Jupiter IRBM (Intermediate Range Ballistic Missile) missile was launched from the US base at Cape Canaveral. A little more than two years later, starting from September 5, 1959, the installation of the "Jupiter weapon system" began in Italy, an operation that ended on June 20, 1961, when the last base became operational. In January 1963, the US communicated to the Italian government the decision taken during the development of the Cuban missile crisis to retire the missiles. In June of the same year, the last Jupiter missile was removed from the Murgia and embarked overseas.

=== Natural areas ===
To the north of the urban center, along the right of the Baronial blade, WWF Italy protects a shrub area called Oasis "Gioacchino Catone" and extended for 2.5 hectares.

== Society ==
=== Ethnicities and foreign minorities ===
Foreigners who live in the town as of December 31, 2019, were 732, equal to 3.58% of the total population. The most numerous communities are:

- Albania: 253
- Romania: 167
- India: 53
- Georgia: 51
- Senegal: 42
- China: 38
- Morocco: 25

=== Institutions, organizations and associations ===
Acquaviva delle Fonti is the seat of the ecclesiastical regional hospital Francesco Miulli, one of the largest and most important hospitals in the Puglia Region. The town is part of the Authentic Italian Villages association (Associazione Borghi Autentici d'Italia).

=== Life quality ===
In the 1980s, Acquaviva had a significant strategic and economic importance throughout the Bari area due to the presence, on its territory, of the Miulli hospital and of important industries active in the dairy, plant engineering and services sectors. In the mid-90s began the decline and withdrawal of the Acquavivese square which, slowly and thanks to the choices of the local administrators, lost the prestige of the past to the advantage of other neighbourding municipalities. The Francesco Miulli regional hospital and an industrial area full of SMEs guarantee residents a per capita income among the highest in the whole of Southern Italy (ISTAT 2007 data).

== Culture ==
=== Museum ===
In the de Mari's palace there was a permanent exhibition of archaeological finds entitled "Salentino, at the origins of the city". The collection consisting of about a hundred ceramics of Apulian and Peucet origin, coming from the archaeological area of Salentino dates back to the centuries BC from, sixth and third, during the excavation campaigns carried out between 1976 and 1979 –, blades and scrapers dating back to the lithic industry of the Upper Paleolithic from the Curtomartino Cave and other finds from the areas of Ventauro and Baronaggio were found.

This exhibition has fused into the AMA (acronym for Acquaviva Archaeological Museum), inaugurated in October 2020 and also located in the town hall.

=== Media ===
City information is edited by the free monthly L'Eco...di Acquaviva, published by the Progetto Spazio 2000 association and distributed free of charge, and La Piazza, bimonthly published by the association of the same name. They are joined by the television broadcaster TeleMajg, which broadcasts over the air in analogue, digital and live streaming form, and the telematic newspapers www.acquavivalive.it and www.acquavivanet.it. The information site www.acquavivapartecipa.it is also active. There is also a radio station, Radio Futura (FM 98.500 MHz), with an operational base in the industrial area.

=== Theater ===
In Piazza Vittorio Emanuele the "Sebastiano Arturo Luciani" Municipal Theater, built in the early twentieth century and owned by the municipality, is located. Since 1983 it has been in a state of neglect due to the expiry of the management contract. In recent years it has undergone internal and external restoration interventions in order not to compromise its static nature. The municipal administration is currently studying hypotheses of use and / or conversion of the structure.

In April 2019, some scenes of the film Tolo Tolo, with director and protagonist Checco Zalone, were shot in Acquaviva. The shooting took place in a bank, in the Palazzo de Mari and in some streets of the historic center near the church of Santa Chiara.

=== Cooking ===
The city is known for the sweet onion that grows on its land, called the red onion of Acquaviva delle Fonti. The production is very limited (about 200 quintals per year) since its cultivation still uses traditional and rudimentary methods to preserve its aroma and fragrance. The red onion of Acquaviva and its famous "calzone" are celebrated with two festivals that take place at the end of July and mid-October each year.

=== Events ===
==== Celebration of Madonna di Costantinopoli ====
The patronal feast of the Madonna of Constantinople takes place over four days, culminating in the first Tuesday of September. Starting from the previous week, the image of the Virgin is carried in procession in seven days in the seven parishes of Acquaviva (peregrinatio Mariae). On Sunday morning, after the celebration, there is the rite of the enthronement. On Tuesday morning the solemn pontifical ceremony is celebrated in the square, at the end of which the mayor hands over the keys of the city to the Protector, and in the evening the image of the Madonna is carried in procession. The religious feast ends on Wednesday evening, when the image of the Madonna leaves the Cathedral again for the procession around Piazza Vittorio Emanuele II.

On Sunday evening there is a historical procession that commemorates the arrival of the painting (it is said that it comes from Constantinople and that, having arrived in Bari by sea, it was brought to Acquaviva on a cart pulled by oxen).

According to a tradition dating back to 1848, on Tuesday evening, the culmination of the party, a hot-air balloon is launched, weighing about one quintal and 21 meters high.

== Infrastructure and transport ==
=== Roads ===
The most important provincial roads that cross the territory of Acquaviva delle Fonti are:

- the SP 20, which connects it to Gioia-Santeramo;
- the SP 48, which connects it to Cassano delle Murge;
- the SP 75, which connects it to Casamassima;
- the SP 76, which connects it to Sannicandro di Bari;
- the SP 82, which connects it to Gioia del Colle;
- the SP 83, which connects it to Adelfia;
- the SP 125, which connects it to Sammichele di Bari;
- the SP 127, which connects it to Santeramo in Colle;
- the SP 205 and 205 bis, ie its ring road.

=== Railways ===
The Acquaviva delle Fonti station is located on the Bari-Taranto line at a similar kilometer distance from the two capitals, served by Trenitalia with 36 daily trips and 4 trips with replacement buses, and is located on the Bologna-Taranto-Reggio Calabria route.

To serve the Missile Field, in the 1960s the Le Chiasce station was built, near the Scappagrano district, on the original route of the Bari-Taranto line.

== Other administrative information ==
The town of Acquaviva delle Fonti was part of the Mountain community of the south-east Bari Murgia until 2010, the year of its definitive suppression. It grouped together 7 municipalities of the former Province of Bari.

== Sports ==
=== Football ===
Mention is made of Unione Sportiva Acquavivese, a historic football club that competed in the second and third tiers of the national football system, the Prima Divisione, between 1928 and 1929, and which remained active until at least the immediate post-war period. After the failing of ACD Acquaviva (founded in 1996) in 2011–2012, the football scene in Acquaviva is currently represented by Atletico Acquaviva (playing in red and blue) and Football Acquaviva (playing in white and blue), both of them play in the Puglia Promotion championship for the 2020–2021 season. The football match between the two mentioned teams is known as the Cassarmonica Derby.

=== Basketball ===
In other team sports, the ASD Basket Acquaviva Team is included.

=== Cycling ===
The Fausto Coppi Cycling Group, founded in 1981, is the longest-running sports association in the city. It organizes a cycle walk every year to promote the use of ecological means of transport.

=== Athletics ===
The athletics club Amatori Atletica Acquaviva is credited among the most important buildings.

=== Skateboarding ===
In October 2019, the first skate park in the country was inaugurated at the "Tommaso Valeriano" sports center.

=== Sport facilities ===
The main sports facilities in Acquaviva are the Giammaria stadium and the "Tommaso Valeriano" sports center. Athletics competitions and football matches of the aforementioned teams are held at the stadium, while volleyball matches are held in the sports hall.

== Notable people ==
- Pietro Capodiferro (1882-1953), musician
- Carmelo Colamonico (1882-1973), geographer
- Carlo de Vincentiis (1622-1677), violinist
- Mirko Eramo (born 1989), footballer
- Francesco Paolo Masullo (1679-1733), singer
- Domenico Antonio Mele (1647-?), poet
- Mario Napolitano (1910-1995), chess player
- Domenico Nettis (born 1972), athlete
- Andrea Pastore (born 1994), footballer
- Giuseppe Scalera (born 1998), footballer
- Maria Antonia Scalera Stellini (1634-1704), poet
- Alessandro Vogliacco (born 1998), footballer

== Twin towns ==
Acquaviva delle Fonti is twinned with:

- Cesano Boscone, Lombardy, Italy
- San Miguel de Allende, Guanajuato, Mexico
- Taranto, Apulia, Italy

== Bibliography ==
- Nunzio Mastrorocco; Martino Mastrorocco (2003). La nostra Storia – Cronistoria della Città di Acquaviva delle Fonti. Sammichele di Bari: SUMA Editore.
