= Acquaviva delle Fonti Cathedral =

Roman Catholic Cathedral in Acquaviva delle Fonti, Italy

- Duomo di Acquaviva delle Fonti; Concattedrale di Sant'Eustachio
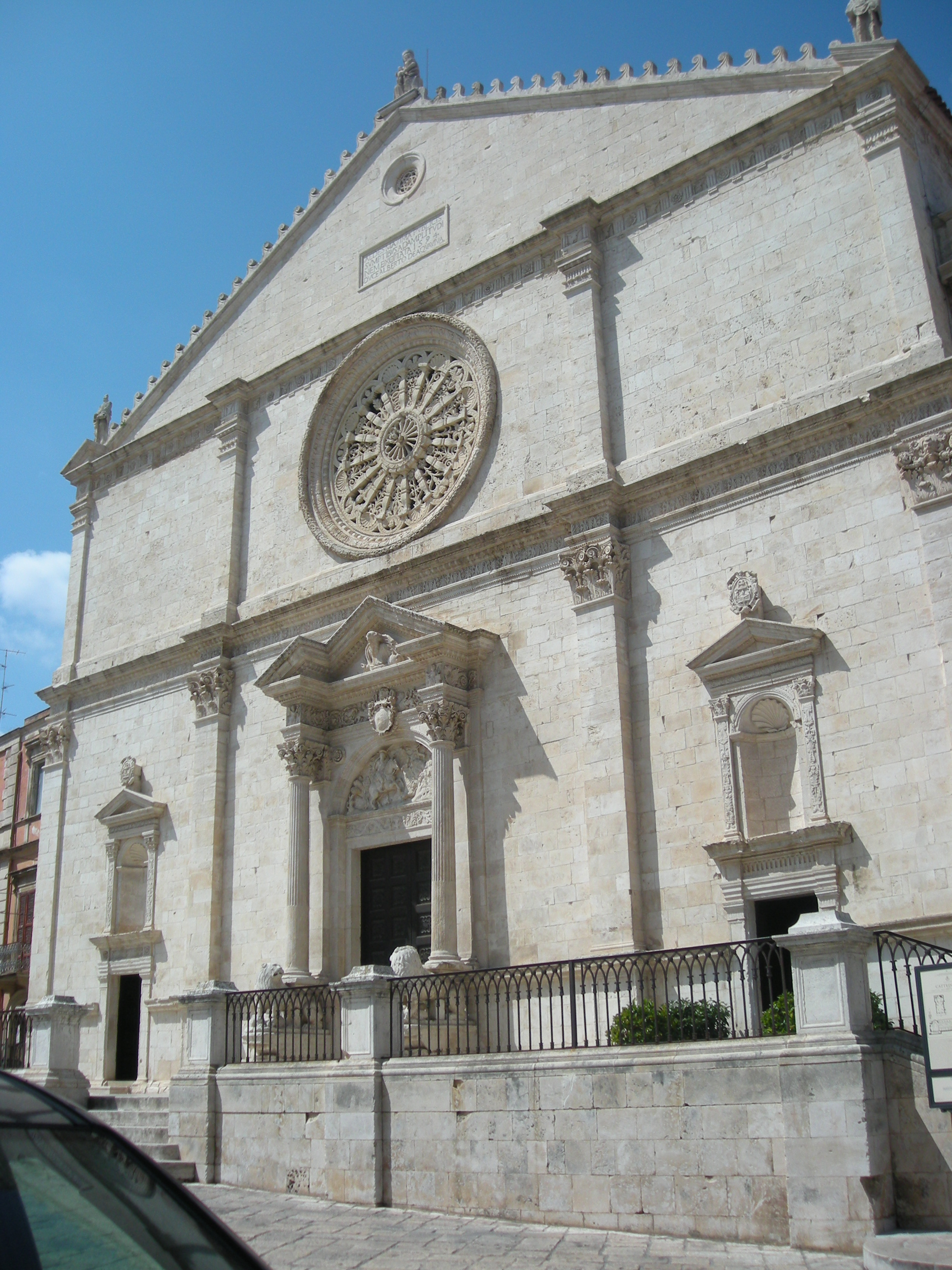
- Façade

- Location within Apulia

Religion
- Affiliation: Roman Catholic Church
- Province: Diocese of Altamura-Gravina-Acquaviva delle Fonti
- Ecclesiastical or organisational status: co-cathedral
- Year consecrated: 1623
- Status: active

Location
- Municipality: Acquaviva delle Fonti
- State: Italy
- Coordinates: 40.8967°N 16.8417°E

Architecture
- Style: Romanesque, Renaissance
- Groundbreaking: 1158
- Completed: 1594

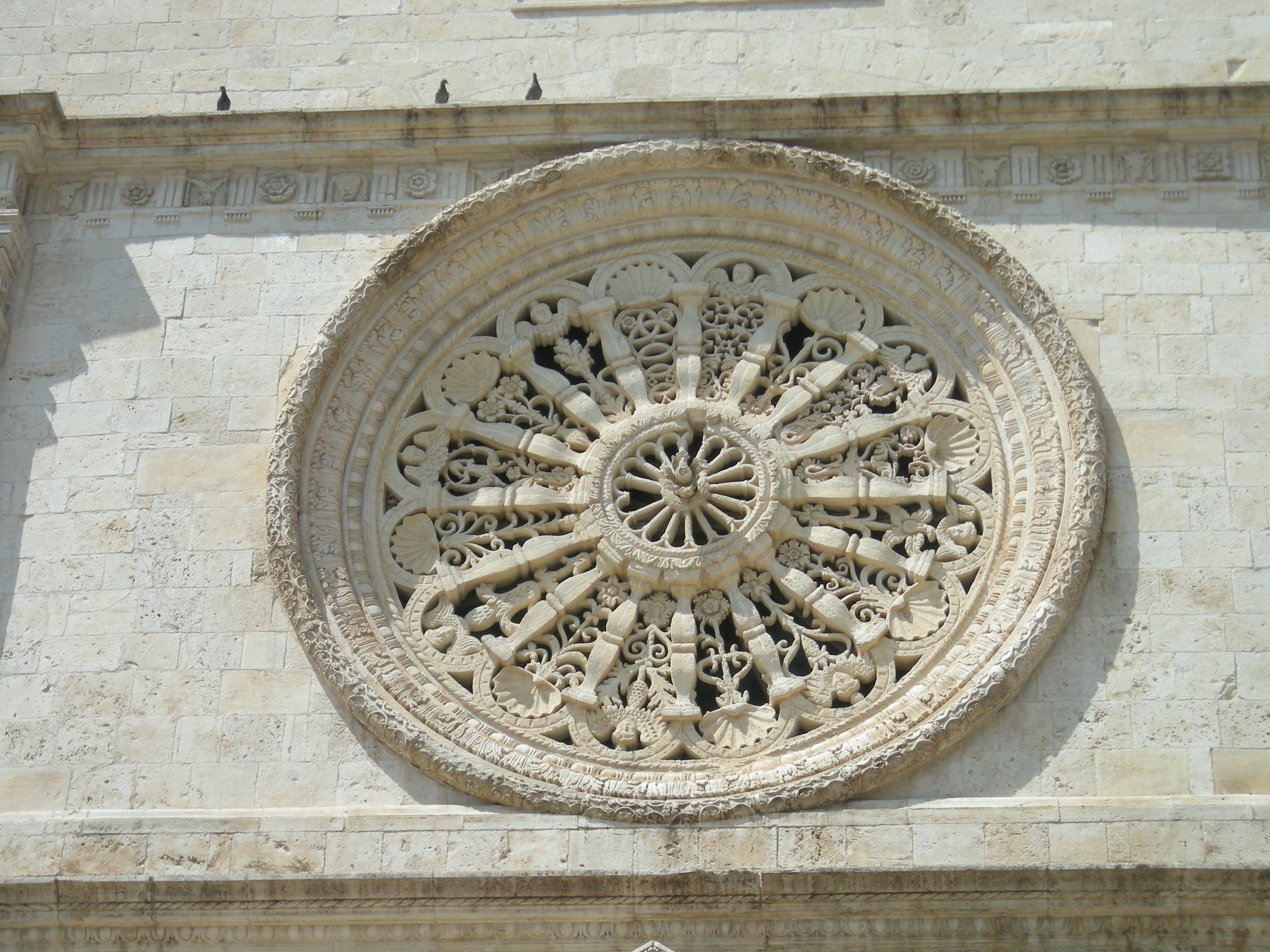
The rose window

Acquaviva delle Fonti Cathedral (Italian: Duomo di Acquaviva delle Fonti; Concattedrale di Sant'Eustachio) is the main church of Acquaviva delle Fonti, dedicated to Saint Eustace. It is now a co-cathedral of the Diocese of Altamura-Gravina-Acquaviva delle Fonti. Previously it was the palatine church of Acquaviva delle Fonti, which became part of the territorial prelature of Altamura e Acquaviva delle Fonti formed by Pius IX in 1848, when he added Acquaviva to the existing territorial prelature of Altamura.

== History ==
Built in Romanesque style in the 12th century (1158) on the ruins of a small temple with Messapian origins by the will of the Norman feudal lord Roberto Gurguglione, it was rebuilt in a Renaissance style in the 16th century. The church was originally dedicated to the Assumption of the Virgin Mary and only later was renamed for the martyr Saint Eustace.

The primitive church, now run down and insufficient for the needs of the increased population, was rebuilt from 1529, when Giovanni Antonio Donato Acquaviva was the feudal lord of Acquaviva. Finished and opened for worship in 1594 during the government of Alberto Acquaviva, the church was consecrated in 1623 in honor of Saint Eustace by the archbishop of Bari in Canosa, Ascanio Gesualdo.

Since the beginning it was called palatine, that is, belonging to the king (from the Latin palatium meaning "royal palace"), probably to preserve it from the aims of the archbishop of Bari. Palatine churches for their jurisdiction did not depend on the ordinary ecclesiastical authority, but rather that of the king, who usually appointed and paid clerics chosen by him. There are currently four such churches on Apulian soil: the cathedral in question in Acquaviva, the cathedral of the Assumption of Saint Mary in Altamura, the Basilica of Saint Nicholas in Bari and the Sanctuary of Saint Michael the Archangel in Monte Sant'Angelo.

On 13 January 1859, after a stop in Acquaviva and on his way to Bari for the marriage of the Crown Prince Francesco with Maria Sophie of Bavaria, the penultimate king of the Kingdom of the Two Sicilies, Ferdinand II, attended the plain mass in the crypt of the cathedral.

Location of Acquaviva delle Fonti Cathedral

== Description ==
=== Exterior ===
The main façade has a cusp, tripartite by pilasters and divided into two orders (the first is Corinthian, the second Doric), all in Renaissance style, while the rest of the façades have an architectural style reminiscent of Apulian Romanesque.

A Renaissance rose window opens in the center of the frontal prospect, tending towards Mannerism, formed by sixteen columns arranged in the shape of rays and connected by small arches. Under these are alternating shell valves and winged heads of cherubs. From the center of the rose window protrudes a phytomorphic lithic figure.

The main portal has a finely decorated prothyrum. The columns supporting the pediment rest on two stylophoric lions.

The side portals are surmounted by two niches that are empty today. Each of them has installed at its apex a bas-relief depicting an ancient version of the coat of arms of Acquaviva delle Fonti.

The archivolt of this portal has a bas-relief depicting Saint Eustace's conversion.

The façade ends on the top with a broad triangular fifth, in the center of which is a plaque commemorating the name of the feudal lord of Alberto Acquaviva. On the three vertices are stone sculptures depicting Saint Peter and Saint Paul on the sides and Virgin Mary sitting with Child on her knees in the center.

=== Interior ===
The interior, with a Latin cross layout, is divided into three naves with vaulted roof. The main vault is supported by large arches, which rest on stone pillars with half-projecting columns in the direction of the aforementioned arches. The perimeter walls have half-extended columns, surmounted by false pillars supporting the arches. The vaults, as well as the pillars and columns, are decorated with stuccoes. The high altar, dating back to the 16th century, is dedicated to the Virgin of Constantinople. The oil paintings, which adorned the primitive church, were donated to the churches of Saint Dominic, Saint Mary the Greatest, Saint Augustine and Santa Maria della Libera during the reconstruction. The monumental organ was donated to the church by Bishop Tommaso Cirielli.

=== Crypt ===
The crypt, probably built at the same time as the primitive church, is in the shape of a parallelogram and is covered by twenty-four cross vaults, supported by fourteen marble Ionic order columns in the center and small pillars protruding from the perimeter walls. Leaning against the rear wall are three valuable altars. On the first of them is a picture of Saint Eustace, on the sides of which two marble sculptures rest on corbels, representing respectively the saint's wife, Theopiste, and his sons Theopistos and Agapios.

The central altar, built in 1693 and dedicated to the Blessed Sacrament, is surrounded by balustrades made of French breccia. The front altar, all in double silver sheet, has an octagonal temple surmounted by a small dome and divided into three tiers decorated with various figures. A large tabernacle stands out on the altar.

The third altar, built in 1753 and dedicated to the Virgin of Constantinople, is entirely covered with silver sheets. Above it is a painting attributed to Francesco Palvisino depicting the aforementioned Madonna with Child in her arms. The images of the Madonna and the Child are adorned with two golden crowns.

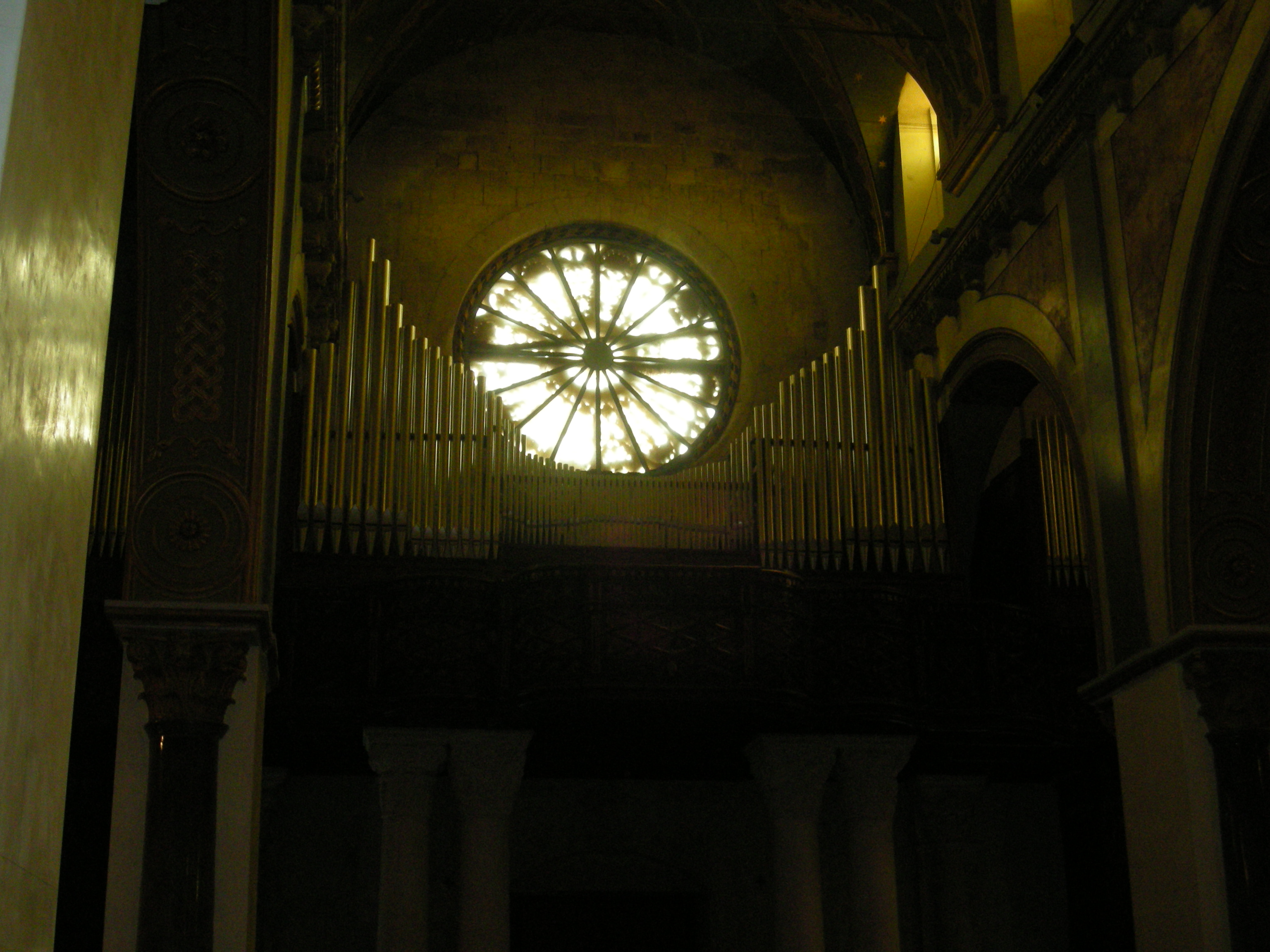
The Vegezzi Bossi organ of the co-cathedral of Acquaviva delle Fonti

On the choir loft in the counterfaçade is the pipe organ, built in 1905 by Carlo Vegezzi Bossi; the instrument, over time, has undergone major restoration and refurbishment, including that of 1968 by Leonardo Consoli, and that of 2001–2004 by the Continiello organ company, during which – among other things – the wooden case, the work of Acquaviva's Paolo Tritto, was removed and a new moveable console was provided.

The instrument, with electrical action, has three keyboards of 58 notes each and a concave-radial pedalboard of 30. Below is its arrangement:

I – Positivo
Bordone	16'
Flauto traverso	8'
Voce dulçan	8'
Viola Gamba	8'
Fugara	4'
Flauto armonico	4'
Piccolo armonico	2'
Unda maris	8'
Clarinetto	8'

II – Grand'Organo
Principale	16'
Principale diapason	8'
Principale dolce	8'
Bordone	8'
Dulciana	8'
Salicionale	8'
Ottava	4'
Ottava dolce	4'
Flauto camino	4'
Quinta	5.1/3'
Duodecima	2.2/3'
Decimaquinta	2'
Ripieno	6 file
Tromba	8'

III – Espressivo
Controgamba	16'
Eufonio	8'
Principale eolina	8'
Bordone	8'
Ottava eolina	4'
Flauto	4'
Ottavina	2'
Ripieno	4 file
Viola da Gamba	8'
Concerto Viole	3 file
Voce Eterea	8'
Oboe	8'
Voce corale	8'

Pedale
Contrabbasso	16'
Violone	16'
Subbasso	16'
Ottava	8'
Bordone	8'
Violoncello	8'
Ottava	4'
Bombarda	16'
