= 1572 conclave =

Election of Catholic Pope Gregory XIII

Papal conclave May 1572

Dates and location
- 12–13 May 1572; Apostolic Palace, Papal States

Key officials
- Dean: Giovanni Morone
- Sub-dean: Cristoforo Madruzzo
- Camerlengo: Luigi Cornaro
- Protodeacon: Innocenzo del Monte

Election
- Ballots: 1

Elected pope
- Ugo Boncompagni; Name taken: Gregory XIII
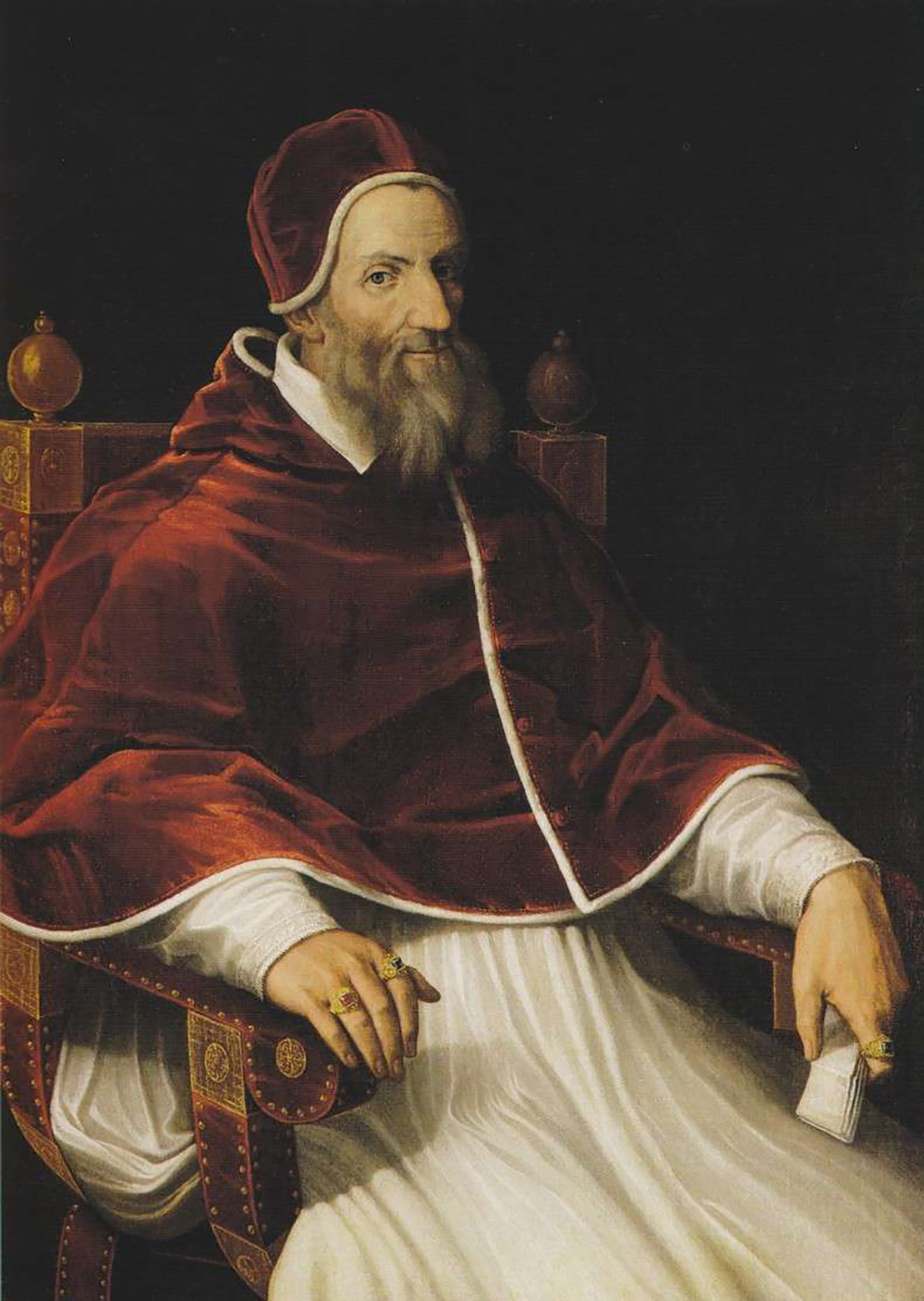

The 1572 papal conclave (12–13 May), convoked after the death of Pope Pius V, elected Cardinal Ugo Boncompagni, who took the name Gregory XIII.

== List of participants ==
Pope Pius V died on May 1, 1572, at the age of 68. To date, he is the only canonized pope between Celestine V (1294) and Pius X (1903–1914). Fifty-three out of sixty-six Cardinals participated in the election of his successor:

- Giovanni Girolamo Morone (created cardinal on June 2, 1542) – Cardinal-Bishop of Ostia e Velletri; Dean of the Sacred College of Cardinals; Cardinal-protector of Austria; Cardinal-protector of the Order of Cistercians; Cardinal-protector of the Ethiopian Catholic Church
- Cristoforo Madruzzo (June 2, 1542) – Cardinal-Bishop of Porto e Santa Rufina; Sub-Dean of the Sacred College of Cardinals; Bishop of Brixen; Legate in Gualdo; Governor of Spoleto
- Otto Truchess von Waldburg (December 19, 1544) – Cardinal-Bishop of Palestrina; Bishop of Augsburg; Cardinal-protector of Germany
- Alessandro Farnese (December 18, 1534) – Cardinal-Bishop of Frascati; commendatario of S. Lorenzo in Damaso; Archpriest of the patriarchal Vatican Basilica; Vice-Chancellor of the Holy Roman Church; Archbishop of Monreale; Cardinal-protector of the Kingdom of Poland and of the Kingdom of Sicily; Cardinal-protector of the Republic of Genoa and of the Republic of Ragusa; Cardinal-protector of the Orders of Benedictines and Servites
- Giulio Feltre della Rovere (July 27, 1547) – Cardinal-Bishop of Sabina; Archbishop of Ravenna; Governor of Loreto; Cardinal-protector of the Order of Capuchins
- Giovanni Ricci (November 20, 1551) – Cardinal-Bishop of Albano; Archbishop of Pisa
- Scipione Rebiba (December 20, 1555) – Cardinal-Priest of S. Maria in Trastevere; Protopriest of the Sacred College of Cardinals
- Fulvio della Corgna, O.S.Io.Hieros. (November 20, 1551) – Cardinal-Priest of S. Adriano; Bishop of Perugia
- Niccolò Caetani (December 22, 1536) – Cardinal-Priest of S. Eustachio; Archbishop of Capua; Cardinal-protector of Scotland
- Ippolito II d'Este (December 20, 1538) – Cardinal-Priest of S. Maria Nuova; Cardinal-protector of France
- Giacomo Savelli (December 19, 1539) – Cardinal-Priest of S. Maria in Cosmedin; Vicar General of Rome; Administrator of Benevento
- Luigi Cornaro (November 20, 1551) – Cardinal-Priest of S. Marco; Camerlengo of the Holy Roman Church
- Giovanni Antonio Serbelloni (January 31, 1560) – Cardinal-Priest of S. Angelo in Pescheria; Bishop of Novara
- Carlo Borromeo (January 31, 1560) – Cardinal-Priest of S. Prassede; Archbishop of Milan; Grand penitentiary; Archpriest of the patriarchal Liberian Basilica; Cardinal-protector of Switzerland, Low Countries and Portugal; Cardinal-protector of the Orders of the Knights Hospitaller, Franciscans, Carmelites and Barnabites
- Mark Sittich von Hohenems Altemps (February 26, 1561) – Cardinal-Priest of S. Giorgio in Velabro; Bishop of Constance; Archpriest of the patriarchal Lateran Basilica; Governor of Capranica
- Alfonso Gesualdo (February 26, 1561) – Cardinal-Priest of S. Cecilia; Archbishop of Conza
- Giovanni Francesco Gambara (February 26, 1561) – Cardinal-Priest of S. Prisca; Bishop of Viterbo
- Stanisław Hozjusz (February 26, 1561) – Cardinal-Priest of S. Clemente; Ambassador of Poland before the Holy See; Bishop of Warmia
- Antoine Perrenot de Granvelle (February 26, 1561) – Cardinal-Priest of S. Pietro in Vincoli; Viceroy of the Kingdom of Naples; Archbishop of Mechelen
- Ludovico Madruzzo (February 26, 1561) – Cardinal-Priest of S. Onofrio; Bishop of Trent
- Innico d'Avalos d'Aragona, O.S.Iacobis. (February 26, 1561) – Cardinal-Priest of S. Lorenzo in Lucina; Bishop of Mileto
- Francisco Pacheco de Toledo (February 26, 1561) – Cardinal-Priest of S. Croce in Gerusalemme; Bishop of Burgos; Cardinal-protector of Spain
- Girolamo di Corregio (February 26, 1561) – Cardinal-Priest of S. Anastasia; Archbishop of Taranto
- Marco Antonio Colonna (March 12, 1565) – Cardinal-Priest of SS. XII Apostoli; Archbishop of Salerno
- Tolomeo Gallio (March 12, 1565) – Cardinal-Priest of S. Agata in Suburra; Archbishop of Manfredonia
- Prospero Pubblicola Santacroce (March 12, 1565) – Cardinal-Priest of S. Maria degli Angeli; Bishop of Kissamos; Administrator of Arles
- Marcantonio Bobba (March 12, 1565) – Cardinal-Priest of S. Silvestro in Capite; Bishop of Aosta
- Ugo Buoncompagni (March 12, 1565) – Cardinal-Priest of S. Sisto; Prefect of the Signature of Apostolic Briefs
- Alessandro Sforza (March 12, 1565) – Cardinal-Priest of S. Maria in Via; Bishop of Parma; Legate in Bologna and Romagna
- Flavio Orsini (March 12, 1565) – Cardinal-Priest of S. Marcellino e Pietro; Bishop of Spoleto; Administrator of Cosenza
- Francesco Alciati (March 12, 1565) – Cardinal-Priest of S. Maria in Portico; Prefect of the S.C. of the Tridentine Council; Bishop of Città; Cardinal-protector of Spain and Ireland; Cardinal-protector of the Order of Carthusians
- Alessandro Crivelli (March 12, 1565) – Cardinal-Priest of S. Maria in Aracoeli
- Benedetto Lomellini (March 12, 1565) – Cardinal-Priest of S. Sabina; Bishop of Anagni; Legate in Campagna e Marittima
- Guglielmo Sirleto (March 12, 1565) – Cardinal-Priest of S. Lorenzo in Panisperna; Bishop of Squillace; Librarian of the Holy Roman Church
- Gabriele Paleotti (March 12, 1565) – Cardinal-Priest of SS. Giovanni e Paolo; Archbishop of Bologna
- Michele Bonelli, O.P. (March 6, 1566) – Cardinal-Priest of S. Maria sopra Minerva; Superintendent general of the Papal States; Cardinal-protector of the Order of Dominicans and of the Kingdom of Hungary
- Gianpaolo Della Chiesa (March 24, 1568) – Cardinal-Priest of S. Pancrazio; Prefect of the Tribunal of the Apostolic Signature of Justice
- Marcantonio Maffei (May 17, 1570) – Cardinal-Priest of S. Callisto
- Pier Donato Cesi (May 17, 1570) – Cardinal-Priest of S. Vitale
- Charles d'Angennes de Rambouillet (May 17, 1570) – Cardinal-Priest of S. Eufemia; Ambassador of France before the Holy See; Bishop of Le Mans
- Felice Peretti Montalto, O.F.M.Conv. (May 17, 1570) – Cardinal-Priest of S. Girolamo degli Schiavoni; Bishop of Fermo
- Giovanni Aldobrandini (May 17, 1570) – Cardinal-Priest of S. Simeone; Bishop of Imola
- Girolamo Rusticucci (May 17, 1570) – Cardinal-Priest of S. Susanna; Cardinal Secretary of State; Bishop of Senigallia
- Archangelo de' Bianchi, O.P. (May 17, 1570) – Cardinal-Priest of S. Cesareo in Palatio; Bishop of Teano
- Paolo Burali d'Arezzo, C.R.Theat. (May 17, 1570) – Cardinal-Priest of S. Pudenziana; Bishop of Piacenza
- Vincenzo Giustiniani, O.P. (May 17, 1570) – Cardinal-Priest of S. Nicolo fra le Immagini
- Gian Girolamo Albani (May 17, 1570) – Cardinal-Priest of SS. Giovanni a Porta Latina
- Girolamo Simoncelli (December 22, 1553) – Cardinal-Deacon of SS. Cosma e Damiano; Administrator of Orvieto
- Ludovico d'Este (February 26, 1561) – Cardinal-Deacon of S. Lucia in Silice; Administrator of Auch and Ferrara
- Ferdinando de' Medici (January 6, 1563) – Cardinal-Deacon of S. Maria in Domnica; Legate in Perugia
- Guido Luca Ferrero (March 12, 1565) – Cardinal-Deacon of SS. Vito e Modesto; Bishop of Vercelli
- Antonio Carafa (March 24, 1568) – Cardinal-Deacon of S. Eusebio; Prefect of the Tribunal of the Apostolic Signature of Grace; Cardinal-protector of Maronites
- Giulio Acquaviva d'Aragona (May 17, 1570) – Cardinal-Deacon of S. Teodoro

Twenty-six electors were created by Pius IV, fourteen by Pius V, eight by Pope Paul III, four by Julius III and one by Pope Paul IV.

== Absentees ==
Thirteen Cardinals were absent:

- Georges d'Armagnac (December 19, 1544) – Cardinal-Priest of S. Nicola in Carcere Tulliano; Administrator of Toulouse; Co-Legate in Avignon; Royal Governor of Languedoc
- Henry of Portugal (December 16, 1545) – Cardinal-Priest of SS. IV Coronati; Inquisitor General of the Portuguese Inquisition; Legate a latere in Portugal; Regent of the Kingdom of Portugal
- Charles de Lorraine-Guise (July 27, 1547) – Cardinal-Priest of S. Apollinare; Archbishop of Reims
- Charles I de Bourbon-Vendôme (January 8, 1548) – Cardinal-Priest of S. Crisogono; Archbishop of Rouen; Administrator of Beauvais; Legate in Avignon
- Louis de Lorraine de Guise (December 22, 1553) – Cardinal-Priest of S. Tommaso in Parione; Bishop of Metz
- Zaccaria Delfino (March 12, 1565) – Cardinal-Priest of S. Maria in Aquiro; Bishop of Hvar
- Diego de Espinosa (March 24, 1568) – Cardinal-Priest of S. Stefano al Monte Celio; Bishop of Sigüenza; Grand Inquisitor of Spain
- Gaspar Cervantes de Gaeta (May 17, 1570) – Cardinal-Priest of S. Balbina; Archbishop of Tarragona
- Giulio Antonio Santorio (May 17, 1570) – Cardinal-Priest of S. Bartolomeo all'Isola; Archbishop of Santa Severina
- Nicolas de Pellevé (May 17, 1570) – Cardinal-Priest of [no title assigned]; Archbishop of Sens
- Innocenzo del Monte (May 30, 1550) – Cardinal-Deacon of S. Maria in Via Lata; Protodeacon of the Sacred College of Cardinals
- Antoine de Créquy Canaples (March 12, 1565) – Cardinal-Deacon of S. Trifonio; Bishop of Amiens
- Giovanni Francesco Commendone (March 12, 1565) – Cardinal-Deacon of S. Ciriaco alle Terme

Four were created by Paul III, another four by Pius V, three by Pius IV, and two by Julius III.

== Divisions among Cardinals ==
The College of Cardinals was divided into several factions. Most of the creatures of Pius IV followed the leadership of his nephews Carlo Borromeo and Marcus Sitticus von Hohenems. Michele Bonelli, grand-nephew of Pius V, was a leader of cardinals elevated by this pontiff. Alessandro Farnese was still very influential and had adherents not only among the creatures of his grandfather Paul III. The interests of Grand Duchy of Tuscany were under the care of Cardinal Alessandro de' Medici, son of Grand Duke Cosimo I de Medici, while those of Philip II of Spain were represented by Pacheco and Granvelle. Cardinal Rambouillet was the main representative of Charles IX of France in the conclave.

== Candidates to the Papacy ==
Cardinals Farnese, Savelli, Correggio, Ricci, and Boncompagni were considered as the main papabili. Farnese was the most active in promoting his own candidature, but he also met with the strongest opposition. His main opponent was Cardinal Medici because of the rivalry between the House of Medici (Grand Duchy of Tuscany) and the House of Farnese (Duchy of Parma) in Northern Italy. Also, king Philip II of Spain opposed Farnese's candidature because he considered his elevation dangerous to the balance of power in Italy. The worldly Farnese was also unacceptable to the austere Carlo Borromeo. It was generally expected that the conclave would last very long, possibly even several months.

== The conclave ==
Fifty-two Cardinals entered the conclave on May 12. On that same day in the evening, they were joined by one more, Granvelle, Viceroy of Naples and official representative of Philip II of Spain. The first step taken by Granvelle was to inform Alessandro Farnese that the King of Spain would not accept his election and to ask him to withdraw his candidature in order to maintain peace in Italy. Surprised, Farnese understood that with such strong opposition, he would never obtain the required majority, but, admitting his defeat, he wished to be able to use his influence effectively in the choice of the new pontiff. Almost the whole next day leaders of the main factions: Farnese, Bonelli, Granvelle and Borromeo, spent looking for a compromise candidate and finally agreed to elect the 70-year-old Ugo Boncompagni. The first scrutiny took place on May 13 at six o'clock in the evening. At the end of the phase of accessus Ugo Boncompagni was elected Pope, receiving all votes except of his own, which he gave to Granvelle. He accepted his election and took the name of Gregory XIII, in honour of Pope Gregory I.

The people of Rome were surprised by such a quick election, but they welcomed the new pope because he was neither religious nor an austere "Theatine," as most people had feared. On May 25 Gregory XIII was solemnly crowned by Cardinal Protodeacon Innocenzo del Monte.

== Sources ==
- Vatican History: an account of the papal conclave, 1572 in German
- List of participants of the papal conclave, 1572 by S. Miranda
- Ludwig von Pastor, History of the Popes vol. XIX, London 1930
