= Cardinals created by Pius V =

Catholic appointments from 1566 to 1570

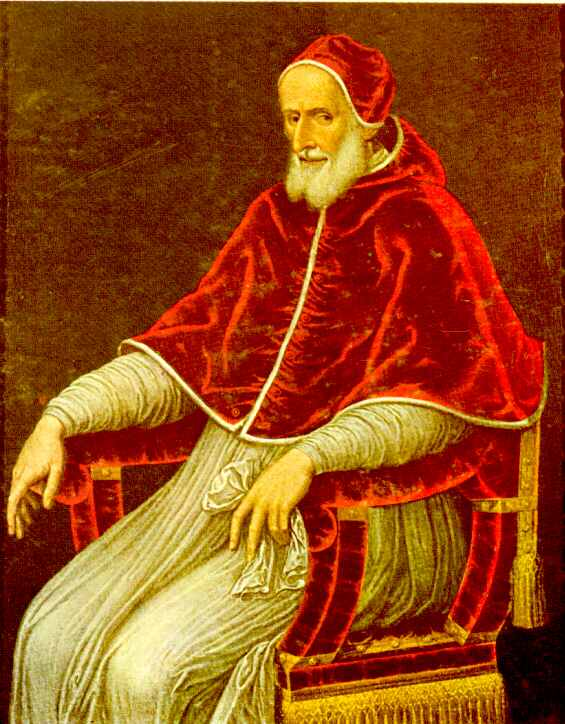
Pope Pius V (1504–72).

Pope Pius V (r. 1566–1572) created 21 cardinals in three consistories.

== 6 March 1566 ==
1. Michele Bonelli

== 24 March 1568 ==
1. Diego de Espinosa
2. Jérôme Souchier
3. Gianpaolo Della Chiesa
4. Antonio Carafa

== 17 May 1570 ==
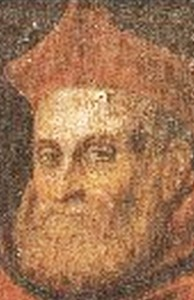
Paolo Burali d'Arezzo (1511–78), made a cardinal on May 17, 1570.

1. Marcantonio Maffei
2. Gaspar Cervantes de Gaeta
3. Giulio Antonio Santorio
4. Pier Donato Cesi
5. Carlo Grassi
6. Charles d'Angennes de Rambouillet
7. Felice Peretti di Montalto (future Pope Sixtus V, from 1585 to 1590.)
8. Giovanni Aldobrandini
9. Girolamo Rusticucci
10. Giulio Acquaviva d'Aragona
11. Gaspar de Zúñiga y Avellaneda
12. Nicolas de Pellevé
13. Archangelo de' Bianchi
14. Paolo Burali d'Arezzo
15. Vincenzo Giustiniani
16. Gian Girolamo Albani
