= Benedetto Lomellini =

Italian cardinal and bishop

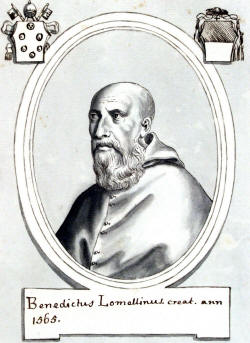
Benedetto Lomellini

Benedetto Lomellini (1517 – 24 July 1579) was an Italian Roman Catholic cardinal and bishop.

== Biography ==
Benedetto Lomellini was born in Genoa in 1517, the son of a rich noble family. He received a doctorate in law.

He practiced as a lawyer and became a cleric in Genoa. He later moved to Rome, becoming a Referendary of the Apostolic Signatura. On 27 September 1543, he became an abbreviator de parco maiori. He was made a secretary apostolic on 1 December 1551. The pope also made him a domestic prelate. On 27 July 1562, he became a member of the Apostolic Camera. He was made praefectus annonae on 13 November 1562. He accompanied Cardinal Carlo Carafa during his legation to Philip II of Spain.

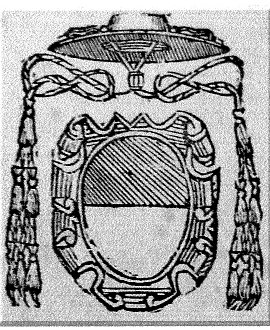
Coat of arms of Cardinal Benedetto Lomellini

Pope Pius IV made him a cardinal deacon in the consistory of 12 March 1565. He received the red hat and the deaconry of Santa Maria in Aquiro on 15 May 1565.

On 6 July 1565, he was elected Bishop of Ventimiglia. He was transferred to the see of Luni-Sarzana on 7 September 1565. On the same day, he opted for the titular church of Santa Sabina. He was consecrated as a bishop by Cardinal Clemente d'Olera in San Pietro in Montorio on 21 November 1565.

He participated in the papal conclave of 1565-66 that elected Pope Pius V. The new pope named him papal legate in the Campagne and Maritime Province in 1571. On 17 March 1572, he was transferred to the see of Anagni. He participated in the papal conclave of 1572 that elected Pope Gregory XIII.

He died in Rome on 24 July 1579. He was buried in San Gregorio Magno al Celio.

Catholic Church titles
Preceded by Ippolito II d'Este	Cardinal-Deacon of Santa Maria in Aquiro; 1565	Succeeded by Zaccaria Delfino
Preceded by Carlo Visconti (cardinal)	Bishop of Ventimiglia; 1565	Succeeded by Carlo Grimaldi
Preceded by Simone Pasqua	Bishop of Luni e Sarzana; 1565–1572	Succeeded by Giovanni Battista Bracelli
Preceded by Stanislaw Hosius	Cardinal-Deacon of Santa Sabina; 1565–1579	Succeeded by Vincenzo Giustiniani
Preceded by Miguel Torcella	Bishop of Anagni; 1572–1579	Succeeded by Gaspare Viviani
