= Gianbernardino Scotti =

Italian cardinal

His Eminence Bernardino Scotti
- Cardinal, Bishop of Piacenza
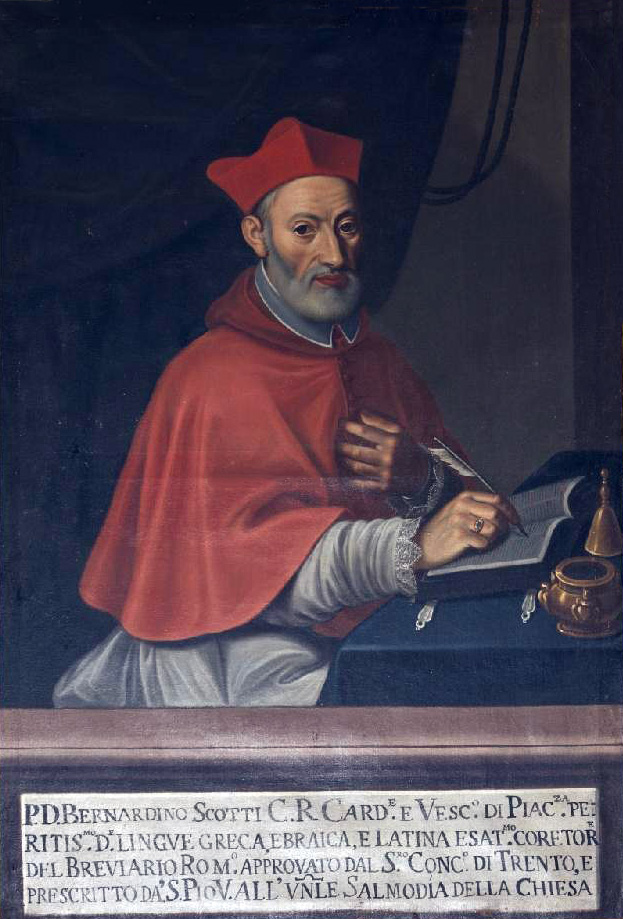
- Church: Catholic Church
- See: Piacenza
- Appointed: 9 August 1559
- Term ended: 23 July 1568
- Predecessor: Catalano Trivulzio
- Successor: Paolo Burali d'Arezzo
- Other post: Cardinal Priest of San Matteo in Merulana

Orders
- Consecration: 25 April 1560 (Bishop) by Cardinal Jean Suau
- Created cardinal: 20 December 1555 by Pope Paul IV

Personal details
- Born: c. 1493 Magliano Sabina
- Died: 2 December 1568 (aged 74–75) Rome
- Buried: San Paolo fuori le Mura

Bernardino Scotti (or Gianbernardino, c. 1493 – 1568) was an Italian cardinal. Near the stern positions of Pope Paul IV, he was an exponent of the Catholic Reformation. After the death of Pope Paul IV, he moved to his diocese of Piacenza, where he repressed any Protestant dissent.

== Biography ==
Gianbernardino Scotti was born in Magliano Sabina ca. 1493; he was a member of the aristocratic Scotti Family of Piacenza. He was an expert in Greek, Hebrew, and in canon law. He entered the order of the Theatines in 1525, and is believed to be the first man to receive the Theatine habit. Escaped from Rome after the Sack of Rome, in 1527, along with other Theatines, he moved to Venice where they lived in the church of Tolentini.

In 1536, Scotti returned to Rome, where he represented his religious order in many affairs. He also worked to merge the Theatines with the Somaschi Fathers, a merger that lasted only about ten years. In 1548, he accompanied Luigi Lippomano, Bishop of Verona during the bishop's nunciature in Germany. Returning from Germany, he moved to Venice, where he was appointed Prior of the Theatine house at Tolentini's church.

In 1555, Pope Paul IV, one of the founders of the Theatine Order, summoned Scotti to Rome, making him Archbishop of Trani and cardinal priest in the consistory of 20 December 1555. He received the red hat and the titular church of San Matteo in Via Merulana on 13 January 1556. However, he never took possession of his diocese of Trani because the Habsburgs never endorsed his appointment.

In Rome, under Paul IV, he cooperated in the preparation of the Index Librorum Prohibitorum and in drafting the new Breviary. He worked for the Roman Inquisition, in the posthumous process against Girolamo Savonarola and in 1558 in the first process against Cardinal Giovanni Morone. The Pope assigned to him the revenues of the Abbey of Eboli previously assigned to Cardinal Morone. On 9 August 1559 he was transferred to the see of Piacenza.

He participated in the papal conclave of 1559 that elected Pope Pius IV. The new Pope started a purge against the people who had been near to the previous Pope, such as Cardinal Carlo Carafa. Scotti therefore decided to move from Rome to his new diocese, after having been consecrated bishop on 25 April 1560 by Cardinal Jean Suau.

In Piacenza, he repressed any Protestant dissent. Marginalised, he tried to remain independent of the political influence of Charles Borromeo. He returned to Rome only after the papal conclave of 1565-66 that elected Pope Pius V. The new pope made him a member of the Roman Inquisition and placed him in charge of the affairs of the Eastern Catholic Churches. He resigned the government of Piacenza sometime before 23 July 1568 to another Theatine, Paolo Burali d'Arezzo.

He died in Rome on 2 December 1568. He was buried in the Basilica of San Paolo fuori le Mura.
