= 1559 conclave =

Election of Catholic Pope Pius IV

Papal conclave September–December 1559

Dates and location
- 5 September – 25 December 1559; Cappella Paolina, Apostolic Palace, Papal States

Key officials
- Dean: Jean du Bellay
- Sub-dean: François de Tournon
- Camerlengo: Guido Ascanio Sforza
- Protopriest: Robert de Lenoncourt
- Protodeacon: Alessandro Farnese

Elected pope
- Giovanni Medici; Name taken: Pius IV
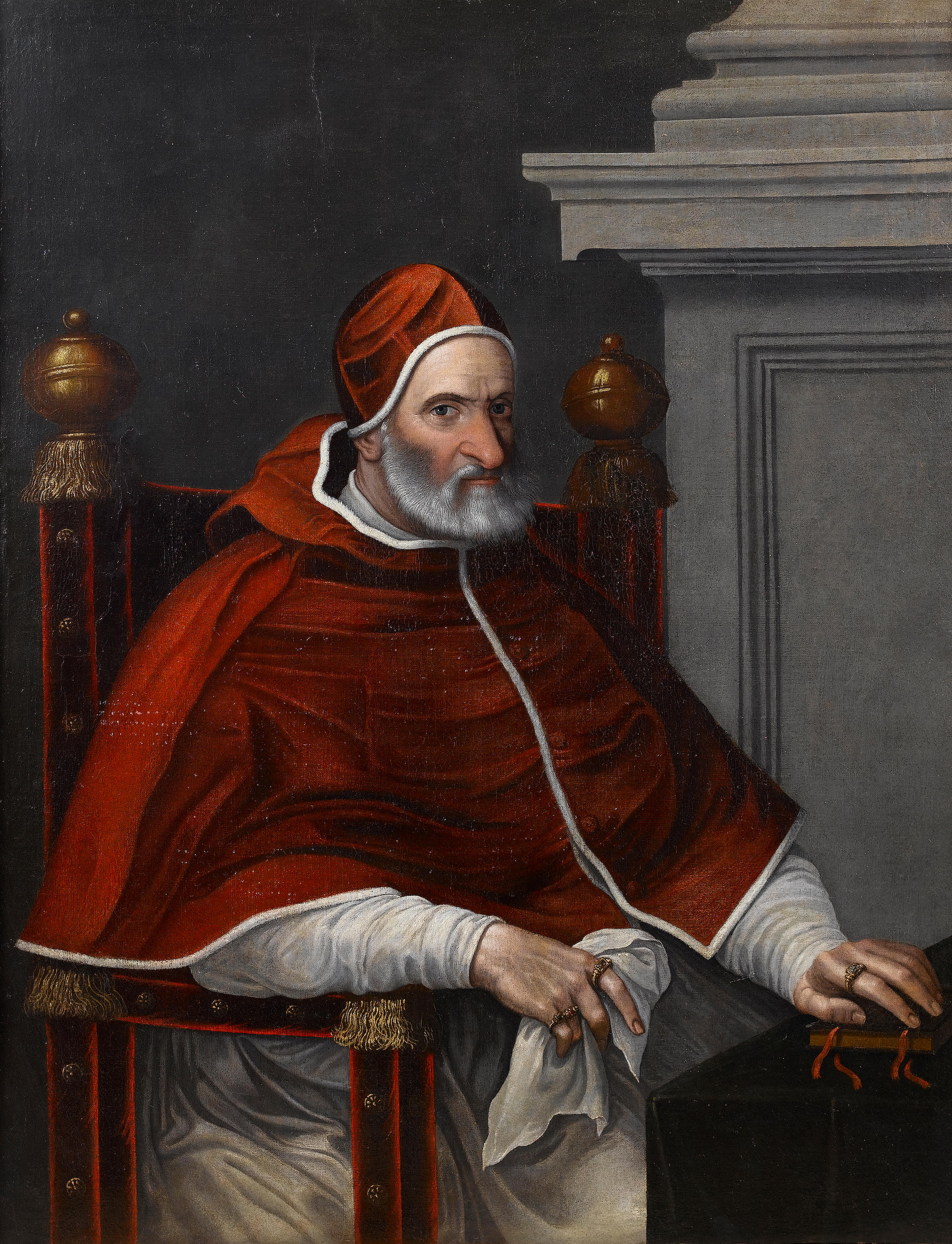

The 1559 papal conclave (5 September – 25 December) was convened on the death of Pope Paul IV and elected Pope Pius IV as his successor. Due to interference from secular rulers and the cardinals' disregard for their supposed isolation from the outside world, it was the longest conclave of the 16th century.

== Death and preparations ==
Pope Paul IV died on 18 August 1559, aged 83. His church reforms had mainly been based on repressive measures such as the Inquisition and the Index of Forbidden Books – he had no confidence in the Council of Trent, dissolving it in 1552 and not reviving it.

Even cardinals were accused of heresy – at the time of Paul IV's death, Cardinal Morone was a prisoner of the Inquisition in the castel Sant' Angelo. Paul IV, fearing that Morone might become his successor, issued the papal bull Cum ex officio Apostolatus, which stipulated that a heretic could not be validly elected pope – however, this was in vain since the College of Cardinals released Morone after Paul's death and allowed him to take part in the conclave. The bull also covered Cardinal d'Este, who Paul complained was trying to become pope by simony.

Paul IV's reforms did not abolish nepotism, however – 3 of the cardinals at the conclave were Paul's nephews, the most influential being Carlo Carafa and the other two being Diomede Carafa and Alfonso Carafa. On the model of pope Alexander VI (one of the Borgia popes, who had died on the same date as Paul 56 years earlier), Paul had tried to build up his family's power in Italy, mainly at the expense of the Colonna family, whose many lands (including the imperial Palia fiefdom) were seized and handed over to the Carafa family. Paul's nephews ruled even more brutally than he and abused their power so much that at one point Paul was forced to step in, stripping Carlo of power early in 1559. Carlo never regained his uncle's favour and after Paul's death he and Paul's other two cardinal-nephews had good reason to fear their enemies would now take revenge.

Paul IV was rigidly orthodox, intolerant, and authoritarian in manner. Spontaneous riots broke out in Rome after his death, with crowds toppling his statue and attacking the Inquisition's headquarters. Thus 3700 troops were brought in to keep order, including 300 cavalry.

== Cardinals in 1559 ==
=== Participants ===
At the time of the conclave there were 55 cardinals, 47 of whom participated in it. Of those 47, one died during the conclave (Capodiferro) and two had to leave early due to illness:

- Jean du Bellay (made a cardinal on 21 May 1535) – cardinal-bishop of Ostia e Velletri; dean of the College of Cardinals; administrator of the archdiocese of Bordeaux (left the conclave on 13 December due to illness )
- François de Tournon (9 March 1530) – cardinal-bishop of Sabina; sub-dean of the College of cardinals; archbishop of Lyon and primate of Gaul; general of the order of canons regular
- Rodolfo Pio di Carpi (22 December 1536) – cardinal-bishop of Porto e Santa Rufina; administrator of the diocese of Girgenti
- Francesco Pisani (1 July 1517) – cardinal-bishop of Frascati; cardinal priest of San Marco; administrator of the archdiocese of Narbonne
- Federico Cesi (19 December 1544) – cardinal-bishop of Palestrina; administrator of the diocese of Cremona
- Pedro Pacheco de Villena (16 December 1545) – cardinal-bishop of Albano; bishop of Sigüenza
- Robert de Lenoncourt (20 December 1538) – cardinal-priest of S. Cecilia; protopriest of the College of Cardinals; archbishop of Embrun; administrator of the diocese of Auxerre
- Ercole Gonzaga (3 May 1527) – cardinal-priest of S. Maria Nuova; bishop of Mantua; protector of the Spanish
- Niccolò Caetani (22 December 1536) – cardinal-priest of S. Eustachio; archbishop of Capua; administrator of the diocese of Quimper
- Giovanni Girolamo Morone (2 June 1542) – cardinal-priest of S. Maria in Trastevere; bishop of Novara; protector of the Austrians
- Cristoforo Madruzzo (2 June 1542) – cardinal-priest of S. Cesareo in Palatio; bishop of Trent and Brixen
- Bartolomé de la Cueva (19 December 1544) – cardinal-priest of S. Croce in Gerusalemme
- Georges d'Armagnac (19 December 1544) – cardinal-priest of S. Lorenzo in Lucina; bishop of Rodez
- Otto Truchess von Waldburg (19 December 1544) – cardinal-priest of S. Sabina; bishop of Augsburg; protector of the Holy Roman Empire
- Tiberio Crispi (19 December 1544) – cardinal-priest of S. Agata alla Suburra; administrator of the archdiocese of Amalfi; camerlengo of the College of Cardinals
- Giovanni Angelo Medici (8 April 1549) – cardinal-priest of S. Prisca
- Cristoforo Ciocchi del Monte (20 November 1551) – cardinal-priest of S. Prassede; bishop of Cagli
- Fulvio della Corgna, O.S.Io.Hieros. (20 November 1551) – cardinal-priest of S. Stefano al Monte Celio
- Giovanni Michele Saraceni (20 November 1551) – cardinal-priest of S. Anastasia; archbishop of Acerenza and Matera (19 December left the conclave due to illness)
- Giovanni Ricci (20 November 1551) – cardinal-priest of S. Vitale, Gervasio e Protasio
- Giovanni Andrea Mercurio (20 November 1551) – cardinal-priest of S. Ciriaco alla Terme; archbishop of Messina
- Giacomo Puteo (20 November 1551) – cardinal-priest of S. Maria in Via; archbishop of Bari; protector of the Johannites
- Giovanni Battista Cicala (20 November 1551) – cardinal-priest of S. Clemente; administrator of the diocese of Mariana
- Gianbernardino Scotti, Theat. (20 December 1555) – cardinal-priest of S. Matteo in Merulana; archbishop of Trani
- Diomede Carafa (20 December 1555) – cardinal-priest of S. Martino ai Monti; bishop of Ariano
- Scipione Rebiba (20 December 1555) – cardinal-priest of S. Pudenziana; archbishop of Pisa
- Jean Suau (20 December 1555) – cardinal-priest of S. Giovanni a Porta Latina; bishop of Mirepoix
- Giovanni Antonio Capizzuchi (20 December 1555) – cardinal-priest of S. Pancrazio; bishop of Lodi
- Taddeo Gaddi (15 March 1557) – cardinal-priest of S. Silvestro in Capite; archbishop of Cosenza
- Lorenzo Strozzi (15 March 1557) – cardinal-priest of S. Balbina; bishop of Béziers
- Jean de Bertrand (15 March 1557) – cardinal-priest of SS. Nereo ed Achilleo; administrator of the archdiocese of Sens
- Antonio Michele Ghislieri, O.P. (15 March 1557) – cardinal-priest of S. Maria sopra Minerva; Grand Inquisitor of the Holy Congregation of the Roman and Universal Inquisition; bishop of Sutri and Nepi
- Clemente d'Olera, O.F.M.Obs. (15 March 1557) – cardinal-priest of S. Maria in Aracoeli; archpriest of Rapallo
- Alessandro Farnese (18 December 1534) – cardinal-deacon of S. Lorenzo in Damaso; protodeacon of the College of Cardinals; Vice-Chancellor of the Holy Roman Church; legate in Avignon; archpriest of the Lateran Basilica; administrator of the diocese of Spoleto; protector of the Poles
- Guido Ascanio Sforza (18 December 1534) – cardinal-deacon of S. Maria in Via Lata; camerlengo of the Holy Roman Church; archpriest of the Lateran Basilica; administrator of the diocese of Parma; protector of the Portuguese
- Ippolito II d'Este (20 December 1538) – cardinal-deacon of S. Maria in Aquiro; administrator of the archdiocese of Auch; gubernator of Tivoli; protector of the French
- Giacomo Savelli (19 December 1539) – cardinal-deacon of S. Maria in Cosmedin; administrator of the diocese of Nicastro
- Girolamo Capodiferro (19 December 1544) – cardinal-deacon of S. Giorgio in Velabro; bishop of Saint-Jean-de-Maurienne (died 1 December)
- Ranuccio Farnese (16 December 1545) – cardinal-deacon of S. Angela in Pescheria; Grand Penitentiary; archpriest of the Lateran Basilica; administrator of the archdiocese of Ravenna
- Giulio Feltre della Rovere (27 July 1547) – cardinal-deacon of S. Pietro in Vincoli
- Innocenzo del Monte (30 May 1550) – cardinal-deacon of S. Onofrio
- Luigi Cornaro (20 November 1551) – cardinal-deacon of S. Teodoro
- Louis I de Guise (22 December 1553) – cardinal-deacon of S. Tommaso in Parione; administrator of the diocese of Albi
- Girolamo Simoncelli (22 December 1553) – cardinal-deacon of SS. Cosma e Damiano; bishop of Orvieto
- Carlo Carafa (7 June 1555) – cardinal-deacon of SS. Vito e Modesto; regent of the Apostolic Chancellery; administrator of the diocese of Comminges; gubernator of Ancona, Rimini i Gualdo
- Alfonso Carafa (15 March 1557) – cardinal-deacon of S. Maria in Domnica; librarian of the Holy Roman Church; regent of the Apostolic Chamber; administrator of the archdiocese of Naples
- Vitellozzo Vitelli (15 March 1557) – cardinal-deacon of S. Maria in Portico; bishop of Città di Castello

Of these 47 cardinals, 37 were Italians, 7 French, 2 Spanish and 1 German. 13 had been appointed by Pope Paul IV, 11 by Pope Julius III, 20 Pope Paul III, 2 by Pope Clement VII and 1 by Pope Leo X.

=== Absentees ===
8 cardinals (5 French, 1 Spanish, 1 Portuguese and 1 Italian) did not come to the conclave. 2 of these 8 died during its sitting:

- Claude de Longwy de Givry (7 November 1533, by Clement VII) – Cardinal-Priest of Sant'Agnese in Agone, administrator of the diocese of Langres
- Odet de Coligny de Châtillon (7 November 1533, by Clement VII) – Cardinal-Deacon of Sant' Adriano, administrator of the diocese of Beauvais
- Sanguin Antoine de Meudon (19 December 1539, by Pope Paul III) – Cardinal-Priest of San Crisogono, administrator of the Archdiocese of Toulouse (died 25 November)
- Francisco Mendoza de Bobadilla (19 December 1544, by Paul III) – Cardinal-Priest of San Eusebio, bishop of Burgos
- Henry of Portugal (16 December 1545, by Paul III) – Cardinal-Priest of Santi Quattro Coronati, Archbishop of Evora, inquisitor general of the Portuguese Inquisition, papal legate in Portugal
- Charles I of Lorraine-Guise (27 July 1547, by Paul III) – Cardinal-Priest of Sant' Apollinare, Archbishop of Reims
- Charles II de Bourbon-Vendôme (8 January 1548, by Paul III) – Cardinal-Deacon of Santo Sisto, Archbishop of Rouen
- Girolamo Dandini (20 November 1551, by Julius III) – Cardinal-Priest of Santo Marcello (died 4 December)

== Factions and candidates ==
The College of Cardinals was divided into three factions: a Spanish one (17 Cardinals headed by cardinals Sforza and Madruzzo), a French one (16 cardinals headed by Ippolito d'Este and de Guise) and an "Italian" one (14 cardinals headed by Carlo Carafa and Alessandro Farnese). A few cardinals remained neutral. The Spanish ambassador, Don Francisco de Vargas Mejía, regularly slipped into the conclave to counsel the Spanish group.

The French candidates for pope were d'Este, Gonzaga and Tournon. The King of France favoured Cardinal Carpi. Philip II of Spain preferred cardinals Carpi, Morone, Puteo, Medici and D'Oler – in short, any candidate other than d'Este or a Frenchman. Cosimo I, Duke of Florence, favored, although no relation, Cardinal Giovanni Angelo de' Medici, younger brother of Gian Giacomo Medici, an Imperial general in Germany and Siena. In total there were over 20 candidates.

For Carlo Carafa, choosing the new pope was literally a matter of life and death and so he mainly used the conclave to obtain guarantees that he and his relatives would not be punished for their abuses. He had one serious advantage – the Italian cardinals nominated by his uncle Paul remained loyal to him. He favoured Carpi and Gonzaga for pope. Although his uncle was an enemy of the Spanish, and encouraged France, Carlo decided to ally himself with the Spanish party.

== Course ==
The papacy was under criticism for failing to address abuses, and the college of cardinals was split between moderates and conservatives, as well as along national lines.

The conclave began on 5 September 1559, with 40 cardinals present. Exploiting the fact that the French cardinals had not yet arrived in Rome, the Spanish faction tried to get Carpi elected by acclamation, but this attempt failed because Sforza (one of the factions leaders) opposed Carpi's election and secretly agreed with d'Este that he should lose.

In this situation, the normal procedures were implemented. On 8 September electors signed the electoral capitulation, requiring the pope who was elected to continue reform of the church and the curia and to resume the deliberations of the council of Trent and promote peace between Christian princes. By the end of September seven more cardinals had arrived in Rome.

For a few weeks voting took place routinely, without any result. Most votes went to minor candidates. The Spanish Pacheco and Cueva were regularly given twelve to twenty votes; on 13 September the Frenchman Leonocourt received 18 votes; on 18 September the absent Cardinal Henry of Portugal was given 15 votes and 5; others voted for at this point included Rebiba, Ghisleri and Saraceni. Rannucio Farnese got 21 votes in the election on the anniversary of his grandfather's election as pope. From 9 September to 16 December 68 fruitless ballots were held.

The front-runners were still trying for office. However, on 18 September, with the support of Cardinal Farnese, cardinal Carpi put himself up as a candidate again. Over the next few rounds he received 11–16 votes. On 22 September the French tried to get cardinal Tournon selected, but his chances were dashed by Carafa's opposition, who supported the Spaniard Pacheco. In the voting that took place that day, Tournon received a total of 20 votes (including 5 by accession) and Pacheco 19 (including 1 by accession).

A few days later, the French agreed with Sforza, leader of the Spanish faction, to support cardinal Gonzaga and push through his election by acclamation. This plan ended in a fiasco, with Gonzadze, Carafa and part of the Spanish faction objecting to it.

On 25 September Philip II's ambassador Vargas arrived in Rome and under his auspices Sforza, Farnese and Carafa met on 2 October. The ambassador suggested Puteo as a candidate instead of Carpi and Pacheco. Farnese and Carafa refused, however, and the meeting was unsuccessful. Around this time Sforza began to fight on two fronts – promising the French faction to keep agitating in favour of Gonzaga and the Italian party that he would do so in favour of Pacheco and Carpi.

At the end of September and start of October, there was extensive exchange of correspondence between the pro-Spanish cardinals and Philip II. Francis II of France and Ferdinand I, Holy Roman Emperor also sent letters to cardinals recommending Gonzaga's candidacy. This breach of the canonical rule that the conclave be held in secret and without any influence from secular leaders outraged the people of Rome into protest, but du Bellay (dean of the College of Cardinals) rejected the objections.

In the second half of October Carafa broke his alliance with Sforza, as Philip II decided to return the fiefdom Palli Colonnie Marcantonio and ordered the Spanish cardinals to prevent the selection of Gonzaga at all costs. Cardinal d'Este allied himself with Carafa, hoping to win the election, but the vote on 1 December showed this was in vain, with many who had promised to vote for him not doing so. The French also – without much success – tried to get cardinals Tournon and Suau elected.

In the first days of December, in agreement with the French, Carafa again proposed Gonzaga, intending to gain his election by acclamation. However, in the meantime, Carafa received a letter removing the expected guarantees from Philip and he and the French returned to their alliance with the Spanish party. He then committed himself in writing to cardinal Sforza that he would not endorse any candidate opposed by Philip II. As a result, this session, which selected cardinal Gonzaga, nearly ended in cardinal Carpi being chosen by acclamation. The protracted conclave led to increasing concern on the streets of Rome, especially since the camerlengo was forced to reduce troop numbers due to financial problems.

After the overthrow of the French-backed Gonzaga, Pisani was suggested as a "transitional pope", but to no avail. Their party in early December waned in numbers – on 1 December cardinal Capodiferro died, while on 13 December du Bellay had to leave the conclave due to illness, handing over his duties as dean of the college to cardinal Tournon. Six days later, Saraceni also left the conclave. The French had lost the ability to block the opposing party's candidates, so the Spaniards tried to push through the election of cardinal Pacheco. In the vote on 18 December the Spanish only missed the necessary majority by three votes.

The Christmas festival was imminent and this led the factions' leaders to make peace and conclude a compromise. At a meeting on 22 December leaders of all three parties met to decide upon a candidate acceptable to all sides. The French suggested cardinal Cesi, the Spaniards suggested cardinal Medici, but Carafa remained undecided. The French were eventually persuaded to back cardinal Medici, who was also strongly supported by the Duke of Florence and Vice-Chancellor Alessandro Farnese. Carafa also finally supported Medici, who promised him an amnesty.

== Election ==
On the evening of 24 December, 44 cardinals gathered in the Sistine Chapel and elected Giovanni Angelo Medici as pope by acclamation, ending the longest conclave of the 16th century. The cardinals asked Medici, however, whether he would consent to a scrutiny on the next day. He replied that he would, if they stipulated that the election by acclamation on 24 December was valid and canonical. The next morning, on 25 December, a Scrutiny was held and forty-four ballots were cast; two cardinals were absent, Saraceni and du Bellay. Medici received every vote except his own. He cast his votes for: François de Tournon, Rodolfo Pio di Carpi, Pedro Pacheco de Villena, Ercole Gonzaga, and Ippolito d'Este. This is another clear indication that the preferential ballot was being used in scrutinies, and that an elector could and did vote for more than one person on a ballot. Giovanni de' Medici took the name Pius IV and on the feast of the Epiphany on 6 January 1560 the Cardinal protodeacon Alessandro Farnese crowned him with the papal tiara.

Within a week of his election Pius promulgated new regulations governing the secrecy of the conclave, to address some of the outside influence on the conclave.

The choice of Pius IV was a reaction to the brutal rule of Paul IV and his nephews. Pius had nothing to do with his predecessor's pride and arrogance and he resumed and completed the Council of Trent. Although he had fathered three children before his consecration as pope, he kept them in obscurity and out of church governance, unlike Pope Paul III and Pope Alexander VI. His only cardinal-nephew was Charles Borromeo, a future saint – as for Paul IV's nephews, he showed no mercy, arresting Carlo and Alfonso in 1560 (Diomede had died just after the conclave), executing Carlo in 1561 and only pardoning Alfonso after he had spent over a year in prison.

== Sources ==
- L. Pastor, History of the Popes, vol. XV, London 1928.
- Paris, Louis, ed. (1841). Négociations, lettres et pièces diverses relatives au règne de François II: tirées du portefeuille de Sébastien de l'Aubespine (in French). Paris: Imprimerie Royale. pp. 98–105. ISBN 9780598848697.
