= Giovanni Battista Bracelli =

Giovanni Battista Bracelli may refer to:

- Giovanni Battista Bracelli (bishop) (d. 1590), an Italian bishop;
- Giovanni Battista Braccelli (fl. 1616–1649), the name of one or more Italian painters.
