= Francesco Acquaviva =

Italian Cardinal

His Eminence, The Most Reverend Francesco Acquaviva
- Cardinal; Bishop of Sabina
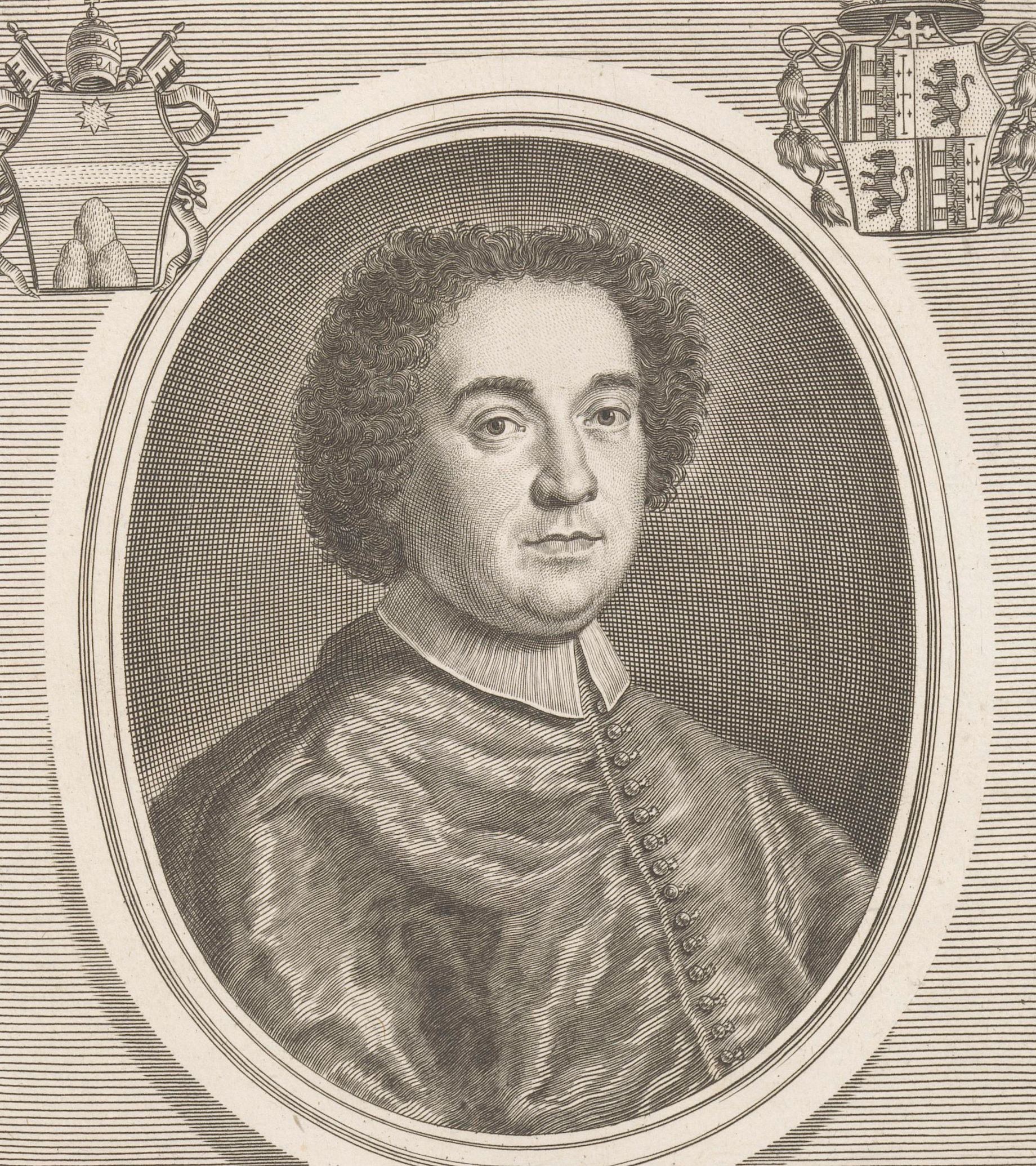
- Church: Roman Catholic Church

Orders
- Consecration: 22 December 1697 by Gasparo Carpegna

Personal details
- Born: 14 October 1665 Naples, Kingdom of Naples, Spanish Empire
- Died: 9 January 1725 (aged 59) Rome, Papal States
- Coat of arms

Francesco Acquaviva d'Aragona (14 October 1665 – 9 January 1725) was an Italian Cardinal, who served as ambassador of Spain to the Holy See.

== Life ==
Francesco Acquaviva was born 14 October 1665 in Naples, the son of Giosia III Acquaviva d'Aragona, 14th Duke of Atri, and Francesca Caracciolo; his elder son, Giovan Girolamo II, was the 15th Duke. He was also the grand-nephew of Cardinal Ottavio Acquaviva d'Aragona (iuniore) (1654); uncle of Cardinal Troiano Acquaviva d’Aragona (1732); grand-uncle of Cardinal Pasquale Acquaviva d'Aragona (1770). Other cardinals of the family were Giovanni Vincenzo Acquaviva d'Aragona (1542); Giulio Acquaviva d'Aragona (1570); and Ottavio Acquaviva d'Aragona (seniore) (1591).

He obtained a doctorate in utroque iure, both canon and civil law from the University of Fermo. He served as Vice-legate in Fermo, and was made a domestic prelate 25 November 1688. The following year, he was appointed Vice-legate in Ferrara. Francesco Acquaviva was consecrated titular archbishop of Larissa 22 December 1697. Francesco Acquaviva filled various offices under Popes Innocent XI, Alexander VIII, Innocent XII, and Clement XI, who created him Cardinal in the consistory of 17 May 1706.

He was nuncio to Spain, from 6 April 1700 until 7 December 1706. In 1708, due to the Austrian conquest of the Kingdom of Naples, he lost a number of ecclesiastical benefices, but was compensated by Philip V with the appointment as diplomatic representative of the Catholic court to the Holy See, as well as cardinal protector of Spain. He was very loyal to Philip V, and sold his silverware to help the king bear the costs of the long war of succession and, in a critical moment, also saved the first wife of that sovereign, Luisa Maria Gabriella of Savoy. He participated in matters such as arranging the marriage of King Philip V and Princess Isabella Farnese of Parma, on 20 August 1714. He resided at the Palazzo di Spagna in Rome.

In 1709, he was named Cardinal-protector of Santa Cecilia in Trastevere. He served as Camerlengo of the Sacred College of Cardinals from 26 January 1711 until 2 March 1712. Francesco Acquaviva participated in the conclave of 1721, which elected Pope Innocent XIII, and the conclave of 1724, which elected Pope Benedict XIII.

He was buried at Rome in the Church of Santa Cecilia.

== Episcopal Lineage ==
- Cardinal Scipione Rebiba
- Cardinal Giulio Antonio Santorio (1566)
- Cardinal Girolamo Bernerio, OP (1586)
- Archbishop Galeazzo Sanvitale (1604)
- Cardinal Ludovico Ludovisi (1621)
- Cardinal Luigi Caetani (1622)
- Cardinal Ulderico Carpegna (1630)
- Cardinal Paluzzo Paluzzi Altieri degli Albertoni (1666)
- Cardinal Gaspare Carpegna (1670)
- Cardinal Francesco Acquaviva (1697)

Catholic Church titles
Preceded by Baldassare Cenci (seniore)	Titular Archbishop of Larissa in Thessalia; 1697–1707	Succeeded by Giovanni Battista Anguisciola
Preceded by Giuseppe Archinto	Apostolic Nuncio to Spain; 1700–1706	Succeeded by Antonfelice Zondadari
Preceded by Niccolò Radulovich	Cardinal-Priest of San Bartolomeo all'Isola; 1707–1709	Succeeded by Juan Álvaro Cienfuegos Villazón
Preceded by Giacomo Antonio Morigia	Cardinal-Priest of Santa Cecilia; 1709–1725	Succeeded by Filippo Antonio Gualtieri
Preceded by Francesco Pignatelli (seniore)	Cardinal-Bishop of Sabina; 1724–1725	Succeeded by Pietro Ottoboni
