= Gianpaolo Della Chiesa =

Gianpaolo Della Chiesa (1521–1575) was an Italian Roman Catholic bishop and cardinal.

== Biography ==
Gianpaolo Della Chiesa was born in Tortona in 1521. He was a relative of Pope Pius V. He was educated at the University of Padua and the University of Pavia, becoming a doctor of both laws.

He then moved to Milan to practice law. There, he gained a reputation as a renowned lawyer. He later traveled to Spain, where he defended Gonzalo Fernández de Córdoba, 3rd Duke of Terranova in his trial before Philip II of Spain. The king was so impressed with Della Chiesa that he made him a senator of Milan and governor of Pavia for two years.

After the death of his wife, he was sent to Rome by the Senate of Milan to attempt to settle its dispute with Cardinal Charles Borromeo. He gained the appreciation of the pope who made him commendatory abbot of S. Pietro di Muleggio. He also became a Referendary of the Apostolic Signatura.

When Pope Pius V became pope, he initially offered to make Serafino Della Chiesa (Gianpaolo Della Chiesa's uncle and a member of the Canons Regular of the Lateran) his cardinal-nephew, but Serafino refused so Gianpaolo was promoted in his stead. He became a cardinal deacon in the consistory of 24 March 1568. He received the red hat and the deaconry of San Callisto on 5 April 1568.

On 3 May 1568, he was appointed Prefect of the Apostolic Signatura, a post he held until his death. He was one of six cardinals appointed by the pope to investigate the case of Cardinal Innocenzo Ciocchi Del Monte. He opted for the order of cardinal priests on 10 May 1570 and for the titular church of San Pancrazio on 14 May 1570. He also served as a member of the Congregation for the League against the Turks and the Congregation of the Census.

He participated in the papal conclave of 1572 that elected Pope Gregory XIII.

He died in Rome on 11 January 1575 and was buried in his titular church.
