= Innocenzo Ciocchi Del Monte =

16th-century Italian cardinal

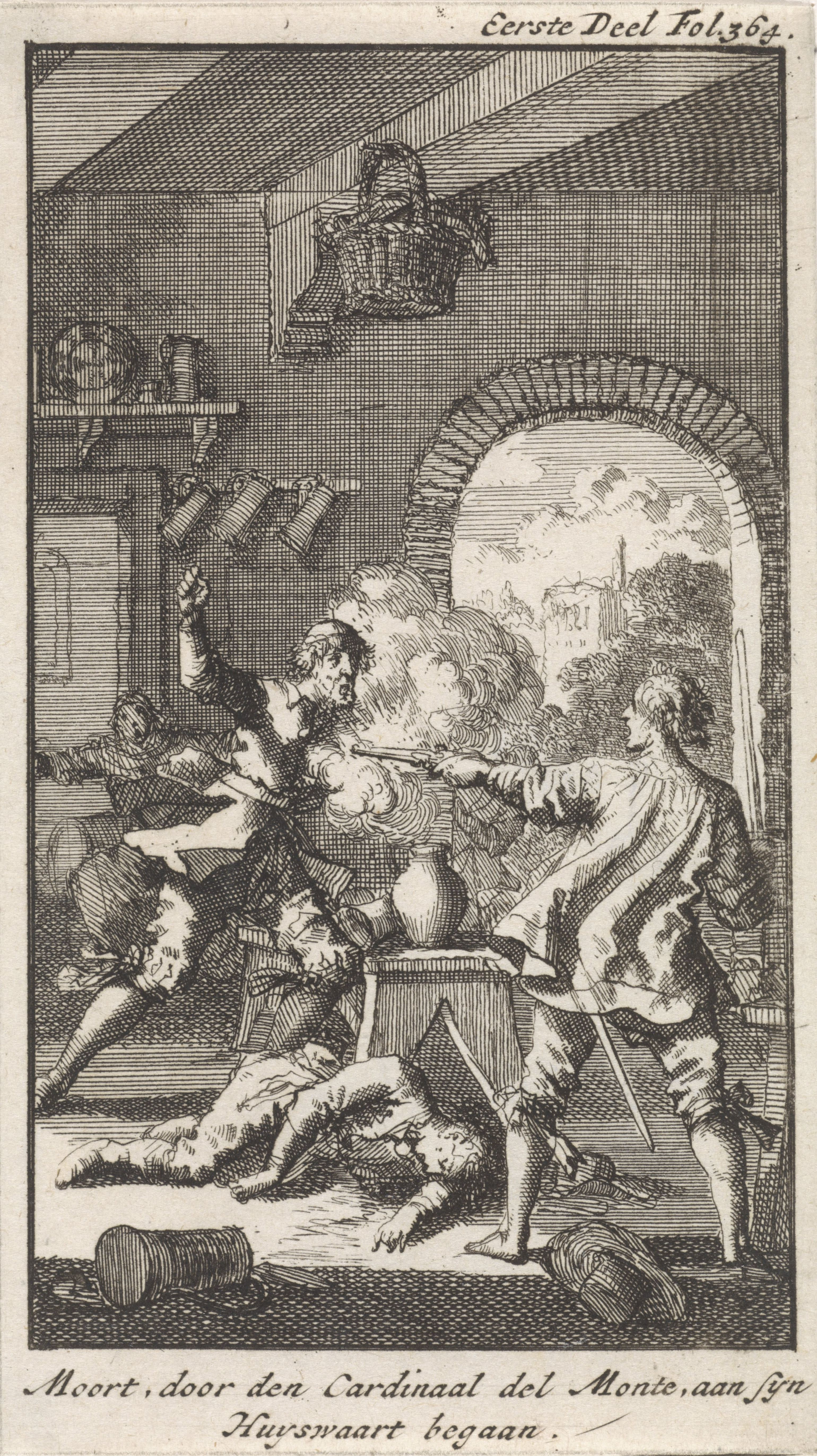
Innocenzo Ciocchi Del Monte murders someone in a tavern; engraving by Jan Luyken.

Innocenzo Ciocchi del Monte (1532 – 2 November 1577) was a notorious cardinal whose relationship with Pope Julius III (born Giovanni Maria Ciocchi del Monte) caused grave scandal in the early 16th century. Born in Borgo San Donnino (now Fidenza) to a beggar-woman and an unknown father, he was picked up in the street by Cardinal Giovanni Maria Ciocchi del Monte and given a position in the household of the cardinal's brother, Baldovino.

Cardinal Giovanni Maria Ciocchi del Monte was elected pope in 1550, taking the name Julius III. He subsequently arranged for Baldovino to adopt Innocenzo, and appointed him cardinal-nephew – the papacy's chief diplomatic and political agent. He proved totally unsuited to this office, and his continuing relationship with Julius, whose bed he openly shared, created considerable scandal both inside and outside the Church. After Julius's death, he was shunned and ignored. Despite committing both rape and murder, he managed to retain his cardinal's hat and was permitted to return to Rome following several periods of banishment. His death passed unremarked, and he was buried in the Ciocchi del Monte family chapel in Rome.

== Early life ==
Innocenzo was born in Borgo San Donnino (now Fidenza) to a beggar-woman and an unknown father. As a boy he was illiterate but vivacious and good-looking. He left home at an extremely early age and made his way to Piacenza, where, at around 13 or 14, he found a position in the household of the city governor, Baldovino Ciocchi del Monte, as a valero, a menial role combining the offices of footman and dogsbody. His father may have been a soldier who had served with Baldovino, which would explain how he came into the household; although alternative stories were told that he had been picked up in the streets by Baldovino's brother, Cardinal Giovanni Maria Ciocchi del Monte. He certainly quickly became a favourite of Giovanni Maria, who placed him in charge of his pet monkey and appointed him provost of the cathedral chapter of Arezzo, a title involving only nominal duties but with certain rights of income.

== Favourite of Pope Julius ==
In February 1550 Cardinal Giovanni Maria Ciocchi del Monte was elected pope. Julius III, as he was henceforth called, immediately made Innocenzo a cardinal. Two years later, faced with hostility to Innocenzo from the other cardinals and a gathering move to have his position annulled on the basis of his illegitimacy and age, Julius had him adopted into the Ciocchi del Monte family and decreed his year of birth as 1532, although this had previously been unknown.

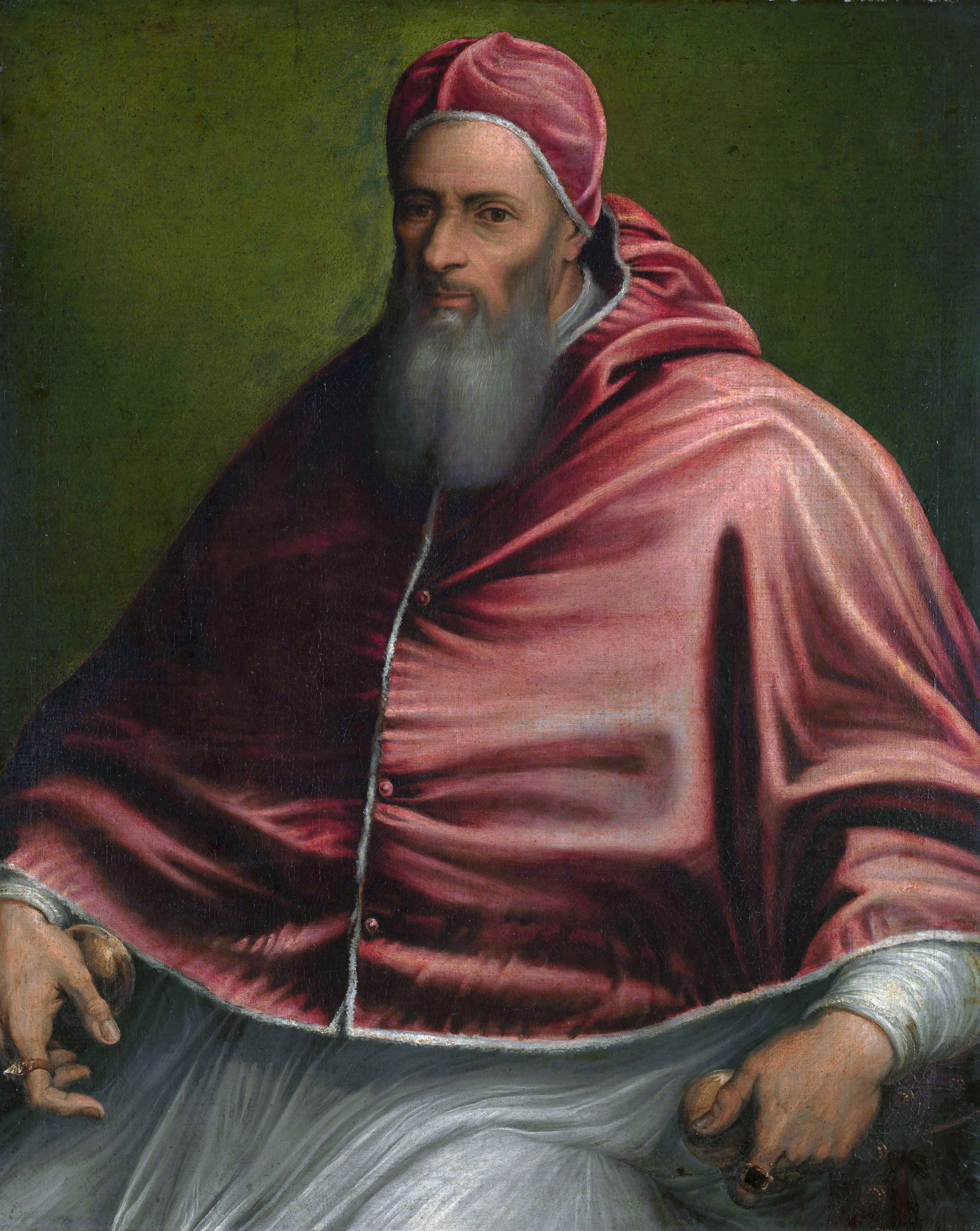
Pope Julius III made Ciocchi del Monte a cardinal.

Attempts to give Innocenzo an education that could have prepared him for ecclesiastic office had been sparse: "a few social graces, a few bits of knowledge, perhaps about the glories of the Classical world, and Innocenzo's formal education was over."

The new cardinal was given numerous important and lucrative positions, including commendatory abbot of the abbeys of Saint-Michel du Tréport in Normandy, S. Zeno in Verona, and of the abbeys of S. Saba, Miramondo, and of Grottaferrata, Frascati. Most significantly, Julius named him Cardinal-Nephew, effectively putting him in charge of all papal correspondence. But the role of secretary to the papacy proved manifestly beyond Innocenzo's abilities, and so, in order to find a way for his favourite to retain the appearance of power without having any real responsibility, Julius upgraded a hitherto minor position, that of secretary intimus, to become Cardinal Secretary of State and appointed Innocenzo to it. This position was eventually to become the highest of Vatican offices; the formal title (Secretary of State to his Holiness) still bears a mark of its original intimacy to the pope.

Cardinals who were more sensitive to the need to reform the mores of the Roman Church, in order mostly to respond to the critique driving much of the Protestant Reformation, protested in vain against Innocenzo's elevation. Instead Innocenzo, although relieved of all real duties, continued to be showered with benefices and high offices—much to the disgust of his fellow cardinals.

Rumours also circulated amongst European courts and correspondents: the Venetian ambassador, Matteo Dandolo, wrote for example that Cardinal Del Monte "was a little scoundrel", and that the Pope "took him [Innocenzo] into his bedroom and into his own bed as if he were his own son or grandson". Onofrio Panvinio, an Augustinian friar and Italian historian, wrote that Julius was "excessively given to intemperance in a life of luxuriousness and to his libido", and more explicitly characterized him as "puerorum amoribus implicitus" ('entangled in love for boys'). One more mocking rumour made the rounds in Rome, saying that Innocenzo had been made a cardinal as a reward for his being the keeper of the pope's monkey. The French poet Joachim du Bellay, who lived in Rome during this period, wrote in 1555: "Yet seeing a footman, a child, a beast, / a rascal, a poltroon made a cardinal / for having taken care of a monkey well, / a Ganymede wearing the red hat on his head / ... these are miracles, my dear Morel, that take place in Rome alone."

Innocenzo's affair with his future adoptive sister-in-law, the noted poet and another favorite in the papal court, Ersilia Cortese, resulted in scandal. Julius considered demoting him from the cardinalate, apparently because he had compromised the pope's credibility—Julius' own jealousy and personal feelings about the affair, between two of his siblings, are less well recorded.

== Crimes and banishment ==
After the death of Julius, Innocenzo took part in the two papal conclaves of 1555. In 1559, on the way to a third conclave from Venice he murdered two men, a father and a son in Nocera Umbra who had "uttered ill words about him". For this crime he was arrested and imprisoned in the Castel Sant'Angelo, by order of Pope Pius IV; and the following year he was moved to the abbey of Montecassino, and placed in solitary confinement. Following the intervention of Cosimo I de' Medici, duke of Florence, Innocenzo was released but nevertheless forced to face a fine of 100,000 scudi, and threatened with the stripping of his cardinalate. From Rome, Innocenzo was banished to Tivoli.

He also participated in the 1565–1566 conclave, which elected Pope Pius V; because of his aura of mischief, the guards searched him and discovered a note hidden in his cloak that contained forbidden information; this discovery caused an incredible stir and from that moment until the end of the conclave, Innocenzo and his conclavists were guarded more closely than any other cardinal in the conclave.

In 1567, Innocenzo was accused of raping two low-class women in Brevia, near Siena. Charges were brought against him and he was brought to Rome with two Theatine priests assigned to act as guards. An investigation recommended against his execution or degradation, but he was nevertheless once again banished by Pope Pius V to Montecassino and then Bergamo. From there, Innocenzo worked with friendly cardinals to petition the new pope to release him from the monastery. To strengthen the case for his release, and to demonstrate that his outlook and attitude had changed, he began to project the image of a reformed prelate. Pope Gregory XIII restored Innocenzo's freedom and allowed him to return to Rome: "[b]ut his crown did not mean what it once did, because upon his return, Innocenzo was, once again, despised by all."

In 1562 he was given the titular church of San Callisto.

== Death and burial ==
Innocenzo died in Rome on 2 November 1577 and was buried within a few hours—beneath an unmarked slab in the Ciocchi del Monte family chapel at the church of San Pietro in Montorio, Rome. According to his biographer Burkle-Young, Cardinal Innocenzo del Monte's "burial was unattended. There was no commemoration of his cardinalate, and no prayers for the repose of his soul. Shunned and ignored in life, he was forgotten in death."

== Bibliography ==
- Burkle-Young, Francis A; Doerrer, Michael Leopoldo (1997). The Life of Cardinal Innocenzo del Monte: A Scandal in Scarlet. Edwin Mellen Press.
