= Giovanni Vincenzo Acquaviva d'Aragona =

Italian cardinal (1490/1495–1664)

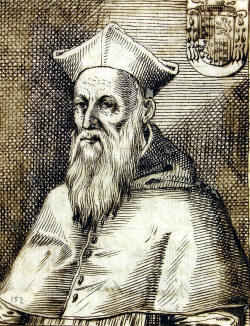
Giovanni Vincenzo Acquaviva d'Aragona

Giovanni Vincenzo Acquaviva d'Aragona (born between 1490 and 1495 in Naples in Italy, died 16 August 1546 in Itri) was a Cardinal of the Roman Catholic Church. He became bishop of Melfi and Rapolla in 1537.

== Life ==
Giovanni Vincenzo Acquaviva d'Aragona was born in Naples in the illustrious and powerful noble houses of southern Italy. He was born as the son of Andrea Matteo III Acquaviva d'Aragona, eighth duke of Atri, 15th Count of Conversano and Count of Caserta, and his wife Isabella Piccolomini.

In February 1537, he was elected bishop of the diocese of Melfi and Rapolla; and in June that year, Archpriest of Santa Maria in Platea di San Flaviano. He was made cardinal by Pope Paul III on 2 June 1542 and Prefect of Castle Sant'Angelo. Ten days later, he was given the titular seat of San Martino ai Monti. He died on 16 August 1546 in Itri.

Grand-uncle of Cardinals Giulio Acquaviva d'Aragona and Ottavio Acquaviva d'Aragona (seniore) (1591). Other cardinals of the family are Ottavio Acquaviva d'Aragona (iuniore) (1654); Francesco Acquaviva d'Aragona (1706); Troiano Acquaviva d'Aragona (1732); and Pasquale Acquaviva d'Aragona (1770).

== Giulio Acquaviva d'Aragona ==
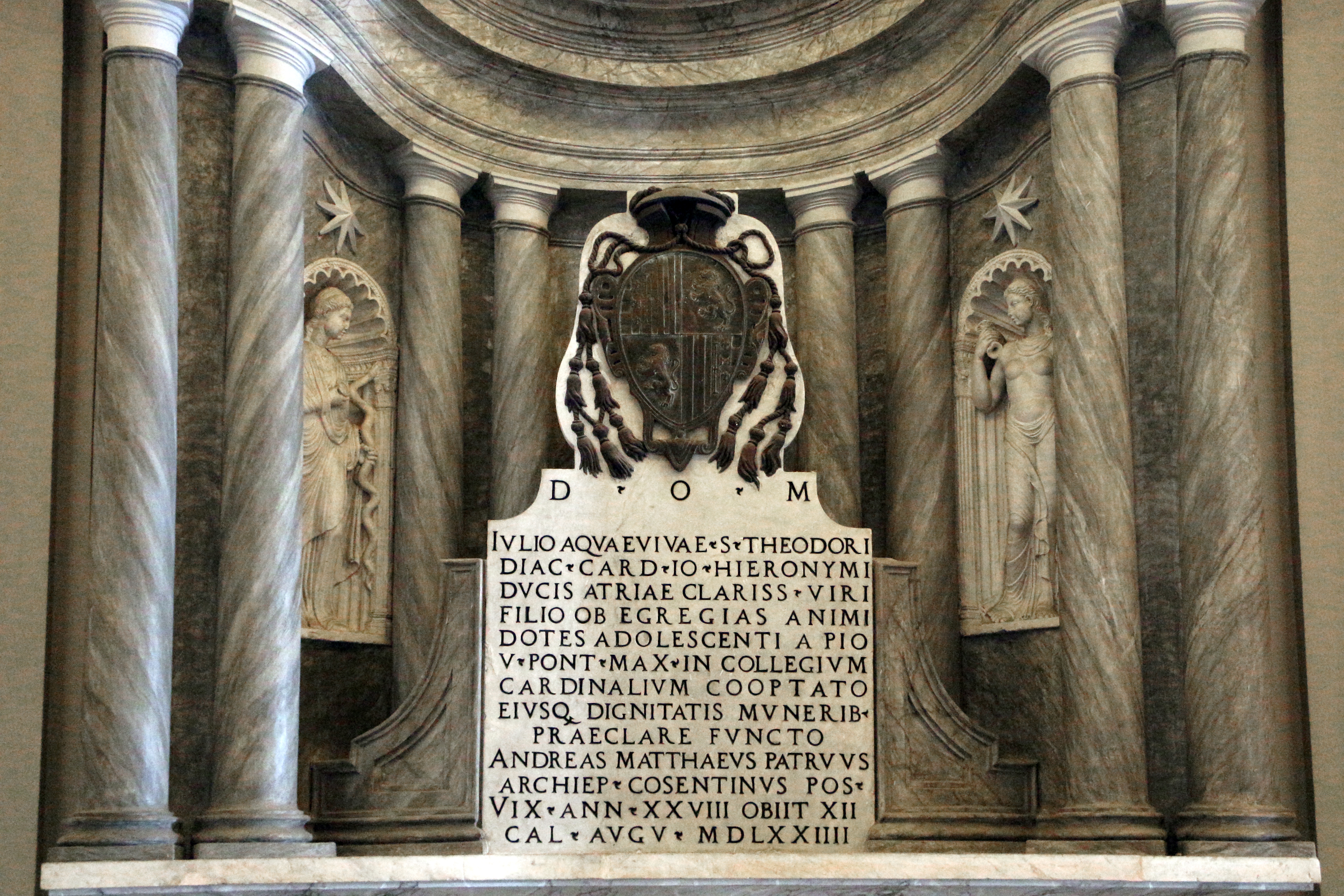
Tomb

Giulio Acquaviva d'Aragona (1546–1574) was an Italian Roman Catholic cardinal. Giulio Acquaviva d'Aragona was born in Naples in 1546, the son of patricians Giangirolamo Acquaviva d'Aragona, (great-grandson of Andrea Matteo Acquaviva, 8th Duke of Atri). His mother was Margherita Pio di Carpi. He was the grand-nephew of Cardinal Giovanni Vincenzo Acquaviva d'Aragona and nephew of Claudio Acquaviva, the Superior General of the Jesuits. His brother Ottavio Acquaviva d'Aragona (seniore) also became cardinal and another brother, Rodolfo Acquaviva, is remembered for becoming a Christian martyr in India.

He moved to Rome in 1566. There, he became a Referendary of the Apostolic Signatura. Pope Pius V sent him as ambassador to Phillip II of Spain in an attempt to resolve a question of ecclesiastical jurisdiction. He accomplished this mission successfully, earning the goodwill of the pope.

Pope Pius V made him a cardinal deacon in the consistory of 17 May 1570. He received the red hat and the deaconry of San Teodoro on 9 June 1570. He attended Pope Pius V on his deathbed. He participated in the papal conclave of 1572 that elected Pope Gregory XIII.

He died in Rome on 21 July 1574, at the age of twenty-eight. He was buried in the Archbasilica of St. John Lateran.
