= Zaccaria Delfino =

Italian Roman Catholic bishop and cardinal

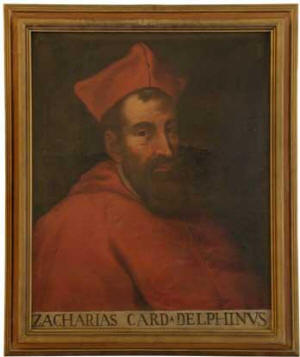
Zaccaria Delfino

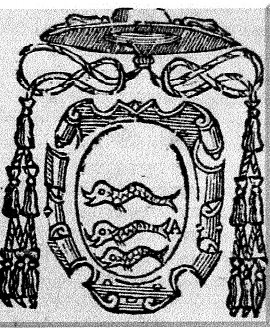
Coat of arms of Cardinal Zaccaria Delfino

Zaccaria Delfino (1527–1584) was an Italian Roman Catholic bishop and cardinal. He served as bishop in modern-day Croatia, served as the papal nuncio to the Habsburg monarchy and participated in the Council of Trent before becoming a Cardinal in 1565. He was a member of the papal conclave that elected Pope Pius V and was named vice-protector of Germany.

== Biography ==
Zaccaria Delfino was born in Venice on 29 March 1527, the son of a Venetian patrician family. He was educated at the University of Padua.

In 1550, he moved to Rome and was ordained as a priest. During the pontificate of Pope Julius III, he was a papal prelate. Under Pope Paul IV, he was a protonotary apostolic.

On 5 May 1553, he was elected as Bishop of Hvar. He was nuncio in the Holy Roman Empire from 7 February 1554 to August 1555. In January 1555, he accompanied Cardinal Giovanni Morone, papal legate a latere, to the Diet of Augsburg. Upon the death of Pope Julius III, Cardinal Morone and Cardinal Otto Truchsess von Waldburg returned to Rome for the papal conclave, leaving Bishop Delfino as the only papal representative at the Diet. In July 1555, he traveled to Rome to report on the Diet to Pope Paul IV. The new pope named him nuncio to Ferdinand I. He was nuncio to the Habsburg monarchy from 22 March 1561 until October 1565. He participated in the Council of Trent 1562-63 and was charged with conveying the decisions of the council to the German bishops.

Pope Pius IV made him a cardinal priest in the consistory of 12 March 1565. He received the red hat and the titular church of Santa Maria in Aquiro (a deaconry raised pro illa vice to the status of title) on 7 September 1565.

He participated in the papal conclave of 1565-66 that elected Pope Pius V, but not in the papal conclave of 1572 that elected Pope Gregory XIII. In 1573, he became vice-protector of Germany and president of the Congregatio Germanica.

He resigned from the government of Hvar sometime before 22 March 1574. On 15 April 1578, he opted for the titular church of Santo Stefano Rotondo, and later for Sant'Anastasia al Palatino on 17 August 1579. He was Camerlengo of the Sacred College of Cardinals from 8 January 1582 to 10 January 1583.

He died in Rome on 19 December 1583. He was buried in Santa Maria sopra Minerva.
