= Mary Hollingsworth =

British historian (born 1950)

Elizabeth Mary Hollingsworth (born November 1950) is a British historian who specialises in the history of medieval Italy.

Hollingsworth gained a BSc in business studies from the University of Manchester and a Ph.D. in art history from the University of East Anglia, where she later taught. She has studied the letters of Cardinal Ippolito II d'Este, and was a senior academic on the Material Renaissance Project.

== Selected publications ==
- Catherine de' Medici: The Life and Times of the Serpent Queen (2024)
- Princes of the Renaissance (2021)
- The Medici (2017); US edition title The Family Medici: The Hidden History of the Medici Dynasty (2018)
- Conclave: 1559 (2013)
- The Borgias: History's Most Notorious Dynasty (2011) ISBN 0857389165
- Art in World History (2008)
- The Cardinal’s Hat: Money, Ambition and Housekeeping in a Renaissance Court (2004)
- Patronage in Sixteenth Century Italy (1996)
- Patronage in Renaissance Italy: From 1400 to the Early Sixteenth Century (1994)
- Architecture of the 20th Century (1988) ISBN 0861244621
