= Jean Suau =

French Roman Catholic bishop and cardinal

Jean Suau (1503–1566) was a French Roman Catholic bishop and cardinal. He started his career as an ecclesiastical court auditor before he was consecrated a bishop and later a cardinal. Suau participated in the papal conclave of 1559 that elected Pope Pius IV. and the papal conclave of 1565-66 that elected Pope Pius V.

== Biography ==
=== Early life and education ===
Jean Suau was born in the Castle of Rieumes in Gascony in 1503. He studied canon law and civil law.

=== Career ===
Moving to Rome, he became an auditor, first of the Apostolic Palace, then of the Roman Rota.

On 20 December 1555 he was elected Bishop of Mirepoix. He was subsequently consecrated as a bishop.

Pope Paul IV made him a cardinal priest in the consistory of 20 December 1555. He received the red hat and the titular church of San Giovanni a Porta Latina on 13 January 1556.

He participated in the papal conclave of 1559 that elected Pope Pius IV. Under Paul IV, he served as Prefect of the Apostolic Signatura. He opted for the titular church of Santa Prisca on 26 April 1560. He resigned the government of Mirepoix sometime before 31 January 1561. He later participated in the papal conclave of 1565-66 that elected Pope Pius V.

=== Death ===
He died in the Apostolic Palace on 29 April 1566. He was buried in Santo Spirito in Sassia.
