= Giovanni Battista Bracelli (bishop) =

Italian Catholic bishop (died 1590)

Most Reverend Giovanni Battista Bracelli
- Bishop of Luni e Sarzana
- Church: Catholic Church
- Diocese: Diocese of Luni e Sarzana
- In office: 1572–1590
- Predecessor: Benedetto Lomellini
- Successor: Giovanni Battista Salvago

Orders
- Consecration: 4 July 1572 by Paolo Burali d'Arezzo

Personal details
- Born: Genoa, Italy
- Died: 17 April 1590

Giovanni Battista Bracelli (died 17 April 1590) was a Roman Catholic prelate who served as Bishop of Luni e Sarzana (1572–1590).

== Biography ==
Giovanni Battista Bracelli was born in Genoa, Italy. On 2 June 1572, he was appointed during the papacy of Pope Gregory XIII as Bishop of Luni e Sarzana. On 4 July 1572, he was consecrated bishop by Paolo Burali d'Arezzo, Bishop of Piacenza, with Thomas Goldwell, Bishop of Saint Asaph, and Francesco Cittadini, Bishop of Castro del Lazio, serving as co-consecrators. He served as Bishop of Luni e Sarzana until his death on 17 April 1590.

== See also ==
- Catholic Church in Italy

== External links and additional sources ==
- Cheney, David M. "Diocese of La Spezia-Sarzana-Brugnato". Catholic-Hierarchy.org. (for Chronology of Bishops) ^{[self-published]}
- Chow, Gabriel. "Titular Episcopal See of Luni (Italy)". GCatholic.org. (for Chronology of Bishops) ^{[self-published]}

Catholic Church titles
Preceded by Benedetto Lomellini	Bishop of Luni e Sarzana; 1572–1590	Succeeded by Giovanni Battista Salvago
