= Diego de Espinosa =

Catholic cardinal and inquisitor

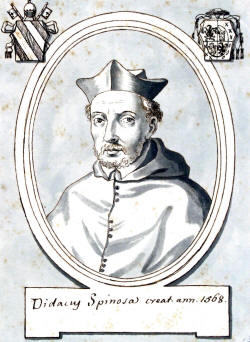
Portrait of Cardinal Diego de Espinosa

Diego de Espinosa y de Arévalo (September 1502 – 5 September 1572) was a Spanish churchman.

== Life ==
Born at Martín Muñoz de las Posadas (modern province of Segovia), he was educated in civil law, canon law and theology at the University of Salamanca.

He was Councillor of the Royal Council of Castile, 1562, and President of the Royal Council of Castile, 1565. He was ordained a priest in 1567, and created Cardinal, by Pope Pius V, after March 1568. He was Bishop of Sigüenza (1568–1572), and Inquisitor General (December 1566 – 1572).

He was to be honoured with a title of Marquis and the building of a palace at the expense of King Philip II of Spain, but he only accepted the building in his village of a palace bearing the Crown Royal Arms as paid by public money. This still exists, and is presently used by the Town Hall and secondary schools.

His directness was not appreciated by many, but it is said that the rigid King Philip II, on learning of his death in 1572, commented that he had lost his best-ever Minister. de Espinosa was prematurely pronounced dead. As the embalmer was opening his chest cavity to prepare his body for embalming, he revived and pushed the knife away. He died from the incision.

== Memorial ==
A magnificent praying sculpture of him, by Leone Leoni and his son Pompeo Leoni, can be found in the village church.

Catholic Church titles
Preceded by Fernando de Valdés y Salas	Grand Inquisitor of Spain; 1566–1572	Succeeded by Pedro Ponce de León
