= 1555 papal conclave =

1555 papal conclave may refer to:

- April 1555 conclave, which elected Marcellus II to succeed Julius III
- May 1555 conclave, which elected Paul IV to succeed Marcellus II
