= Ottavio Acquaviva d'Aragona (1560–1612) =

Italian Roman Catholic cardinal and archbishop (1560–1612)

His Eminence Ottavio Acquaviva d'Aragona
- Cardinal-Priest of Santa Prassede; Archbishop of Naples
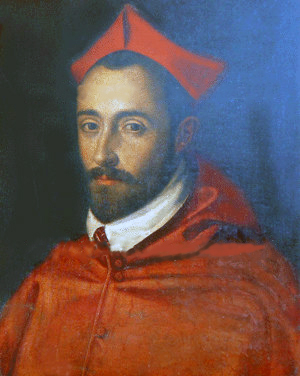
- Church: Catholic Church

Orders
- Consecration: 18 September 1605 by Roberto Francesco Romolo Bellarmino

Personal details
- Born: 1560 Naples, Italy
- Died: December 5, 1612 (aged 51–52)
- Coat of arms

Ottavio Acquaviva d'Aragona, seniore (1560–1612) was an Italian Roman Catholic cardinal and archbishop.

== Biography ==
He was born in Naples in 1560 to Duke Giovan Girolamo and Margherita Pio. He was a brother of Cardinal Giulio Acquaviva d'Aragona and Blessed Rodolfo Acquaviva, who was martyred in 1583 in the East Indies. Ottavio studied law at the University of Perugia, from which he received a doctorate in 1582.

He studied "belle lettere" and Greek at the University of Perugia and obtained a degree in utroque iure. Then he went to Rome and entered the Curia, initially as a referendum of the Supreme Court of the Apostolic Signatura. Between 1590 and 1591, he was majordomo for Pope Gregory XIV.

Pope Gregory XIV raised him to the rank of cardinal of the Catholic Church in the consistory of 6 March 1591 and on 5 April of the same year he received the deaconage of St. George in Velabro.

From 1593 to 1601, he was a legate of Avignon, but in 1597 returned to Rome. On 22 April 1602, he opted for the title of Saints John and Paul and on 5 June 1605 for that of Santa Prassede.

On 18 September 1605, he was consecrated bishop by Roberto Francesco Romolo Bellarmino, Archbishop Emeritus of Capua, with Antonio Caetani (iuniore), Archbishop of Capua, serving as co-consecrator.

On 31 August 1605, he was elected archbishop of Naples, where he went at the end of November of that same year. He celebrated the diocesan synods of 1607, 1611 and 1612.

He took part in four conclaves: that of 1591 which elected Pope Innocent IX, that of 1592 which elected Pope Clement VIII and both the conclaves of 1605 which elected Pope Leo XI and Pope Paul V.

He died in Naples at the age of 52 and was buried in the Duomo.

== Episcopal succession ==
Episcopal succession of Ottavio Acquaviva d'Aragona

While bishop, he was the principal consecrator of:

- Ambrogio Gozzeo, Bishop of Trebinje e Mrkan (1609);
- Girolamo Palazzuoli, Bishop of Isola (1610);
- Agostino Gradenigo, Bishop of Feltre (1610); and
- Tomás Dávalos de Aragón, Titular Patriarch of Antioch (1611).

Catholic Church titles
Preceded by Benedetto Giustiniani	Cardinal-Deacon of San Giorgio in Velabro; 1591–1593	Succeeded by Cinzio Passeri Aldobrandini
Preceded by Scipione Gonzaga	Cardinal-Priest of Santa Maria del Popolo; 1593–1602	Succeeded by Francesco Mantica
Preceded by Camillo Borghese	Cardinal-Priest of Santi Giovanni e Paolo; 1602–1605	Succeeded by Pietro Aldobrandini
Preceded by Antonio Maria Gallo	Cardinal-Priest of Santa Prassede; 1605–1612	Succeeded by Bartolomeo Cesi (cardinal)
Preceded by Alfonso Gesualdo di Conza	Archbishop of Naples; 1605–1612	Succeeded by Decio Carafa
