= Paolo Burali d'Arezzo =

Italian priest

His Eminence, Blessed Paolo Burali d'Arezzo
- Cardinal, Archbishop of Naples
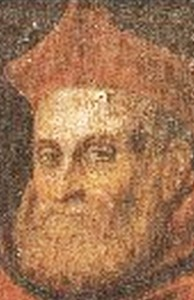
- Paolo Burali d'Arezzo
- Church: Roman Catholic Church
- Archdiocese: Naples
- See: Naples
- In office: 19 September 1576 - 17 June 1578
- Predecessor: Mario Carafa
- Successor: Annibale de Capua
- Other post: Cardinal-Priest of Santa Pudenziana
- Previous post: Bishop of Piacenza (1568-1576)

Orders
- Ordination: 26 March 1558
- Consecration: 1 August 1568 by Scipione Rebiba
- Created cardinal: 17 May 1570 by Pope Pius V
- Rank: Cardinal-Priest

Personal details
- Born: Scipione Burali d'Arezzo; 1511 Itri, Lazio, Papal States
- Died: 17 June 1578 (aged 66–67) Torre del Greco, Kingdom of Naples
- Buried: San Paolo Maggiore (Naples)

Sainthood
- Feast day: 17 June
- Venerated in: Roman Catholic Church
- Title as Saint: Blessed
- Beatified: 18 June 1772; Rome, Papal States by Pope Clement XIV
- Attributes: Cardinal's attire; Crucifix
- Patronage: Diocese of Arezzo

Ordination history of Paolo Burali d'Arezzo
History
Episcopal consecration
- Principal consecrator: Scipione Rebiba
- Co-consecrators: Giulio Antonio Santorio, Thomas Goldwell, C.R.
Episcopal succession
Bishops consecrated by Paolo Burali d'Arezzo as principal consecrator
- Giovanni Battista Bracelli: 4 July 1572

Paolo Burali d'Arezzo (1511 – 17 June 1578) was an Italian priest of the Theatine Order, a bishop, and cardinal of the Roman Catholic Church. His legal skills made him a prominent figure in the law courts of Naples, and then in the councils of government as a defender of the rights of citizens. He abandoned his career to pursue a calling to the religious state, where he became a leader in the Theatine Order. Pope Pius V elevated him to the cardinalate in 1570. He was considered a candidate for the Papacy in 1572, but his stern character did not recommend him to the electors. The new Pope, Gregory XIII, then promoted him to be the Archbishop of Naples, where he served from 1576 to 1578. After his death, he was recognized as beatified and worthy of official recognition by the Church.

== Biography ==
=== Early life ===
Born in Itri, south of Rome, near Gaeta, in 1511, with the baptismal name of Scipione Burali d’Arezzo, he was the second son of Paolo Burali d’Arezzo and his wife Vittoria Olivares of Barcelona. The father Paolo was a bureaucrat, who was for a time in the service of King Ferdinand the Catholic, performed some diplomatic duties for Pope Clement VII, and was later a member of the entourage of Prospero Colonna, the Count of Fondi, Generalissimo of the Spanish armies, serving as Segretario Maggiore. When his wife died, Scipione's father Paolo became a priest. He subsequently became a chamberlain to Pope Clement VII (1521-1534), and served on diplomatic missions to the Emperor Charles V, King François I of France, and Duke Francesco Sforza of Milan.

When Scipione was 13, he entered the University of Salerno, and later studied law at Bologna, where he was a pupil of Ugo Buoncompagni. For about a decade, Scipione worked as a lawyer in Naples, earning the nickname "Principe del foro napolitano – Prince of Neapolitan Rights," for his devotion to championing the people against their Spanish overlords while acquiring a reputation for his legal knowledge, professionalism, and honesty. In 1548, he was named a member of the Royal Council, the principal advisory body to the viceroy, Pedro de Toledo. Scipione undertook many important tasks in this connection, defining the legal relationship between the crown and the nobles, clarifying the rights of the king and those of the pope within the kingdom, and so forth.

=== Religious Life, Priesthood, Episcopate ===
In 1555, Paolo d'Arezzo was sent on an embassy to the pope, doubtless in connection with Philip II's assumption of his feudal rights and obligations with regard to the Kingdom of Naples. He so impressed Pope Paul IV with his business-like and accommodating manner that he was offered a position at the papal court, that of Auditor of the Rota. Scipione refused, and returned to Naples, where he served as a high official (Auditor General of the Army) in the civil administration of the Neapolitan army. Not yet 44 years old, he had already attained a considerable measure of success and wealth. In the Spring of 1556, his mother died. Scipione apparently found that his worldly accomplishments were not spiritually rewarding. He became increasingly religious as the years went by, adopting an austere lifestyle. This process culminated on 25 January 1557, when Scipione was accepted by his spiritual advisor, Giovanni Marinonio, as a lay brother; contrary to the Theatine custom (which required months of probation), Burali was vested with the habit on 2 February 1557, only a week after his admission, adopting the name "Paolo Burali d’Arezzo". He expected to continue to serve as a lay brother, but his superiors decided that he should take the tonsure and enter Holy Orders.

Paolo Burali became a priest on 26 March 1558. In 1560, at the age of 49, after only three years in the Theatine Order, he became Praepositus of the House of S. Paul in Naples; he was reelected in 1563 and 1564. From July 1564 to May 1565, he was one of the ambassadors of Naples—at the command of Pope Pius IV—to lay the question of what to do with the goods of convicted heretics before the Spanish King, who was also King of Naples. When Philip II took more than six months with the issue, and still had made no decision, Burali simply returned to Naples, where he was reelected Praepositus of S. Paolo for 1565 and again for 1566. In April 1567, he was in Rome for the General Chapter of his Order, and at the command of his superiors, he stayed on as Praepositus of S. Silvestro. He spent many years working on commissions charged with revising the education and discipline of the clergy, serving on diplomatic missions for the Holy See, attending the Council of Trent, at which he played an important role, and as head of the principal Theatine house in Rome.

Perhaps his most important accomplishment was in helping to prevent the establishment of the Spanish Inquisition in Naples, a matter about which the Neapolitans were very adamant. Neapolitan feelings about the Spanish Inquisition were so strong that a baronial rebellion in 1547 liberated hundreds of people from inquisitorial prisons. The obvious popular hostility, combined with persuasive arguments by Paolo and other opponents of the "Holy Office," led to the Crown backing down, at least for the time being.

Over the years, he was offered several bishoprics, first Castellammare (which was in fact vacant from 1559 to 1562), then Cotrone (which became vacant in 1565) and finally the Archbishopric of Brindisi (vacant from November 1560 to June 1564) offered to him by King Philip II. But he refused them all. Finally, in 1568, when the Theatine, Berardino Scotti, resigned the See of Piacenza, Pope Pius V commanded Paolo to accept the See of Piacenza "on penalty of mortal sin."

He was consecrated on 1 August 1568, by Cardinal Scipione Rebiba, titular Patriarch of Constantinople, with Giulio Antonio Santorio, Archbishop of Santa Severina, and Thomas Goldwell, Bishop of Saint Asaph, serving as co-consecrators. In 1570, before he set out for Rome to receive his red hat, Bishop Bureli held a diocesan synod.

=== Cardinalate ===
Pius V went on to make Paolo a cardinal on 15 May 1570, over the objections of the Spanish government. Burali was named Cardinal Priest of S. Pudenziana on 20 November 1570. When Pius V died in 1572, Burali was present at the deathbed. Paolo was considered a candidate for the papacy (papabile, in Curial terminology) in the Conclave that followed. It was said that the leader of this alleged movement was Cardinal Alessandrino (Michele Bonelli), the great-nephew of Pius V. Although his cause was supported by Cardinal Carlo Borromeo, and some others, it was strongly opposed by the Grand Duke of Florence, Cosimo III, whose agents were able to enlist the support—or rather the opposition—of some of the cardinals who had been created by Pius IV and Pius V. Both Burali and Borromeo were known to be uncompromising personalities, and enthusiastic for the immediate implementation of all of the decrees of the Council of Trent. Both would be difficult to deal with if either was the pope, in negotiations with the rulers of various European principalities. In any case, Burali was not the leading candidate. He was eclipsed by Cardinal Giovanni Morone, Cardinal Alessandro Farnese, and Cardinal Ippolito d'Este. The Conclave finally elected none of them, but instead chose as a compromise the 70-year-old Ugo Boncompagni, Paolo's former professor of jurisprudence, who took the name Gregory XIII. Cardinal Burali remained in Rome until October, and then returned to Piacenza.

He took part in the Council summoned by Cardinal Carlo Borromeo in Milan in 1573. And in September he presided over his second diocesan synod in Piacenza. He founded a convent for "converted women" (prostitutes), and an orphanage. In accordance with the directions of the Council of Trent, he founded a seminary for his diocese. He brought both the Theatines and the Somaschi to work in the diocese of Piacenza. He went to Rome in October 1574, along with a band of pilgrims, to participate in the Jubilee of 1575, which began at Christmas 1574; he stayed in Rome until April 1575.

Four years later, on 19 September 1576, Gregory XIII made Paolo the Archbishop of Naples, over the objection (it is said) of Don Luis de Requesens y Zúñiga, the Ambassador of the King of Spain before the Holy See. In Spain the business of the Inquisition of Naples was remembered. As Archbishop of Naples, Paolo implemented numerous reforms, ensuring compliance with the decisions of the Council of Trent, while continuing to clash with the Spanish authorities over the Inquisition and other matters. A competent scholar, as well as a notable clergyman, Paolo died 17 June 1578 at the age of 67, after only 21 months as Archbishop, with much of his work unfinished, a "mournful loss for all Christendom" in the words of St. Filippo Neri.

=== Beatification ===
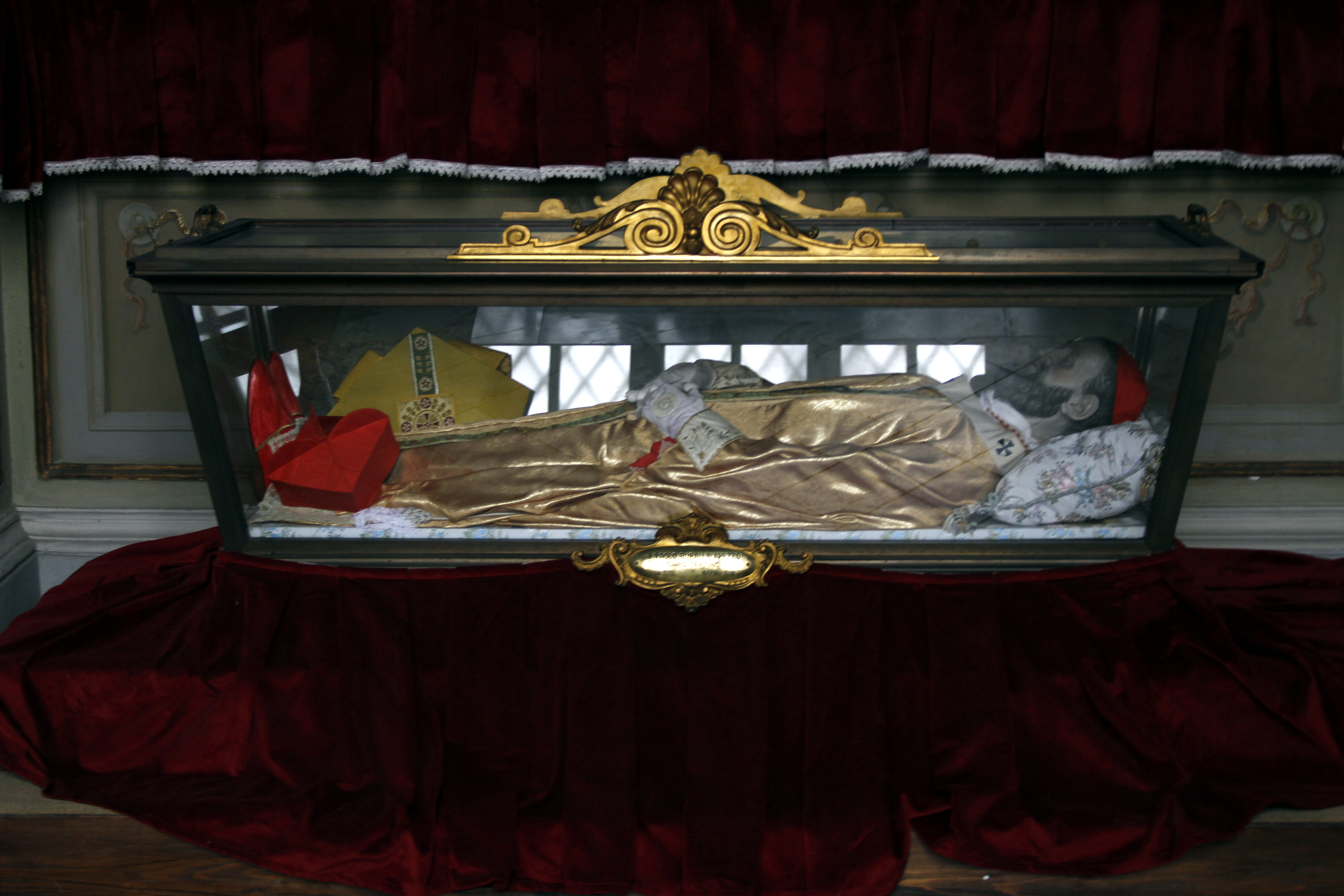
Body of Blessed Paolo Burali d'Arezzo in San Paolo Maggiore (Naples).

In life, Paolo Burali was an acquaintance of the later Saints Carlo Borromeo, Andrea Avellino, Roberto Bellarmino, and Pius V. On the tenth anniversary of his death, Paolo was elevated to the status of Venerable by Pope Sixtus V, and in 1772, he was beatified by Clement XIV.

His cause (application) for sainthood is still pending in the Sacred Congregation for the Causes of Saints, after nearly 250 years.

== Bibliography ==
- Paolo Burali (Catholic-Hierarchy)
- Miranda, Salvador. "BURALI D'AREZZO, Theat., Paolo (1511-1578)". The Cardinals of the Holy Roman Church. Florida International University. OCLC 53276621.
- Epistolario del beato Paolo Burali: cardinale teatino, vescovo di Piacenza, arcivescovo di Napoli (1511-1578) (Brescia: Centro bresciano di iniziative culturali, 1977).
- Piacenza e il B. Paolo Burali: atti del convegno di studio in occasione del IV centenario dalla morte (Deputazione di storia patria per le province parmensi, 1979) [Archivio storico per le province parmensi 4th series, Vol. 30, t. 2].
- Franco Molinari, Il Card. Teatino Beato Paolo Burali e la riforma tridentina a Piacenza (1568-1578) (Rome: Gregorian University 1957) [Analecta Gregoriana 87].
- F. Burali d'Arezzo, Brevi cenni sulla vita del Beato Paolo Burali d'Arezzo seconda edizione (Napoli 1876).
- G. B. Maffi, Vita del Beato Paolo d' Arezzo (Piacenza 1833).
- G. B. Bonaglia, Vlta del Beato Paolo Burali d' Arezzo, Chierico Regolare, Cardinale di S. Pudenziana (Napoli 1772).
- Giovanni Bonifacio Bagata, CR, Vita del Venerabile Paolo Burali d'Arezzo (Verona 1698).
