= Ippolito II d'Este =

Italian cardinal and statesman (1509–1572)

Ippolito (II) d'Este
- Cardinal-Deacon of Santa Maria Nuova
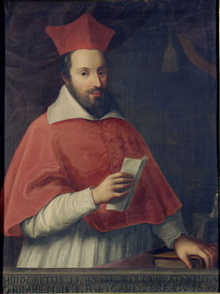
- Church: Catholic Church
- See: Santa Maria Nuova
- In office: 13 April 1565 – 2 December 1572
- Predecessor: Federico Gonzaga
- Successor: Filippo Guastavillani
- Other post: Administrator of Narbonne (1550-1551, 1563-1572)
- Previous posts: Administrator of Arles (1562-1567); Cardinal-Deacon of Santa Maria in Aquiro (1539-Oct 1564, Dec 1564-1565); Cardinal-Deacon of Santa Maria in Via Lata (1564); Administrator of Lyon (1539-1551, 1562-1564); Administrator of Auch (1551-1563); Administrator of Milan (1519-1550, 1555-1556) (Arch)Bishop of Novara (1550-1551); Administrator of Autun (1547-1550); Administrator of Tréguier (1542-1548)

Orders
- Created cardinal: 20 December 1538 by Pope Paul III

Personal details
- Born: 25 August 1509 Ferrara, Duchy of Ferrara
- Died: 2 December 1572 (aged 63) Rome, Papal States
- Parents: Alfonso I d'Este; Lucrezia Borgia
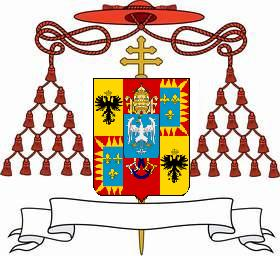
- Coat of arms

Ippolito (II) d'Este (25 August 1509 – 2 December 1572) was an Italian cardinal and statesman. He was a member of the House of Este, and nephew of the other Ippolito d'Este, also a cardinal. He despoiled the then 1,400-year-old Hadrian's Villa, built by the Roman emperor Hadrian, removing marbles and statues from it to decorate his own villa, the Villa d'Este.

== Biography ==
Ippolito was born in Ferrara, Italy, the second son of Duke Alfonso I d'Este and Lucrezia Borgia. His elder brother, Ercole II d'Este, succeeded his father as Duke of Ferrara in 1534. Through their mother, Ippolito and Ercole were grandsons of Pope Alexander VI. Ippolito himself is named after his uncle, Cardinal Ippolito d'Este.

In 1519, at the age of 10, he was granted the archbishopric of Milan in succession to his uncle, by Pope Leo X. This was the first of a long list of ecclesiastical benefices which Ippolito was given over time, the revenue from which was his main source of income. In addition to Milan, at the end of his life, Ippolito also held the benefices of the sees/abbeys of Bondeno, Chaalis (1540–1572), Jumieges in Normandy, Lyon, Narbonne, and Saint-Médard in Soissons.

Ippolito d'Este was created Cardinal of Santa Maria in Aquiro by Pope Paul III in the consistory on 20 December 1538. He was ordained a priest in 1564.

== Patronage of the arts ==
A lover of luxuries and magnificence, he overhauled the Palazzo San Francesco in Ferrara before his first appointment to the French court. After his elevation to the College of Cardinals in 1538, he refurbished the palace of his cousin, Cardinal Ercole Gonzaga, which he rented as his cardinalatial residence in Rome. He had the Villa d'Este built in Tivoli by Mannerist architect Pirro Ligorio, to match the other palaces he was building in Rome. To decorate his villa, he had much of the marbles and statues taken from the nearby ancient Hadrian's Villa, as a result of which the latter is devoid of most of its original features.

Ippolito d'Este also helped to sponsor the career of the composer Palestrina.

== Statesman ==
At the time of his elevation to Cardinal, he was the Ferrarese ambassador to the French court, whose interests he was to see to personally as Cardinal-Protector of France from 1549, in the reign of Henry II. In 1550, he was governor of the French-controlled territory Tivoli. Such was the strength of his relationship with the French court that he was the French candidate in the conclave which elected Pope Julius III, Paul III's successor.

After this defeat, he mostly abandoned active ecclesiastical politics, although he continued to visit Rome and, in fact, eventually died in Rome after a short illness. He was buried in Tivoli's church of Santa Maria Maggiore, next to his villa.

A significant number of Ippolito's letters and account books from his household have survived. This collection, including more than 2,000 letters and over 200 account books, is housed in the archives in Modena, a hereditary seat of the Este family. These materials form the basis for Mary Hollingsworth's book, The Cardinal's Hat (2004), a social history of Ippolito d'Este and his times.
