= Pope Pius V =

Head of the Catholic Church from 1566 to 1572

Pope Saint Pius V
- Bishop of Rome
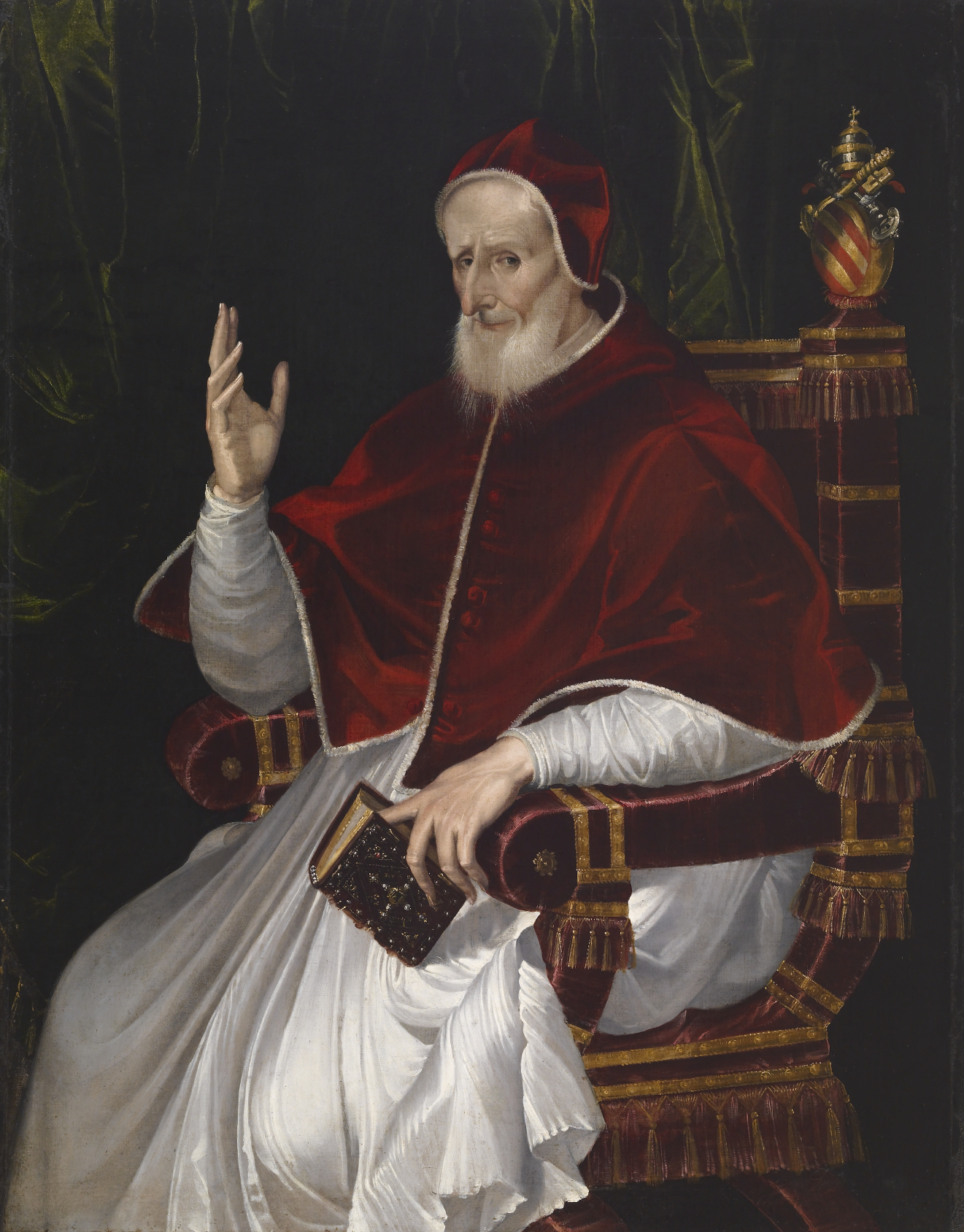
- Portrait by Bartolomeo Passarotti, 1566
- Church: Catholic Church
- Papacy began: 7 January 1566
- Papacy ended: 1 May 1572
- Predecessor: Pius IV
- Successor: Gregory XIII
- Previous posts: Bishop of Sutri and Nepi (1556–1557); Cardinal-Priest of Santa Maria sopra Minerva (1557–1561); Cardinal-Priest of Santa Sabina (1561–1566); Bishop of Mondovì (1560–1566); Secretary of the Supreme Sacred Congregation of the Roman and Universal Inquisition (1564–1566)

Orders
- Ordination: 1528 by Oliviero Carafa
- Consecration: 14 September 1556 by Giovanni Michele Saraceni
- Created cardinal: 15 March 1557 by Paul IV

Personal details
- Born: Antonio Ghislieri; 17 January 1504 Bosco Marengo, Duchy of Milan
- Died: 1 May 1572 (aged 68) Rome, Papal States
- Motto: Utinam dirigantur viae meae ad custodiendas justificationes tuas ("O that my ways may be directed to keep thy justifications")
- Signature: Pius V's signature

- Coat of arms: Pius V's coat of arms

Sainthood
- Feast day: 30 April; 5 May (pre-1969)
- Venerated in: Catholic Church
- Beatified: 1 May 1672; St. Peter's Basilica, Papal States by Pope Clement X
- Canonized: 22 May 1712; St. Peter's Basilica, Papal States by Pope Clement XI
- Attributes: Dominican habit; Papal vestments; Papal tiara; Crucifix; Book
- Patronage: Malta; Valletta, Bosco Marengo, Pietrelcina, Roccaforte Mondovì; Diocese of Alessandria Urbiztondo, Pangasinan

Papal styles of Pope Pius V
- Reference style: His Holiness
- Spoken style: Your Holiness
- Religious style: Holy Father
- Posthumous style: None

Pope Pius V, OP (Italian: Pio V; 17 January 1504 – 1 May 1572), born Antonio Ghislieri (and from 1518 called Michele Ghislieri), was head of the Catholic Church and leader of the Papal States from 7 January 1566 to his death, in May 1572.

He was an inquisitor and is venerated as a saint of the Catholic Church. He is chiefly notable for his role in the implementation of the Council of Trent, the Counter-Reformation, and the standardization of the Roman Rite within the Latin Church, known as the Tridentine Mass. Pius V declared Thomas Aquinas a Doctor of the Church.

As a cardinal, Ghislieri gained a reputation for putting orthodoxy before personalities, prosecuting eight French bishops for heresy. He also stood firm against nepotism, rebuking his predecessor Pope Pius IV to his face when he wanted to make a 13-year-old member of his family a cardinal and subsidize a nephew from the papal treasury.

By means of the papal bull of 1570, Regnans in Excelsis, Pius V excommunicated Elizabeth I of England for heresy and persecution of English Catholics during her reign. He also arranged the formation of the Holy League, an alliance of Catholic states to combat the advancement of the Ottoman Empire in Eastern Europe. Although outnumbered, the Holy League famously defeated the Ottomans at the Battle of Lepanto in 1571. Pius V attributed the victory to the intercession of the Blessed Virgin Mary and instituted the feast of Our Lady of Victory. Biographers report that as the Battle of Lepanto ended, Pius rose and went over to a window, where he stood gazing toward the East. "...[L]ooking at the sky, he cried out, 'A truce to business; our great task at present is to thank God for the victory which He has just given the Christian army'."

== Biography ==
=== Early life ===
Antonio Ghislieri was born 17 January 1504, to Paolo Ghislieri and Domenica Augeri, in Bosco in the Duchy of Milan (now Bosco Marengo in the province of Alessandria, Piedmont), Italy. At the age of fourteen he entered the Dominican Order, taking the name Michele, passing from the monastery of Voghera to that of Vigevano, and thence to Bologna. Ordained a priest at Genoa in 1528, he was sent by his order to Pavia, where he lectured for sixteen years. At Parma he advanced thirty propositions in support of the papacy against Protestantism.

Antonio became master of novices and was on several occasions elected prior of more than one Dominican priory. During a time of great moral laxity, he insisted on discipline, and strove to develop the practice of the monastic virtues. He fasted, did penance, passed long hours of the night in meditation and prayer, traveled on foot without a cloak in deep silence, or only speaking to his companions of the things of God. As his reformist zeal provoked resentment, he was compelled to return to Rome in 1550, where, after having been employed in several inquisitorial missions, he was appointed to the commissariat of the Holy Office.

In 1556 Antonio was made Bishop of Sutri by Pope Paul IV and was selected as inquisitor of the faith in Milan and Lombardy. In 1557 he was made a cardinal and named inquisitor general for all Christendom. His defense of Bartolomé Carranza, Archbishop of Toledo, who had been suspected of heresy by the Spanish Inquisition, earned him a reprimand from the pope.

Under Pope Pius IV (1559–65) he became Bishop of Mondovì in Piedmont. Frequently called to Rome, he displayed his unflinching zeal in all the questions on which he was consulted. Thus he offered opposition to Pius IV when the latter wished to make Ferdinand de' Medici, then only thirteen years old, a cardinal. His opposition to the pontiff led to his dismissal from the palace and limits being placed on his authority as inquisitor.

=== Papal election ===
Before Michele Ghislieri could return to his diocese, Pope Pius IV died. On 4 January, a courier from Spain arrived, prompting rumors that King Philip II favoured the election of Cardinal Ghislieri. This in turn gave additional momentum to the efforts of Cardinal Charles Borromeo and his allies, who already supported the candidacy of Ghislieri. As the cardinals conferred with each other more intensely, the number of those who looked to Ghislieri increased, and this led eventually to his election as the new pope on the afternoon of 8 January 1566. Ghislieri took the regnal name Pope Pius V. He was crowned ten days later, on his 62nd birthday, by the protodeacon.

Six weeks after the conclave, Cardinal Borromeo wrote to Cardinal Henry of Portugal recalling the election. He spoke of the new pope, and of his "high esteem for him on account of his singular holiness and zeal", seeing these qualities as a sign that he would make a good pope "to the great satisfaction of all".

== Pontificate ==
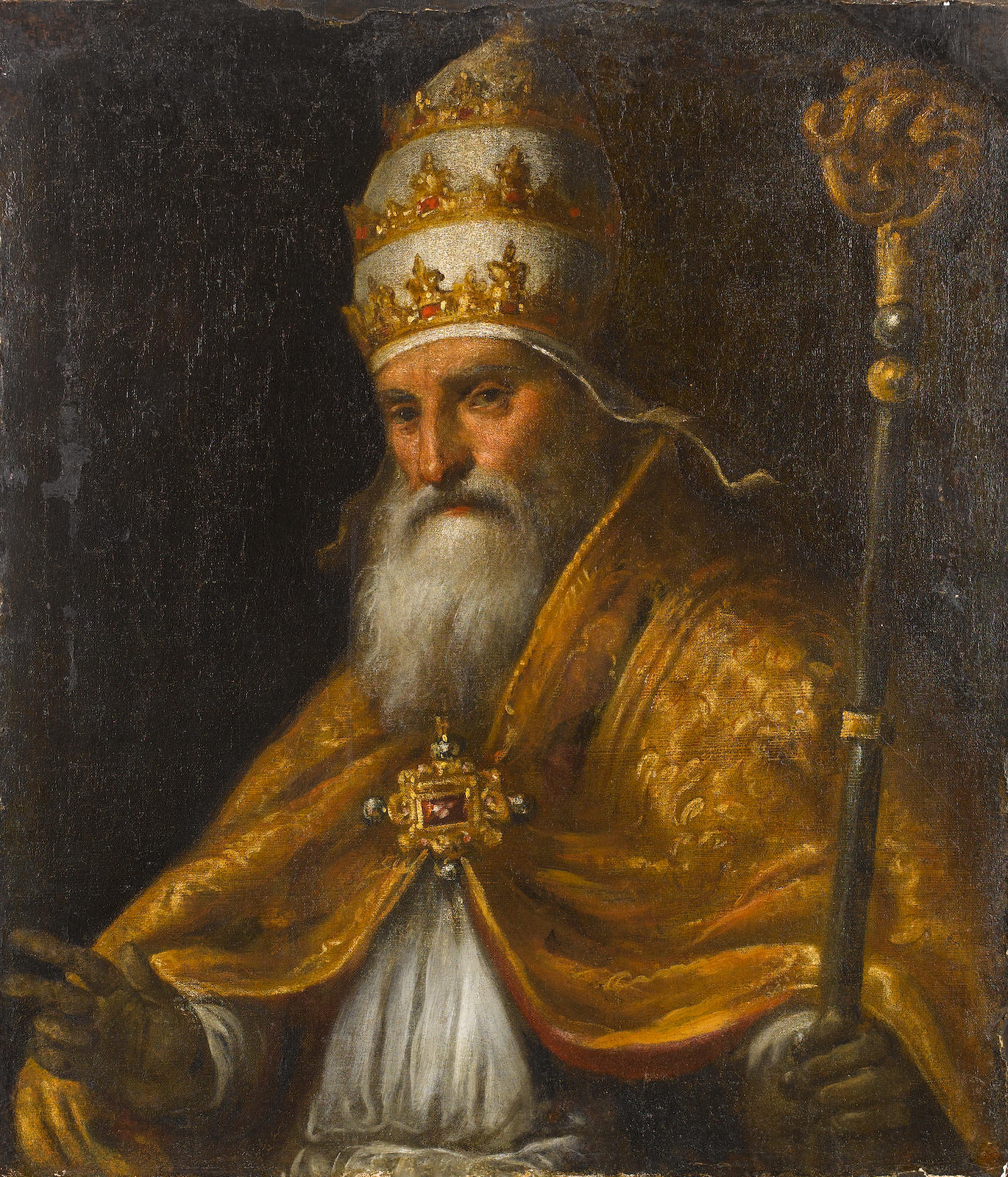
Portrait of Pius V by Palma il Giovane

His pontificate saw him deal with internal reform of the Church, the spread of Protestant doctrines in the West, and Turkish armies advancing from the East.

=== Church discipline ===
Aware of the necessity of restoring discipline and morality in Rome to ensure success, he at once proceeded to reduce the cost of the papal court after the manner of the Dominican Order to which he belonged, compel residence among the clergy, regulate inns, and assert the importance of the ceremonial in general and the liturgy of the Mass in particular.

In his wider policy, which was characterized throughout by an effective stringency, the maintenance and increase of the efficacy of the Inquisition and the enforcement of the canons and decrees of the Council of Trent had precedence over other considerations.

In March 1571, he created the Congregation of the Index to formalize the censorship of books deemed heretical or immoral.

=== Liturgy ===
Accordingly, to implement a decision of that council, he standardized the Mass by promulgating the 1570 edition of the Roman Missal. Pius V made this Missal mandatory throughout the Latin Church, except where a Mass liturgy dating from before 1370 was in use. This form of the Mass remained essentially unchanged for 400 years until Pope Paul VI's revision of the Roman Missal in 1969–70, after which it has become widely known as the Tridentine Mass.

=== Thomism ===
Pius V, who had declared Thomas Aquinas the fifth Latin Doctor of the Church in 1567, commissioned the first edition of Aquinas' opera omnia, often called the editio Piana in honor of the Pope. This work was produced in 1570 at the studium generale of the Dominican Order at Santa Maria sopra Minerva, which would be transformed into the College of Saint Thomas in 1577, and again into the Pontifical University of Saint Thomas Aquinas, Angelicum in the 20th century.

=== Holy League ===
Pius V arranged the forming of the Holy League against the Ottoman Empire, as the result of which the Battle of Lepanto (7 October 1571) was won by the combined fleet under Don John of Austria. It is attested in his canonisation that he miraculously knew when the battle was over, himself being in Rome at the time. Pius V also helped financially in the construction of Valletta, Malta's capital city, by sending his military engineer Francesco Laparelli to design the fortification walls (A bronze bust of Pius V was installed at the Gate of Valletta in 1892.) To commemorate the victory, he instituted the Feast of Our Lady of Victory.

=== Protestant Reformation ===
By the time Pius V ascended the throne, Protestantism had swept over all of England and Scotland, as well as half of Germany, the Netherlands, and parts of France; only Spain, Ireland, Portugal and Italy remained unswervingly Catholic. Pius V was thus determined to prevent its insurgency into Italy—which he believed would come via the Alps and Milan.

In the first year of his papacy, Pius urged Mary, Queen of Scots to restore Catholicism in her realm, providing funding and sending Jesuit Vincenzo Lauro to Scotland as Nuncio to further this cause. However, with Mary's Protestant half-brother James Stewart, Earl of Moray, back at the heart of government and her Catholic husband Henry Stuart, Lord Darnley, in disfavour, the political circumstances did not prove favourable.

==== Huguenots ====
Pius V recognized attacks on papal supremacy in the Catholic Church and was desirous of limiting their advancement. In France, where his influence was stronger, he took several measures to oppose the Protestant Huguenots. He directed the dismissal of Cardinal Odet de Coligny and seven bishops, nullified the royal edict tolerating the extramural services of the Reformers, introduced the Roman catechism, restored papal discipline, and strenuously opposed all compromise with the Huguenot nobility.

==== Elizabeth I ====
His response to Queen Elizabeth I of England assuming the position of Supreme Governor of the Church of England included support of the imprisoned Mary, Queen of Scots and her supporters in their attempts to rescue England "ex turpissima muliebris libidinis servitute" ("from a most sordid slavery to a woman's voracity"). A brief English Catholic uprising, the Rising of the North, had just failed. Pius then issued a papal bull, Regnans in Excelsis ("Reigning on High"), dated 27 April 1570, that declared Elizabeth I a heretic and released her subjects from their allegiance to her. It was the official decree of excommunication on her and it also declared an ipso facto excommunication on anyone who obeyed her. In response, Elizabeth now actively started persecuting English Catholics for treason.

=== Character and policy ===
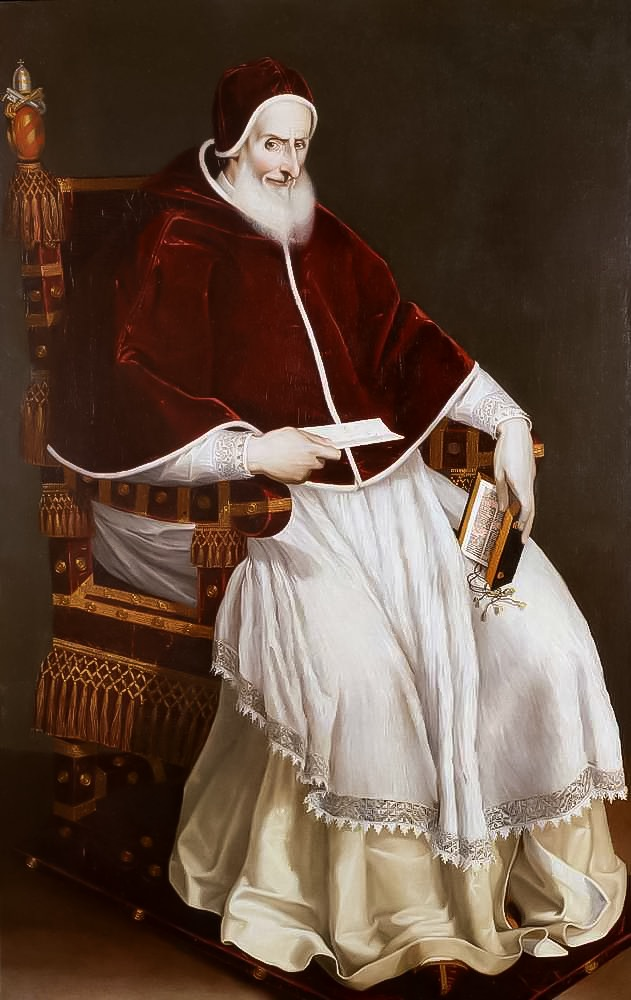
Portrait by Scipione Pulzone, c. 1572

As a young man, Michele Ghislieri was eager to join the Inquisition. Under Paul IV, he rose to Grand Inquisitor, and from there ascended to the papacy.

Upon election to the papacy as Pius V, Ghislieri immediately started to get rid of many of the extravagant luxuries then prevalent in the court. One of his first acts was to dismiss the papal court jester, and no subsequent pope had one. He forbade horse racing in St. Peter's Square. Severe sanctions were imposed against blasphemy, adultery, and sodomy. These laws quickly made Pius V the subject of Roman hatred; he was accused of trying to turn the city into a vast monastery. He was not a hypocrite: in day-to-day life Pius V was highly ascetic. He wore a hair shirt beneath the simple habit of a Dominican friar and was often seen in bare feet.

His governing efforts weren't entirely punitive: he planned distribution of alms to the poor, imported cheap grain in times of famine and cracked down on hired killers and brigands, what Michael Mullett calls a "programme of restoring Rome as the Church's ideal city." Katherine Rinne writes in Waters of Rome that Pius V ordered the construction of public works to improve the water supply and sewer system of the city—a welcome step, particularly in low-lying areas, where typhoid and malaria were inevitable summer visitors.

=== Papal bulls ===
In 1567, he issued Super prohibitione agitationis Taurorum & Ferarum prohibiting bull-fighting.

Besides In Coena Domini (1568), there are several others of note, including his prohibition of quaestuary (February 1567 and January 1570); condemnation of ideas associated with Michael Baius, a professor of Leuven (1567); reform of the Roman Breviary (July 1568); formal condemnation of homosexual behaviour (dirum nefas) by the clergy (1568); the banishment of the Jews from all ecclesiastical dominions except Rome and Ancona (1569); declaring the primacy of the Lateran over St. Peter's (1569); an injunction against use of the reformed missal (July 1570); the confirmation of the privileges of the Society of Crusaders for the protection of the Inquisition (October 1570); the suppression of the Fratres Humiliati (February 1571); the approbation of the new office of the Blessed Virgin (March 1571); and the enforcement of the daily recitation of the Canonical Hours (September 1571).

=== Papal garments ===
Pius V is often credited with the origin of the Pope's white garments, supposedly because after his election Pius continued to wear his white Dominican habit. However, many of his predecessors also wore white with a red mozzetta, as can be seen on many paintings where neither they nor Pius is wearing a cassock, but thin, wide, white garments.

An article by Agostino Paravicini Bagliani in L'Osservatore Romano of 31 August 2013 states that the earliest document that speaks explicitly of the Pope wearing white is the Ordo XIII, a book of ceremonies compiled c. 1274 under Pope Gregory X. From that date onward, the books of ceremonies speak ever more explicitly of the Pope as wearing a red mantle, mozzetta, camauro and shoes, and a white cassock and stockings.

=== Canonizations ===
Pius V canonized one saint during his reign: Ivo of Chartres on 18 December 1570.

=== Consistories ===
Pius V created 21 cardinals in three consistories, including Felice Piergentile who would become Pope Sixtus V.

== Death and canonization ==
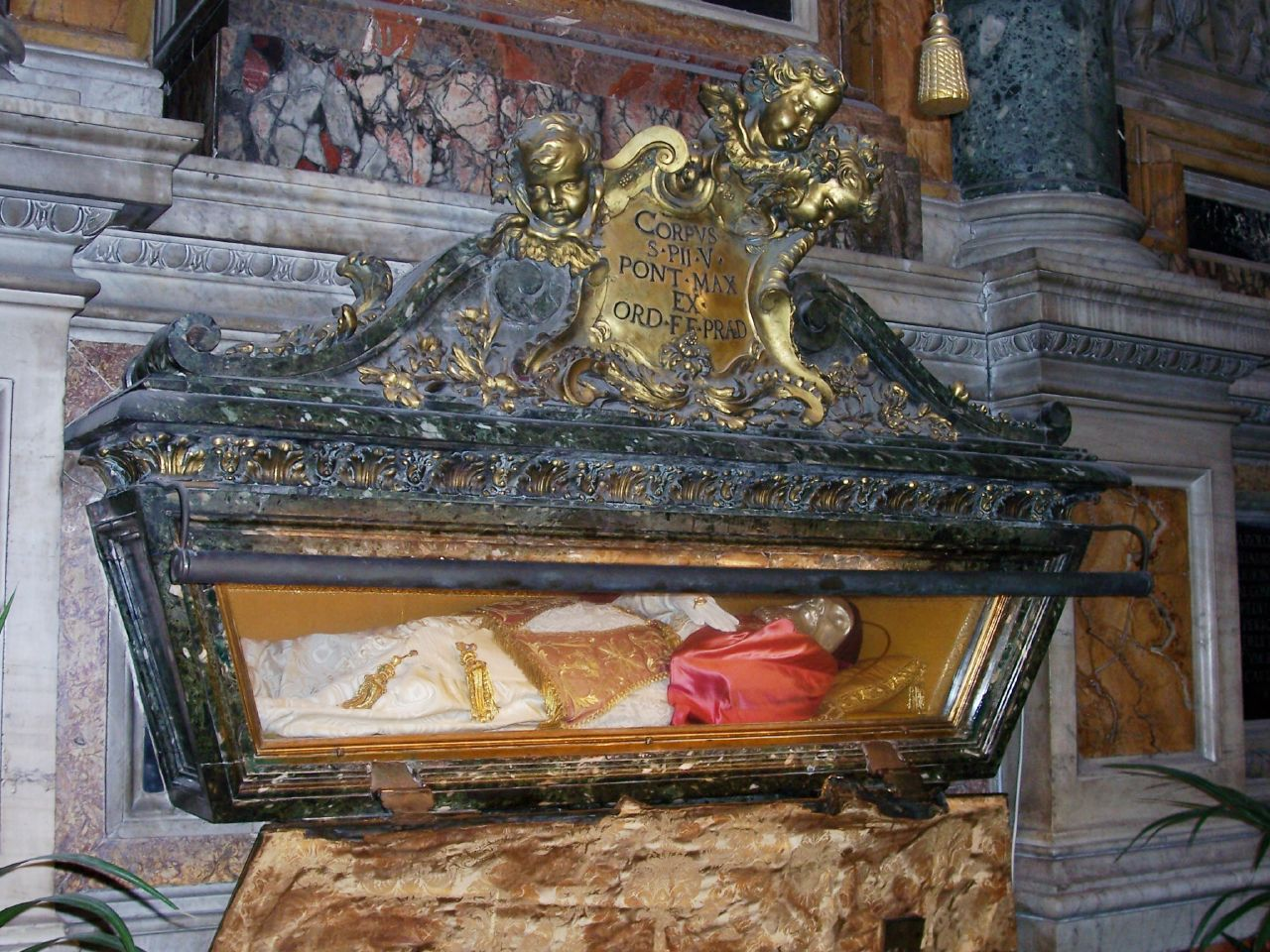
The body of Pius V in his tomb in Santa Maria Maggiore

Pius V died on 1 May 1572. Pius V suffered from bladder stones, a condition for which he was unwilling to have an operation. Additionally, Pius V fasted and served extensively in his last years, leading to "great weakness". After his death, three stones were discovered in his bladder. He was buried in the chapel of S. Andrea which was close to the tomb of Pope Pius III, in the Vatican. Although his will requested he be buried in Bosco, Pope Sixtus V built a monument in the chapel of SS. Sacramento in the Liberian basilica. His remains were transferred there on 9 January 1588.

In 1696, the process of Pius V's canonisation was started through the efforts of the Master of the Order of Preachers, Antonin Cloche. He also immediately commissioned a representative tomb from the sculptor Pierre Le Gros the Younger to be erected in the Sistine Chapel of the Basilica di Santa Maria Maggiore. The pope's body was placed in it in 1698. Pope Pius V was beatified by Pope Clement X in 1672, and was later canonized by Pope Clement XI (1700–21) on 22 May 1712.

In the following year, 1713, his feast day was inserted in the General Roman Calendar, for celebration on 5 May, with the rank of "Double", the equivalent of "Third-Class Feast" in the General Roman Calendar of 1960, and of its present rank of "Memorial". In 1969 the celebration was moved to 30 April, the day before the anniversary of his death (1 May).

Cardinal John Henry Newman declared that "St. Pius V was stern and severe, as far as a heart burning and melted with divine love could be so ... Yet such energy and vigour as his were necessary for the times. He was a soldier of Christ in a time of insurrection and rebellion, when in a spiritual sense, martial law was proclaimed."

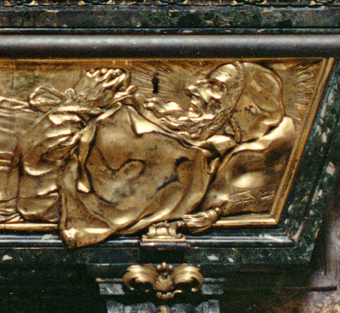
Portrait of Pius V by Pierre Le Gros on the tomb

The front of his tomb has a lid of gilded bronze which shows a likeness of the dead pope. Most of the time this is left open to allow the veneration of the saint's relics.

== See also ==
- Cardinals created by Pius V
- List of popes
- List of Catholic saints
- Pope Saint Pius V, patron saint archive

== Sources ==
- Long, Pamela O. (2018). Engineering the Eternal City: Infrastructure, Topography, and the Culture of Knowledge in Late Sixteenth-Century Rome. University of Chicago Press. ISBN 9780226591285.

Catholic Church titles
Preceded by Pius IV	Pope; 7 January 1566 – 1 May 1572	Succeeded by Gregory XIII
