= Francisco de Cosío y Otero =

Most Reverend Francisco de Cosío y Otero
- Archbishop of Santafé en Nueva Granada
- Church: Catholic Church
- Archdiocese: Archdiocese of Santafé en Nueva Granada
- In office: 1704–1715
- Predecessor: Ignacio de Urbina
- Successor: Francisco del Rincón

Orders
- Consecration: 6 April 1704 by Pedro Portocarrero y Guzmán

Personal details
- Born: 12 April 1640 Turieno, Spain
- Died: 29 November 1715 (aged 75) Bogotá, Colombia

Francisco de Cosío y Otero (12 April 1640 – 29 November 1715) was a Roman Catholic prelate who served as Archbishop of Santafé en Nueva Granada (1704–1715).

== Biography ==
Francisco de Cosío y Otero was born in Turieno, Spain on 12 April 1640.

On 14 January 1704, he was appointed during the papacy of Pope Clement XI as Archbishop of Santafé en Nueva Granada. On 6 April 1704, he was consecrated bishop by Pedro Portocarrero y Guzmán, Patriarch of West Indies, with Benito Madueño y Ramos, Titular Bishop of Sion and Atanasio Esterriga Trajanáuregui, Titular Bishop of Lycopolis, serving as co-consecrators.

He served as Archbishop of Santafé en Nueva Granada until his death on 29 November 1715.

While bishop, he was the principal co-consecrator of Jerónimo Nosti de Valdés, Bishop of Puerto Rico (1704).

== External links and additional sources ==
- Cheney, David M. "Archdiocese of Bogotá". Catholic-Hierarchy.org. (for Chronology of Bishops) ^{[self-published]}
- Chow, Gabriel. "Metropolitan Archdiocese of Bogotá (Colombia)". GCatholic.org. (for Chronology of Bishops) ^{[self-published]}

Catholic Church titles
Preceded by Ignacio de Urbina	Archbishop of Santafé en Nueva Granada; 1704–1715	Succeeded by Francisco del Rincón
