= Francisco Mendigaña y Armendáriz =

Spanish-born prelate

The Most Reverend Francisco Mendigaña y Armendáriz
- Archbishop of Santo Domingo
- Church: Roman Catholic Church
- Archdiocese: Santo Domingo
- Appointed: 8 April 1726
- Term ended: 30 October 1728
- Predecessor: Antonio Claudio Alvarez de Quiñones
- Successor: Juan de Galavís, O. Praem

Personal details
- Born: 17 May 1674 Astráin, Navarre, Spain
- Died: 30 October 1728 (aged 54) Machetá, Viceroyalty of New Granada or Santo Domingo

Francisco Mendigaña y Armendáriz (17 May 1674 – 30 October 1728) or Francisco Mendigaño Armendáriz was a Spanish-born prelate of the Roman Catholic Church. Born in Navarre, he moved to New Granada as an adult, serving in leadership positions in the Archdiocese of Bogotá. Following Archbishop Francisco del Rincón's death in 1723, he became the diocesan administrator of the archdiocese, and was appointed Archbishop of Santo Domingo in April 1726. He remained in Bogotá until 1727 or 1728, when he left for his new position in Santo Domingo, but he died along the way in 1728.

== Biography ==
=== Early life and education ===
Mendigaña y Armendáriz was born on 17 May 1674 in the village of Astráin, Navarre, Spain. His parents were Juan Mendigaña and Graciosa Armendáriz, and he had one sister, María Catharina. For secondary school, he attended the Colegio Mayor de San Ildefonso in Alcalá de Henares, Spain. In his youth, he once traveled to the Viceroyalty of New Granada, but returned to Spain.

=== Priesthood and episcopacy ===
Mendigaña returned to New Granada as an adult, this time permanently. He settled in Bogotá where he spent much of his priestly career, serving in the Roman Catholic Archdiocese of Santafé en Nueva Granada (now the Archdiocese of Bogotá). By 1717, at the time of the death of Archbishop Francisco Otero y Cossío, Mendigaña was serving as treasurer of the archdiocese.

On 28 June 1723, Archbishop Francisco del Rincón, died of illness. Antonio Claudio Álvarez de Quiñones was appointed Archbishop of Santafé en Nueva Granada on 29 January 1725 in a papal bull by Pope Benedict XIII. However, he did actually take reach the archdiocese until 1731, due to an extended illness and travels to Europe. Following Rincón's death, Mendigaña, who had been previously the archdeacon, became diocesan administrator of the archdiocese.

On 8 April 1726, Mendigaña was appointed Archbishop of Santo Domingo by Pope Benedict XIII. He remained in Bogotá in the meanwhile, continuing to serve as diocesan administrator while he awaited Álvarez de Quiñones' arrival so that he could consecrate him as bishop before he left for Santo Domingo. However, when Álvarez de Quiñones did not arrive, in 1727 or 1728 Mendigaña departed Bogotá for Santo Domingo, around two years after being appointed archbishop. His successor as diocesan administrator was Nicolás de Barasorda y Larrazabal. Meanwhile, while traveling to Santo Domingo, Mendigaña died along the way, on 30 October 1728 in the town of Machetá in what is now Colombia.

== Bibliography ==
- Cheney, David M. "Archdiocese of Santo Domingo". Catholic-Hierarchy.org. (for Chronology of Bishops) ^{[self-published]}
- Chow, Gabriel. "Metropolitan Archdiocese of Santo Domingo". GCatholic.org. (for Chronology of Bishops) ^{[self-published]}

Catholic Church titles
Preceded by Antonio Claudio Alvarez de Quiñones	Archbishop of Santo Domingo; 1726–1728	Succeeded by Juan de Galabis
