= Antonio Claudio Álvarez de Quiñones =

Spanish-born prelate of the Roman Catholic Church

The Most Reverend Antonio Claudio Álvarez de Quiñones
- Archbishop of Santafé en Nueva Granada
- Church: Roman Catholic Church
- Archdiocese: Santafé en Nueva Granada
- Province: Santafé en Nueva Granada
- Appointed: 29 January 1725 by Pope Benedict XIII
- Predecessor: Francisco del Rincón, OM
- Successor: Juan de Galavís, O. Praem
- Previous posts: Archbishop of Santo Domingo (1717–1725)

Orders
- Consecration: 1 May 1718 by Jerónimo Nosti de Valdés, OS Bas.

Personal details
- Born: 1674 Alcalá de Henares, Spain
- Died: 21 October 1736 (aged 61–62) Bogotá, Viceroyalty of New Granada
- Residence: Bogotá, Viceroyalty of New Granada
- Education: Colegio Mayor de San Ildefonso (BA; JCL)

Antonio Claudio Álvarez de Quiñones (1670s – 21 October 1736) was a Spanish-born prelate of the Roman Catholic Church in what is now the Dominican Republic and Colombia.

Born in Alcalá de Henares, he taught law before becoming vicar general of the Diocese of Sigüenza. He was appointed Archbishop of Santo Domingo in 1717, serving until 1725, when he was appointed Archbishop of Santafé en Nueva Granada (now the Archdiocese of Bogotá). Due to illness, he was unable to take control of the archdiocese until 1731, and he served as archbishop after that until his death in 1736.

== Biography ==
=== Early life and education ===
Álvarez de Quiñones was born in Alcalá de Henares, Spain. His exact date of birth is disputed, with different sources placing the year at 1666, 1674, 1676, and 1687. However, Quiñones' Licentiate of Canon Law certificate is dated at 1700, and because most people at that time would have received that degree at age 26, 1674 is perhaps the closest estimate to his actual birth year.

Álvarez de Quiñones was the son of Antonio Quiñones and Catalina García. His father's ancestors came from Quintanilla, in the Diocese of León, and his paternal grandparents came from the villages of Santorcaz and Hontanar. His mother's ancestors were "old Christians," without any Jewish or Moorish ancestry, and none were "punished by the Holy Inquisition."

Álvarez de Quiñones attended the Colegio Mayor de San Ildefonso in Alcalá de Henares, graduating on 5 June 1674 with a bachelor's degree and a Licentiate of Canon Law.

=== Priesthood ===
Following graduation, he obtained a chair of law at the college. He remained there teaching for several years, when he was invited by his uncle Francisco Álvarez de Quiñones, the canon priest of the Collegiate of Santa María del Mercado in Berlanga de Duero and the future Bishop of Sigüenza, invited him to come work with him. Álvarez de Quiñones accepted the offer, and became the Vicar General of the Diocese of Sigüenza.

=== Archbishop of Santo Domingo ===
In September 1711, Francisco del Rincón, the Archbishop of Santo Domingo, transferred to administer the Archdiocese of Caracas in what is now Venezuela, leaving the archdiocese without an archbishop. On 10 March 1712, by way of royal appointment, Álvarez de Quiñones was appointed diocesan administrator, arriving in November of that year. Finally, on 12 April 1717, Pope Clement XI appointed him Archbishop of Santo Domingo. He traveled to Havana, Cuba, in April 1718, for his episcopal consecration, which took place on 1 May 1718, with Bishop Jerónimo Nosti de Valdés, OS Bas., the Bishop of Santiago de Cuba, serving as consecrator. However, following his consecration, he was unable to immediately return to Santo Domingo because he was suffering from herpes.

As archbishop, one of Álvarez de Quiñones' notable policies was that of refusing to ordain . In 1723, he became outraged upon learning that his predecessor, Francisco del Rincón, had ordained pardos (triracial descendants of Europeans, Native Americans, and West Africans). He complained that some of the archdiocese's priests "have a good part of mulatto" and made the accusation that they had "hidden" that their "progenitors had been slaves, and descendants of blacks that were introduced into this island from Guinea." He then ordered that in the future, all priests should have the proper "quality and qualifications."

=== Archbishop of Bogotá ===
On 28 June 1723, the Archbishop of Santafé en Nueva Granada (now the Archdiocese of Bogotá), Francisco del Rincón, died of illness. On 29 January 1725, Álvarez de Quiñones was named his successor, with the appointment being communicated to him by Cardinal Francesco Acquaviva. His successor as Archbishop of Santo Domingo was Francisco Mendigaño Armendáriz, one of Álvarez de Quiñones' former classmates at San Ildefonso who was previously the archdeacon of the Bogotá Cathedral.

Álvarez de Quiñones was announced to be the next Archbishop of Santafé en Nueva Granada on 14 July 1724, and was officially appointed Archbishop of Santafé en Nueva Granada on 29 January 1725 in a papal bull by Pope Benedict XIII. However, he did actually take reach the archdiocese until 1731, due to an extended illness and travels to Europe. He suffered again from herpes, and was seriously ill for over five months. He wrote in an April 1724 letter that he could not make the trip to Bogotá because "it has been God who has served to cut me off with a grievous accident, of which I have been prostrate for five months in bed, in danger of losing my life." He wrote that he would travel when the doctors allowed it. He left Santo Domingo in September 1725. Later, in July 1728, he traveled to Gibraltar on a pastoral visit, where he remained until early 1729. Meanwhile, Francisco Menigaña Armendáriz, who had remained in Bogotá as the diocesan administrator, had fallen ill and died in September 1728, and was replaced as diocesan administrator by Nicolas de Barasorda y Larrazabal, and later by Francisco José Cabrera y Davales. Álvarez de Quiñones finally arrived in Bogotá on 27 August 1731.

Throughout his tenure as archbishop, Álvarez de Quiñones received mixed reception from those within the diocese, and experienced opposition from some members of the clergy, who accused the archbishop of extravagant spending. In 1732, several priests formally complained to King Philip V of Spain "for the great excesses in relation to the excessive money he holds and other irregular things with the state." However, others praised Álvarez de Quiñones for his "regal magnificence" and the wealth he brought to the archdiocese, which allowed for the endowment of scholarships, increased funding for churches and shrines, and the renovation of the Bogotá Cathedral, the purchase of a new episcopal palace, which was acquired in 1733.

=== Death ===
Álvarez de Quiñones died in Bogotá on 21 October 1736. He left a large estate, including the episcopal palace and a number of black slaves, and his successor as archbishop, Juan de Galavís, spent much of his short term as archbishop consolidating his will, which had 226 pages with 452 individual sections. In his will, he left "generous donations" to a variety of institutions.

== Episcopal consecration ==
- Cardinal Guillaume d'Estouteville, OSB
- Pope Sixtus IV (1471)
- Pope Julius II (1481)
- Cardinal Raffaele Riario (1504)
- Pope Leo X (1513)
- Cardinal Alessandro Farnese (1519)
- Cardinal Francesco Pisani (1527)
- Cardinal Alfonso Gesualdo (1564)
- Pope Clement VIII (1592)
- Cardinal Pietro Aldobrandini (1604)
- Bishop Laudivio Zacchia (1605)
- Cardinal Antonio Barberini, OFM Cap (1625)
- Cardinal Marco Antonio Franciotti (1637)
- Cardinal Giambattista Spada (1643)
- Cardinal Carlo Pio di Savoia (1655)
- Archbishop Jaime de Palafox y Cardona (1677)
- Cardinal Luis Manuel Fernández de Portocarrero (1678)
- Patriarch Pedro Portocarrero y Guzmán (1691)
- Bishop Jerónimo Nosti de Valdés, OS Bas. (1704)
- Archbishop Antonio Claudio Álvarez de Quiñones (1718)
