= Juan de Galavís =

Spanish Premonstratensian canon regular and prelate

The Most Reverend Juan de Galavís, OPraem
- Archbishop of Santafé en Nueva Granada
- Church: Roman Catholic Church
- Archdiocese: Santafé en Nueva Granada
- Appointed: 17 December 1737 by Philip V of Spain
- Installed: 29 July 1739
- Term ended: 14 November 1739
- Predecessor: Antonio Claudio Álvarez de Quiñones
- Successor: Diego Fermín de Vergara, OSA
- Previous post: Archbishop of Santo Domingo (1729–37)

Orders
- Ordination: 1723
- Consecration: April 1731 by Sebastián Lorenzo Pizarro, OSBas

Personal details
- Born: 13 May 1683 Robledillo de Gata, Extremadura, Spain
- Died: 14 November 1739 (aged 56) Bogotá, Viceroyalty of New Granada
- Parents: Juan Pérez Galavis; Catalina Mendez

Juan de Galavís y Mendez, OPraem (29 January 1683 – 14 November 1739) was a Spanish Premonstratensian canon regular and a prelate of the Catholic Church in what is now the Dominican Republic and Colombia. He served as Archbishop of Santo Domingo from 1731 to 1737 and as Archbishop of Bogotá from 1737 to 1739. He is the brother and uncle of two mayors of Bogotá, Pedro Galavís y Mendez and Eustaquio Galavís y Hurtado, respectively.

Galavís was born in Robledillo de Gata, Extremadura. He became abbot of his monastery and superior general of the Spanish congregation of the Premonstratensians. He went on to serve as rector of a school in Salamanca and a professor of theology at the University of Salamanca. In September 1729, he was selected by King Philip V to be Archbishop of Santo Domingo. His appointment was confirmed later that year by Pope Benedict XIII and he was consecrated in April 1731. He remained in Santo Domingo until 1737, when he was selected to be the next Archbishop of Santafé en Nueva Granada. He arrived in Bogotá on 29 July 1739 to take possession of the archdiocese, but died a few months later.

== Early life and family ==
Galavís was born on 29 January 1683 in Robledillo de Gata, Extremadura, Spain. His parents were Juan Pérez Galavís and Catalina Mendez. He had one brother, Pedro Galavís y Mendez, who went on to serve as Mayor of Bogotá. His nephew, Pedro's son, Eustaquio Galavís y Hurtado, also became Mayor of Bogotá, serving two nonconsecutive terms in the 1780s and 1790s.

== Priesthood ==
Galavís studied in Ávila, Spain. He made his final vows as a Premonstratensian priest in 1723, also called the Norbertines, and became a canon regular. He was elected abbot of Espíritu Santo in 1720, serving until 1723. From 1723 to 1726, he was Superior General of the Spanish Congregation of Premonstratensians. From 1726 to 1729, he was simultaneously the 55th rector of Colegio San Norberto in Salamanca, León, and a professor of theology and Scripture at the University of Salamanca.

== Episcopacy ==
=== Archbishop of Santo Domingo ===
On 17 September 1729, Galavís was selected by King Philip V of Spain as the next Archbishop of Santo Domingo, following the death of Archbishop Francisco Mendigaña y Armendáriz. His selection was confirmed on 28 November 1729 by Pope Benedict XIII. His episcopal consecration took place in April 1731 at the Church of Santa María de la Caridad in Ciudad Rodrigo, Spain. His consecrator was Sebastián Lorenzo Pizarro, OSBas, the Bishop of Puerto Rico. He served as archbishop until 1738.

=== Archbishop of Santafé ===
On 17 December 1737 Galavís was selected to be Archbishop of Santafé en Nueva Granada (now the Archdiocese of Bogotá), after the death of Archbishop Antonio Claudio Álvarez de Quiñones. His selection was confirmed by Pope Clement XII on 3 March 1738. He finally entered Bogotá on 29 July 1939 to take possession of the archdiocese. He died in Bogotá on 14 November 1739, aged 56.

== Episcopal lineage ==
- Cardinal Scipione Rebiba
- Cardinal Giulio Antonio Santorio (1566)
- Cardinal Girolamo Bernerio, OP (1586)
- Archbishop Galeazzo Sanvitale (1604)
- Cardinal Ludovico Ludovisi (1621)
- Cardinal Luigi Caetani (1622)
- Cardinal Ulderico Carpegna (1630)
- Cardinal Paluzzo Paluzzi Altieri degli Albertoni (1666)
- Cardinal Gaspare Carpegna (1670)
- Cardinal Fabrizio Paolucci (1685)
- Archbishop José Gasch, OM (1703)
- Cardinal Francesco del Giudice (1704)
- Bishop Juan de Camargo y Angulo (1716)
- Bishop Sebastián Lorenzo Pizarro, OSBas (1728)
- Archbishop Juan de Galavís, OPraem (1731)
