= San Lorenzo in Panisperna =

Chiesa di San Lorenzo in Panisperna
- Church of St. Lawrence in Panisperna (in English); S. Laurentii in Panisperna (in Latin)
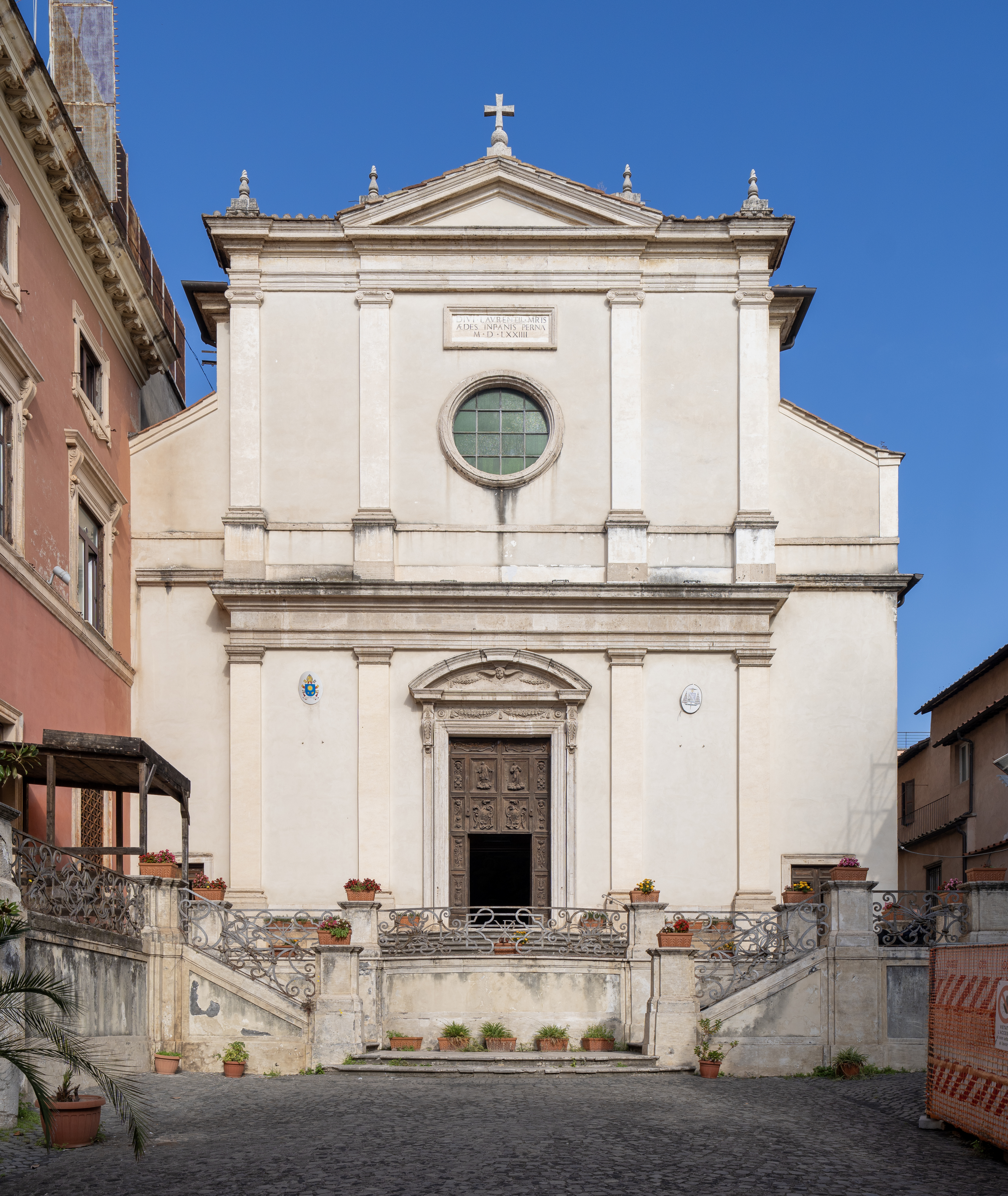
- Façade
- Click on the map for a fullscreen view
- 41°53′50.08″N 12°29′35.35″E
- Location: Via Panisperna 90, Rome
- Country: Italy
- Denomination: Roman Catholic
- Tradition: Roman Rite

History
- Status: Titular church
- Dedication: Saint Lawrence

Architecture
- Architect: Carlo Rainaldi
- Architectural type: Church

Administration
- District: Lazio
- Province: Rome

The church of San Lorenzo in Panisperna is a Roman Catholic church on Via Panisperna, Rome, central Italy. It was previously known as "San Lorenzo in Formoso". It was erected on the site of its dedicatee's martyrdom. It is one of several churches in Rome dedicated to him.

== Name ==
"Panisperna" most probably refers to the tradition of the Poor Clares of the adjacent convent distributing bread and ham, "panis et perna" in Latin on 10 August, the Feast of St. Lawrence. This is in remembrance of his distribution of funds of the Church to the poor. The previous name of the church "in Formoso" referred to Pope Formosus, who erected the first attested church on its site.

== History ==
Tradition states that the first edifice on the site was constructed during the reign of Emperor Constantine I, about 100 years after the martyrdom of St. Lawrence. In the fifth century, this church was one of the Stational Churches of Rome that the Pope visited on its titular day: the Thursday of the first week in Lent. Recent popes have revived this ancient custom.

The first written evidence of an ecclesiastical edifice on the site is from 1300, when Pope Boniface VIII rebuilt the church and annexed an abbey to it. That abbey was given to the Benedictines in 1451 and later hosted the Poor Clares. They were removed in February 1872 as part of confiscations by the new Italian government. The Poor Clares returned in 1896, aided by the efforts of Cardinal Jacopo Colonna. He also restored the church and abbey. The Franciscans presently serve the church.

The present church is the result of a rebuilding by Carlo Rainaldi in 1575-6 under Pope Gregory XIII. At this time it became denominated "in Panisperna", rather than "in Formoso". The facade constructed then survives.

A new, outer portico was added in the 17th century. It was restored and decorated with images of St. Lawrence and St. Francis of Assisi in 1893-4 by Pope Leo XIII. In 1843 he had been ordained bishop in that church. Pope Leo XIII also constructed a steep flight of steps in front of the church that led to a tree-lined courtyard. A modern, bronze statue of St. Bridget of Sweden adorns this courtyard.

A medieval house is preserved adjacent to the church. It has an exterior staircase and is an example of one of the few such houses to be preserved in Rome.

== Interiors ==
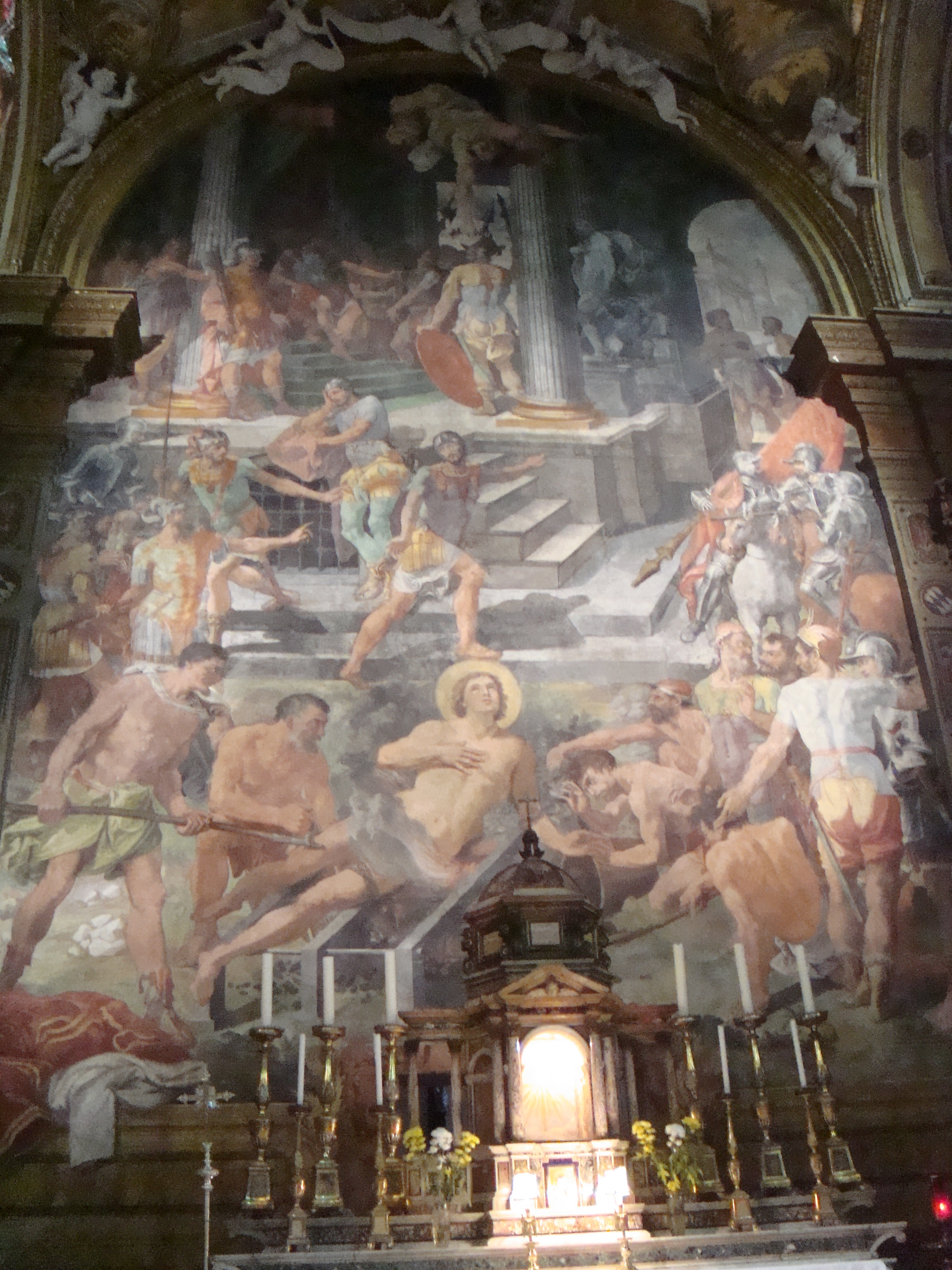
Martyrdom of St Lawrence by Pasquale Cati.

The church has a single nave with three chapels on each side.

A late 16th-century fresco of the Matryrdom of St. Lawrence serves as the reredos of the high altar and was painted by Pasquale Cati, a pupil of Michelangelo. The crucifix of the high altar is from the 14th century.

The south side includes a painting of St. Clare of Assisi by Antonio Nessi (1756); a ceiling fresco of the Glory of St. Lawrence by Antonio Bicchierai; the tomb of the brothers St. Crispin and St. Crispinianus, with a painting by Giovanni Francesco Romano; and a painting of the Immaculate Conception by Giuseppe Ranucci.

The north side includes the Stigmata of St. Francis by Niccolò Lapiccola; an 18th-century crucifix of the Roman school; and the chapel of St. Bridget of Sweden, in which she was buried before her body was translated to Sweden. St. Bridget used to beg for alms for the poor outside the church and prayed before the crucifix by its high altar. Presently, a martyr named Victoria is interred underneath the altar of the chapel. The painting of "St. Bridget Praying before the Crucifix" is by Giuseppe Montesanti (1757).

Under the porch of the church is a chapel containing the oven that is believed to have been that used for the martyrdom of St. Lawrence.

== List of Cardinal Protectors ==
- Michael Michai Kitbunchu (1983.02.02 - present)
- Antonio Caggiano (1946.02.22 – 1979.10.23)
- Ermenegildo Pellegrinetti (1937.12.16 – 1943.03.29)
- Eustaquio Ilundain y Esteban (1925.12.17 – 1937.08.10)
- Giulio Boschi (1901.04.18 – 1919.07.03)
- Sebastiano Galeati (1890.06.26 – 1901.01.25)
- Ruggero Luigi Emidio Antici Mattei (1876.01.28 – 1883.04.21)
- Luigi Bilio, B. (1866.06.25 – 1873.12.22)
- Johannes von Geissel (1857.03.19 – 1864.09.08)
- Lorenzo Simonetti (1846.01.19 – 1855.01.09)
- Luigi Del Drago (1832.12.17 – 1845.04.28)
- Pietro Gravina (1817.11.15 – 1830.12.06)
- Valentino Mastrozzi (1801.07.20 – 1809.05.13)
- Giovanni Battista Bussi de Pretis (1794.09.12 – 1800.06.27)
- Buenaventura Fernández de Córdoba Spínola (1769.06.26 – 1777.05.06)
- Giovanni Vincenzo Antonio Ganganelli, O.F.M. Conv. (later Pope Clement XIV) (1759.11.19 – 1762.03.29)
- Johann Theodor Herzog von Bayern (Jean-Théodore de Bavière) (1746.04.27 – 1759.02.12)
- Giorgio Doria (1744.03.16 – 1745.12.15)
- Vincenzo Bichi (1737.12.16 – 1740.08.29)
- Pier Luigi Carafa (1728.11.15 – 1737.12.16)
- Lorenzo Cozza, O.F.M. Obs. (1726.12.16 – 1727.01.20)
- Giulio Piazza (1714.04.16 – 1726.04.23)
- Tommaso Ruffo (1706.06.25 – 1709.01.28)
- Giambattista Rubini (1690.04.10 – 1706.06.25)
- Orazio Mattei (1686.09.30 – 1688.01.18)
- Emmanuel-Théodose de la Tour d'Auvergne de Bouillon (1670.05.19 – 1676.10.19)
- Stefano Durazzo (1634.01.09 – 1666.10.11)
- Fabrizio Verospi (1627.10.20 – 1633.09.05)
- Eitel Friedrich von Zollern-Sigmaringen (1621.12.15 – 1625.09.19)
- Felice Centini, O.F.M. Conv. (1613.08.12 – 1621.03.03)
- Decio Carafa (1612.05.07 – 1612.06.18)
- Lorenzo Bianchetti (1596.06.21 – 1612.03.12)
- Agostino Cusani (1591.01.14 – 1595.08.30)
- Domenico Pinelli (1586.01.15 – 1591.01.14)
- Guglielmo Sirleto (1565.05.15 – 1565.10.26 pro illa vice Deaconry, 1565.10.26 – 1585.10.06)
- Stanisław Hozjusz (1561.08.08 – 1562.08.31)
- Domenico Giacobazzi (1517.07.06 – 1517.07.10, 1517.07.10 – 1528 in commendam
