= Domingo Valentín Guerra Arteaga y Leiva =

18th-century Catholic Archbishop

Bishop of Segovia
- In office 8 March 1728 – 29 May 1742

Personal details
- Born: 14 February 1660
- Died: 29 May 1742 (aged 82)

Domingo Valentín Guerra Arteaga y Leiva (or Leiba; 14 February 1660 – 29 May 1742) was an 18th-century Catholic Archbishop, the queen's confessor and the Bishop of Segovia in Spain.

== Early years ==
Domingo Valentín Guerra Arteaga y Leiva was born on 14 February 1660 in Ariano Irpino, Italy, near Benevento. At the time the territory belonged to Spain, and his parents were Spanish. His father was Diego de Guerra y Varela, Maestre de Campo in the Spanish army, governor of the fortress of Gaeta in Naples, a native of Espera in the Archdiocese of Seville. His mother was Magdalena Modesta Arteaga y Leiva, a native of Naples. He was the third of three sons. The second, Miguel Francisco de Guerra y Arteaga, was a member of the Council of Castile and a Councilor of State during the reign of Philip V of Spain. Domingo Valentín grew up in Italy, where he was educated and became fluent in several languages. He remained in Italy for the first part of his life. He was aged 46 when he took orders.

== Church career ==
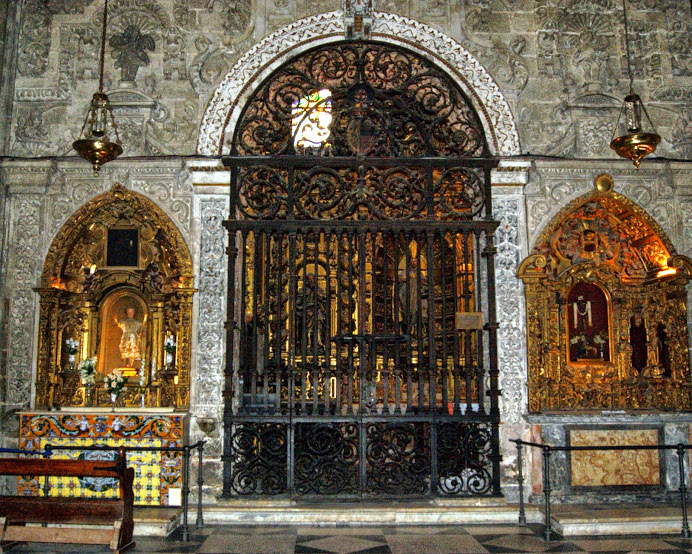
Baroque facade of the chapel of San Leandro in Seville Cathedral, made in 1733 at the expense of Domingo Valentín Guerra Arteaga y Leiva

Domingo Valentín was ordained a priest on 4 August 1706. In 1708 he obtained a doctorate in law in Rome. On 26 January 1711, while in Rome, he was granted the benefits of dean and canon in Segovia Cathedral. In 1714 he was unexpectedly appointed confessor to Queen Elisabeth Farnese, second wife of King Philip V of Spain. He joined the Spanish court, where he stayed for the remainder of his life. His duties as the queen's confessor meant he was unable to perform his duties in the cathedral of Segovia. In 1715 Pope Clement XI agreed to exempt him from the requirement to live in Segovia.

In 1724 Pope Benedict XIII gave Philip V permission to build a collegiate church dedicated to the Holy Trinity in the Royal Palace of La Granja de San Ildefonso. Philip V made Domingo the first abbot of the college in 1725. To take the position he had to renounce his benefits of dean and canon in Segovia Cathedral. Philip V also obtained Domingo's appointment as Archbishop of Amida in partibus, which gave him greater status at court. Domingo Valentín was appointed Titular Archbishop of Amida on 31 December 1725, and was ordained bishop on 31 March 1726. His principal consecrator was Cardinal Carlos de Borja y Centellas, Patriarch of the West Indies. His principal co-consecrators were bishops Benito Madueño y Ramos and Dionisio Francisco Mellado Eguíluz.

Baltasar de Mendoza y Sandoval, Bishop of Segovia, died on 4 November 1727. Philip V presented Domingo Valentín as his candidate for the new bishop. He was appointed Bishop of Segovia on 8 March 1728. On 16 April 1728 an attorney took possession of the seat of the diocese in his name. He could not come in person due to his court duties as the queen's confessor. Instead he appointed José Francisco Magdaleno as governor of the diocese, responsible for day-to-day administration, who was elevated to Bishop of Teos in partibus. Domingo Valentín was the principal consecrator of Cardinal Álvaro Eugenio de Mendoza Caamaño y Sotomayor (1734). He died on 29 May 1742. He was succeeded as Bishop of Segova by Diego García de Medrano, who was appointed on 24 September 1742.

== Lineage ==
Domingo Valentín's episcopal lineage, or apostolic succession was:

- Cardinal Carlos de Borja y Centellas (1705)
- Archbishop Francesco Acquaviva (1697)
- Cardinal Gaspare Carpegna (1670)
- Cardinal Paluzzo Paluzzi Altieri degli Albertoni (1666)
- Cardinal Ulderico Carpegna (1630)
- Cardinal Luigi Caetani (1622)
- Cardinal Ludovico Ludovisi (1621)
- Archbishop Galeazzo Sanvitale (1604)
- Cardinal Girolamo Bernerio, (1586)
- Cardinal Giulio Antonio Santorio (1566)
- Cardinal Scipione Rebiba

== Sources ==
- Bartolomé Herrero, Bonifacio (2018), Domingo Valentín Guerra Arteaga y Leiva (in Spanish), Real Academia de la Historia
- Cheney, David M. (2018), "Archbishop Domingo Valentín Guerra Arteaga y Leiba", Catholic Hierarchy
- Cheney, David M. (2018b), "Diocese of Segovia", Catholic Hierarchy
- Salazar Mir, Adolfo de (2000), "Heraldica de la Catedral Hispalense", Revista Hidalguía número, vol. 280–281, Ediciones Hidalguia
