= Valentino Mastrozzi =

His Eminence Valentino Mastrozzi
- Cardinal-Priest of San Lorenzo in Panisperna
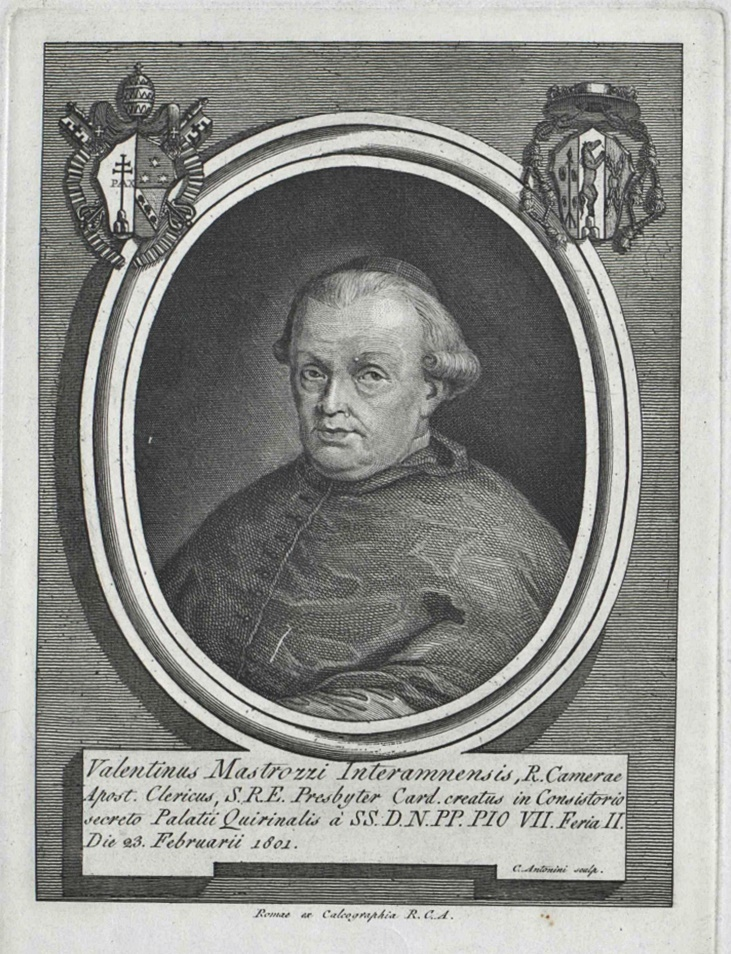
- Church: Roman Catholic Church
- Appointed: 20 July 1801
- Term ended: 13 May 1809
- Predecessor: Giovanni Battista Bussi de Pretis
- Successor: Pietro Gravina
- Other post: Camerlengo of the College of Cardinals (1809)

Orders
- Created cardinal: 23 February 1801 by Pope Pius VII
- Rank: Cardinal-Priest

Personal details
- Born: Valentino Mastrozzi; 24 July 1729 Terni, Papal States
- Died: 13 May 1809 (aged 79) Rome, Papal States

Valentino Mastrozzi (24 July 1729 in Terni, Italy – 13 May 1809 in Rome) was a cardinal of the Catholic Church, and was a member of the Roman Curia.

He was named a cardinal in February 1801 by Pope Pius VII.
