= Ruggero Luigi Emidio Antici Mattei =

Italian Cardinal of the Roman Catholic Church

His Eminence Ruggero Luigi Emidio Antici Mattei
- Cardinal-Priest of San Lorenzo in Panisperna
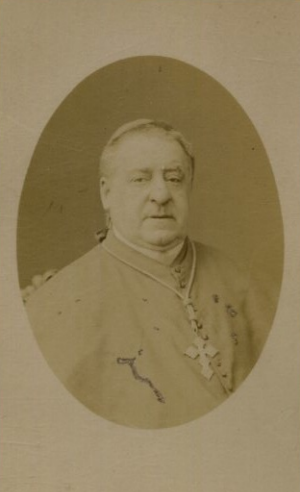
- The then-patriarch pictured on 4 January 1875.
- Church: Roman Catholic Church
- Appointed: 28 January 1876
- Term ended: 21 April 1883
- Predecessor: Luigi Bilio
- Successor: Sebastiano Galeati
- Previous posts: Secretary of the Consistorial Congregation (1850-75); Patriarch of Constantinople (1866-75)

Orders
- Ordination: 7 September 1834
- Consecration: 25 February 1866 by Costantino Patrizi Naro
- Created cardinal: 15 March 1875 ("in pectore"); 17 September 1875 (revealed) by Pope Pius IX
- Rank: Cardinal-Priest

Personal details
- Born: Ruggero Luigi Emidio Antici Mattei; 23 March 1811 Recanati, Papal States
- Died: 21 April 1883 (aged 72) Rome, Kingdom of Italy
- Buried: Campo Verano
- Parents: Carlo Teodoro Antici; Anna Maria Mattei
- Education: Roman College
- Coat of arms

Ruggero Luigi Emidio Antici Mattei (23 March 1811, Recanati, Marche — 21 April 1883) was an Italian Cardinal of the Roman Catholic Church. He served as Latin Patriarch of Constantinople from 1866 to 1875, and was elevated to the cardinalate by Pope Pius IX in 1875.

== Biography ==
Antici Mattei was born in Recanati to Carlo Teodoro Antici, marquis and baron of Pescia, and Anna Maria Mattei. A member of the house of Mattei, he was related to Cardinals Girolamo Mattei, Gaspare Mattei, Alessandro Mattei, Mario Mattei, and Lorenzo Girolamo Mattei.

He received the Sacrament of Confirmation on 4 July 1813. In 1818 he entered Collegio Nazareno, and studied at the Collegio Romano from 1826 to 1832. He received the Tonsure on 12 May 1831, followed by minor orders (8 September 1831), subdiaconate (2 February 1834) and diaconate (25 March 1834).

He was ordained a priest in Rome on 7 September 1834. He then served as examiner of the clergy of the St. Peter's Basilica, curate in the abbey of Forlimpopoli, and canon of the chapter of the Lateran Basilica. In 1837 he was named canon of the chapter of the Vatican basilica, later becoming its dean. He was later appointed referendary prelate on 13 July 1843 and served as a judge of the Reverend Fabric of St. Peter's from 1843 to 1847. He was secretary of the Sacred Consistorial Congregation and of the Sacred College of Cardinals from 1850 to 1875, and became prelate adjunct of the Sacred Congregation of the Tridentine Council in 1851.

On 8 January 1866 he was appointed Latin Patriarch of Constantinople by Pope Pius IX and Dean of the Assistants to the Pontifical Throne. He received his episcopal consecration on the following 25 February from Cardinal Costantino Patrizi Naro. He executed the decree of Pontifical coronation to image of Our Mother of Perpetual Help on 23 June 1867. He was later named auditor general of the Apostolic Chamber on 31 March 1875.

He participated in the 1878 conclave that elected Gioacchino Pecci as Pope Leo XIII.
