= Domingo Ortega =

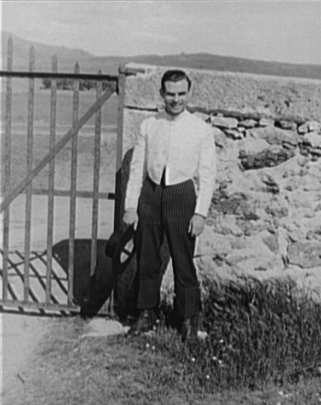
- Domingo Ortega (1935)
- Born: Domingo López Ortega; February 25, 1906; Borox, Toledo, Spain
- Died: May 8, 1988 (aged 82); Madrid, Spain

Domingo Ortega (February 25, 1906 – May 8, 1988) was a Spanish matador. Born Domingo López Ortega in Borox, Toledo, he was the son of a farmer, and grew up helping with farm work. During months when there was no work on the farm, he would travel to other towns selling garlic.

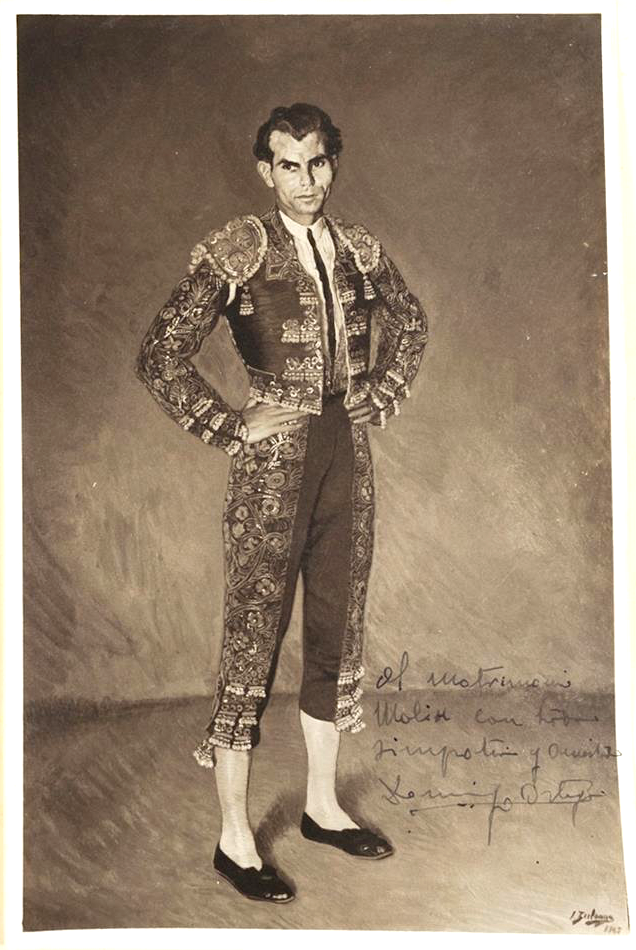
Autographed publicity photo of Spanish bullfighter Domingo Ortega after the portrait of him by the Spanish painter Ignacio Zuloaga.

== Career ==
In the summer of 1928, he went to a novillada, a bullfight of young bulls. During the fight, a bull injured the sole bullfighter present. Sensing an opportunity, Ortega jumped into the ring, asked for the bullfighter's tools, gave several passes, and killed the bull. The incident proved to be the start of a new career for him. In 1931, he had only performed in six novilladas when he received the alternativa — graduation from novillero to full matador de toros — from Gitanillo de Triana in Barcelona. The same year, his alternativa was confirmed by Nicanor Villalta in Madrid. He subsequently performed in many bullfights before retiring in 1950. He briefly came out of retirement for a period in 1953.

He is quoted as saying that the three canonical maxims of bullfighting, parar, templar y mandar ("to stop, to moderate, to command"), should be supplemented with a fourth: "to load," meaning the bullfighter should put his weight on his forward foot to put him closer to the bull. He said that a bullfighter being caught by the bull was always due to a mistake on the part of the bullfighter: "In bullfighting either the bullfighter or the bull is in command."

== Legacy ==
While most modern sources praise Ortega highly, Ernest Hemingway expressed a low opinion of him in Death in the Afternoon, describing him as "skillfully built up... with an elaborate press campaign and ballyhoo," and stating, "He was lousy". However Laura Riding refuted Hemingway's view strongly in her essay 'The Bull-Fight', calling Ortega "the critical modernist among contemporary bull-fighters" and saying "There are few books that have given me such a sense of learned simplicity as Ortega's work".

== Bibliography ==
- Conrad, Barnaby (1961). Barnaby Conrad's Encyclopedia of Bullfighting. Boston, Massachusetts: Houghton Mifflin. OCLC 33466783.
- V., J. (1988), "Muere en Madrid el matador de toros Domingo Ortega", El País, Madrid, Spain: Jesús de Polanco (published May 9, 1988)
