= Agostino Cusani =

Italian Roman Catholic cardinal (1542-1598)

His Eminence Agostino Cusani
- Cardinal-Priest of Santi Giovanni e Paolo
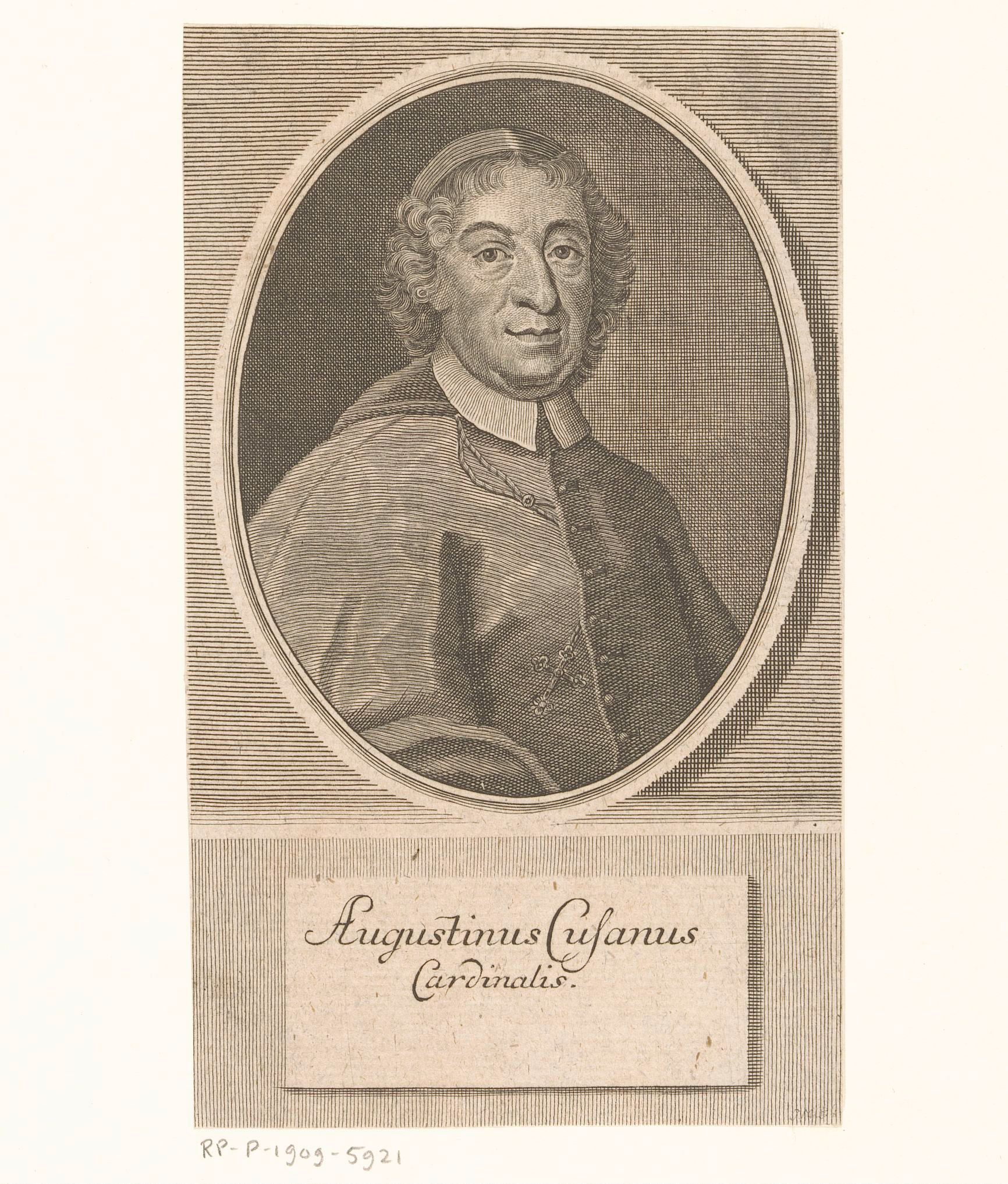
- Church: Roman Catholic Church
- Previous posts: Cardinal-Priest of San Lorenzo in Panisperna (1591–1595); Cardinal-Deacon of Sant'Adriano al Foro (1589-1591)

Orders
- Created cardinal: 14 Dec 1588
- Rank: Cardinal-Priest

Personal details
- Born: 1542 Milan
- Died: 20 Oct 1598 (aged 56) Milan
- Coat of arms: Agostino Cusani's coat of arms

Agostino Cusani (1542–1598) was a Roman Catholic cardinal.

Catholic Church titles
| Preceded by Girolamo Mattei | Cardinal-Deacon of Sant'Adriano al Foro; 1589–1591 | Succeeded by Odoardo Farnese |
| Preceded by Domenico Pinelli (seniore) | Cardinal-Priest of San Lorenzo in Panisperna; 1591–1595 | Succeeded by Lorenzo Bianchetti |
| Preceded by Ardicino della Porta (iuniore) | Cardinal-Priest of Santi Giovanni e Paolo; 1595–1598 | Succeeded by Francesco de Remolins |
