= Decio Carafa =

Italian archbishop and papal nuncio

- Archbishop of Naples
- Diocese: Naples
- See: Santa Maria Assunta
- Appointed: 1613
- Term ended: 1626
- Predecessor: Ottavio Acquaviva d'Aragona (seniore)
- Successor: Francesco Boncompagni
- Other post: papal nuncio

Orders
- Created cardinal: 17 August 1611

Personal details
- Born: 1556 Naples, Kingdom of Naples
- Died: 23 January 1626 (aged 69–70) Naples, Kingdom of Naples
- Buried: Naples Cathedral
- Denomination: Catholic

Decio Carafa (1556–1626) was an Archbishop of Naples who had previously served as papal nuncio to the Spanish Netherlands (1606–1607) and to Habsburg Spain (1607–1611).

== Life ==
Carafa was born in Naples in 1556, the son of Ottaviano Carafa, lord of Cerza Piccola, by Marzia Mormile. Trained to the clergy, he became an apostolic notary and domestic prelate in the Roman curia.

He served on a papal mission to Portugal in 1598–1605, after which Pope Paul V appointed him to the titular see of Damascus on 17 May 1606 and papal nuncio to Flanders on 12 June. He left Rome on 9 July, reached Brussels on 1 September, and was received in audience by the ruling Archdukes Albert and Isabella on 6 September 1606.

Carafa served in Flanders for only eight months, his main concern being to encourage the negotiations that led to the Twelve Years' Truce (1609–1621) temporarily ending the Eighty Years' War. In May 1607 he was transferred to Spain, arriving in Madrid on 25 July. He was received in audience by Philip III of Spain on 3 August 1607. In 1609 he convinced Francisco Suarez to write against the claims of James VI and I regarding the 1606 Oath of Allegiance. In 1610 he played a role in dissuading Philip III from making war on France over French claims in the Rhineland and Italy, and encouraging the negotiations that led to the marriage of Louis XIII to Anne of Austria. From day to day he represented papal interests in the ongoing implementation of Tridentine reform in Spain.

On 17 August 1611, he was created cardinal and recalled from Madrid. He did not leave Madrid until January 1612, after his successor's arrival, and was received by the pope on 2 April. On 7 January 1613, he was appointed archbishop of Naples, taking possession of the diocese by procuration on 8 May. He arrived in Naples only two years later, in May 1615.

As archbishop he held three diocesan synods, in 1619, 1622 and 1623, to improve clerical discipline and the fitting celebration of the liturgy. He issued decrees against excesses in ecclesiastical painting and music. He spent a great deal of money on restoring the interior of Naples Cathedral in the Baroque style. He also restored and enlarged the archiepiscopal palace.

As a cardinal, he took part in the conclaves of 1621, that elected Pope Gregory XV, and 1623, that elected Pope Urban VIII.

He died in Naples on 23 January 1626 and was buried in the cathedral.

Catholic Church titles
Preceded by Ferdinando Taverna	Apostolic Collector to Portugal; 1598 – 1604	Succeeded by Fabrizio Caracciolo Piscizi
Preceded by Robert Berthelot	Titular Archbishop of Damascus; 1606 – 1613	Succeeded by Francesco Sacrati
Preceded by Ottavio Mirto Frangipani	Apostolic Nuncio to Flanders; 1606 – 1607	Succeeded by Guido Bentivoglio
Preceded by Giovanni Garzia Mellini	Apostolic Nuncio to Spain; 1607 – 1611	Succeeded by Antonio Caetani (iuniore)
Preceded by Lorenzo Bianchetti	Cardinal-Priest of San Lorenzo in Panisperna; 1612	Succeeded by Felice Centini
Preceded by Pietro Aldobrandini	Cardinal-Priest of Santi Giovanni e Paolo; 1612 – 1626	Succeeded by Carlo Emmanuele Pio di Savoia
Preceded by Ottavio Acquaviva d'Aragona (seniore)	Archbishop of Naples; 1613 – 1626	Succeeded by Francesco Boncompagni
