= Lorenzo Bianchetti =

Italian cardinal

His Eminence Lorenzo Bianchetti
- Cardinal-Priest of San Lorenzo in Panisperna
- Church: Roman Catholic Church
- In office: 1596–1612

Orders
- Created cardinal: 5 Jun 1596
- Rank: Cardinal-Priest

Personal details
- Born: 12 Sep 1545 Bologna
- Died: 12 Mar 1612 (aged 66)

Lorenzo Bianchetti (1545–1612) was a Roman Catholic cardinal.

== Biography ==
He was born in Bologna on September 12, 1545, to Cesare Bianchetti and Maddalena Castelli. Born into a noble Bolognese family, his brother Lodovico served as maestro di camera (chamberlain) to Pope Gregory XIII.

He accompanied Ippolito Aldobrandini on his legation to Kraków and Enrico Caetani on the legation to France.

He was created a cardinal by Pope Clement VIII in the consistory of June 5, 1596. He participated in the conclave of March 1605, which elected Pope Leo XI, and in the conclave of May 1605, which elected Pope Paul V.

He died on March 12, 1612, at the age of 66, and was buried in the Church of the Gesù in Rome.

Catholic Church titles
Preceded by Agostino Cusani	Cardinal-Priest of San Lorenzo in Panisperna; 1596–1612	Succeeded by Decio Carafa
