= Antonio de Benavides y Bazán =

17th-century Roman Catholic patriarch

Most Reverend Antonio de Benavides y Bazán
- Patriarch of West Indies; Titular Archbishop of Tyrus
- Church: Catholic Church
- Archdiocese: Patriarchate of the West Indies
- In office: 1679–1691
- Predecessor: Antonio Manrique de Guzmán
- Successor: Pedro Portocarrero y Guzmán

Orders
- Consecration: 28 May 1679 by Savo Millini

Personal details
- Born: 1612 Madrid, Spain
- Died: 22 Jan 1691 (age 79)

Antonio de Benavides y Bazán (1612–1691) was a Roman Catholic prelate who served as Patriarch of West Indies (1679–1691), Titular Archbishop of Tyrus (1679–1691), and Apostolic Internuncio to Spain (1689–1690 and 1670).

== Biography ==
Antonio de Benavides y Bazán was born in 1612 in Madrid, Spain. In Jul 1670, he was appointed during the papacy of Pope Clement X as Apostolic Internuncio to Spain but resigned soon afterward in October 1670. On 10 Apr 1679, he was appointed during the papacy of Pope Innocent XI as Titular Archbishop of Tyrus and on 8 May 1679, named Patriarch of West Indies. On 28 May 1679, he was consecrated bishop by Savo Millini, Titular Archbishop of Caesarea in Cappadocia, with Antonio de Isla y Mena, Bishop of Osma, and Antonio Ibarra, Bishop of Almería, serving as co-consecrators. In Sep 1689, he was again appointed during the papacy of Pope Alexander VIII as Apostolic Internuncio to Spain; he resigned in Aug 1690. He served as Patriarch of West Indies until his death on 22 Jan 1691.

== External links and additional sources ==
- Cheney, David M. "Tyrus (Titular See)". Catholic-Hierarchy.org. (for Chronology of Bishops) ^{[self-published]}
- Chow, Gabriel. "Titular Metropolitan See of Tyrus (Lebanon)". GCatholic.org. (for Chronology of Bishops) ^{[self-published]}
- Cheney, David M. "Patriarchate of West Indies". Catholic-Hierarchy.org. (for Chronology of Bishops) ^{[self-published]}
- Chow, Gabriel. "Titular Patriarchal See of Indias Occidentales (Spain)". GCatholic.org. (for Chronology of Bishops) ^{[self-published]}
- Cheney, David M. "Nunciature to Spain". Catholic-Hierarchy.org. ^{[self-published]}
- Chow, Gabriel. "Apostolic Nunciature Spain". GCatholic.org. ^{[self-published]}

Catholic Church titles
| Preceded by Federico Borromeo (iuniore) | Apostolic Internuncio to Spain; 1670 (1st term) | Succeeded by Galeazzo Marescotti |
| Preceded by Antonio Manrique de Guzmán | Titular Archbishop of Tyrus; 1679–1691 | Succeeded by Pedro Portocarrero y Guzmán |
| Preceded by Antonio Manrique de Guzmán | Patriarch of West Indies; 1679–1691 | Succeeded by Pedro Portocarrero y Guzmán |
| Preceded by Marcello Durazzo | Apostolic Internuncio to Spain; 1689–1690 (2nd term) | Succeeded by Giuseppe Mosti |
