= Álvaro Eugenio de Mendoza Caamaño y Sotomayor =

Spanish aristocrat and Catholic priest

Álvaro de Mendoza Caamaño Sotomayor
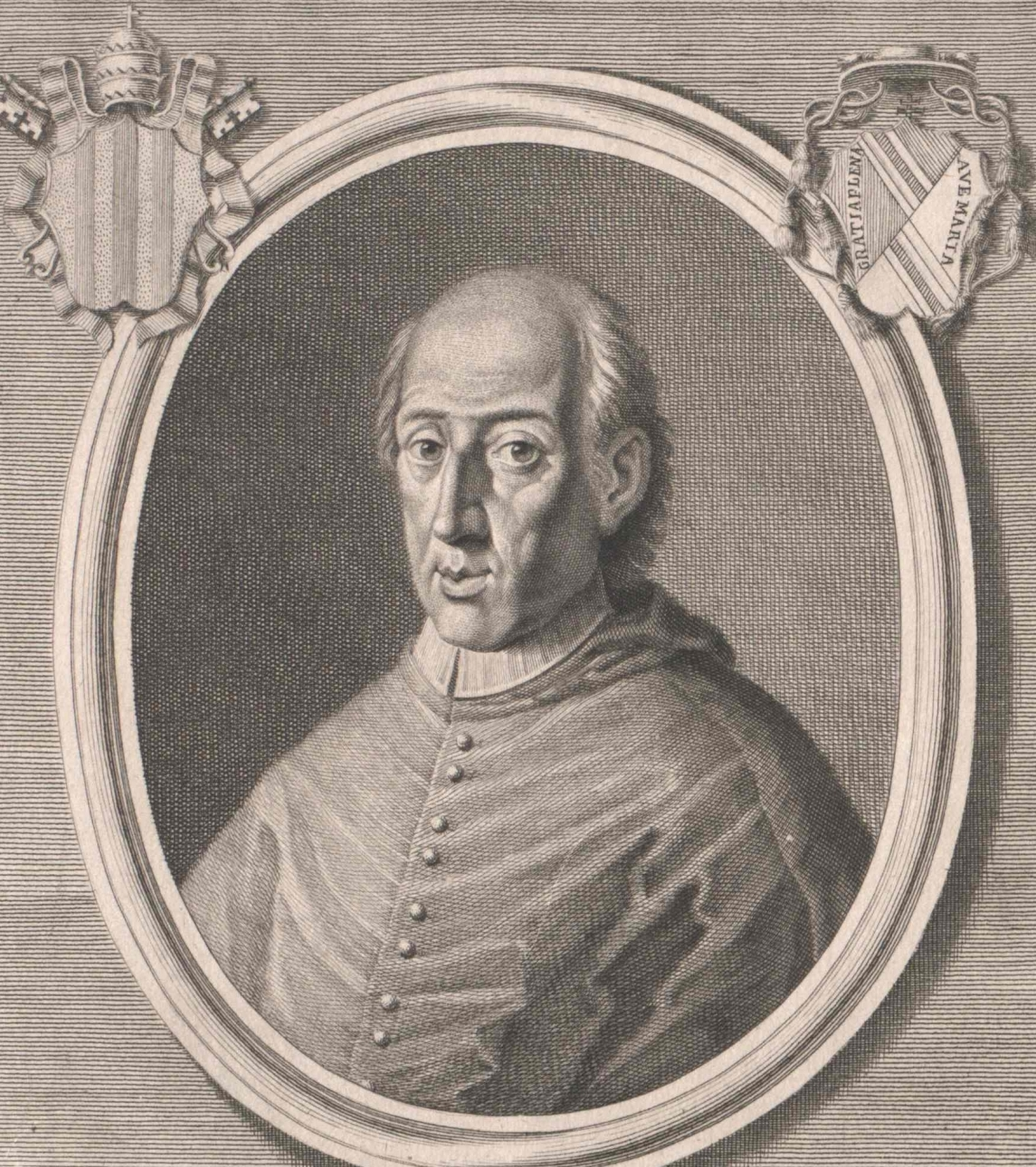
- Álvaro de Mendoza by Giovanni Domenico Campiglia, engraved by Pietro Antonio Pazzi

Patriarch of the West Indies
- In office 20 January 1734 – 23 January 1761
- Preceded by: Carlos de Borja y Centellas
- Succeeded by: Buenaventura Fernández de Córdoba Spínola

Cardinal
- In office 10 April 1747 – 23 January 1761

Personal details
- Born: 14 November 1671 Madrid, Spain
- Died: 23 January 1761 (aged 89) Madrid, Spain
- Occupation: Priest

Álvaro Eugenio de Mendoza Caamaño y Sotomayor (14 November 1671 – 23 January 1761) was a Spanish aristocrat and Catholic priest who became Patriarch of the West Indies and a Cardinal.

== Family ==
Álvaro Eugenio Cardinal de Mendoza Caamaño y Sotomayor was born on 14 November 1671 in Madrid, Spain and was baptized on 28 November 1671 in the parish of San Nicolás. His parents were Antonio Domingo de Mendoza, second Marquis of Villagarcía and viceroy of Valencia, and Juana Catalina de Rivera y Ronquillo. He studied at the University of Ávila and obtained a doctorate in theology.

== Career ==
King Charles II of Spain granted Mendoza the habit of the Order of Santiago in 1699, and he was invested into this order on 21 April 1700. Mendoza was ordained priest in July 1715. He was appointed Archdeacon of Toledo and of Santiago de Compostela. He was made Abbot nullius of Alcalá la Real and of Burgohondo on 28 March 1734. He was Major chaplain of the Royal Monastery of La Encarnación, Madrid, and the king's Sumiller de cortina. King Philip V of Spain named him his almoner and major chaplain.

The king nominated Mendoza to the patriarchate of the West Indies in November 1733. He was appointed Patriarch of the West Indies and Titular Archbishop of Pharsalus on 20 January 1734. As patriarch he succeeded Carlos de Borja y Centellas, who had died on 8 August 1733. He was ordained bishop on 9 May 1734 at the Royal Monastery of La Encarnación, Madrid. His principal consecrator was Archbishop Domingo Valentín Guerra Arteaga y Leiba, Bishop of Segovia. His principal co-consecrators were Benito Madueño y Ramos, Titular Bishop of Sion, and Dionisio Francisco Mellado Eguíluz, Titular Bishop of Lares.

King Ferdinand VI of Spain requested Mendoza's promotion to the cardinalate. Mendoza attended the consistory of April 1747. On 10 April 1747 he was elevated to Cardinal. The king gave him the red biretta of this rank in a ceremony on 16 August 1747 in the church of San Jerónimo el Real in Madrid. He never traveled to Rome to receive the red hat from the Pope. He was unable to attend the conclave of 1758 in which Pope Clement XIII was elected.

Mendoza died on 23 January 1761 in the Buen Retiro Palace in Madrid, and was buried in his mother's tomb in the monastery of San Gil, Madrid. He was succeeded as Patriarch of the West Indies by Buenaventura Fernández de Córdoba Spínola, who was appointed on 6 April 1761.

== Episcopal lineage ==
Mendoza's episcopal lineage or apostolic succession was:

- Archbishop Domingo Valentín Guerra Arteaga y Leiba (1726)
- Cardinal Carlos de Borja y Centellas (1705)
- Archbishop Francesco Acquaviva d’Aragona (1697)
- Cardinal Gaspare Carpegna (1670)
- Cardinal Paluzzo Paluzzi Altieri degli Albertoni (1666)
- Cardinal Ulderico Carpegna (1630)
- Cardinal Luigi Caetani (1622)
- Cardinal Ludovico Ludovisi (1621)
- Archbishop Galeazzo Sanvitale (1604)
- Cardinal Girolamo Bernerio, O.P. (1586)
- Cardinal Giulio Antonio Santorio (1566)
- Cardinal Scipione Rebiba

Mendoza was the principal consecrator of:

- Bishop Francisco Salgado Quirago (1734)
- Bishop Miguel Aguiar (1738)
- Bishop José Esteban Noriega (1738)
- Bishop Pedro González García (1739)
- Bishop Juan García Abadiano (1739)

== Sources ==
- Cheney, David M. (2019), "Álvaro Eugenio Cardinal de Mendoza Caamaño y Sotomayor", Catholic-Hierarchy
- Cheney, David M. (2019b), "Patriarchate of West Indies", Catholic-Hierarchy
- Miranda, Salvador, "MENDOZA, Álvaro de (1671-1761)", The Cardinals of the Holy Roman Church
