= Francisco del Rincón =

Spanish-born Minim friar and prelate

The Most Reverend Francisco del Rincón, OM
- Archbishop of Santafé en Nueva Granada
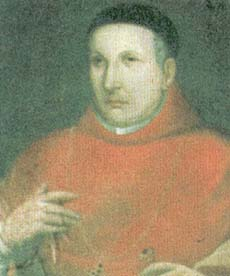
- Portrait of FRANCISCO DEL RINCON
- Church: Roman Catholic Church
- Archdiocese: Santafé en Nueva Granada
- Province: Santafé en Nueva Granada
- Appointed: 5 October 1716
- Installed: 24 January 1718
- Predecessor: Francisco de Otero y Cossío
- Successor: Antonio Claudio Alvarez de Quiñones
- Previous posts: Archbishop of Santo Domingo (1705–1714); Archbishop of Caracas (1714–1716); President of the Royal Audience of Santa Fe de Bogotá (1717–1718)

Orders
- Consecration: 29 June 1707 by Jerónimo Nosti de Valdés, OS Bas.

Personal details
- Born: 29 January 1650 Borox, Toledo, Spain
- Died: 28 June 1723 (aged 73) Bogotá, Viceroyalty of New Granada
- Education: University of Bologna

Francisco del Rincón, OM (29 January 1650 – 28 June 1723) was a Spanish-born Minim friar and prelate of the Catholic Church in the New World, in what is now the Dominican Republic, Venezuela, and Colombia.

From 1705 to 1714, Rincón was Archbishop of Santo Domingo, and was appointed Archbishop of Caracas in 1714, but he declined to accept the position. In 1716, he was appointed Archbishop of Santafé en Nueva Granada (now the Archdiocese of Bogotá), where he served until his death in 1723. He also had political influence in the Viceroyalty of New Granada, serving as President of the Royal Audience of Santafé de Bogotá from 1717 to 1718.

== Biography ==
=== Early life and education ===
Rincón was born on 29 January 1650 in Borox, Toledo, Spain. He was educated at the University of Bologna in Italy, where he graduated with a degree in theology.

=== Priesthood ===
Rincón joined the Order of Minims, where he held various leadership positions, including being the Provincial Superior of Castile. In Toledo, he served as synodal examiner of the Apostolic Nunciature, and qualifier of the Council of the Supreme and General Inquisition.

=== Episcopacy ===
On 14 December 1705, Rincón was appointed by Pope Clement XI to be Archbishop of Santo Domingo in what is now the Dominican Republic. His episcopal consecration took place on 29 June 1707, with Bishop of Santiago de Cuba Jerónimo Nosti de Valdés, OS Bas., serving as principal consecrator.

On 26 February 1714, Pope Clement XI appointed Rincón Archbishop of Caracas, but he never took possession of the archdiocese. On 5 October 1716 he was appointed by Pope Clement XI as Archbishop of Santafé en Nueva Granada (now the Archdiocese of Bogotá). From 1717 until June 1718, he served as the President of the Royal Audience of Santafé de Bogotá. He was installed in his position as archbishop on 24 January 1718. He died of illness, in Bogotá on 28 June 1723 and was buried in the Primatial Cathedral of Bogotá.

== Episcopal lineage ==
- Cardinal Guillaume d'Estouteville, OSB
- Pope Sixtus IV (1471)
- Pope Julius II (1481)
- Cardinal Raffaele Riario (1504)
- Pope Leo X (1513)
- Cardinal Alessandro Farnese (1519)
- Cardinal Francesco Pisani (1527)
- Cardinal Alfonso Gesualdo (1564)
- Pope Clement VIII (1592)
- Cardinal Pietro Aldobrandini (1604)
- Bishop Laudivio Zacchia (1605)
- Cardinal Antonio Barberini, OFM Cap (1625)
- Cardinal Marco Antonio Franciotti (1637)
- Cardinal Giambattista Spada (1643)
- Cardinal Carlo Pio di Savoia (1655)
- Archbishop Jaime de Palafox y Cardona (1677)
- Cardinal Luis Manuel Fernández de Portocarrero (1678)
- Patriarch Pedro Portocarrero y Guzmán (1691)
- Bishop Jerónimo Nosti de Valdés, OS Bas (1704)

== External links and additional sources ==
- Cheney, David M. "Archdiocese of Santo Domingo". Catholic-Hierarchy.org. (for Chronology of Bishops) ^{[self-published]}
- Chow, Gabriel. "Metropolitan Archdiocese of Santo Domingo". GCatholic.org. (for Chronology of Bishops) ^{[self-published]}
- Cheney, David M. "Archdiocese of Caracas, Santiago de Venezuela". Catholic-Hierarchy.org. (for Chronology of Bishops) ^{[self-published]}
- Chow, Gabriel. "Metropolitan Archdiocese of Caracas". GCatholic.org. (for Chronology of Bishops) ^{[self-published]}
