= Benito Madueño y Ramos =

Spanish Roman Catholic prelate

Most Reverend Benito Madueño y Ramos
- Auxiliary Bishop of Toledo
- Church: Catholic Church
- Archdiocese: Archdiocese of Toledo
- In office: 1698–1739

Orders
- Consecration: 1699

Personal details
- Born: 1654 Montoro
- Died: 11 May 1739 (aged 84–85) Toledo, Spain

Benito Madueño y Ramos (1654 – 11 May 1739) was a Roman Catholic prelate who served as Auxiliary Bishop of Toledo (1698–1739).

== Biography ==
Benito Madueño y Ramos was born in Montoro in 1654. On 19 December 1698, he was appointed during the papacy of Pope Innocent XII as Auxiliary Bishop of Toledo and Titular Bishop of Sion. He was consecrated bishop in 1699. He served as Auxiliary Bishop of Toledo until his death on 11 May 1739.

== Episcopal succession ==
Episcopal succession of Benito Madueño y Ramos

While bishop, he was the principal co-consecrator of:

- Juan Feyjóo González de Villalobos, Bishop of Guadix (1702);
- Pedro Francisco Levanto Vivaldo, Titular Bishop of Lacedaemonia and Auxiliary Bishop of Seville (1703);
- Francisco de Cosío y Otero, Archbishop of Santafé en Nueva Granada (1704);
- Miguel Pérez Lara Bishop of Coria (1705);
- Bartolomé Cernuda Rico y Piñeros, Bishop of Plasencia (1713);
- Luis de Salcedo y Azcona, Bishop of Coria (1713);
- Antonio Monroy y Meneses, Bishop of Santa Marta (1715);
- Felipe Antonio Gil Taboada, Bishop of Osma (1715);
- Juan José de Escalona y Calatayud, Bishop of Caracas (1717);
- Pedro Magaña, Bishop of Solsona, (1717);
- Bartolomé Camacho Madueño, Bishop of Tortosa (1720);
- Miguel Herrero Esgueva, Bishop of Osma (1720);
- Martín Zalayeta Lizarza, Bishop of León (1720);
- Gregorio Téllez, Bishop of Ciudad Rodrigo (1721);
- Juan Lancaster Norona, Bishop of Cuenca (1721);
- Miguel Estela, Bishop of Jaca (1721);
- Antonio Maldonado y Minoja, Bishop of Oviedo (1722);
- Juan Fernández Zapata, Bishop of Mallorca (1722);
- Jacinto Valledor Fresno, Bishop of Osma (1723);
- Andrés Murillo Velarde, Bishop of Pamplona (1725);
- Bernardo Jiménez Cascante, Bishop of Barcelona (1725);
- Domingo Valentín Guerra Arteaga y Leiba, Titular Archbishop of Amida (1726);
- Agustín Rodríguez Delgado, Bishop of Panamá (1726);
- José Sancho Granado, Bishop of Salamanca (1730);
- José Marín y Ibáñez, Bishop of Almería (1731);
- Manuel Isidro Orozco Manrique de Lara, Bishop of Jaén (1732);
- José Platas, Titular Bishop of Adramyttium and Auxiliary Bishop of Santiago de Compostela (1732); and
- Álvaro Eugenio de Mendoza Caamaño y Sotomayor, Patriarch of the West Indies (1734).
