= Pasquale Cati =

Italian painter (c. 1550–c. 1620)

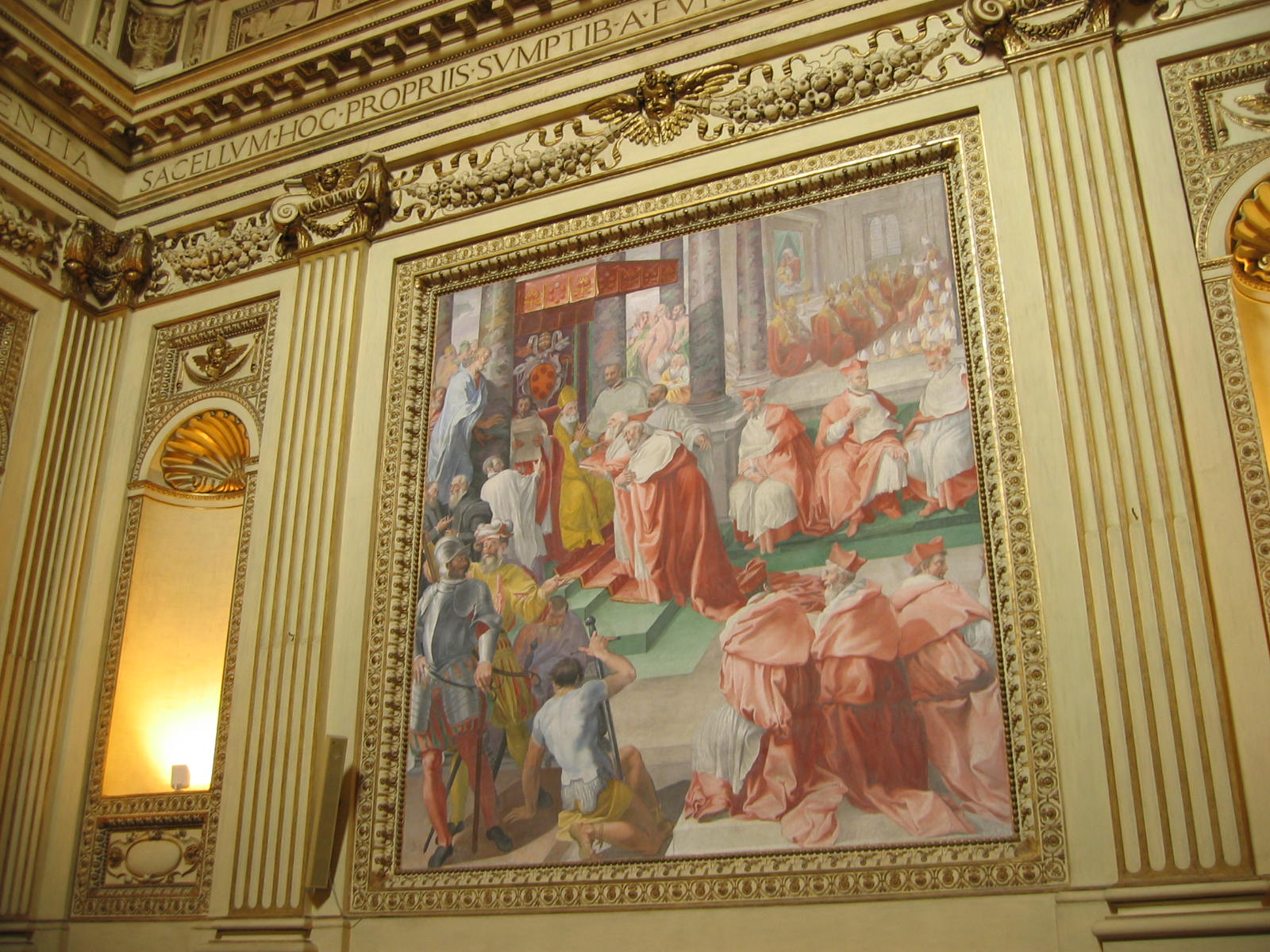
Pope Pius IV promulgates the bull "Benedictus Deus" (1588), fresco, Altemps chapel

Pasquale Cati (c. 1550–c. 1620) was an Italian Mannerist painter active mostly in Rome.

Born in Jesi, Cati moved to Rome, where he was known as a follower, if not pupil, of Michelangelo, and later of Federico Zuccari. Among his works are frescoes in the Remigius chapel of San Luigi dei Francesi, frescoes depicting the life of the Titular saint in San Lorenzo in Panisperna, and in walls and vault in the Altemps chapel in Santa Maria in Trastevere. He is also known for a painting depicting the assembled clergy for the Council of Trent.

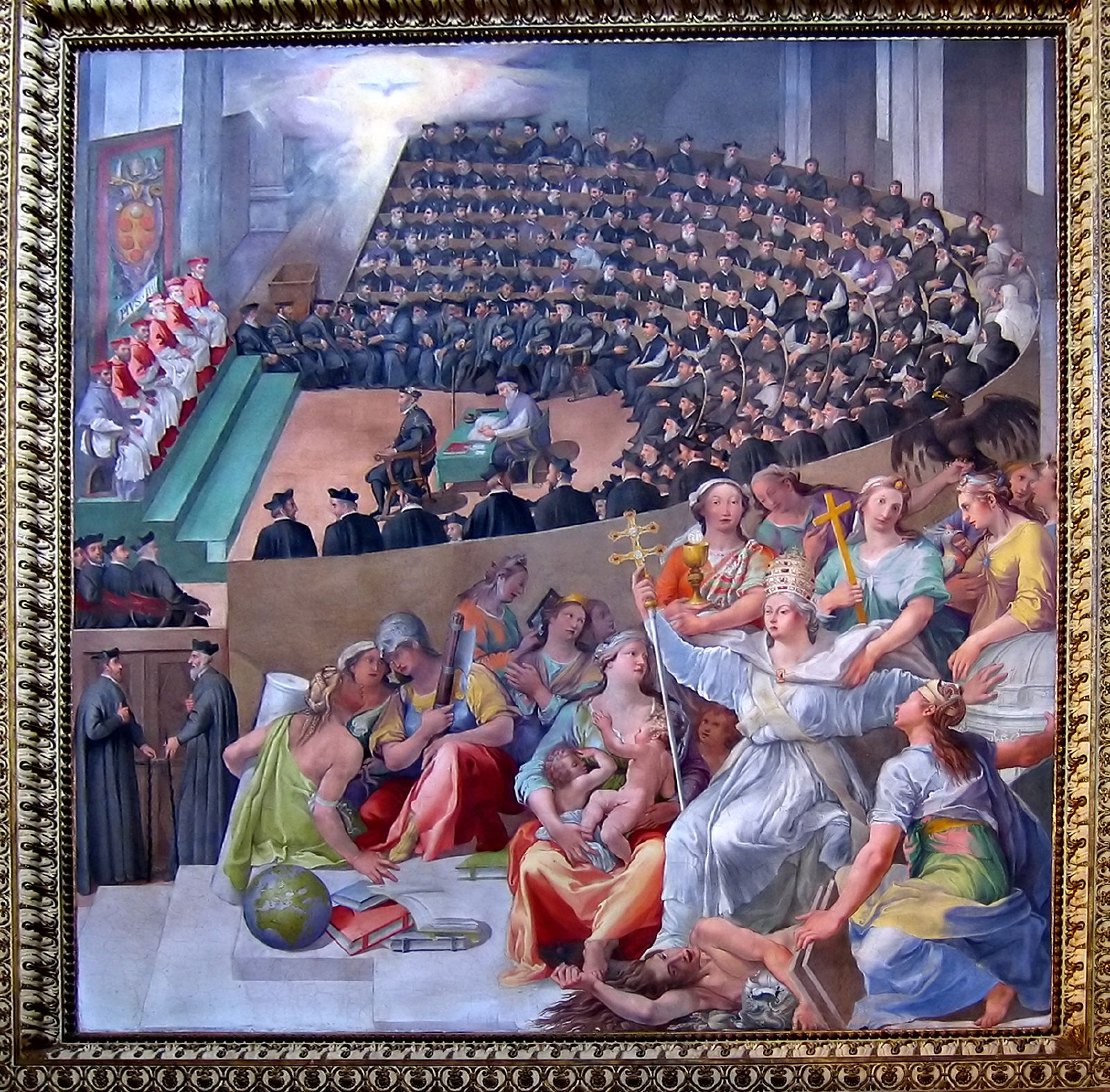
Council of Trent (1588), Santa Maria in Trastevere, Rome.

Cati was one of the painters engaged during the papacy of Gregory XIII in painting the ceiling of the Galleria Geografica. The maps on the wall had been painted by Ignazio Danti, but the ceiling decorations were completed by a team working under Girolamo Muziano that included Cati, Raffaelino da Reggio, Paris Nogari, Ottaviano Mascherini, Marco da Faenza, Giovanni da Modena, Girolamo Massei, Giacomo Sementa, Lorenzino da Bologna, Antonio Danti, Antonio Tempesta, and Paolo Brill.

Art Historian Luigi Lanzi briefly takes note of him as an "inexhaustible painter of that age, though somewhat affected." Giovanni Baglione mentions him in his biographies.
