= Argüébanes =

Coordinates: 43°10′N 4°40′W

Argüébanes is a town in the municipality of Camaleño (Cantabria, Spain).

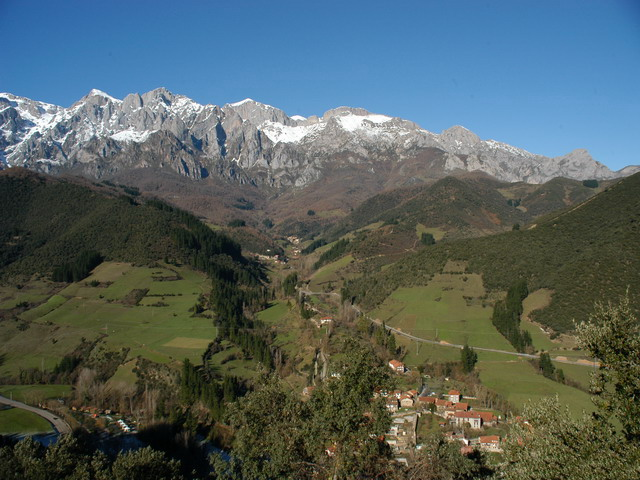
Turieno and Argüébanes with the Picos de Europa in the background
