= Buenaventura Fernández de Córdoba Spínola =

Spanish aristocrat and Catholic priest

His Eminence Buenaventura Fernández de Córdoba Spínola
- Cardinal, Patriarch of the West Indies
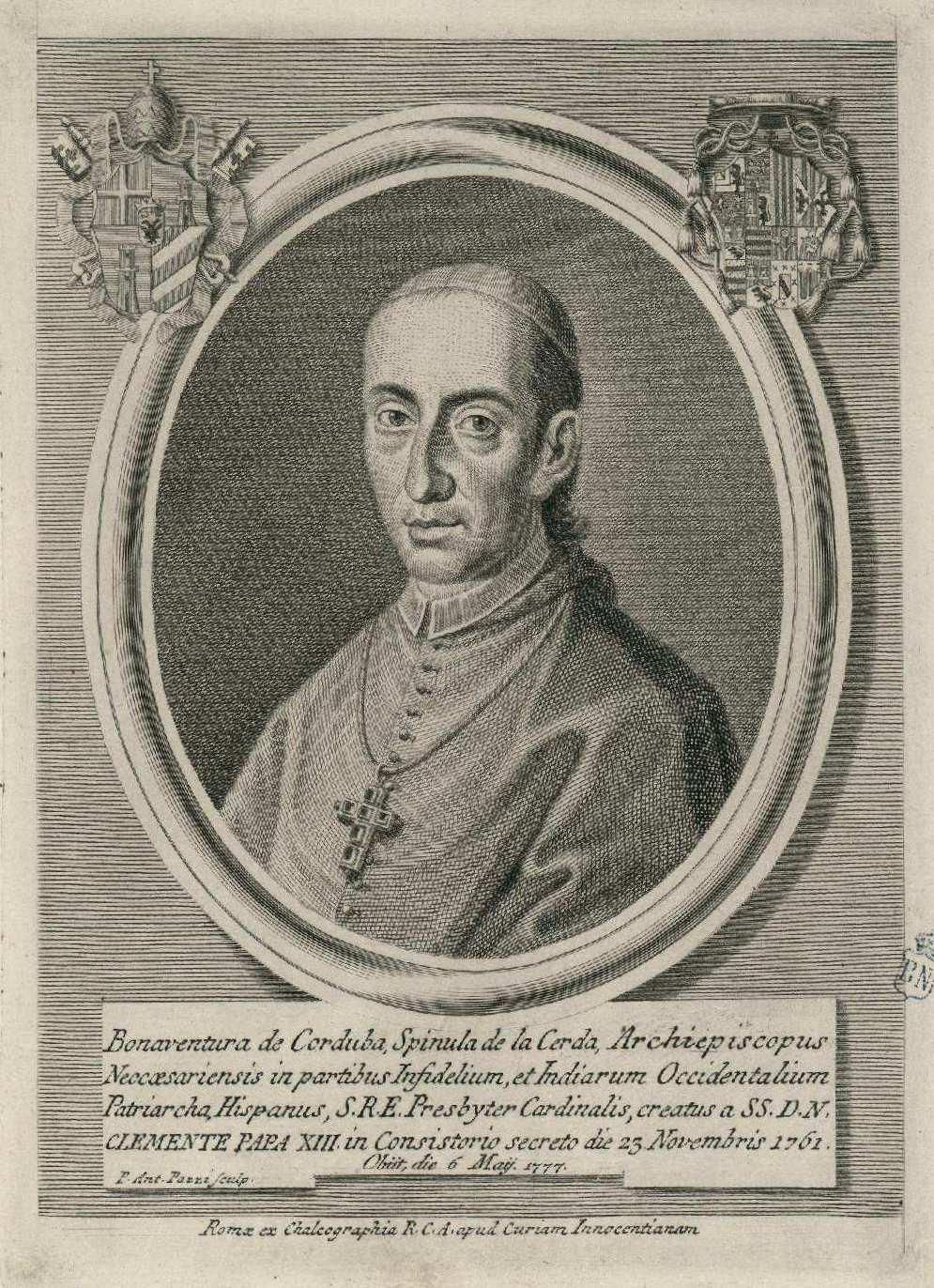
- In office: 1761–1777
- Predecessor: Álvaro de Mendoza Caamaño Sotomayor
- Successor: Francisco Javier Delgado y Venegas
- Other posts: Cardinal-Priest of San Lorenzo in Panisperna (1769–77); Titular Archbishop of Neocaesarea in Ponto (1761–77)

Orders
- Consecration: 28 June 1761 by Manuel Quintano Bonifaz
- Created cardinal: 23 November 1761 by Pope Clement XIII
- Rank: Cardinal-Priest

Personal details
- Born: 23 February 1724 Madrid, Spain
- Died: 6 January 1777 (aged 52) Madrid, Spain

Buenaventura Fernández de Córdoba-Figueroa y Spínola de la Cerda (or Buenaventura Córdoba Espinosa de la Cerda; 23 February 1724 – 6 January 1777) was a Spanish aristocrat and Catholic priest who became Patriarch of the West Indies and a Cardinal.

== Family ==
Buenaventura Fernández de Córdoba Spínola de la Cerda was born on 23 February 1724, the fifth of a family of seven children. His full baptismal name was Buenaventura Francisco de Sales Antonio Ramón Pascual Pío Bibiano María de la Soledad Juan de Mata Luis Alfonso de la Concepción Policarpo Venancio Diego José Francisco de Asís.

His parents were Nicolás María Fernández de Córdoba Figueroa de la Cerda, 9th Marquis of Priego, Villafranca and Montalbán, Duke of Feria and 10th Duke of Medinaceli, and Jerónima María Spínola de la Cerda. His father was one of the most powerful and wealthy men in 18th century Spain, who had inherited the house of Priego and Feria from his father, and the Duchy of Medinaceli after the death of his maternal uncle, the last male descendant of the house of Cerda. Buenaventura was given an excellent education by private tutors. He studied letters, languages and theology, and earned a doctorate in theology.

== Career ==
After being ordained, Buenaventura was named chaplain and grand almoner of King Charles III of Spain. He was consecrated as bishop in the Royal Church of San Jerónimo, Madrid on 28 June 1761 by Manuel Quintano Bonifaz, Titular Archbishop of Pharsalus and Inquisitor general for Spain. His principal co-consecrators were Manuel Antonio de Murillo y Argáiz, Bishop of Segovia and Andrés Cano y Junquera, Titular Bishop of Arad. Due to his powerful family, when he became a priest he was naturally given high positions in the church. He was made Abbot Major of Rute, one of the richest abbeys in Andalusia. He was later appointed Canon of Toledo and Archdeacon of Talavera. He became Abbot nullius of Alcalá la Real in 1761.

Buenaventura was sponsored by Charles III as archbishop of Neocesárea. On 6 April 1762 he was appointed Titular Archbishop of Neocaesarea in Ponto and Patriarch of the West Indies. As patriarch, he replaced Álvaro de Mendoza Caamaño Sotomayor, who had died on 23 January 1761. He was military vicar of Spain from 1762 until his death. He was a judge of the Royal Chapel. Buenaventura was a member of the king's council.

Buenaventura was made a cardinal at the request of King Charles III. Pope Clement XIII appointed him cardinal on 23 November 1761. He participated in the conclave that elected a new pope on 19 May 1769. He was installed as Cardinal-Priest of San Lorenzo in panisperna on 26 June 1769. As cardinal-priest he replaced Lorenzo (Giovanni Vincenzo Antonio) Ganganelli, who had been elected as Pope Clement XIV. He then made a trip through Italy and visited the courts of Leopold, Duke of Tuscany (the future Holy Roman Emperor), Ferdinand, Duke of Parma and King Charles Emmanuel III of Sardinia.

After returning from Italy Buenaventura suffered an apoplectic attack, the first of a series of attacks, which greatly limited what he could do. He was not able to participate in the conclave of 1774–75. He died on 6 May 1777. He bequeathed his wealth to foundation of a school for orphan boys and girls. He was replaced as Patriarch of the West Indies by Francisco Javier Delgado y Venegas, who was appointed on 30 March 1778. He was replaced as cardinal-priest by Giovanni Battista Bussi de Pretis, who was appointed on 12 September 1794.

== Episcopal lineage ==
Buenaventura's episcopal lineage or apostolic succession was:

- Cardinal Scipione Rebiba
- Cardinal Giulio Antonio Santorio (1566)
- Cardinal Girolamo Bernerio, OP (1586)
- Archbishop Galeazzo Sanvitale (1604)
- Cardinal Ludovico Ludovisi (1621)
- Cardinal Luigi Caetani (1622)
- Cardinal Ulderico Carpegna (1630)
- Cardinal Paluzzo Paluzzi Altieri degli Albertoni (1666)
- Pope Benedict XIII (1675)
- Pope Benedict XIV (1724)
- Archbishop Enrico Enríquez (1743)
- Bishop Manuel Quintano Bonifaz (1749)
- Cardinal Buenaventura Córdoba Espinosa de la Cerda (1761)

He was principal consecrator of:

- Giuseppe Maria Cardinal Doria Pamphilj

== Sources ==
- Buenaventura Fernández de Córdoba Spínola de la Cerda, Fundación Casa Ducal de Medinaceli
- Cheney, David M. (2019), "Buenaventura Cardinal Córdoba Espinosa de la Cerda", Catholic-Hierarchy
- Cheney, David M. (2019b), "Patriarchate of West Indies", Catholic-Hierarchy
- Cheney, David M. (2019c), "San Lorenzo in Panisperna", Catholic-Hierarchy
- Miranda, Salvador, "Córdoba Espinola de la Cerda, Buenaventura de (1724-1777)", The Cardinals of the Holy Roman Church, archived from the original on 2019-07-20
- Molina Recio, Raúl (2018), Buenaventura Fernández de Córdoba Spínola y de la Cerda (in Spanish), Real Academia de la Historia
