= Hontanar =

Coordinates: 39°37′N 4°30′W

- municipality
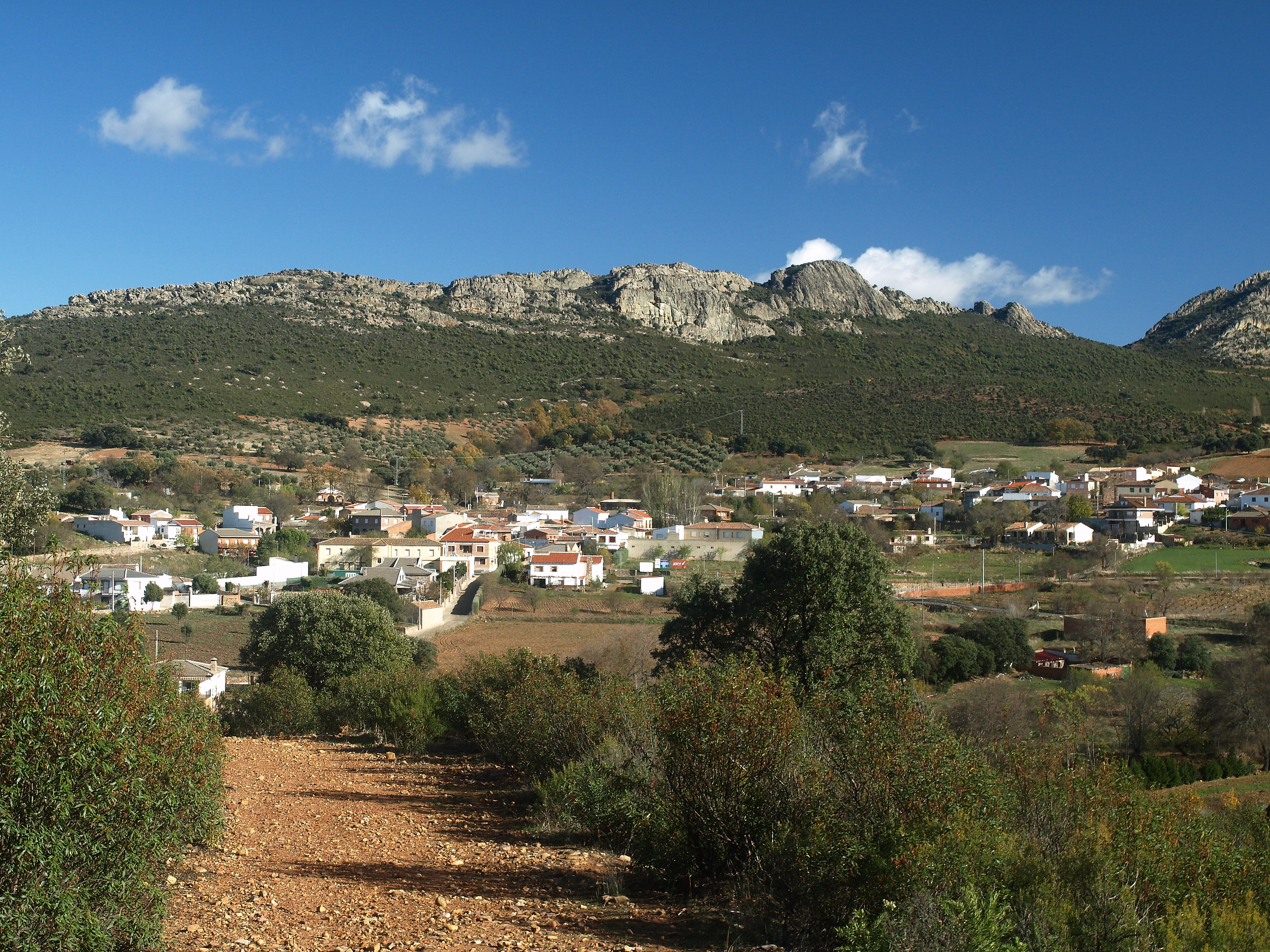
- View of Hontanar, province of Toledo, Spain.

- Flag Coat of arms
- Interactive map of Hontanar
- Country: Spain
- Autonomous community: Castile-La Mancha
- Province: Toledo
- Municipality: Hontanar

Area
  - Total: 152 km^{2} (59 sq mi)
- Elevation: 654 m (2,146 ft)

Population (2025-01-01)
  - Total: 139
  - Density: 0.914/km^{2} (2.37/sq mi)
- Time zone: UTC+1 (CET)
  - Summer (DST): UTC+2 (CEST)

Hontanar is a municipality located in the province of Toledo, Castile-La Mancha, Spain. According to the 2006 census (INE), the municipality has a population of 132 inhabitants.
