= Carlos de Borja y Centellas =

Spanish cardinal

His Eminence Carlos de Borja y Centellas
- Cardinal, Patriarch of the West Indies
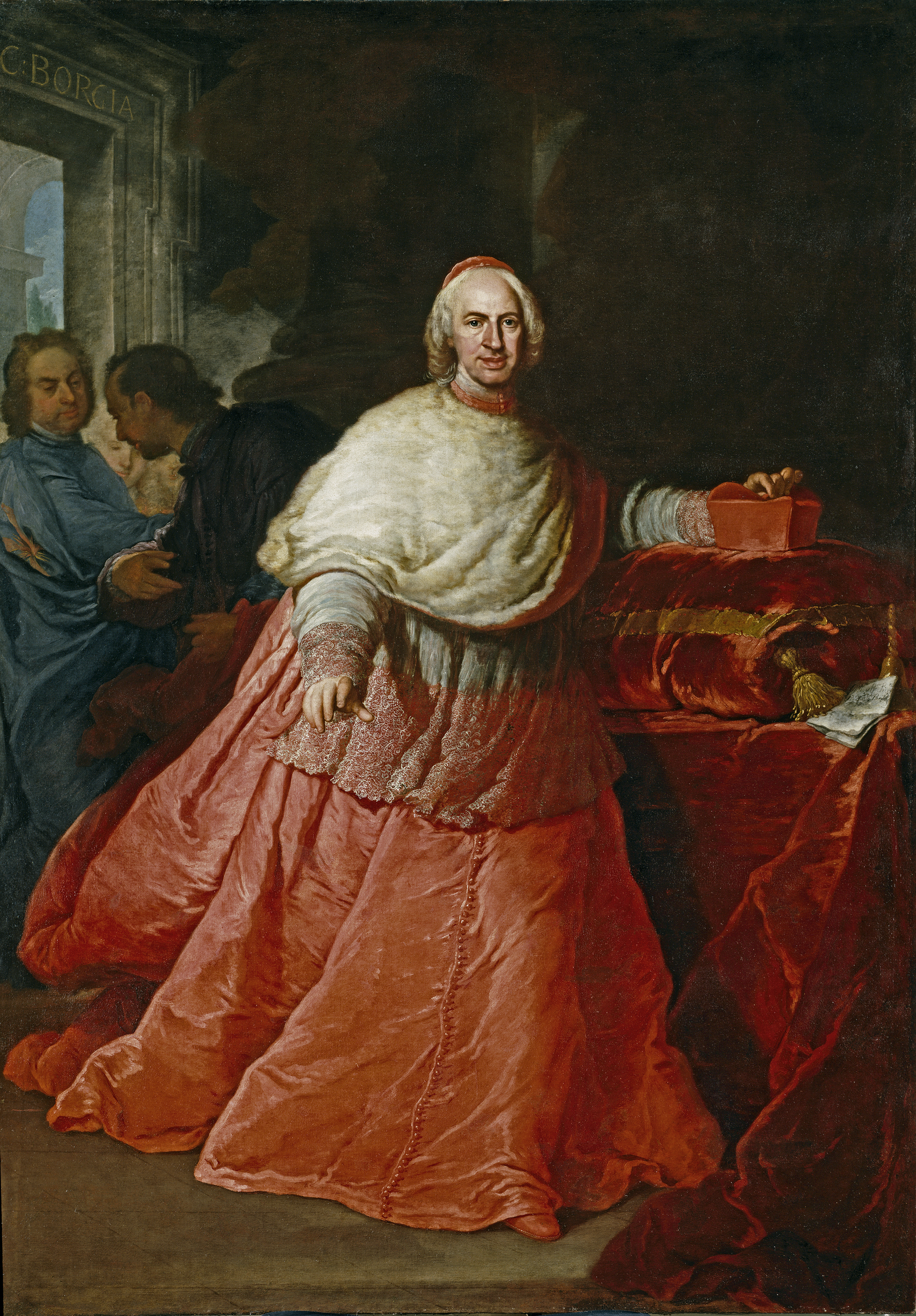
- Portrait by Andrea Procaccini, Museo del Prado
- Church: Roman Catholic
- Appointed: 3 October 1708
- Term ended: 8 August 1733
- Predecessor: Pedro Portocarrero y Guzmán
- Successor: Álvaro Eugenio de Mendoza Caamaño y Sotomayor
- Other post: Cardinal-Priest of Santa Pudenziana (1721–33)
- Previous post: Titular Archbishop of Trapezus (1705–21)

Orders
- Consecration: 30 November 1705 by Francesco Acquaviva
- Created cardinal: 30 September 1720 by Pope Clement XI
- Rank: Cardinal-Priest

Personal details
- Born: 29 April 1663 Gandia, Spain
- Died: 8 August 1733 (aged 70) Real Sitio de San Ildefonso, Spain
- Education: Colegio Mayor de San Ildefonso

Carlos de Borja Centellas y Ponce de León (29 April 1663 – 8 August 1733) was a Spanish cardinal. He served as Patriarch of the West Indies and as the first Vicar-General of the Spanish armies.

== Life ==
He was a younger son of Francisco Carlos de Borja y Centellas, 9th Duke of Gandía, and his wife María Ponce de León. Destined for career as an ecclesiastic from a young age, he studied at the Colegio Mayor de San Ildefonso of the University of Alcalá between 1669 and 1670. There he obtained a doctorate in both canon and civil law.

In his early career, he was named a canon of Toledo and was archdeacon of Madrid. He was also made vice-almoner major to Carlos II, and acquired several benefices. He accompanied the King to Barcelona and Italy in 1701, and was appointed the first Vicar-General of the Spanish armies in 1702. On 20 July 1705, he was appointed titular archbishop of Trapezus.

He was ordained to the episcopate on 30 November 1705 at the convent of the Incarnation in Madrid. The principal consecrator was Francesco Acquaviva d'Aragona, and the principal co-consecrators were Francisco Solís Hervás and Julián Cano y Tevar. The ceremony was attended by the king, queen and the entire court. He was made Patriarch of the West Indies in 1708, and baptised Infante Felipe in 1709 and another Infante Felipe in 1720.

He was elevated to the cardinalate in 1720, after receiving the recommendation of King Philip V. He was installed as cardinal-priest of Santa Pudenziana in 1721. He participated in the papal conclave of 1724 which elected Pope Benedict XIII.

He had a brother, Francisco, who was also a cardinal.
