= Turieno =

Coordinates: 43°09′N 4°39′W

Turieno is a town in the municipality of Camaleño (Cantabria, Spain).

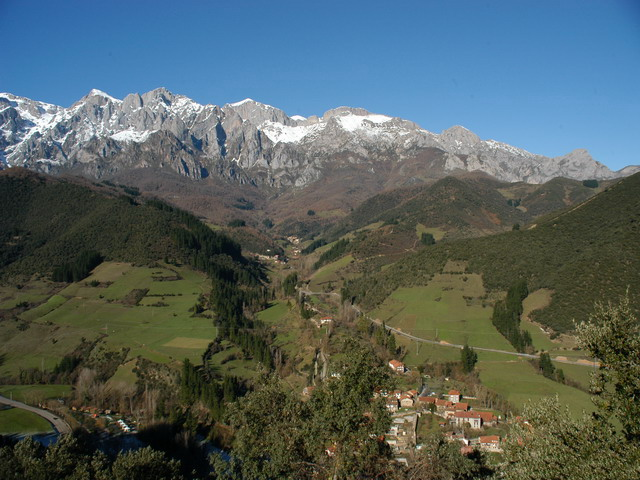
Turieno and Argüébanes with the Picos de Europa in the background
