= Robledillo de Gata =

Coordinates: 40°19′N 6°28′W

Robledillo de Gata, Spain
- municipality
- Coat of arms
- Interactive map of Robledillo de Gata, Spain
- Country: Spain
- Autonomous community: Extremadura
- Province: Cáceres
- Municipality: Robledillo de Gata

Area
  - Total: 31 km^{2} (12 sq mi)

Population (2025-01-01)
  - Total: 91
  - Density: 2.9/km^{2} (7.6/sq mi)
- Time zone: UTC+1 (CET)
  - Summer (DST): UTC+2 (CEST)

Robledillo de Gata is a municipality located in the province of Cáceres, Extremadura, Spain. According to the 2006 census (INE), the municipality has 136 inhabitants.

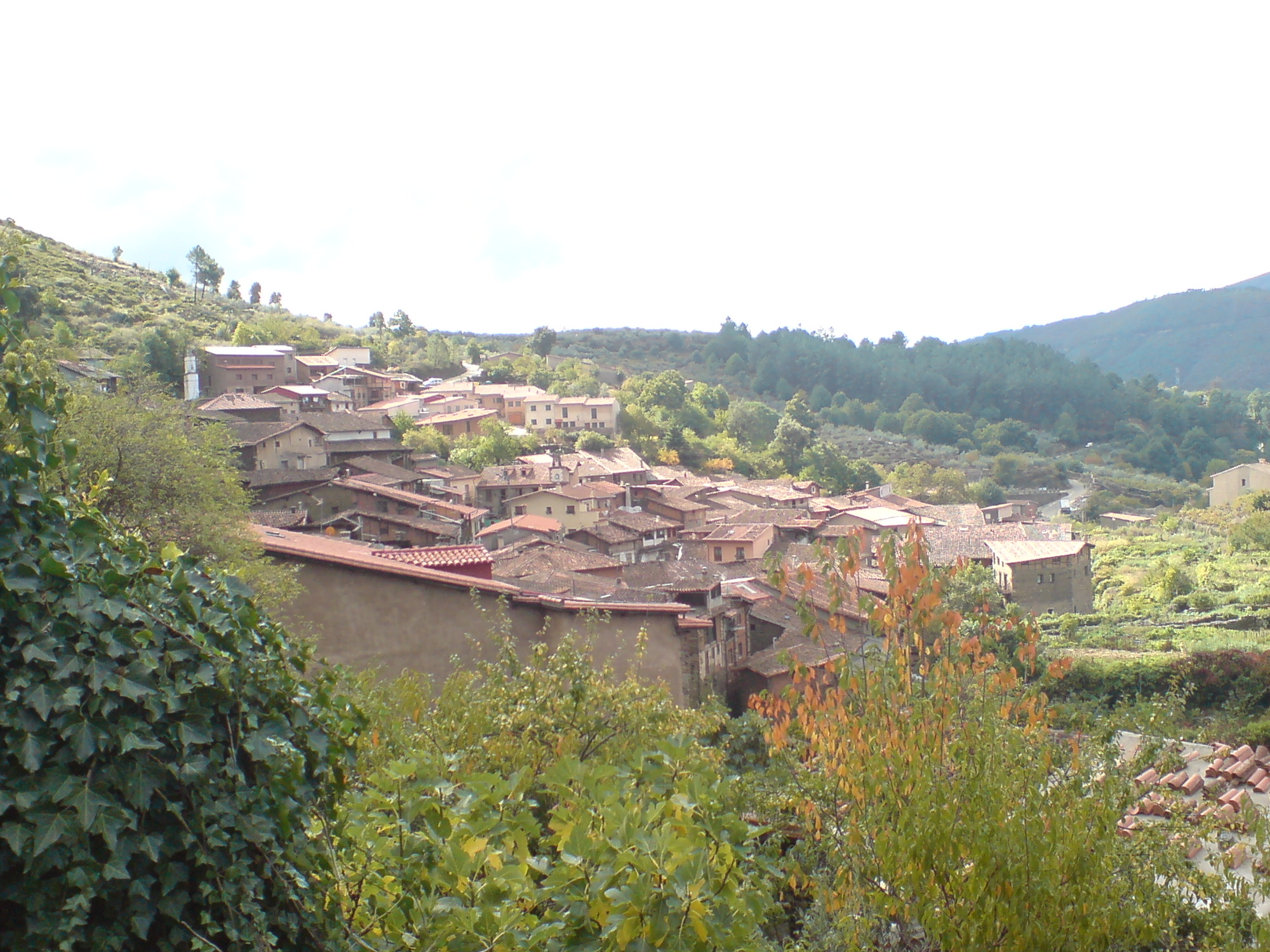
View of Robledillo de Gata

== See also ==
- List of municipalities in Cáceres
