= Astráin =

- Council
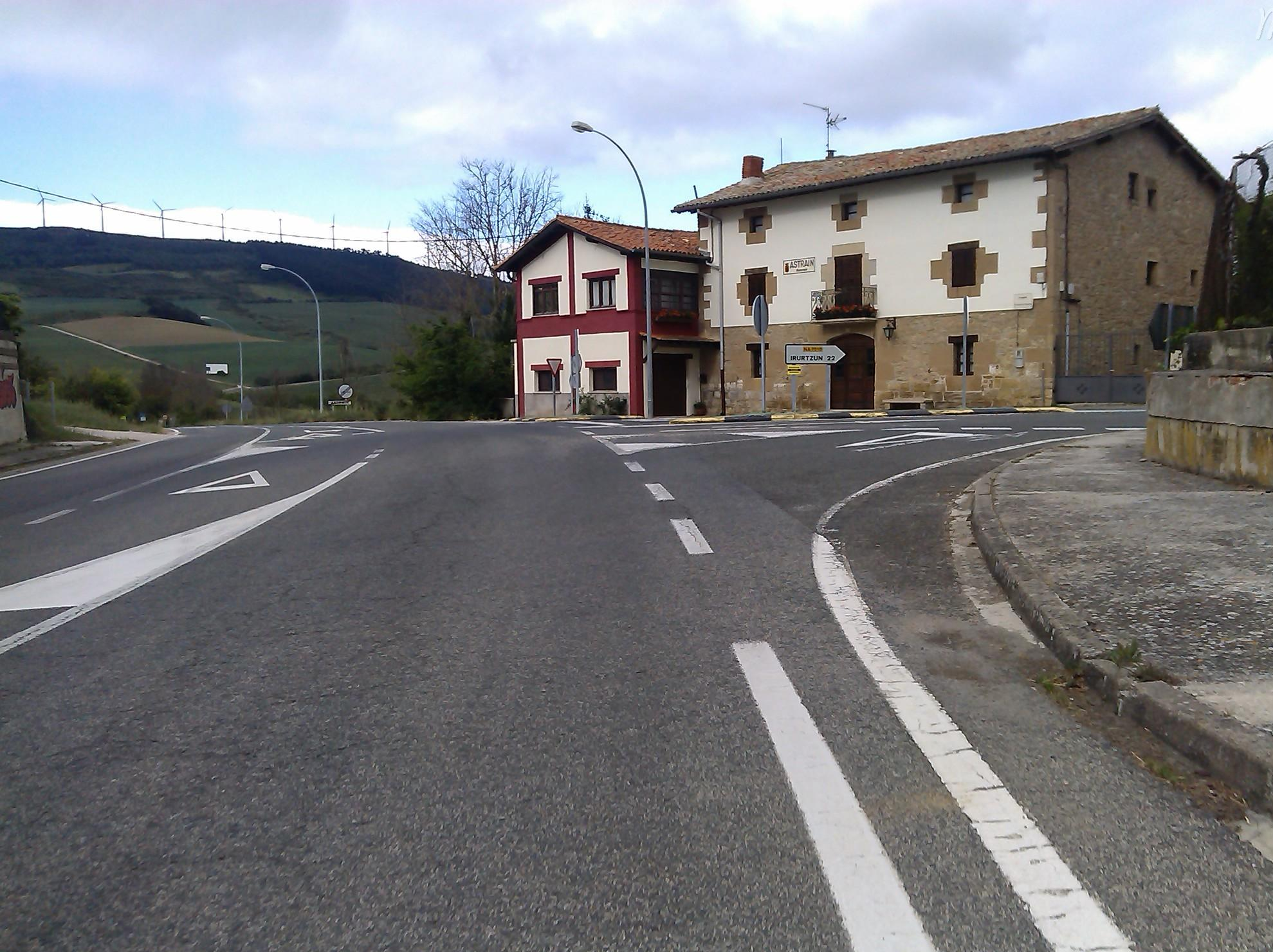

- Location within Navarre Location within Spain
- Coordinates: 42°45′27″N 1°44′25″W
- Country: Spain
- Community: Navarre
- Province: Navarre
- Municipality: Cizur
- Elevation: 521 m (1,709 ft)

Population
  - Total: 330

Astráin is a locality and council located in the municipality of Cizur, in Navarre province, Spain, Spain. As of 2020, it has a population of 330.

== Geography ==
Astráin is located 17km southwest of Pamplona.
