= Sebastiano Galeati =

Italian prelate

His Eminence Sebastiano Galeati
- Archbishop of Ravenna
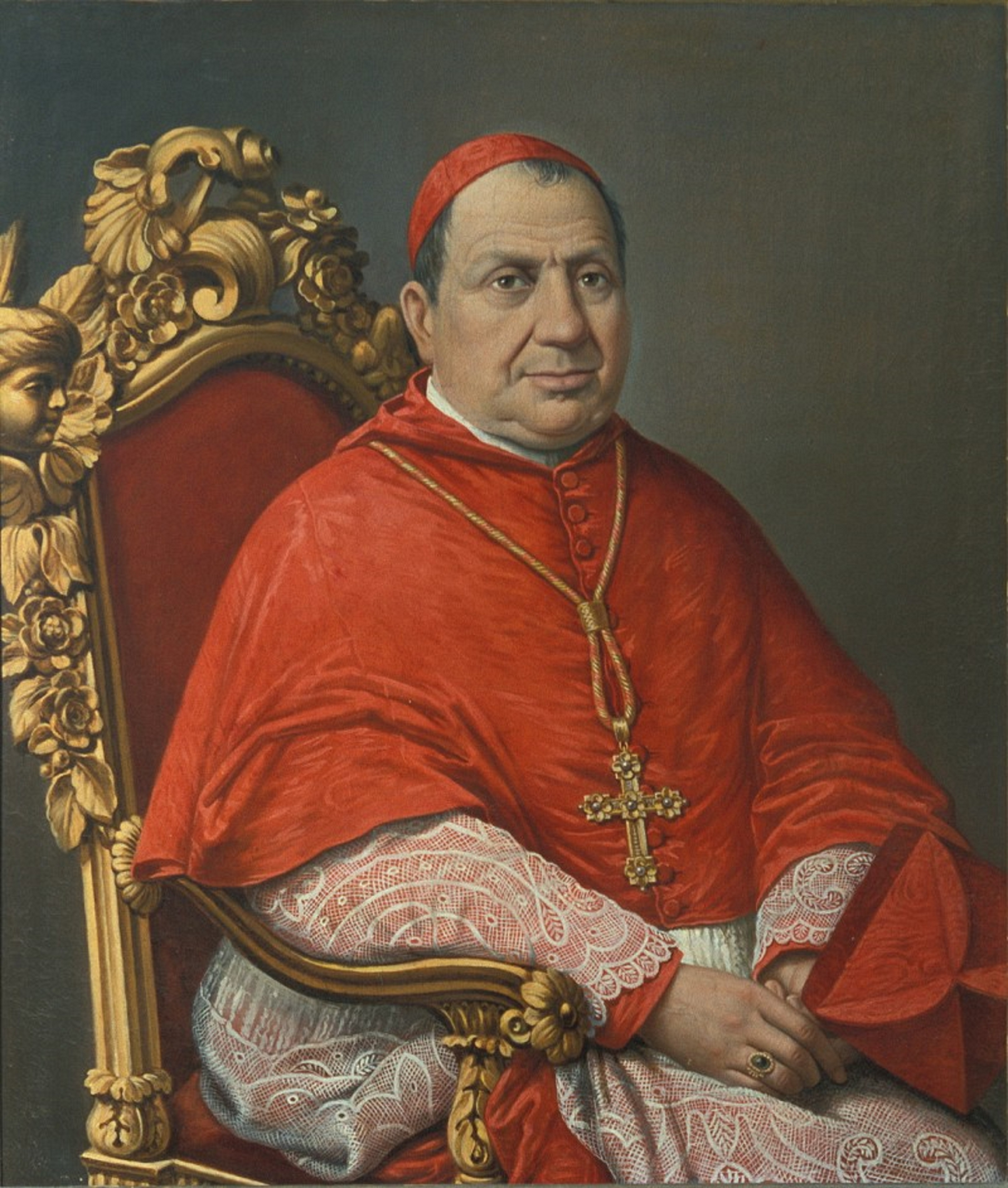
- Portrait
- Church: Roman Catholic Church
- Archdiocese: Ravenna
- See: Ravenna
- Appointed: 23 May 1887
- Term ended: 25 January 1901
- Predecessor: Giacomo Cattani
- Successor: Agostino Gaetano Riboldi
- Other post: Cardinal-Priest of San Lorenzo in Panisperna (1890-1901)
- Previous posts: Bishop of Macerata (1881-87); Bishop of Tolentino (1881-87)

Orders
- Ordination: 21 September 1844
- Consecration: 14 August 1881 by Raffaele Monaco La Valletta
- Created cardinal: 23 June 1890 by Pope Leo XIII
- Rank: Cardinal-Priest

Personal details
- Born: Sebastiano Galeati; 8 February 1822 Imola, Papal States
- Died: 25 January 1901 (aged 78) Ravenna, Kingdom of Italy
- Coat of arms

Sebastiano Galeati (8 February 1822 – 25 January 1901) was an Italian prelate of the Catholic Church who served as Bishop of Macerata and Tolentino from 1881 to 1887 and Archbishop of Ravenna from 1887 until his death. He was made a cardinal in 1890.

== Biography ==
Sebastiano Galeati was born in Imola on 8 February 1822.

He was ordained a priest on 21 September 1844.

On 4 August 1881, Pope Leo XIII appointed him Bishop of Macerata and Tolentino. He received his episcopal consecration from Cardinal Raffaele Monaco La Valletta on 14 August.

On 23 May 1887, he was named Archdiocese of Ravenna.

Pope Leo made him a cardinal on 23 June 1890 and then assigned him the titular church of San Lorenzo in Panisperna.

He died in Ravenna on 25 January 1901.
