= Giovanni Battista Bussi de Pretis =

Italian cardinal

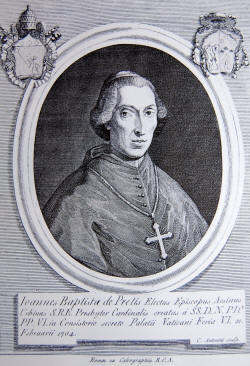
Giovanni Battista Bussi de Pretis

Giovanni Battista Bussi de Pretis (11 September 1721 in Urbino – 27 June 1800 in Jesi) was an Italian cleric promoted by Pope Pius VI to the rank of cardinal in the consistory of 21 February 1794. He replaced Buenaventura Fernández de Córdoba Spínola as Cardinal-Priest of San Lorenzo in Panisperna.
