= Pedro Portocarrero y Guzmán =

18th-century Roman Catholic bishop

Most Reverend Pedro Portocarrero y Guzmán
- Patriarch of West Indies; Titular Archbishop of Tyrus
- Church: Catholic Church
- In office: 1691–1708
- Predecessor: Antonio de Benavides y Bazán
- Successor: Carlos Borja Centellas y Ponce de León

Orders
- Consecration: 4 Nov 1691 by Luis Manuel Fernández de Portocarrero-Bocanegra y Moscoso-Osorio

Personal details
- Born: 1640 Montijo, Spain
- Died: 1708 (aged 67–68) Avignon, France

Pedro Portocarrero y Guzmán (1640–1708) was a Roman Catholic prelate who served as Patriarch of West Indies (1691–1708) and Titular Archbishop of Tyrus (1691–1708).

== Biography ==
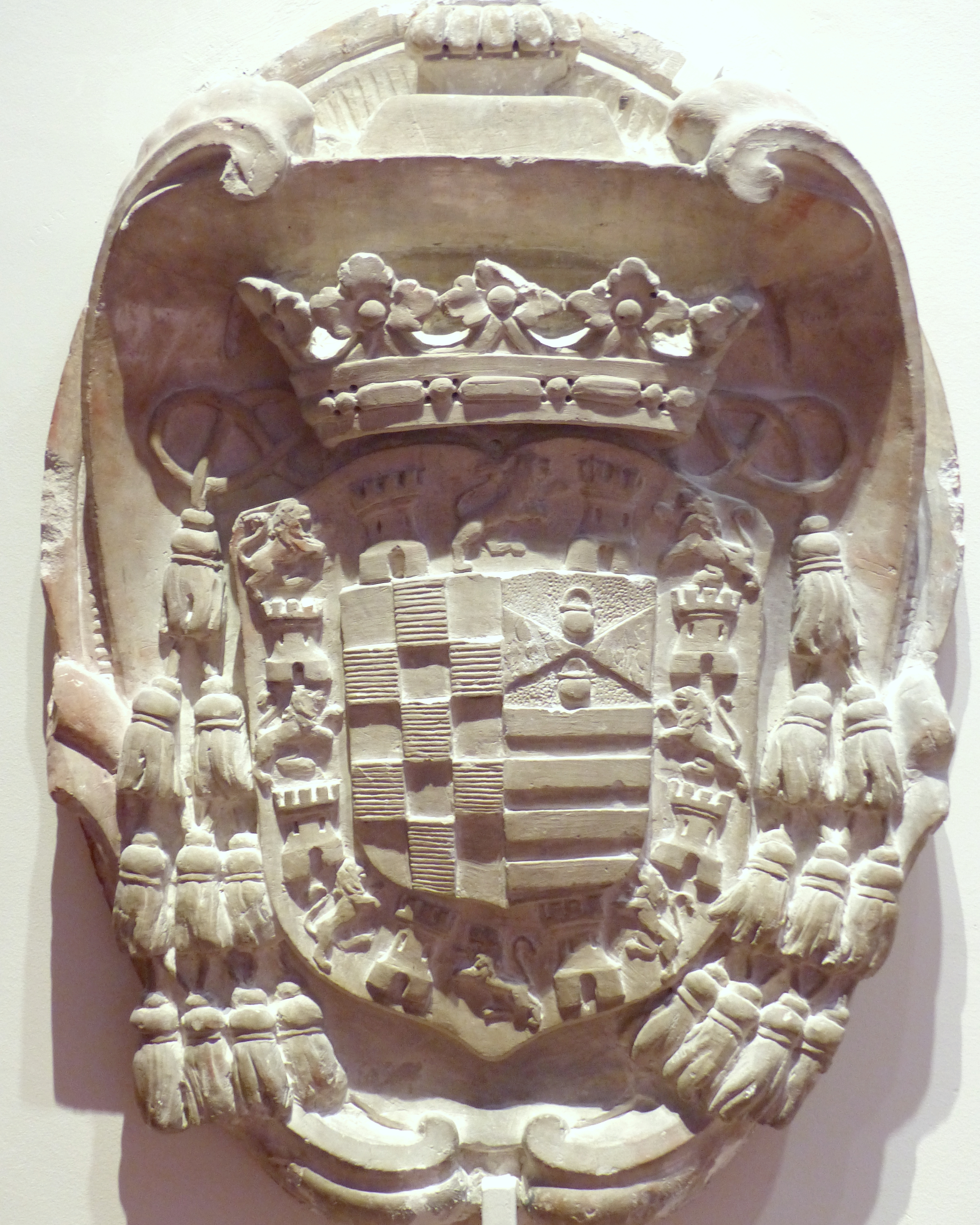
Calvet museum (Avignon), Portocarrero coat of arms

Pedro Portocarrero y Guzmán was born on February 27, 1640 in Montijo, Spain. On 27 Aug 1691, he was appointed during the papacy of Pope Innocent XII as Titular Archbishop of Tyrus. On 4 Nov 1691, he was consecrated bishop by Luis Manuel Fernández de Portocarrero-Bocanegra y Moscoso-Osorio, Archbishop of Toledo, with Fernando Guzmán, Bishop of Segovia, and Luis de Lemos y Usategui, Bishop of Concepción, serving as co-consecrators. On 12 Nov 1691, he was appointed during the papacy of Pope Innocent XII as Patriarch of West Indies. He served as Patriarch of West Indies until his death in 1708. In 1706 he left Madrid to settle in Avignon where he died on January 21, 1708.

== Episcopal succession ==
While bishop, he was the principal consecrator of:
- Gregorio Solórzano Castillo, Bishop of Ávila (1700);
- Silvestre García Escalona, Bishop of Tortosa (1702);
- Manuel Arias y Porres, Archbishop of Seville (1702);
- José Sicardo Martinez, Archbishop of Sassari (1702);
- Francisco de Cosío y Otero, Archbishop of Santafé en Nueva Granada (1704);
- Jerónimo Nosti de Valdés, Bishop of Puerto Rico (1704);
- Juan Bonilla Vargas, Bishop of Almería (1705); and
- Miguel Pérez Lara, Bishop of Coria (1705).

== External links and additional sources ==
- Cheney, David M. "Tyrus (Titular See)". Catholic-Hierarchy.org. (for Chronology of Bishops) ^{[self-published]}
- Chow, Gabriel. "Titular Metropolitan See of Tyrus (Lebanon)". GCatholic.org. (for Chronology of Bishops) ^{[self-published]}
- Cheney, David M. "Patriarchate of West Indies". Catholic-Hierarchy.org. (for Chronology of Bishops) ^{[self-published]}
- Chow, Gabriel. "Titular Patriarchal See of Indias Occidentales (Spain)". GCatholic.org. (for Chronology of Bishops) ^{[self-published]}

Catholic Church titles
Preceded by Antonio de Benavides y Bazán	Titular Archbishop of Tyrus; 1691–1705	Succeeded by Giovanni Battista Altieri (iuniore)
Preceded by Antonio de Benavides y Bazán	Patriarch of West Indies; 1691–1705	Succeeded by Carlos Borja Centellas y Ponce de León
