= Borox =

Coordinates: 40°04′N 3°44′W

- municipality
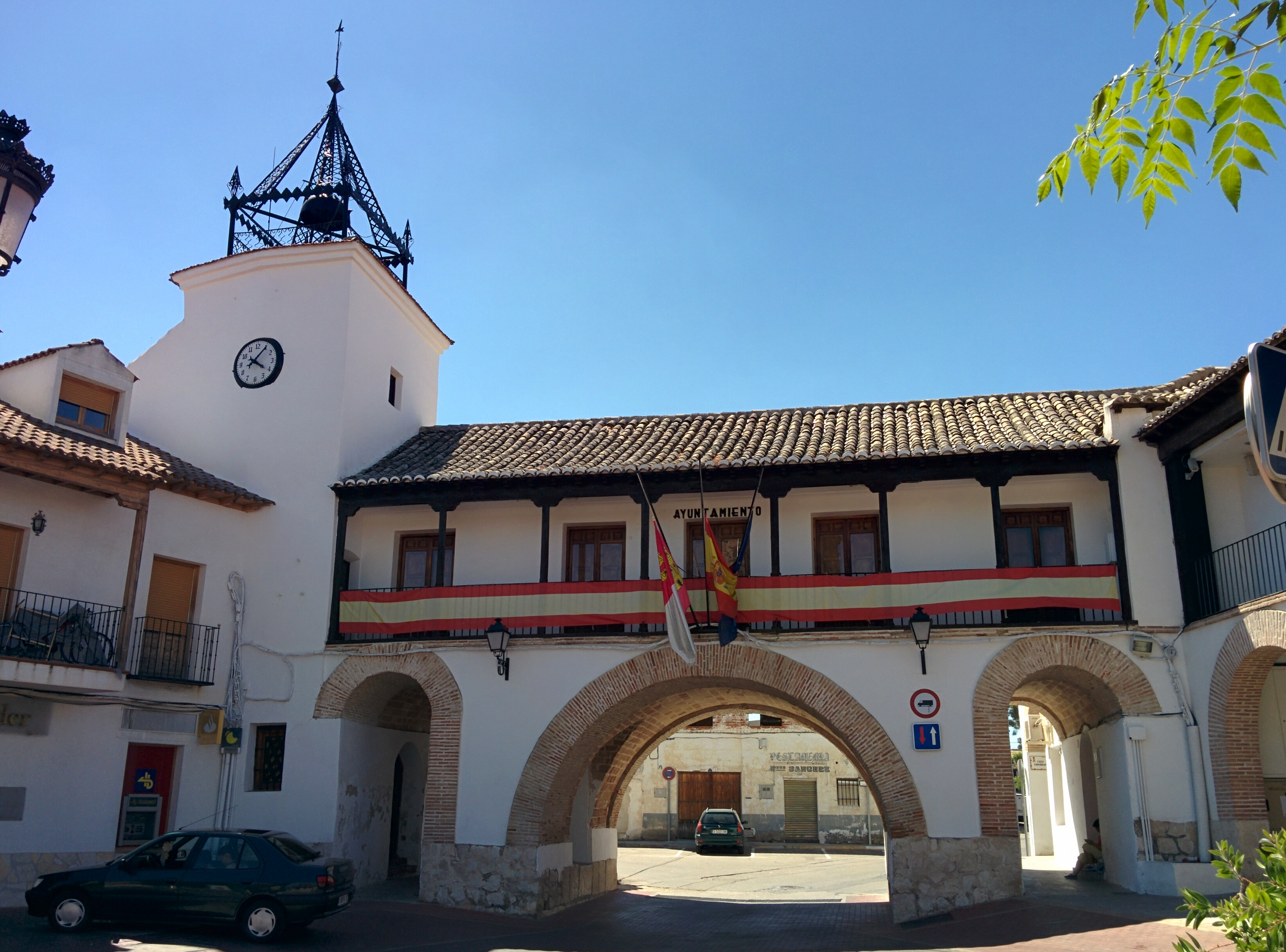

- Coat of arms

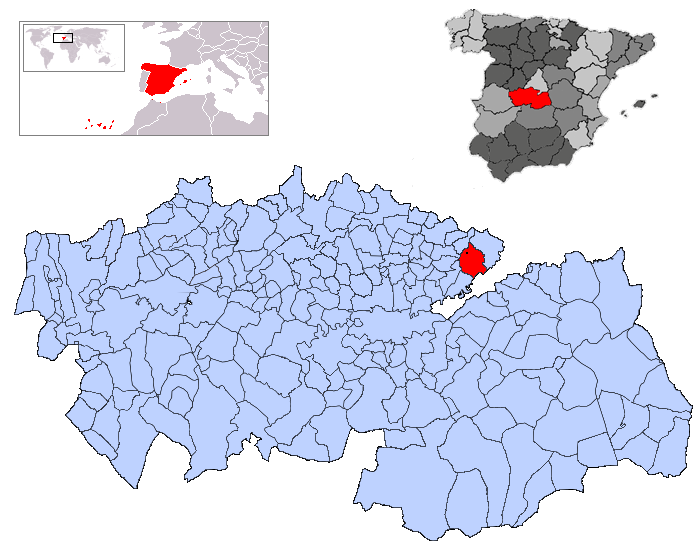
- Country: Spain
- Autonomous community: Castile-La Mancha
- Province: Toledo
- Municipality: Borox

Area
  - Total: 60 km^{2} (23 sq mi)
- Elevation: 580 m (1,900 ft)

Population (2025-01-01)
  - Total: 4,306
  - Density: 72/km^{2} (190/sq mi)
- Time zone: UTC+1 (CET)
  - Summer (DST): UTC+2 (CEST)

Borox is a municipality located in the province of Toledo, Castile-La Mancha, Spain. According to the 2006 census (INE), the municipality had a population of 2640 inhabitants.

== Demographics ==
Historical population
Year	Pop.	±%
1900	1,761	—
1910	1,857	+5.5%
1920	1,960	+5.5%
1930	2,255	+15.1%
1940	1,771	−21.5%
1950	2,108	+19.0%
1960	2,122	+0.7%
1970	2,063	−2.8%
1981	1,924	−6.7%
1991	1,940	+0.8%
2001	2,260	+16.5%
2011	3,435	+52.0%
2021	3,981	+15.9%
2023	4,114	+3.3%
Source: ISTAT
