= Pedro de Deza =

Spanish Roman Catholic cardinal and bishop

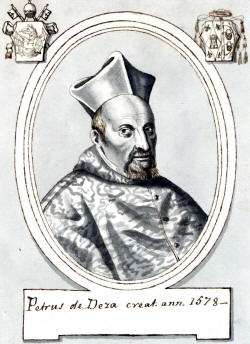

Pedro de Deza (1520–1600) was a Spanish Roman Catholic cardinal and bishop.

== Biography ==
=== Background ===
Pedro de Deza was born in Seville on 26 March 1520, the son of Antonio de Deza and Beatriz de Portugal. He was the nephew of Diego Deza, Archbishop of Seville and Grand Inquisitor of Spain.

He studied Latin under Juan Ulloa Pereira before attending the Colegio Viejo de San Bartolomé at the University of Salamanca, where he studied law. After completing his studies, he became a professor of law at the Colegio Viejo de San Bartolomé.

=== Early career ===
He spent eight years as the vicar general of the Archbishop of Santiago de Compostela. In 1556, he became an oidor in the Royal Audiencia and Chancillería of Valladolid. During the pontificate of Pope Paul IV (1555–59), he served as Archdeacon of Calatrava la Vieja. He was also an auditor of the Spanish Inquisition. In 1556, he became the president of the Kingdom of Granada, in which capacity he participated in the suppression of the Morisco Revolt of 1568–71. He became president of the Council of Valladolid in 1578.

=== Cardinal ===
On the recommendation of Philip II of Spain, Pope Gregory XIII made him a cardinal priest in the consistory of 21 February 1578. He received the red hat and the titular church of San Ciriaco alle Terme Diocleziane on 22 June 1580. He resided in Rome from 1580 on. On 9 January 1584 he opted for the titular church of Santa Prisca.

He participated in the papal conclave of 1585 that elected Pope Sixtus V. The new pope named him inquisitor general of the Roman Inquisition on 19 November 1586. On 20 April 1587 he opted for the titular church of Saint Jerome of the Croats. In 1590, he participated in both the first papal conclave of 1590 that elected Pope Urban VII, and in the second papal conclave of 1590 that elected Pope Gregory XIV. He went on to participate in the papal conclave of 1591 that elected Pope Innocent IX, and the papal conclave of 1592 that elected Pope Clement VIII.

On 18 August 1597 he opted for the titular church of San Lorenzo in Lucina. He became cardinal protopriest on 30 March 1598. He also served as the cardinal protector of Spain.

On 24 April 1600 he opted for the order of cardinal bishops, taking the suburbicarian see of Albano. He was consecrated as a bishop by Pope Clement VIII in St. Peter's Basilica on 18 June 1600.

He died in Rome on 27 August 1600. He was initially buried in San Lorenzo in Lucina. Later, according to the terms of his will, his remains were transferred provisionally to the hermitage of Villaguer in Toro, Zamora. Finally, he was buried in the convent of the Discalced Carmelites in Toro.

== See also ==
- Catholic Church in Spain

Records
Preceded by Scipione Lancelotti	Oldest living Member of the Sacred College; 21 June 1598 - 27 August 1600	Succeeded by Lucio Sassi
