= Simeone Tagliavia d'Aragonia =

Sicilian cardinal and bishop

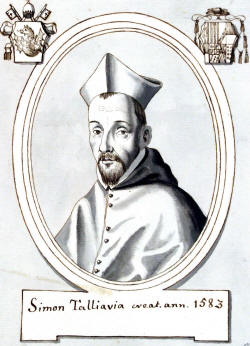
Simeone Tagliavia d'Aragonia

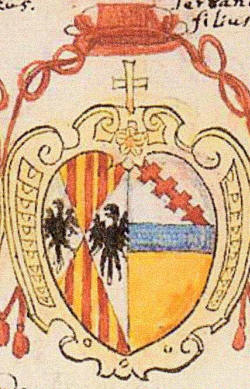
Coat of arms of Cardinal Simeone Tagliavia d'Aragonia

Simeone Tagliavia d'Aragonia (1550–1604) was a Sicilian cardinal and bishop.

== Biography ==
Simeone Tagliavia d'Aragonia was born in Castelvetrano, a family fief near Mazara del Vallo, Kingdom of Sicily on 20 May 1550, the son of Carlo d'Aragona Tagliavia, Viceroy of Sicily, and his wife Margherita Ventimiglia. He was the grand-nephew of Cardinal Pietro Tagliavia d'Aragonia.

At age 17, he was sent to Spain, where he studied at the University of Alcalá.

Pope Gregory XIII made him a cardinal deacon in the consistory of 12 December 1583. He did not participate in the papal conclave of 1585 that elected Pope Sixtus V. He received the red hat and the deaconry of Santa Maria degli Angeli e dei Martiri on 20 May 1585. That month, he was also appointed vice-protector of Spain.

He participated in the first papal conclave of 1590 that elected Pope Urban VII; in the second papal conclave of 1590 that elected Pope Gregory XIV; in the papal conclave of 1591 that elected Pope Innocent IX; and in the papal conclave of 1592 that elected Pope Clement VIII.

On 9 December 1592 he opted for the titular church of Sant'Anastasia; then for Saint Jerome of the Croats on 18 August 1597; then for Santa Prassede on 21 February 1600; and then for San Lorenzo in Lucina on 30 August 1600. He also became the protopriest.

On 17 June 1602 he opted for the order of cardinal bishops, receiving the Suburbicarian Diocese of Albano and being consecrated as a bishop. He opted for the Suburbicarian Diocese of Sabina on 19 February 1603.

He died in Rome on 20 May 1604. He was buried in the Church of the Gesù.
