= Filippo Spinola =

Italian Roman Catholic bishop and cardinal

Filippo Spinola (1 December 1535 – 20 August 1593) was an Italian Catholic bishop and cardinal.

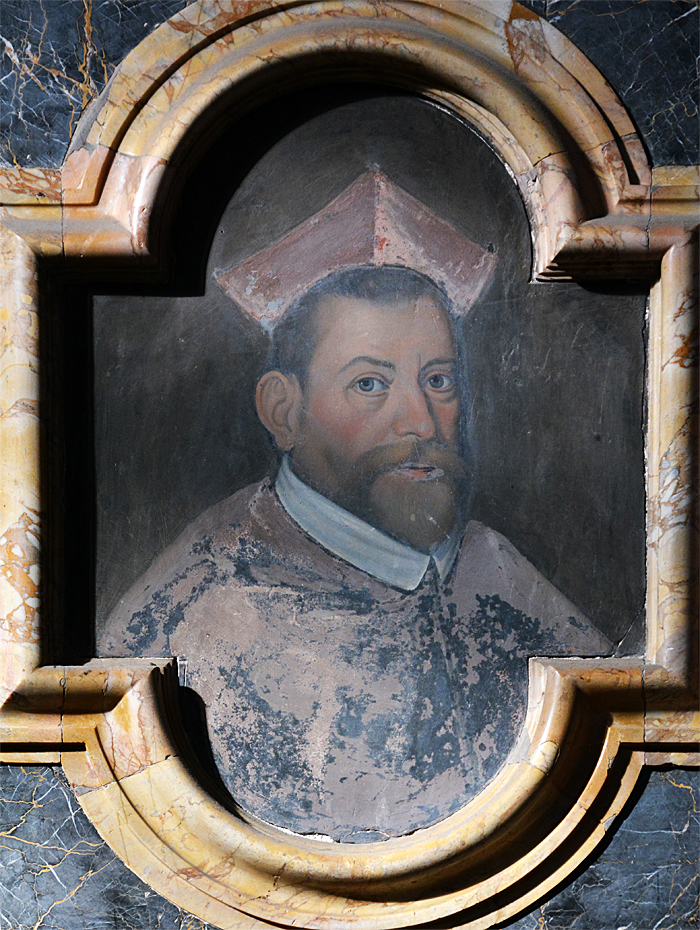
Filippo Spinola, Epitaph, Basilica Santa Sabina, Rome

== Biography ==
A member of the Spinola family, Filippo Spinola was born in Genoa on 1 December 1535, the son of Agostino Spinola, count of Tassarolo, and Gironima Albenga.

After serving the government of Genoa as a young man, Spinola moved to Rome, was ordained as a subdeacon, and became a Referendary of the Apostolic Signatura. He later became a domestic prelate of His Holiness.

On 8 February 1566 he was elected Bishop of Bisignano. He was consecrated as a bishop in the Pauline chapel of the Apostolic Palace by Cardinal Giambattista Cicada on 16 February 1566. On 9 March 1569 he was transferred to the see of Nola.

Pope Gregory XIII made him a cardinal priest in the consistory of 12 December 1583. He received the red hat and the titular church of Santa Sabina on 20 February 1584.

He participated in the papal conclave of 1585 that elected Pope Sixtus V. The new pope named him administrator of the see of Sora. On 13 May 1585 he was named papal legate in Perugia and Umbria; he held this legation a second time in 1591. He was also legate in the Duchy of Spoleto. He was also Prefect of the Sacred Congregation of Regulars, and Prefect of the pontifical galleys.

He participated in the first papal conclave of 1590 that elected Pope Urban VII; the second papal conclave of 1590 that elected Pope Gregory XIV; the papal conclave of 1591 that elected Pope Innocent IX; and the papal conclave of 1592 that elected Pope Clement VIII. He was a member of the cardinalate commission for Germany and the Kingdom of Hungary. When Cardinal Ludovico Madruzzo was not in Rome, Spinola served as cardinal protector for the Holy Roman Empire.

He died in Rome on 20 August 1593 and was buried in his titular church of Santa Sabina. His remains were later transferred to Genoa.
