= 1585 conclave =

Election of Catholic Pope Sixtus V

Papal conclave April 1585

Dates and location
- 21–24 April 1585; Apostolic Palace, Papal States

Key officials
- Dean: Alessandro Farnese
- Camerlengo: Filippo Guastavillani

Elected pope
- Felice Peretti; Name taken: Sixtus V
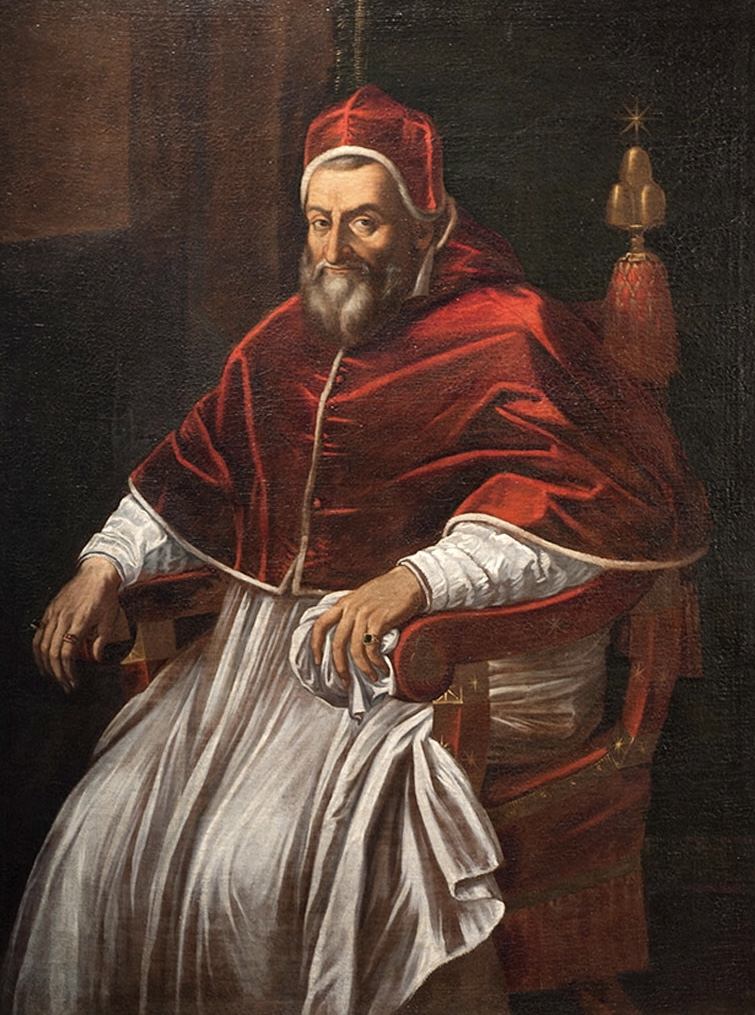

The 1585 papal conclave (21–24 April), convoked after the death of Pope Gregory XIII, elected Cardinal Felice Peretti, who took the name Sixtus V. Forty-two of the sixty cardinals participated in the conclave. The absence of thirty percent of the cardinalate makes this conclave one of the most sparsely attended in the history of the modern Roman Catholic Church. Fourteen of Gregory XIII's thirty cardinals failed to attend, a startlingly high number.

== Proceedings ==
The conclave began in the Vatican on 21 April, Easter Sunday. At the opening ceremonies, out of sixty living cardinals thirty-nine were in attendance. Three more arrived later, in time to cast a vote: Andreas of Austria, Ludovico Madruzzo of Trent, and Guido Luca Ferrero of Vercelli. Two factions quickly formed. The first was led by Cardinal Ferdinando de' Medici and the second by Luigi d'Este (grandson of King Louis XII of France). They were willing to combine to make a pope, but it depended on whether they could agree on a common candidate.

Early voting seemed to favour Cardinals Pier Donato Cesi and Guglielmo Sirleto, but by the next morning they had been abandoned. Wanting to avoid the potential influence of cardinals who had not yet arrived, Medici then proposed two names to D' Este: those of Cardinals Albani and Montalto, and invited him to choose. D' Este imposed conditions, however, and the projected deal, when news got out, caused much indignation. Through a series of misdirections and stratagems, Medici convinced the cardinals that Montalto was not his candidate.

Ludovico Cardinal Madruzzo, who was the designated leader of the Spanish faction, then arrived in Rome and had conversations with the Spanish and Imperial ambassadors before he entered conclave. Meeting immediately with d' Este, Madruccio learned of d' Este's dislike of his own favorite, Sirleto. Considering that a completely pro-Spanish pope would be as unpalatable as a completely pro-French one, he therefore declared himself to d'Este to be against Cardinal Albani, and thus in favor of Montalto. Altemps, Medici and Gesualdo then put pressure on Madruccio as well, and he was won over. As leader of the Spanish interest, he brought his own influence to bear on Andrew of Austria, Colonna, Deza (Seza), Gonzaga, Sfondrati and Spinola. With all of these adherents, Medici and d'Este still needed four votes. These could only be had in the group of Gregory XIII's cardinals organized by Alessandro Farnese, the Dean of the College of Cardinals. During that night, Cardinal Ferrero arrived.

On 24 April, Medici explained to Montalto all that had been done, and advised him as to how affairs should be conducted. D'Este met with Farnese, who believed that Montalto had no voting strength, and managed to further misdirect him. During a meeting in the Pauline Chapel, d' Este recruited Guastavillani, the Cardinal Camerlengo; Giambattista Castagna, the Cardinal of San Marcello; and Francesco Sforza. When the cardinals finally assembled in the Sistine Chapel, d' Este declared that it was not necessary to proceed to a ballot, since it was obvious who the new pope was. Without opposition the cardinals proceeded to do homage ('adoration') to Felice Cardinal Peretti though, immediately afterwards, a vote was conducted by asking each cardinal to cast his vote aloud. The vote was unanimous. Cardinal François de Joyeuse arrived in Rome too late to participate in the Conclave.

The coronation of Sixtus V took place on May 1. As senior cardinal deacon Cardinal de' Medici placed the tiara on his head. On May 5, he took possession of the Lateran.

== Composition of the conclave ==
=== Participants ===
- Alessandro Farnese, Bishop of Ostia and Velletri, Dean of the College of Cardinals
- Giacomo Savelli, Vicar of Rome, Bishop of Porto and Santa Rufina
- Giovanni Antonio Serbelloni, Bishop of Frascati
- Alfonso Gesualdo, Bishop of Albano
- Gianfrancesco Gambara, Bishop of Palestrina
- Girolamo Simoncelli
- Mark Sittich von Hohenems Altemps, Bishop of Constance
- Luigi d'Este, Archbishop of Auch
- Ludovico Madruzzo
- Innico d'Avalos d'Aragona
- Ferdinando de' Medici
- Marco Antonio Colonna
- Tolomeo Gallio
- Prospero Santacroce
- Guido Luca Ferrero
- Guglielmo Sirleto
- Gabriele Paleotti, Archbishop of Bologna
- Michele Bonelli
- Antonio Carafa
- Giulio Antonio Santorio
- Pier Donato Cesi
- Charles d'Angennes de Rambouillet, Bishop of Le Mans
- Felice Peretti Montalto OFM (elected as Pope Sixtus V)
- Girolamo Rusticucci
- Nicolas de Pellevé, Archbishop of Sens
- Gian Girolamo Albani
- Filippo Boncompagni
- Filippo Guastavillani, Camerlengo
- Andrea d'Austria, Bishop of Brixen
- Alessandro Riario, Titular Patriarch of Alexandria
- Pedro de Deza
- Giovanni Vincenzo Gonzaga
- Giovanni Antonio Facchinetti de Nuce, Patriarch of Jerusalem
- Giambattista Castagna, Papal Legate to Bologna
- Alessandro Ottaviano de' Medici, Archbishop of Florence
- Giulio Canani, Bishop of Adria
- Niccolò Sfondrati, Bishop of Cremona
- Antonmaria Salviati
- Filippo Spinola, Bishop of Nola
- Matthieu Cointerel,
- Scipione Lancelotti
- Francesco Sforza

=== Absent cardinals ===
The following cardinals did not attend the conclave:

- Niccolò Caetani.
- Georges d'Armagnac, archbishop of Toulouse, France.
- Charles II de Bourbon-Vendôme, archbishop of Rouen, France.
- Antoine Perrenot de Granvelle, archbishop of Besançon, France, and bishop of Sabina.
- Albrecht von Austria.
- Louis II de Guise, archbishop of Reims, France.
- Charles II de Lorraine de Vaudémont, administrator of Toul, and Verdun, France.
- Gaspar de Quiroga y Vela, archbishop of Toledo, Spain.
- Rodrigo de Castro Osorio, archbishop of Seville, Spain.
- François de Joyeuse, archbishop of Narbonne, France.
- Michele Della Torre, bishop of Ceneda.
- Agostino Valier, bishop of Verona.
- Vincenzo Lauro, bishop of Mondovi.
- Alberto Bolognetti, Bishop of Massa Marittima.
- Jerzy Radziwill, bishop of Wilno, Lithuania.
- Simeone Tagliavia d'Aragonia.
- Charles III de Bourbon de Vendôme, coadjutor archbishop of Rouen, France.
- Andrew Báthory, bishop of Ermland, Prussia.

== Sources ==
- Ludwig von Pastor, History of the Popes vol. XIX, London 1930
- Giuseppe de Novaes, Elementi della storia de' sommi pontefici da San Pietro sino al ... Pio Papa VII; third edition, Volume 8 (Roma 1822) 103–106.
- L. Ranke, The Ecclesiastical and Political History of the Popes of Rome during the sixteenth and seventeenth centuries Volume I (tr. S. Austin) (Philadelphia 1841)
- Giovanni Leti, Vita di Sisto Quinto, pontefice romano Volume II (Torino 1852) 40–86
