= 1592 conclave =

Election of Catholic Pope Clement VIII

Papal conclave January 1592

Dates and location
- 10–30 January 1592; Apostolic Palace, Papal States

Key officials
- Dean: Alfonso Gesualdo
- Sub-dean: Innico d'Avalos d'Aragona
- Camerlengo: Enrico Caetani
- Protopriest: Mark Sittich von Hohenems
- Protodeacon: Andreas von Österreich

Election
- Ballots: 20

Elected pope
- Ippolito Aldobrandini; Name taken: Clement VIII
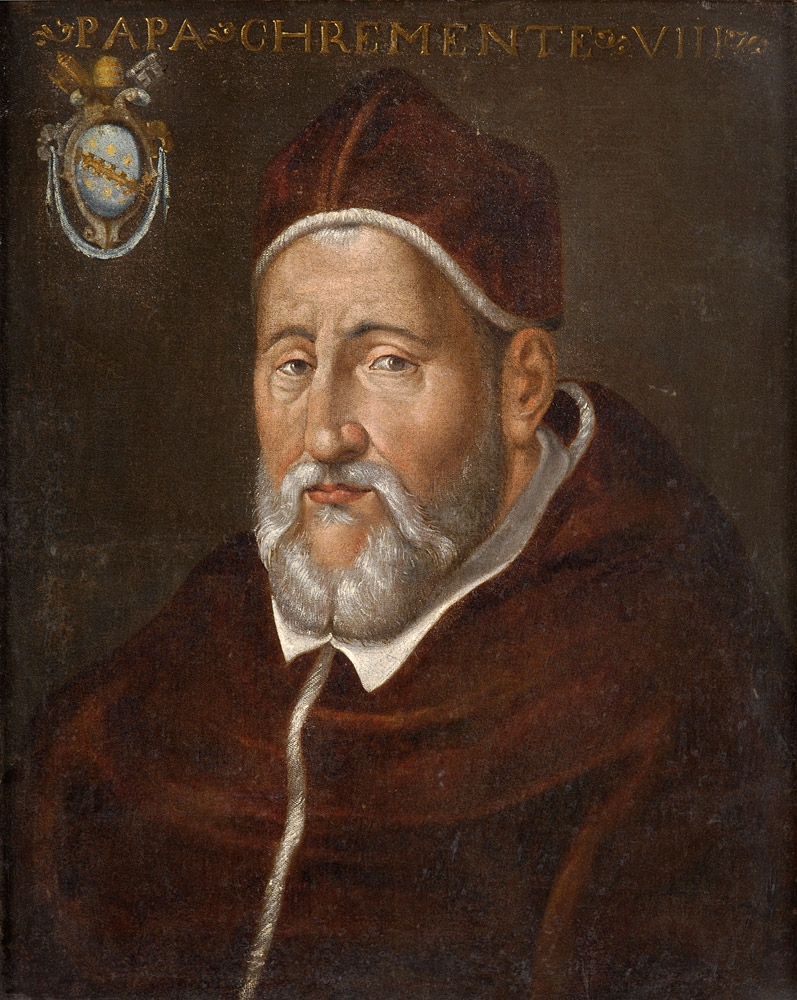

The 1592 papal conclave (10–30 January) elected Pope Clement VIII in succession to Pope Innocent IX.

== Death of Innocent IX ==
Pope Innocent IX died on December 30, 1591, only two months into his pontificate. This created the fourth sede vacante in the year and a half since the death of Pope Sixtus V, who had died on August 27, 1590. He was then succeeded by Pope Urban VII (September 15 – September 27, 1590), Pope Gregory XIV (December 5, 1590 – October 16, 1591) and Innocent IX (October 29 – December 30, 1591), so the papal conclave of January 1592 was the fourth in only seventeen months. No similar situation had occurred since 1276–1277.

== List of participants ==
Fifty four of the sixty four cardinals participated in this conclave:

- Alfonso Gesualdo (created cardinal on February 26, 1561) – Cardinal-Bishop of Ostia e Velletri; Dean of the Sacred College of Cardinals; Prefect of the S.C. of Ceremonies; Prefect of the S.C. of Rites; Cardinal-protector of the Kingdom of Portugal and the Kingdom of Sicily
- Innico d'Avalos d'Aragona, O.S.Iacobis. (February 26, 1561) – Cardinal-Bishop of Porto e Santa Rufina; Sub-dean of the Sacred College of Cardinals
- Marco Antonio Colonna (March 12, 1565) – Cardinal-Bishop of Palestrina; Librarian of the Holy Roman Church
- Tolomeo Gallio (March 12, 1565) – Cardinal-Bishop of Frascati
- Gabriele Paleotti (March 12, 1565) – Cardinal-Bishop of Sabina; Archbishop of Bologna
- Michele Bonelli, O.P. (March 6, 1566) – Cardinal-Bishop of Albano; Prefect of the S.C. of the Bishops and Regulars; Cardinal-protector of the Order of Dominicans
- Markus Sitticus von Hohenems (February 26, 1561) – Cardinal-Priest of S. Maria in Trastevere; Protopriest of the Sacred College of Cardinals; Archpriest of the patriarchal Lateran Basilica
- Ludovico Madruzzo (February 26, 1561) – Cardinal-Priest of S. Lorenzo in Lucina; Bishop of Trento; Cardinal-protector of Germany and Spain
- Girolamo Simoncelli (December 22, 1553) – Cardinal-Priest of S. Prisca; Administrator of the see of Orvieto
- Giulio Antonio Santori (May 17, 1570) – Cardinal-Priest of S. Bartolomeo all’Isola; Grand Inquisitor of the Supreme S.C. of the Roman and Universal Inquisition; Archbishop of Santa Severina; Cardinal-protector of the Order of Capuchins and of the Greek Catholic Church
- Girolamo Rusticucci (May 17, 1570) – Cardinal-Priest of S. Susanna; Vicar General of Rome; Camerlengo of the Sacred College of Cardinals; Cardinal-protector of the Order of Cistercians
- Nicolas de Pellevé (May 17, 1570) – Cardinal-Priest of S. Prassede; Archbishop of Sens and Archbishop of Reims; Cardinal-protector of Ireland
- Pedro de Deza (February 21, 1578) – Cardinal-Priest of S. Girolamo degli Schiavoni
- Alessandro Ottaviano de' Medici (December 12, 1583) – Cardinal-Priest of SS. Giovanni e Paolo; Archbishop of Florence
- François de Joyeuse (December 12, 1583) – Cardinal-Priest of SS. Trinita al Monte Pincio; Archbishop of Toulouse; Cardinal-protector of the Kingdom of France
- Giulio Canani (December 12, 1583) – Cardinal-Priest of S. Anastasia; Bishop of Modena
- Anton Maria Salviati (December 12, 1583) – Cardinal-Priest of S. Maria della Pace
- Agostino Valier (December 12, 1583) – Cardinal-Priest of S. Marco; Bishop of Verona
- Vincenzo Lauro (December 12, 1583) – Cardinal-Priest of S. Clemente; Bishop of Mondovi; Cardinal-protector of Scotland
- Filippo Spinola (December 12, 1583) – Cardinal-Priest of S. Sabina; Legate in Spoleto
- Jerzy Radziwiłł (December 12, 1583) – Cardinal-Priest of S. Sisto; Bishop of Kraków
- Scipione Lancelotti (December 12, 1583) – Cardinal-Priest of S. Salvatore in Lauro; Secretary of the Apostolic Briefs
- Enrico Caetani (December 18, 1585) – Cardinal-Priest of S. Pudenziana; Camerlengo of the Holy Roman Church; Latin Patriarch of Alexandria; Prefect of the Congregation for French affairs
- Giovanni Battista Castrucci (December 18, 1585) – Cardinal-Priest of S. Maria in Aracoeli
- Domenico Pinelli (December 18, 1585) – Cardinal-Priest of S. Crisogono; Archpriest of the patriarchal Liberian Basilica; Papal legate in Perugia and Umbria; Cardinal-protector of the Order of Carmelites
- Ippolito Aldobrandini (December 18, 1585) – Cardinal-Priest of S. Pancrazio; Grand penitentiary
- Girolamo della Rovere (November 16, 1586) – Cardinal-Priest of S. Pietro in Vincoli; Archbishop of Turin
- Girolamo Bernerio, O.P. (November 16, 1586) – Cardinal-Priest of S. Maria sopra Minerva; Bishop of Ascoli-Piceno; Cardinal-protector of the Order of Servites
- Antonio Maria Gallio (November 16, 1586) – Cardinal-Priest of S. Agnese in Agone; Bishop of Osimo
- Costanzo Buttafoco da Sarnano, O.F.M.Conv. (November 16, 1586) – Cardinal-Priest of S. Pietro in Montorio
- Benedetto Giustiniani (November 16, 1586) – Cardinal-Priest of S. Marcello; Prefect of the Tribunal of the Apostolic Signature of Grace; Legate in Marche; Vice-protector of the Kingdom of France
- William Allen (August 7, 1587) – Cardinal-Priest of S. Silvestro a Martino ai Monti
- Scipione Gonzaga (December 18, 1587) – Cardinal-Priest of S. Maria del Popolo; Latin Patriarch of Jerusalem
- Antonio Maria Sauli (December 18, 1587) – Cardinal-Priest of S. Stefano al Monte Celio
- Giovanni Evangelista Pallotta (December 18, 1587) – Cardinal-Priest of S. Mateo in Merulana; Archpriest of the patriarchal Vatican Basilica
- Giovan Francesco Morosini (July 15, 1588) – Cardinal-Priest of S. Maria in Via; Bishop of Brescia; Cardinal-protector of Hungary
- Francesco Maria Del Monte (December 14, 1588) – Cardinal-Priest of SS. Quirico e Giulitta
- Agostino Cusani (December 14, 1588) – Cardinal-Priest of S. Lorenzo in Pansiperna
- Mariano Pierbenedetti (December 20, 1589) – Cardinal-Priest of SS. Marcellino e Pietro
- Gregorio Petrocchini, O.E.S.A. (December 20, 1589) – Cardinal-Priest of S. Agostino
- Paolo Emilio Sfondrati (December 19, 1590) – Cardinal-Priest of S. Cecilia; Legate a latere in Bologna and Romagna; Prefect of the Supreme Tribunal of the Apostolic Signature of Justice
- Ottavio Paravicini (March 6, 1591) – Cardinal-Priest of S. Giovanni a Porta Latina; Bishop of Alessandria
- Andreas von Österreich (November 19, 1576) – Cardinal-Deacon of S. Maria Nuova; Protodeacon of the Sacred College of Cardinals; Bishop of Constance and bishop of Brixen; Cardinal-protector of Austria
- Simeone Tagliavia d'Aragonia (December 12, 1583) – Cardinal-Deacon of S. Maria degli Angeli; Vice-protector of the Kingdom of Spain
- Francesco Sforza di Santa Fiora (December 12, 1583) – Cardinal-Deacon of S. Maria in Via Lata; Legate in Romagna
- Alessandro Peretti Montalto Damasceni (May 13, 1585) – Cardinal-Deacon of S. Lorenzo in Damaso; Vice-Chancellor of the Holy Roman Church; Legate in Bologna; Cardinal-protector of the Kingdom of Poland; Cardinal-protector of the orders of Benedictines and Celestines
- Girolamo Mattei (November 16, 1586) – Cardinal-Deacon of S. Eustachio; Prefect of the S.C. of the Tridentine Council
- Ascanio Colonna (November 16, 1586) – Cardinal-Deacon of S. Maria in Cosmedin
- Federico Borromeo (December 18, 1587) – Cardinal-Deacon of S. Nicola in Carcere Tulliano
- Guido Pepoli (December 20, 1589) – Cardinal-Deacon of SS. Cosma e Damiano
- Ottavio d'Aquaviva (March 6, 1591) – Cardinal-Deacon of S. Giorgio in Velabro; Legate in Campagna and Marittima
- Odoardo Farnese (March 6, 1591) – Cardinal-Deacon of S. Adriano
- Flaminio Piatti (March 6, 1591) – Cardinal-Deacon of S. Maria in Domnica
- Giovanni Antonio Facchinetti de Nuce (December 18, 1591) – Cardinal-Deacon with no deaconry assigned; Secretary of State and Superintendent general of the Papal States

Twenty three electors were created by Sixtus V, thirteen by Gregory XIII, seven by Pius IV, five by Gregory XIV, four by Pius V, one by Innocent IX and one by Pope Julius III.

== Absentees ==
Ten cardinals were absent:

- Gaspar Quiroga y Vela (December 15, 1578) – Cardinal-Priest of S. Balbina; Archbishop of Toledo; Inquisitor General of the Spanish Inquisition
- Rodrigo de Castro de Lemos (December 12, 1583) – Cardinal-Priest of SS. XII Apostoli; Archbishop of Seville
- Philippe de Lenoncourt (November 16, 1586) – Cardinal-Priest of S. Onofrio; Prefect of the S.C. of Index
- Pierre de Gondi (December 18, 1587) – Cardinal-Priest of S. Silvestro in Capite; Bishop of Paris
- Filippo Sega (December 18, 1591) – Cardinal-Priest with no title assigned; Bishop of Piacenza; Legate in France
- Albrecht VII Habsburg (March 3, 1577) – Cardinal-Deacon of S. Croce in Gerusalemme; Inquisitor General of the Portuguese Inquisition; Viceroy of Portugal
- Charles III de Bourbon de Vendôme II (December 12, 1583) – Cardinal-Deacon with no deaconry assigned; Archbishop of Rouen
- Andrzej Batory (July 4, 1584) – Cardinal-Deacon of S. Angelo in Pescheria; Bishop of Warmia
- Hughes de Loubenx de Verdalle, O.S.Io.Hieros. (December 18, 1587) – Cardinal-Deacon of S. Maria in Portico; Grand Master of the Knights Hospitaller
- Charles III de Lorraine-Vaudémont (December 20, 1589) – Cardinal-Deacon of S. Agata in Suburra; Bishop of Metz; Papal Legate in Lorraine

Five of these were created by Gregory XIII, four by Sixtus V and one by Innocent IX.

== Divisions in the Sacred College and the main candidates ==
The Sacred College of Cardinals was divided into several factions. The strongest of them was the Spanish faction with Madruzzo as unofficial leader. They supported the interests of king Philip II of Spain. Their candidate was Giulio Antonio Santori, head of the Roman Inquisition, called Cardinal S. Severina. His candidature was supported also by the "Sixtine" party, which included the old favourites and circle of Pope Sixtus V; their leader was Sixtus's cardinal-nephew, Alessandro Peretti de Montalto, Vice-Chancellor of the Church. Montalto supported Santori as a tactical manoeuvre and his real candidate was Aldobrandini. There was also a numerous group of cardinals that openly opposed Santori. Most of them were the old circles of Gregory XIII and Pius IV and their leaders were Sforza, Hohenems and Marcantonio Colonna.

Since in the previous two conclaves the candidates supported by Spain had won, it was generally thought that also this time only pro-Spanish papabile had any prospects of winning the election. Besides Santori, only Madruzzo, Tolomeo Gallio, Paleotti, Marco Antonio Colonna and Aldobrandini were acceptable to Spain and it seemed clear that the new Pope would be one of these. Aldobrandini's candidacy was secretly engineered by the French ally Ferdinand I, Grand Duke of Tuscany, and Philip II of Spain remained unaware of it.

== The conclave ==
The conclave began on January 10, 1592. The next morning Madruzzo and Montalto together with their adherents tried to elect Santori by acclamation, but their plan failed due to strong opposition from Hohenems and his party. Afterwards the normal voting procedures were followed. Every day a vote took place, with the following results:

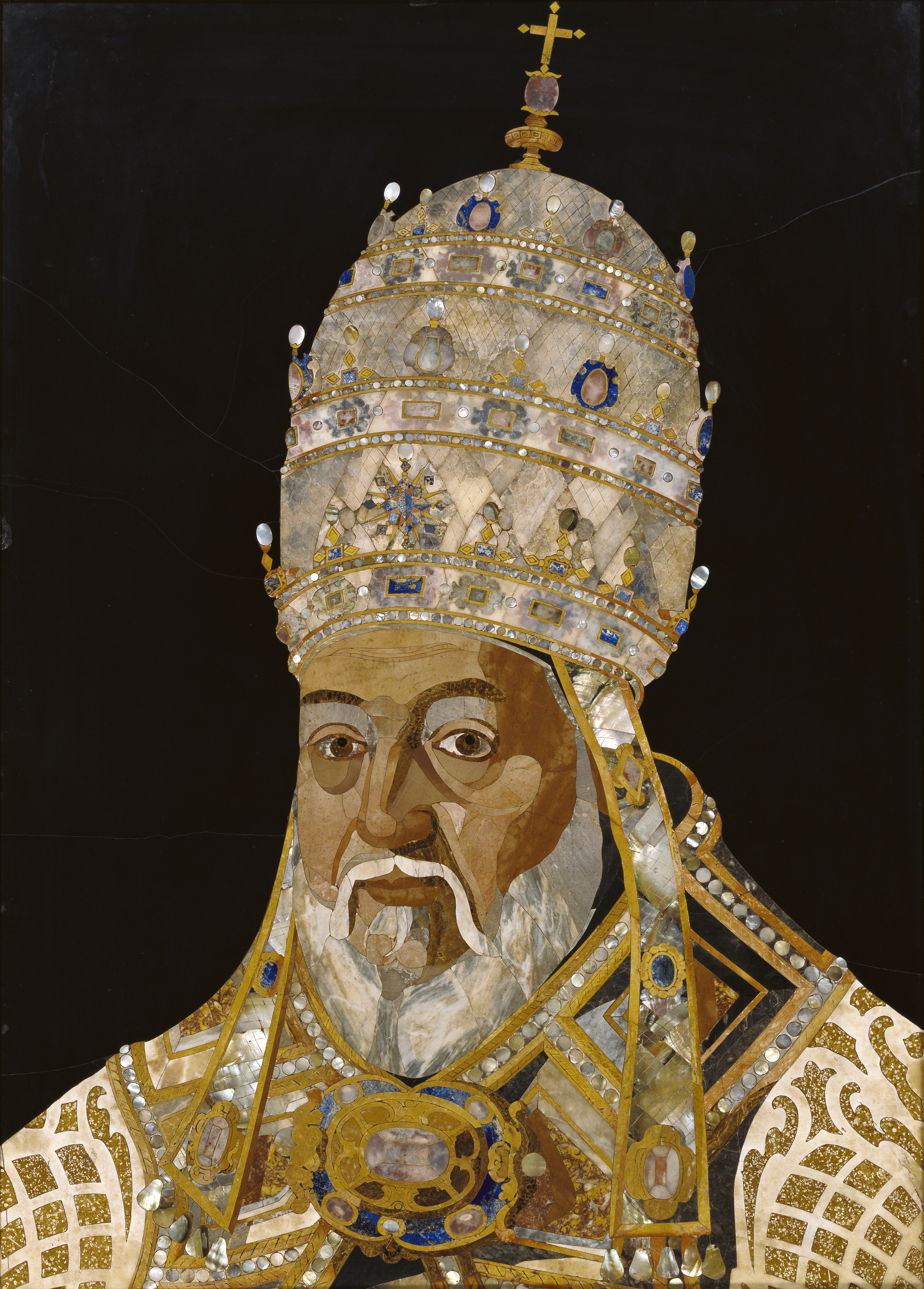
Cardinal Ippolito Aldobrandini was elected Pope Clement VIII.

- January 11 – Santori – 28, Aldobrandini - 11
- January 12 – Santori – 23, Aldobrandini - 18
- January 13 – Santori – 23, Aldobrandini - 18
- January 14 – Santori – 24, Aldobrandini - 9
- January 15 – Santori – 21, Aldobrandini - 13
- January 16 – Santori – 22, Aldobrandini - 13
- January 17 – Santori – 23, Aldobrandini - 13
- January 18 – ?
- January 19 – Santori – 23, Aldobrandini - 12
- January 20 – Santori – 22, Aldobrandini - 15
- January 21 – Santori – 23, Aldobrandini - 17
- January 22 – Santori – 23, Aldobrandini - 12
- January 23 – Madruzzo – 21, Santori – 18
- January 24 – Santori – 18, Aldobrandini and Madruzzo – 16 each
- January 25 – Santori and Aldobrandini – 19 each
- January 26 – Santori – 18, Madruzzo - 16
- January 27 – Santori – 21, Madruzzo – 16
- January 28 – Aldobrandini – 17, Santori and Madruzzo – 15 each
- January 29 – Santori – 17, Aldobrandini – 16

Santori received the greatest number of votes in almost every ballot, but was not able to secure the required majority of two-thirds and support for him gradually diminished. Eventually on January 29, Cardinal Montalto decided to switch to support the candidature of Ippolito Aldobrandini and was able to secure significant votes for him. Madruzzo then accepted that the opposition against him was too strong and he also switched to Aldobrandini as being more acceptable than Santori. This was the decisive moment of this conclave.

== Election of Clement VIII ==
On January 30, 1592, Cardinal Ippolito Aldobrandini was unanimously elected to the papacy and took the name of Clement VIII. On February 2 he was consecrated to the episcopate by Cardinal Alfonso Gesualdo, bishop of Ostia and Velletri and Dean of the College of Cardinals. Seven days later he was solemnly crowned by Francesco Sforza di Santa Fiora, deacon of S. Maria in Via Lata.

== Sources ==
- List of participants of conclave of 1592 by S. Miranda
- Vatican History: Konklave 1592 (in German)
- The Triple Crown
