= Francesco Maria del Monte =

Italian Cardinal, diplomat and arts patron (1549–1627)

His Eminence Francesco Maria del Monte
- Dean of the College of Cardinals
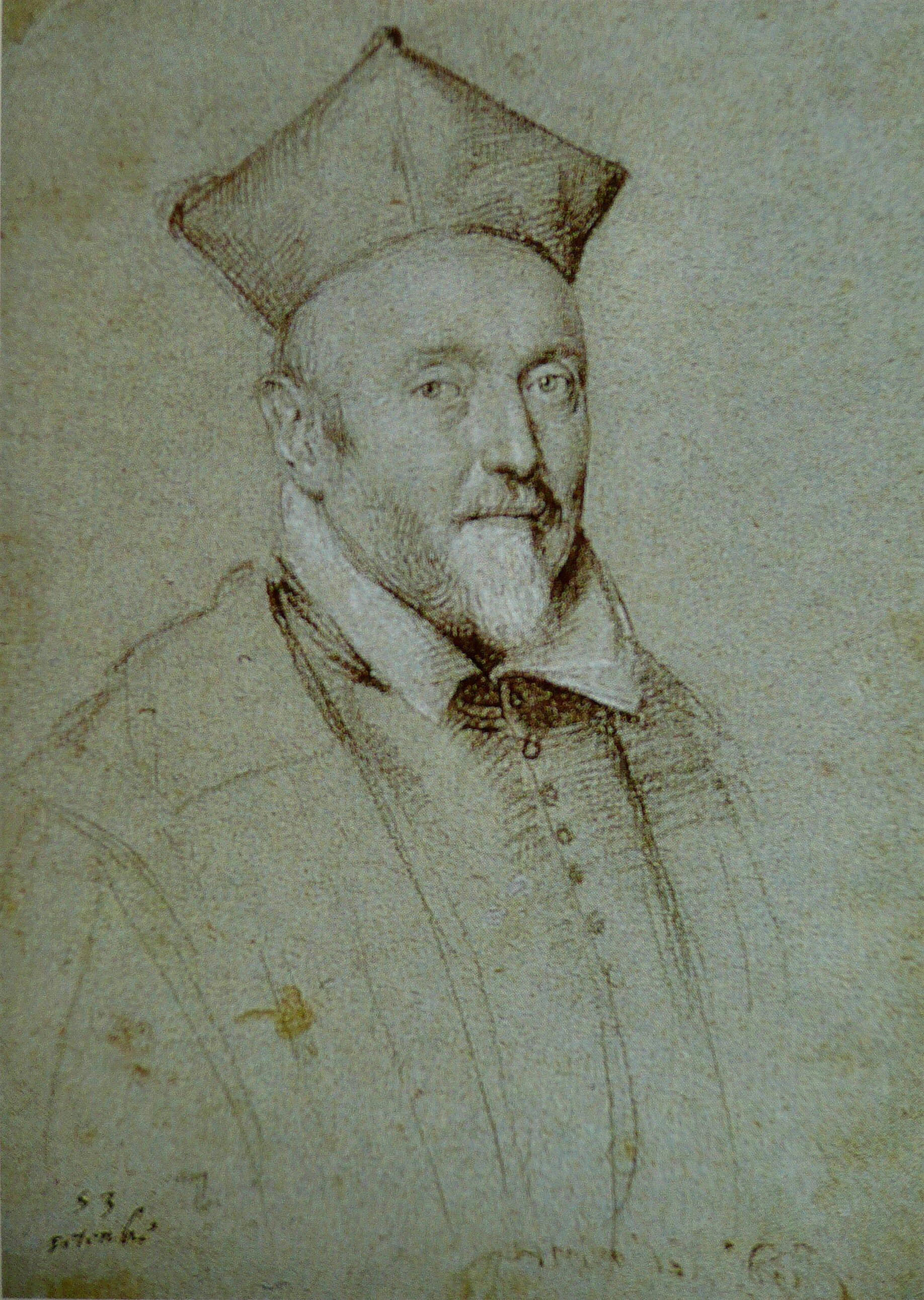
- Sketched portrait of Cardinal del Monte, by Ottavio Leoni, 1616
- Church: Catholic Church
- Appointed: 14 March 1623
- Term ended: 27 August 1627
- Predecessor: Antonmaria Sauli
- Successor: Ottavio Bandini
- Other posts: Cardinal-Bishop of Ostia-Velletri (1623-1627)
- Previous posts: See list: Cardinal-Deacon of Santa Maria in Domnica (1589–1591); Cardinal-Priest of Santa Maria in Ara Coeli (1591-1611); Cardinal-Priest of Santa Maria in Trastevere (1611-1612); Cardinal-Priest of San Lorenzo in Lucina (1612-1615); Cardinal-Bishop of Palestrina (1615-1621); Cardinal-Bishop of Porto–Santa Rufina (1621-1623)

Orders
- Ordination: 12 April 1587
- Consecration: 13 May 1605 by Ludovico de Torres
- Created cardinal: 14 December 1588 by Pope Sixtus V
- Rank: Cardinal-Bishop

Personal details
- Born: Francesco Maria Bourbon del Monte Santa Maria; 5 July 1549 Venice, Republic of Venice
- Died: 27 August 1627 (aged 78) Palazzo Madama, Rome
- Buried: Sant'Urbano alla Caffarella
- Coat of arms: Francesco Maria del Monte's coat of arms

Francesco Maria del Monte, full name Francesco Maria Bourbon del Monte Santa Maria, (5 July 1549 – 27 August 1627) was an Italian cardinal, diplomat, and connoisseur of the arts. His fame today rests on his early patronage of the important Baroque master Caravaggio, and on his art collection (the del Monte collection) which provides provenance for many important works of the period.

== Career ==
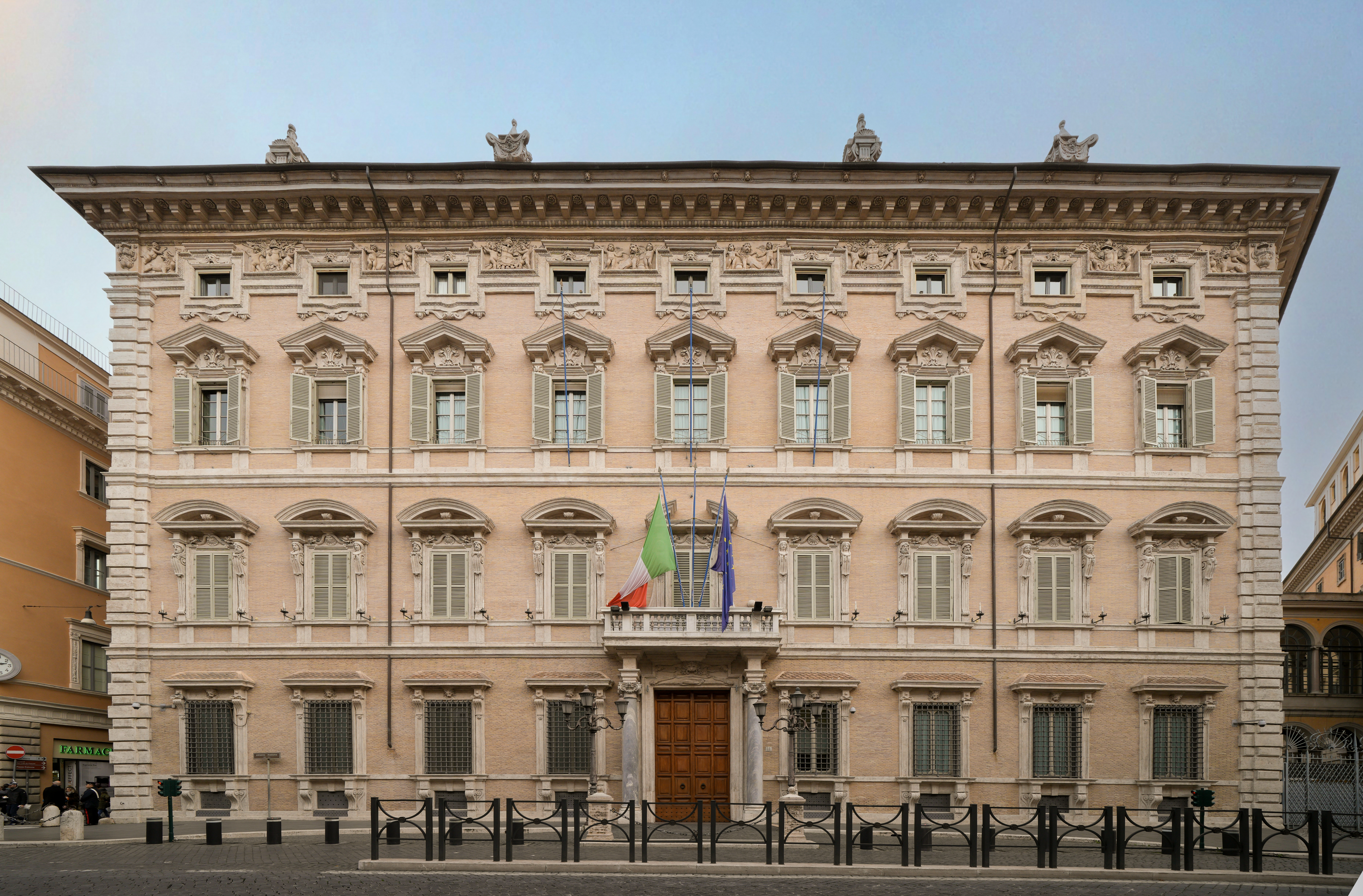
Palazzo Madama, Cardinal del Monte's palace in Rome.

Born in Venice of the aristocratic del Monte family of Tuscan origin (which provided several cardinals to the church), he was the son of Marquis Ranieri Bourbon del Monte, first Count of Monte Baroccio, and Minerva Pianosa. He began his ecclesiastical career as Abbot commendatario of Santa Croce a Monte Fabali. He then went to Rome when he was still quite young, and was appointed as auditor for Cardinal Alessandro Sforza, before being finally admitted into the court of Cardinal Ferdinando de' Medici. He made his way up through the clerical ranks as Referendary of the Tribunals of the Apostolic Signature of Justice and of Grace (1580), and later went to serve the grand-duke of Tuscany, the former Cardinal Ferdinando de' Medici.

He was created cardinal deacon in the consistory of 14 December 1588 under Pope Sixtus V, and received the deaconry of S. Maria in Domnica the following year. He took part in the two conclaves of 1590 (Papal Conclave of September 1590 and the Papal Conclave of Autumn 1590), the conclave of 1591 and the conclave of 1592. He subsequently took the titles of Santa Maria in Aracoeli, Santa Maria in Trastevere, and S. Lorenzo in Lucina. As a cardinal he proved an accomplished diplomat and administrator: he represented the interests of the Grand Duke of Tuscany, the former Cardinal Ferdinando de' Medici, in Rome, and was firmly but discreetly pro-French in the ongoing struggle between the French and Spanish for influence over the papacy.

He served as Prefect of the Tridentine Council (1606 to 1616) and as Bishop of Palestrina from 1615 to 1621. He participated in the Papal Conclave of 1621 and had ambitions of being elected Pope but his pro-French sympathies ensured his veto by the Spanish.

Academics such as Posner, Frommel, and Hibbard have drawn upon extant documents (principally the correspondence of Dirk van Ameyden) that suggest the possibility that he was homosexual and this may have influenced his tastes in the art he commissioned (including those by Caravaggio), as well as damaging prospects of assuming the papacy. Van Ameyden mischievously painted a portrait in words of a man that seemed to display more than a paternal care for the boys in his charge. But Graham-Dixon argues that such accusations seem deliberately to have been cast by the pro-Spanish Ameyden against the pro-French Del Monte in order to discredit him, and bear little real scrutiny. Besides which, there is better evidence that Del Monte had courted women in his youth. In short, the most honest and impartial scholarly conclusion about Del Monte's sexuality is that just as we currently do not have grounds to prove his homosexuality, we likewise do not have grounds to absolutely exclude that possibility.

== Death ==
He died in his Rome palace, the (Palazzo Madama, today the home of the Italian Senate) and was buried in the church of Sant'Urbano, Rome.

== Patron of science and art ==
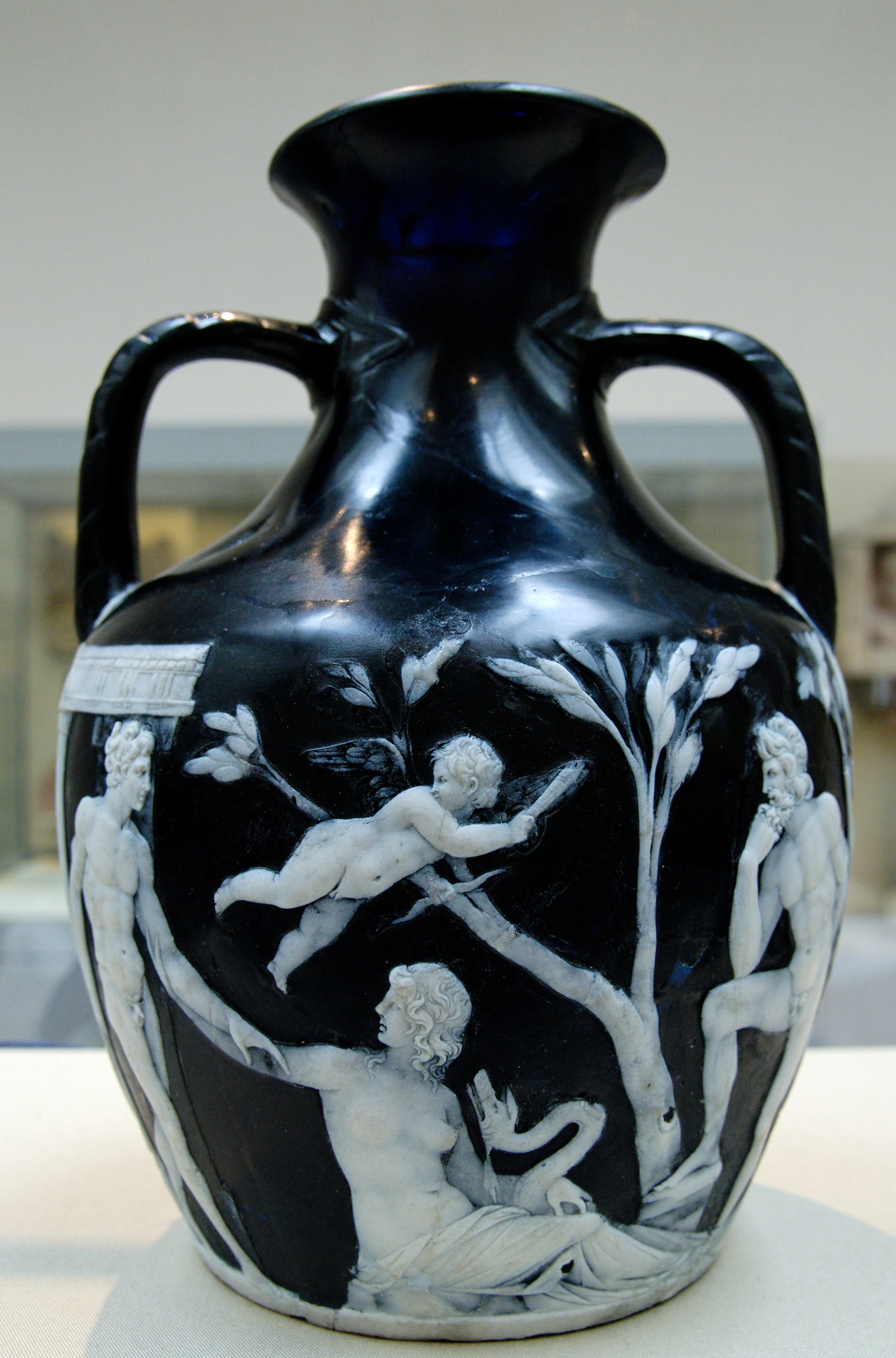
The Portland Vase.

The epitaph on Del Monte's tomb describes him as an "excellent patron of the good arts". Del Monte was a perceptive supporter of the arts and sciences – he was the first recorded owner of the Portland Vase, and his Palazzo Madama household was one of the most important intellectual salons in Rome. At his death his art collection contained more than six hundred paintings, and his support of the young Caravaggio has given provenance to several of that artist's early works.

Together with his brother, he helped Galileo win a lectureship in mathematics in Pisa in 1589 and in Padua in 1592. In the wake of Galileo's discovery of the 'Medicean Planets', he gave the Cardinal a copy of his Sidereus Nuncius (Sidereal message) and a telescope as gifts (in 1610). When Galileo went to Rome in 1611, Grand Duke Cosimo II recommended him to the Cardinal's council so that he could be helped during his sojourn at the Vatican.

Del Monte was a patron of German painter Adam Elsheimer and Andrea Sacchi.

== Selected art from his collection ==
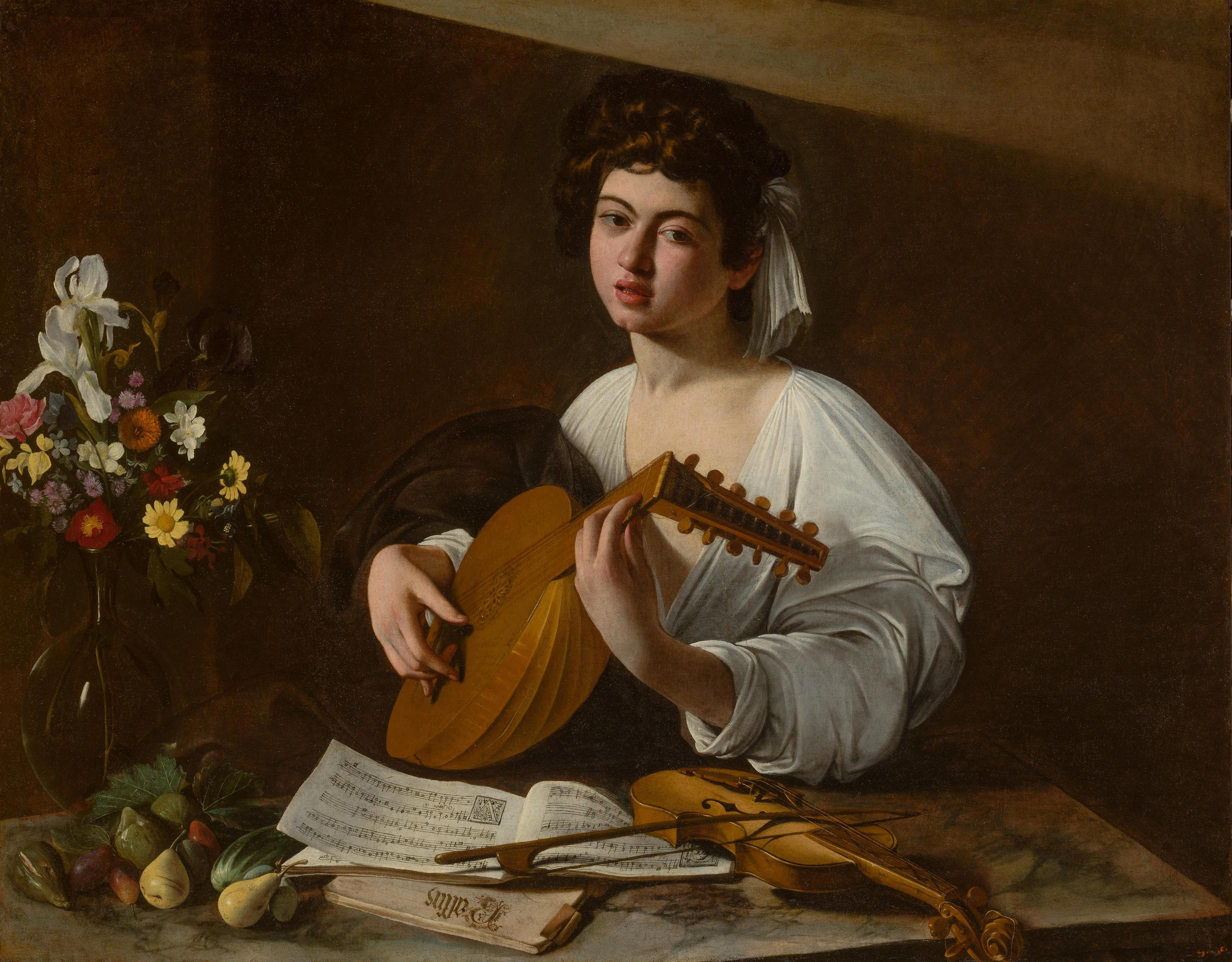
Caravaggio, The Lute Player, oil on canvas, 94 × 119 cm, Hermitage Museum, Saint Petersburg

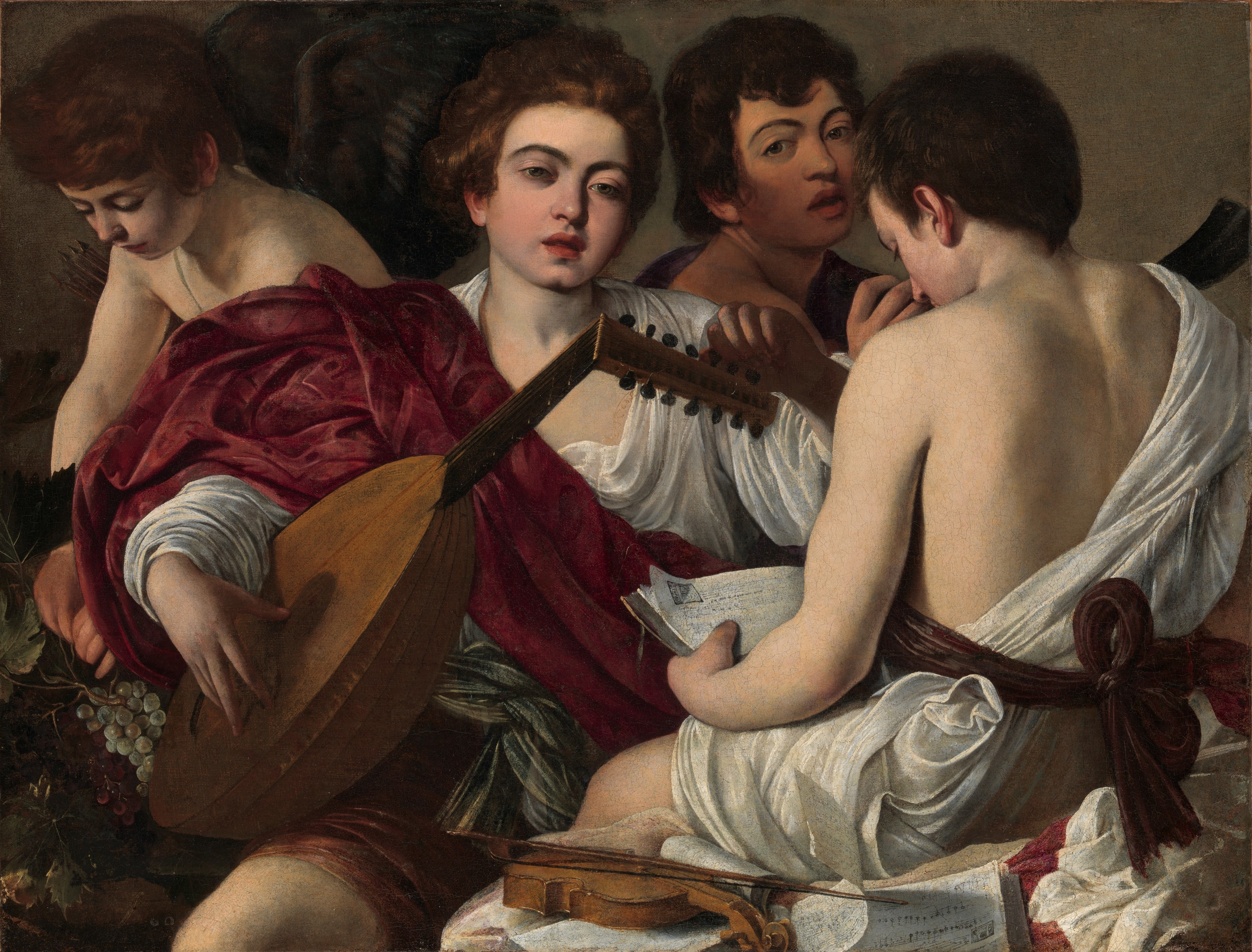
Caravaggio, The Musicians, oil on canvas, 92 × 118.5 cm, The Metropolitan Museum of Art

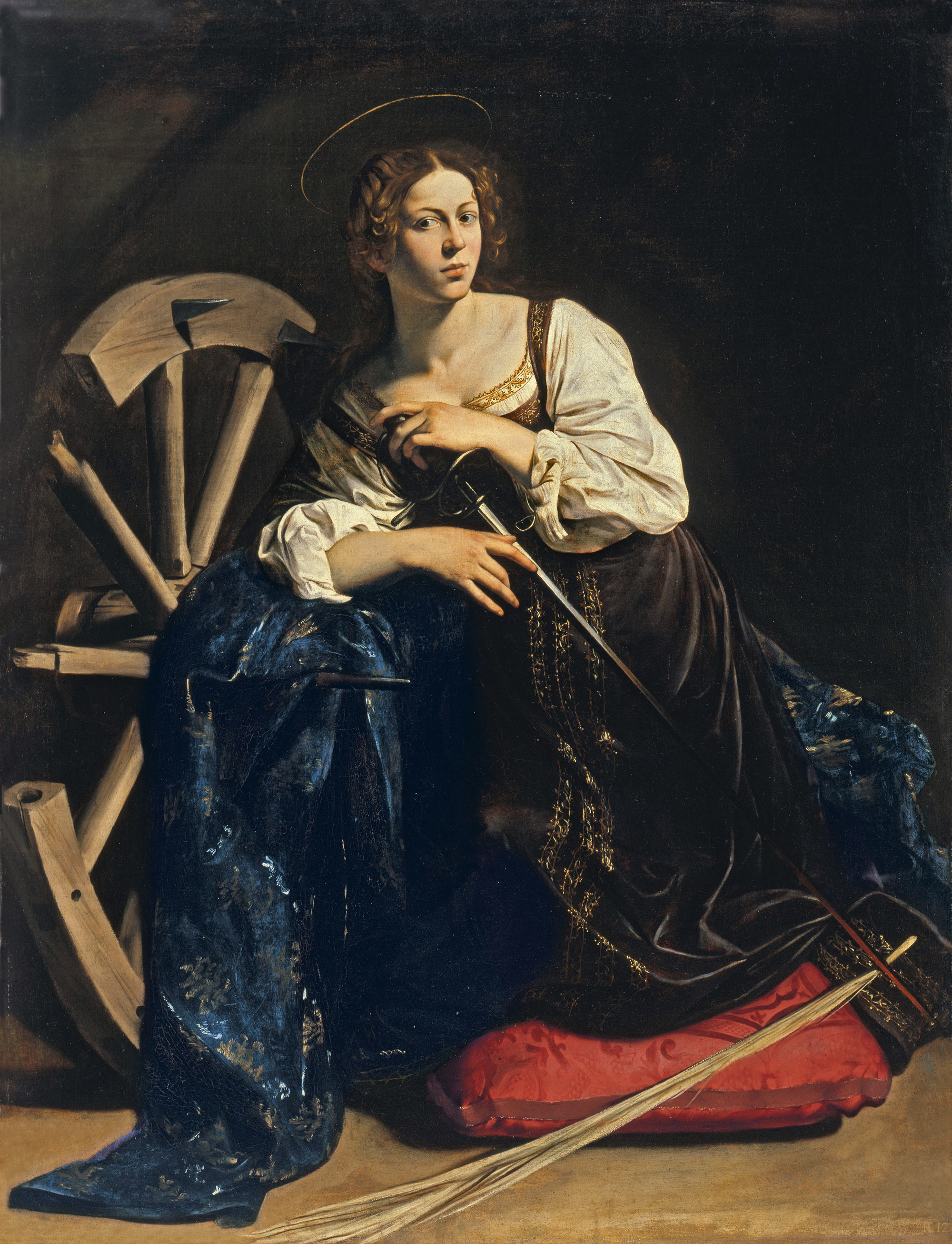
Caravaggio, Saint Catherine of Alexandria, oil on canvas, 173 x 133 cm, Museo Thyssen-Bornemisza, Madrid

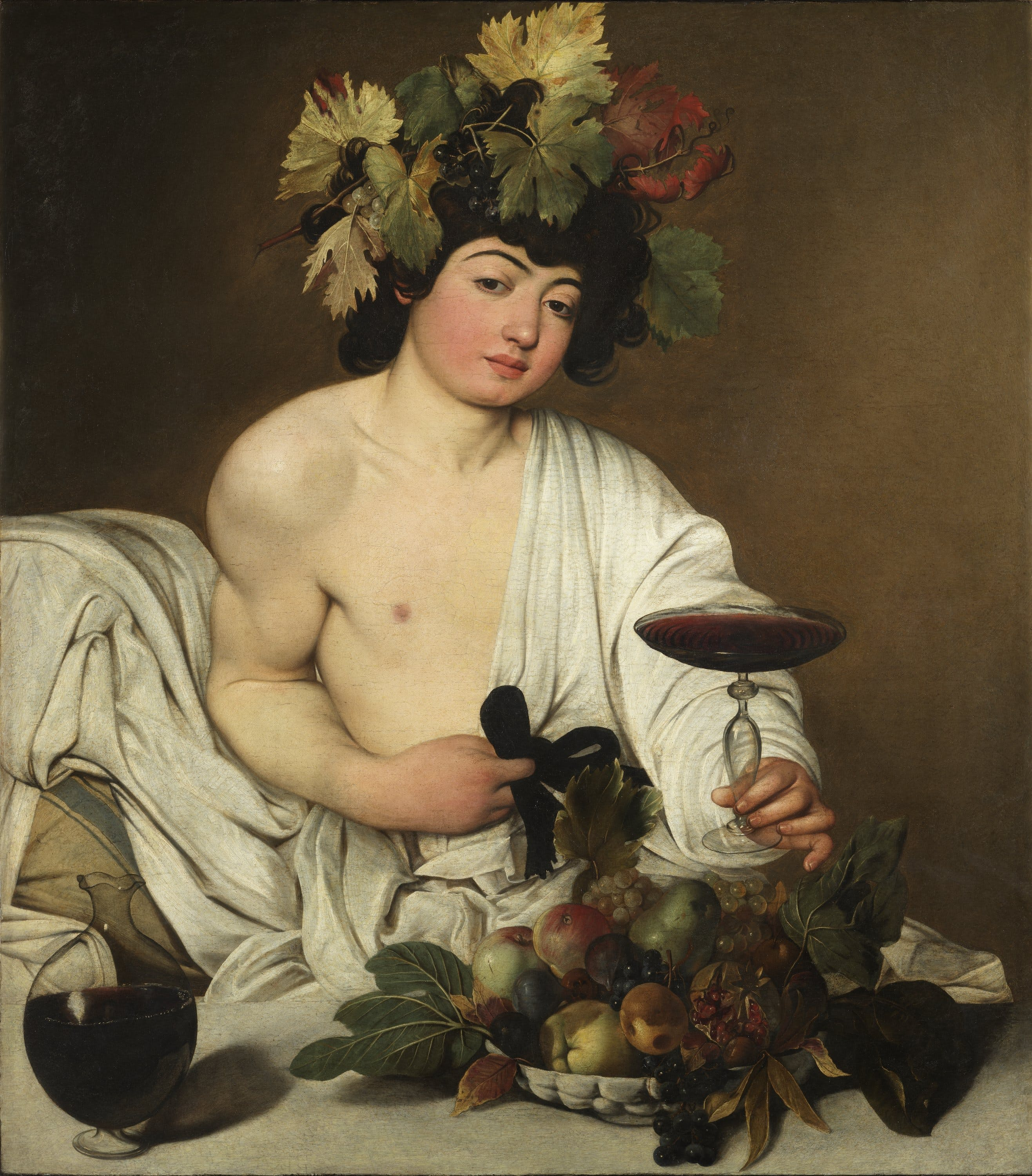
Caravaggio, Bacchus, oil on canvas, 85 × 95 cm, Uffizi Gallery, Florence

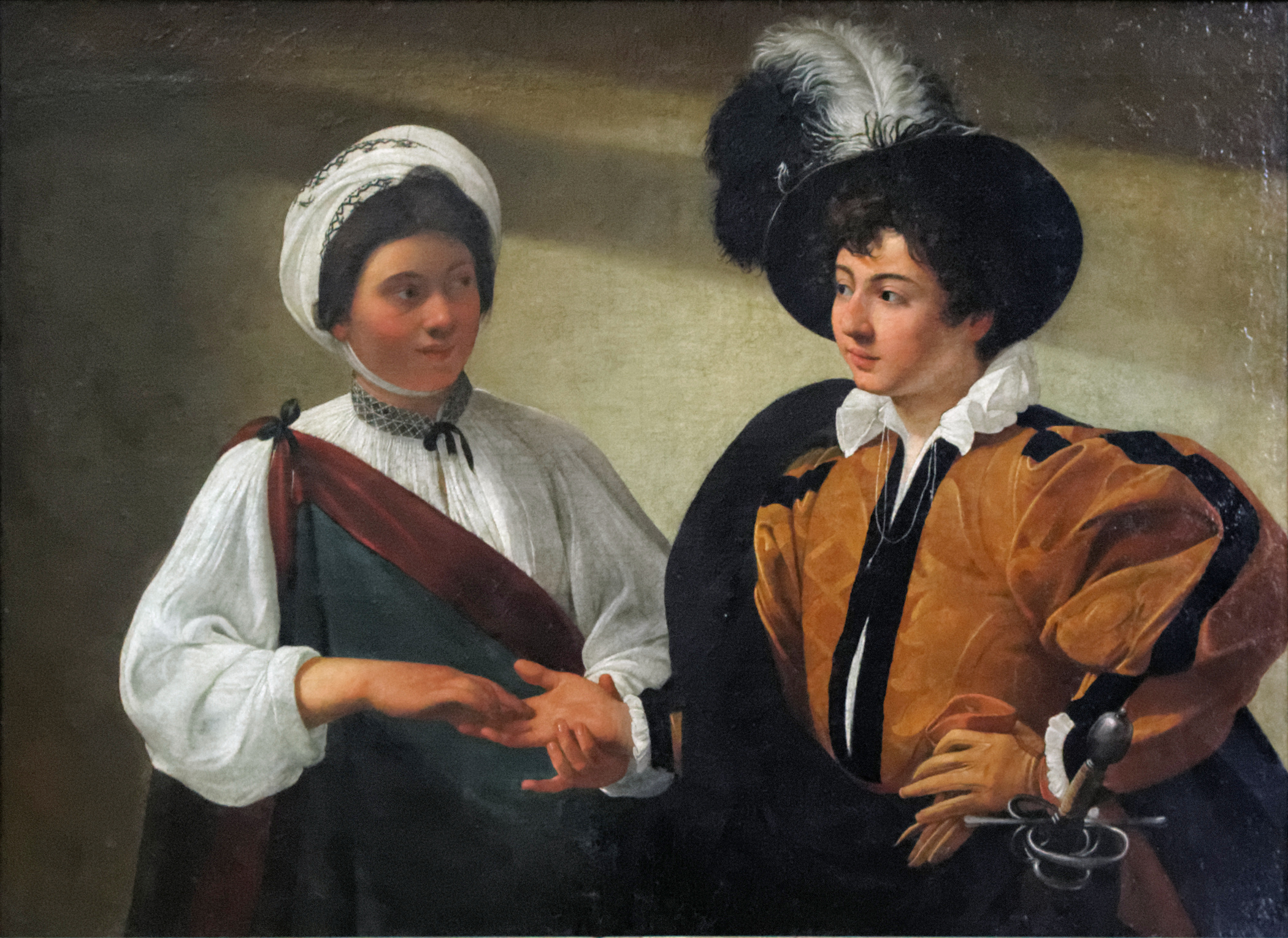
Caravaggio, The Fortune Teller, oil on canvas, 93 × 131 cm, Louvre, Paris

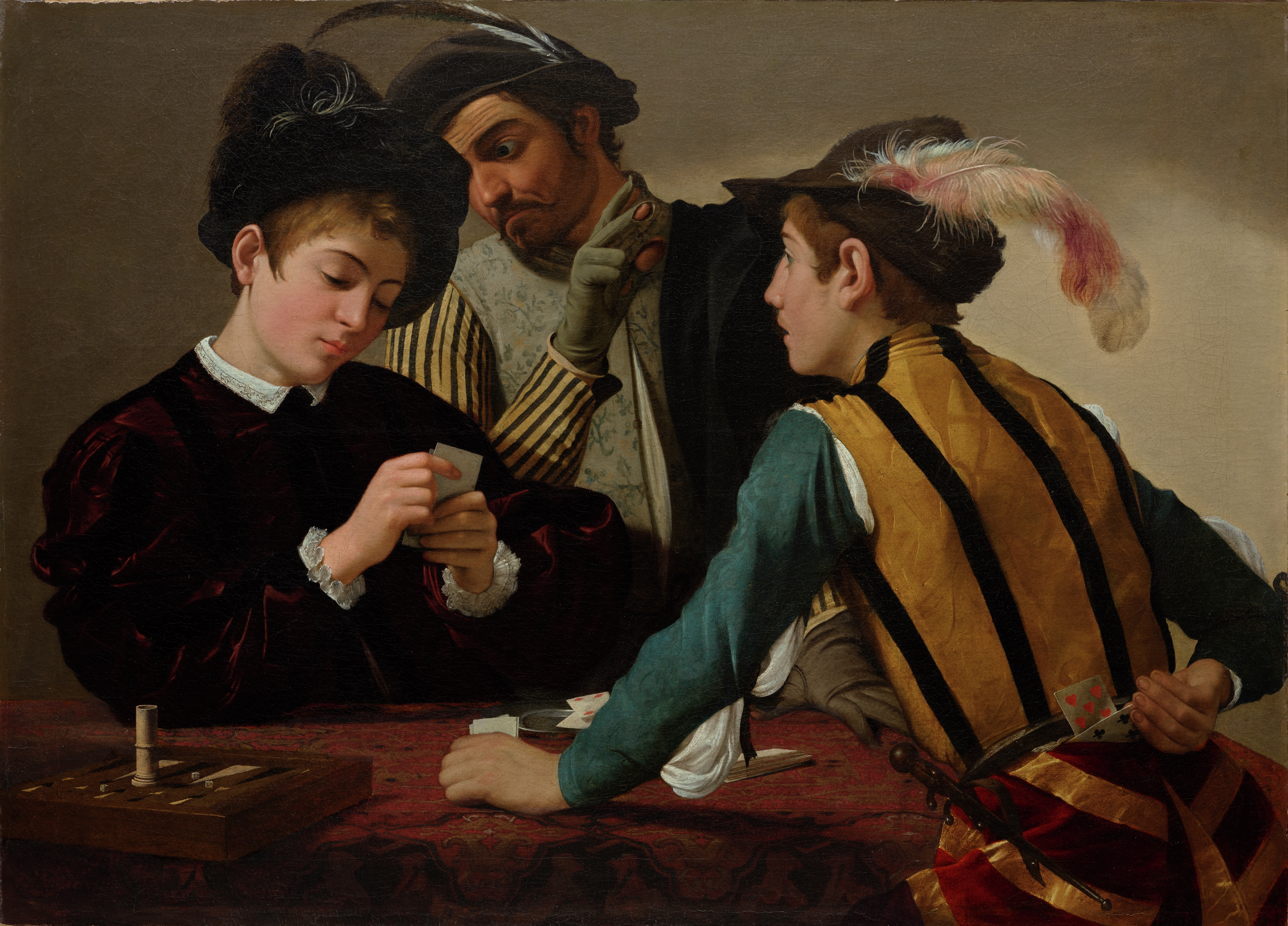
Caravaggio, The Cardsharps, oil on canvas, 94 × 131 cm, Kimbell Art Museum, Fort Worth
