= Antonio Maria Gallo =

Italian Catholic Cardinal and Bishop

His Eminence Antonio Maria Gallo
- Bishop of Osimo
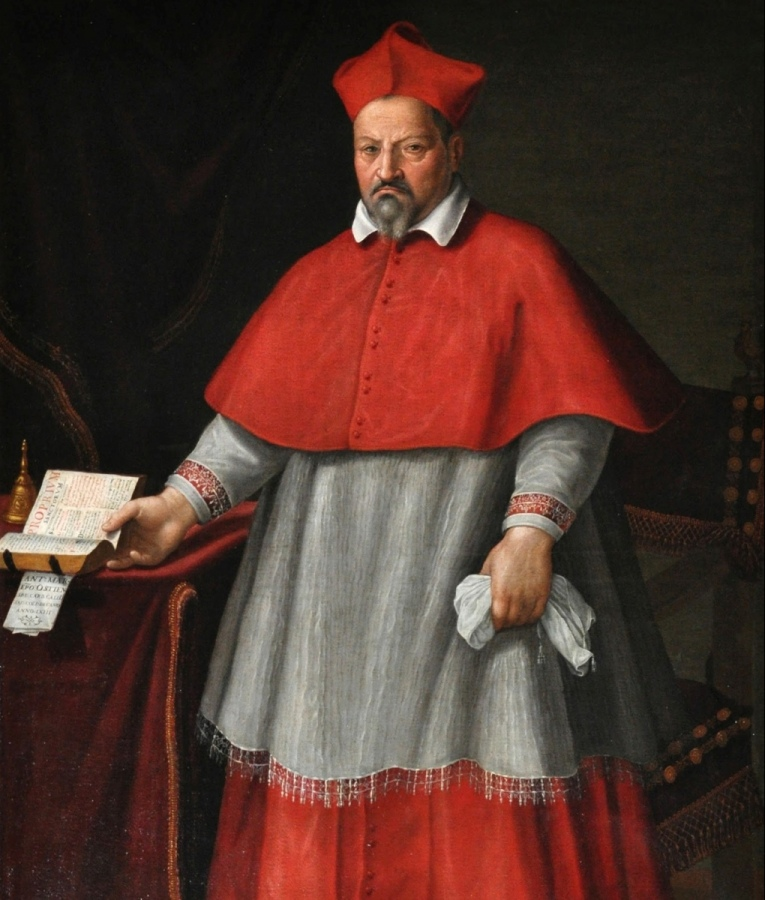
- Church: Catholic Church
- Diocese: Osimo
- Appointed: 19 Jul 1591
- Term ended: 30 Mar 1620
- Predecessor: Teodosio Fiorenzi
- Successor: Agostino Galamini
- Other posts: Dean of the College of Cardinals (1615-1620)
- Previous posts: Bishop of Perugia (1586–1591); Cardinal-Priest of Santa Prassede (1600-1605); Cardinal-Bishop of Frascati (1605-1608); Cardinal-Bishop of Palestrina (1608-1611); Cardinal-Bishop of Porto–Santa Rufina (1611-1615)

Orders
- Created cardinal: 16 November 1586 by Pope Sixtus V
- Rank: Cardinal-Bishop

Personal details
- Born: 18 October 1553 Osimo, Italy
- Died: 30 March 1620 (aged 66) Rome, Papal States
- Buried: Santa Maria in Ara Coeli
- Coat of arms: Antonio Maria Gallo's coat of arms

Antonio Maria Gallo, also known as Antonio Maria Galli (Osimo, 18 October 1553 – Rome, 30 March 1620), was an Italian Catholic Cardinal and Bishop. He was Dean of the College of Cardinals between 1615 and 1620.

== Biography ==
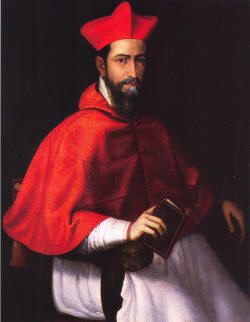
Painting of Antonio Maria Galli, by Giovan Battista Cavagna.

He was born in Osimo in 1553 to Piero Stefano, from the noble Gallo family from the Marche region.

From a young age he became close to Cardinal Peretti, the future Pope Sixtus V, who very quickly assured him an important career. At the age of 21, Peretti took him to Rome and he remained in the service of the new Pope for a long time, first as a Cup-bearer and then as a Papal secretary.

Ordained priest, he was appointed Bishop of Perugia on 5 November 1586 and, just six days later, in the consistory of 17 November, he was appointed Cardinal. In January 1587 he was assigned the title of Cardinal priest of Sant'Agnese in Agone. On 22 August of the same year, the Pope appointed him protector of the Sanctuary of Loreto, entrusting him with the task of establishing the Magistracy in the city.

On 15 January 1590, he was appointed Papal legate in Romagna, a position he held until the end of the year. In 1591, he was transferred to the Archdiocese of Ancona–Osimo, which he held until his death. Very energetic, he fully applied the provisions of the Council of Trent, provisions that his predecessors had only very poorly succeeded in having applied.

In 1600 he opted for the title of Cardinal priest of Santa Prassede and five years later he became Cardinal-bishop of Frascati, in 1608 he received the Suburbicarian see of Palestrina and in 1611 that of Porto and Santa Rufina. Already sub-dean of the Sacred College, he became Dean of the College of Cardinals in 1615 and opted for the Suburbicarian sees of Ostia and Velletri. In the same period he was also Governor of Velletri.

He later toned down his activity in the dioceses, which he now governed through his vicars. He died in Rome on 30 March 1620. The funeral took place in the Church of the Gesù and his body was buried in the Basilica of Santa Maria in Ara Coeli.

=== Conclaves ===
Cardinal Antonio Maria Galli participated in the following conclaves:

- Conclave of September 1590, which elected Pope Urban VII
- Conclave of October–December 1590, which elected Pope Gregory XIV
- Conclave of 1591, which elected Pope Innocent IX
- Conclave of 1592, which elected Pope Clement VIII
- Conclave of March 1605, which elected Pope Leo XI
- Conclave of May 1605, which elected Pope Paul V

== Sources ==
- Silvano Giordano, GALLO, Antonio Maria, in Dizionario biografico degli italiani, vol. 51, Istituto dell'Enciclopedia Italiana, 1998.
- David M. Cheney, Antonio Maria Gallo, in Catholic Hierarchy.
- Salvador Miranda, GALLO, Antonio Maria, on fiu.edu – The Cardinals of the Holy Roman Church, Florida International University.

Catholic Church titles
| Preceded by François de Joyeuse | Dean of the College of Cardinals; 1615 – 1620 | Succeeded by Antonmaria Sauli |
