= Juan Hurtado de Mendoza (cardinal) =

Spanish cardinal

Juan Hurtado de Mendoza, nicknamed "The Handsome Spaniard" (El Bello Español) (Guadalajara, Spain, 1548 – Rome, 6 January 1592), was a Spanish Catholic cleric and cardinal.

== Biography ==
He was the 4th son of Diego Hurtado de Mendoza y Aragón (1519–1563), who predeceased his father Íñigo López de Mendoza, 4th Duke of the Infantado. His elder brother was Íñigo López de Mendoza y Mendoza, 5th Duke of the Infantado (1536–1601).

He studied Philosophy and Theology at the University of Alcalá. He was appointed a canon of the chapter of Salamanca Cathedral, archdeacon of the metropolitan Cathedral of Toledo, and deacon of the church of Talavera de la Reina.

At the proposal of King Philip II of Spain, he was created a cardinal in the consistory of 18 December 1587, and received the cardinal's hat and the titular church of Santa Maria in Traspontina on 6 March 1589, becoming the fifth cardinal from the Mendoza family. Nevertheless, he first resisted resigning from his position as deacon of Talavera when the Pope requested that he do so.

Immediately following his appointment, he traveled to Rome, where he established a household with an extraordinary number of servants, even though his own private life was marked by modesty and simplicity.

He participated in the conclaves of September 1590, October–December 1590 and 1591, and served as protector of Spain before the Holy See. He died in Rome on 6 January 1592.
