= 1590 papal conclave =

1590 papal conclave may refer to:

- September 1590 papal conclave, which elected Urban VII to succeed Sixtus V
- October–December 1590 papal conclave, which elected Gregory XIV to succeed Urban VII
