= Marco Antonio Colonna =

Roman Catholic cardinal

Marco Antonio Colonna (1523–1597) was an Italian Roman Catholic bishop and cardinal.

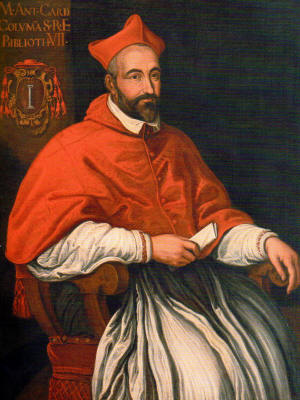
Portrait of Cardinal Marco Antonio Colonna

== Biography ==
A member of the Colonna family, Marco Antonio Colonna was born in Rome in 1523, the son of Roman nobles Camillo Colonna and Vittoria Colonna. He was the grand-nephew of Cardinal Pompeo Colonna. He studied philosophy and Christian theology under Felice Peretti, who became Pope Sixtus V in 1585.

On 9 July 1560 he was elected to be Archbishop of Taranto. He was active in the Council of Trent in 1562-63.

Pope Pius IV made him a cardinal priest in the consistory of 12 March 1565. He received the red hat and the titular church of Santi Apostoli on 15 May 1565.

He participated in the papal conclave of 1565-66 that elected Pope Pius V. On 13 October 1568 he was transferred to the metropolitan see of Salerno. In 1572 he participated in the papal conclave that elected Pope Gregory XIII. He resigned the government of the Archdiocese of Salerno sometime before 25 June 1574.

During the Jubilee of 1575, he opened the holy door of the Archbasilica of St. John Lateran. He was the Camerlengo of the Sacred College of Cardinals from 8 January 1579 to 8 January 1580. On 5 December 1580 he opted for the titular church of San Pietro in Vincoli. He was named papal legate in Marche on 25 October 1581.

He participated in the papal conclave of 1585 that elected Pope Sixtus V. On 13 October 1586 he opted for the titular church of San Lorenzo in Lucina upon became cardinal protopriest. Under Pope Sixtus V, he was a prefect of the Sacred Congregation of the Index. On 11 May 1587 he opted for the order of cardinal bishops, taking the suburbicarian see of Palestrina. He was named papal legate to the Campagne and Maritime Province on 13 May 1587.

He was a participant in the 1st papal conclave of 1590 that elected Pope Urban VII; the 2nd papal conclave of 1590 that elected Pope Gregory XIV; the papal conclave of 1591 that elected Pope Innocent IX; and the papal conclave of 1592 that elected Pope Clement VIII. He was the Librarian of the Vatican Library from 1591 to 1597.

He died in Zagarolo on 13 March 1597. He was buried in the Franciscan church there.

While bishop, he was the principal consecrator of Lelio Giordano, Bishop of Acerno (1570) and César Alamagna Cardona, Bishop of Cava (1572); and the principal co-consecrator of Gabriele Paleotti, Bishop of Bologna (1566).
