= October–December 1590 conclave =

Election of Catholic Pope Gregory XIV

Papal conclave October–December 1590

Dates and location
- 8 October – 5 December 1590; Apostolic Palace, Papal States

Key officials
- Dean: Giovanni Antonio Serbelloni
- Sub-dean: Alfonso Gesualdo
- Camerlengo: Enrico Caetani
- Protopriest: Mark Sittich von Hohenems
- Protodeacon: Andreas von Österreich

Election
- Vetoed: Ippolito Aldobrandini; Vincenzo Lauro, ...

Elected pope
- Niccolò Sfondrati; Name taken: Gregory XIV
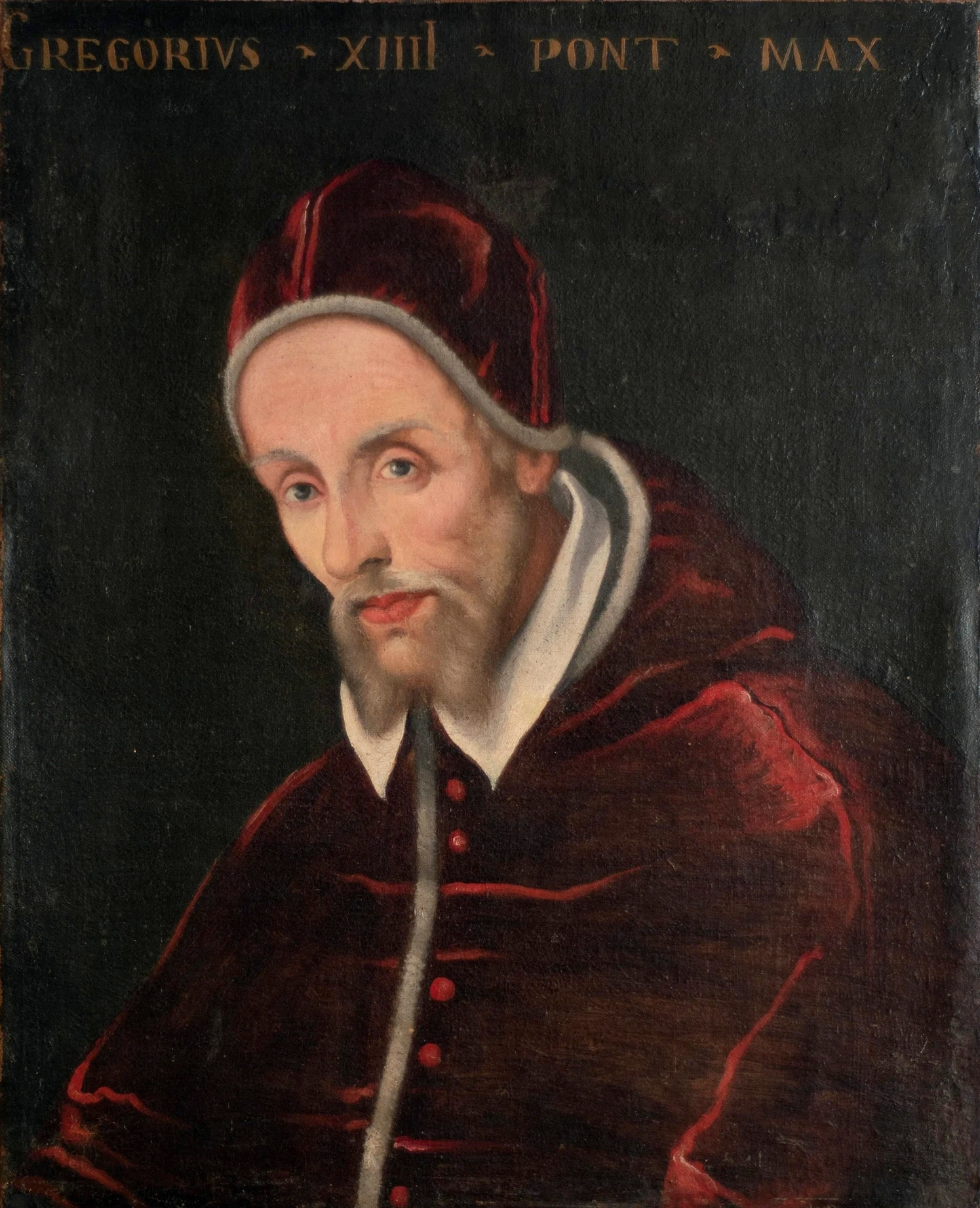

A conclave held from 8 October to 5 December 1590 ended with the election of Gregory XIV was elected as the new pope. This conclave was marked by significant interference from King Philip II of Spain.

== The pontificate of Urban VII ==
Urban VII was elected as pope on 15 September 1590. On 27 September 1590, he died due to malaria infection after only 12 days of his pontificate before he could be crowned, giving him the shortest papacy in history. His death was deeply mourned by the poor from Rome who inherited his wealth.

== Participants ==
The conclave, after the death of Urban VII, was attended by all the cardinals who took part in his election, with the exception of Cardinal Federico Cornaro (who had died on 4 October). Protodeacon Andreas von Österreich and Camerlengo Enrico Caetani also came to Rome. Of the 65 total cardinals, 54 took part in conclave.:

- Giovanni Antonio Serbelloni (nominated on 31 January 1560) –Cardinal- Bishop of Ostia and Velletri; Dean of the Sacred College of the Cardinals; prefect of the Congregation of Ceremonies
- Alfonso Gesualdo (26 February 1561) –Cardinal- Bishop of Porto and S. Rufina; Subdean of the Sacred College of Cardinals, prefect of the Sacred Congregation of Rites
- Innico d'Avalos d'Aragona, O.S.Iacobis. (26 February 1561) –Cardinal- Bishop of Frascati
- Marco Antonio Colonna, (12 March 1565) – Cardinal- Bishop of Palestrina; legate of Campagna and Marittima; archpriest of St. John Lateran's Basilica
- Tolomeo Gallio (12 March 1565) – Cardinal-Bishop of Sabina
- Gabriele Paleotti (12 March 1565) – Cardinal- Bishop Albano; archbishop of Bologna
- Markus Sitticus von Hohenems (26 February 1561) – Cardinal- Priest of S. Maria in Trastevere; Protopriest of the Sacred College of Cardinals
- Michele Bonelli, O.P. (6 March 1566) – Cardinal- Priest of S. Lorenzo in Lucina; Vicar General for the Vatican City State; vice rector of Sabaudia; Grand prior in Rome of the Sovereign Order of Malta
- Ludovico Madruzzo (26 February 1561) – Cardinal- Priest of S. Anastasia; Bishop of Trento; Cardinal- protector of Germany
- Giulio Antonio Santori (17 May 1570) – Cardinal- Priest of S. Bartolomeo all’Isola; Grand Inquisitor of the Supreme Sacred Congregation for the Roman and Universal Inquisition and the French Congregation; Archbishop of S. Severina
- Girolamo Rusticucci (17 May 1570) – Cardinal- Priest of S. Susanna; vicar general of the diocese of Rome; Camerlengo of the Sacred College of Cardinals
- Nicolas de Pellevé (17 May 1570) – Cardinal- Priest of S. Prassede; prefect of the Sacred Consistorial Congregation; Archbishop of Sens
- Gian Girolamo Albani (17 May 1570) – Cardinal- Priest of S. Giovanni a Porta Latina; governor of the Bagnoreggio
- Girolamo Simoncelli (22 December 1553) – Cardinal- Priest of S. Prisca; administrator of Orvieto
- Pedro de Deza (21 February 1578) – Cardinal- Priest of S. Girolamo degli Schiavoni
- Antonio Carafa (24 March 1568) – Cardinal- Priest of S. Giovanni e Paolo; Prefect of the Tribunal of the Apostolic Signature; Prefect of the S.C. of the Tridentine Council; Librarian of the Holy Roman Church
- Giovan Antonio Facchinetti (12 December 1583) – Cardinal- Priest of SS. IV Coronati
- Alessandro Ottaviano de' Medici (12 December 1583) – Cardinal- Priest of S. Ciriaco alla Terme; Archbishop of Florence
- Giulio Canani (12 December 1583) – Cardinal- Priest of S Eusebio; Bishop of Adria
- Niccolò Sfondrati (12 December 1583) – Cardinal- Priest of S. Cecilia; Bishop of Cremona
- Antonmaria Salviati (12 December 1583) – Cardinal- Priest of S. Maria della Pace
- Agostino Valier (12 December 1583) – Cardinal- Priest of S. Marco; Bishop of Verona
- Vincenzo Lauro (12 December 1583) – Cardinal- Priest of S. Clemente; Bishop of Mondovi
- Filippo Spinola (12 December 1583) – Cardinal- Priest of S. Sabina; Prefect of the Congregation for Propagation of the Faith; legate in Umbria, Perugia and Spoleto
- Simeone Tagliavia d'Aragona (12 December 1583) – Cardinal- Priest of S. Maria degli Angeli
- Scipione Lancelotti (12 December 1583) – Cardinal- Priest of S. Salvatore in Lauro; The secretary for Latin letters
- Giovanni Vincenzo Gonzaga, O.S.Io.Hieros. (21 February 1578) – Cardinal- Priest of S. Alessio
- Enrico Caetani (18 December 1585) – Cardinal- Priest of S. Pudenziana; Camerlengo of the Holy Roman Church; Latin Patriarch of Alexandria
- Giovanni Battista Castrucci (18 December 1585) – Cardinal- Priest of S. Maria in Aracoeli; Archbishop of Chieti; Prefect of the Supreme Tribunal of the Apostolic Signatura
- Domenico Pinelli (18 December 1585) – Cardinal- Priest of S. Lorenzo in Panisperna; Archpriest of St. John Lateran's Basilica; legate of papal galleys
- Ippolito Aldobrandini (18 December 1585) – Cardinal- Priest of The Papal Basilica of St Pancrazio Outside the Walls; Apostolic Penitentiary
- Girolamo della Rovere (16 November 1586) – Cardinal- Priest of S. Pietro in Vincoli; Archbishop of Turin
- Girolamo Bernerio, O.P. (16 November 1586) – Cardinal- Priest of S. Maria sopra Minerva; Bishop of Ascoli-Piceno
- Antonio Maria Gallio (16 November 1586) – Cardinal- Priest of S. Agnese in Agone; Bishop of Perugia; legate in Romania
- Costanzo Buttafoco da Sarnano, O.F.M.Conv. (16 November 1586) – Cardinal- Priest of S. Pietro in Montorio
- Ippolito de Rossi (18 December 1585) – Cardinal- Priest of S. Biagio dell’Anello; Bishop of Pavia
- William Allen (7 August 1587) – Cardinal- Priest of S. Silvestro a Martino ai Monti
- Scipione Gonzaga (18 December 1587) – Cardinal- Priest of S. Maria del Popolo; Latin Patriarch of Jerusalem
- Antonio Maria Sauli (18 December 1587) – Cardinal- Priest of SS. Vitale, Gervasio e Protasio; Archbishop of Genoa
- Giovanni Evangelista Pallotta (18 December 1587) – Cardinal- Priest of S. Mateo in Merulana; Archbishop of Cosenza; the Archpriest of the Vatican Basilica and prefect of Fabric of Saint Peter
- Juan Hurtado de Mendoza (18 December 1587) – Cardinal- Priest of S. Maria Transpontina; cardinal protector of Spain
- Giovan Francesco Morosini (15 July 1588) – Cardinal- Priest of S. Maria in Via; Bishop of Brescia
- Mariano Pierbenedetti (20 December 1589) – Cardinal- Priest of SS. Marcellino e Pietro; Bishop of Martorano
- Gregorio Petrocchini, O.E.S.A. (20 December 1589) – Cardinal- Priest of S. Agostino
- Andreas von Austria (19 November 1576) – Cardinal Deacon of S. Maria Nuova; Protodeacon of Sacred College of Cardinals; Bishop of Constance; Bishop-Coadjutor of Brixen; cardinal protector of Austria
- Francesco Sforza di Santa Fiora (12 December 1583) – Cardinal Deacon of S. Maria in Via Lata
- Alessandro Peretti di Montalto (13 May 1585) – Cardinal Deacon of S. Lorenzo in Damaso; Vice-Chancellors of the Holy Roman Church; legate in Bologna; cardinal protector of Poland
- Girolamo Mattei (16 November 1586) – Cardinal Deacon of S. Eustachio; pro-prefect of the Sacred congregation of the Council of Trent
- Benedetto Giustiniani (16 November 1586) – Cardinal Deacon of S. Maria in Cosmedin
- Ascanio Colonna (16 November 1586) – Cardinal Deacon of S. Nicola in Carcere Tulliano
- Federico Borromeo (18 December 1587) – Cardinal Deacon of S. Agata in Suburra
- Francesco Maria Bourbon del Monte (14 December 1588) – Cardinal Deacon of S. Maria in Domnica
- Agostino Cusani (14 December 1588) – Cardinal Deacon of S. Adriano
- Guido Pepoli (20 December 1589) – Cardinal Deacon of San Cosma e Damiano

Twenty-four electors were nominees of Sixtus V, fifteen of Gregory XIII, six of Pius V, eight of Pius IV, and one of Julius III.

=== Absentees ===
Eleven cardinals were absent:

- Gaspar de Quiroga y Vila (15 December 1578) – Cardinal- Priest of S. Balbina; Archbishop of Toledo and Primate of Spain; Inquisitor General of the Spanish Inquisition
- Albrecht VII Habsburg (3 March 1577) – Cardinal- Priest of S. Croce in Gerusalemme; Inquisitor General of the Portuguese Inquisition; Viceroy of Portugal
- Rodrigo de Castro Osorio (12 December 1583) – Cardinal- Priest of SS. XII Apostoli; Archbishop of Seville
- Charles II de Bourbon-Vendôme (12 December 1583) – Cardinal- Priest Archbishop of Rouen, administrator of Diocese of Bayeux
- François de Joyeuse (12 December 1583) – Cardinal- Priest of SS. Trinita al Monte Pincio; Archbishop of Toulouse; cardinal protector of France
- Jerzy Radziwiłł (12 December 1583) – Cardinal- Priest of S. Sisto; Bishop of Vilnius
- Philippe de Lenoncourt (16 November 1586) – Cardinal- Priest of S. Onofrio; prefect of The Congregation of the Index
- Pierre de Gondi (18 December 1587) – Cardinal- Priest of S. Silvestro in Capite; Bishop of Paris
- Andrew Báthory (4 July 1584) – Cardinal Deacon of S. Angelo in Pescheria; Bishop of Warmia; Bishop-coadjutor of Kraków
- Hugues Loubenx de Verdalle, O.S.Io.Hieros. (18 December 1587) – Cardinal Deacon of Santa Maria in Portico; prefect of papal galleys; Grand prior in Rome of the Sovereign Order of Malta
- Charles de Lorraine (20 December 1589) – Cardinal Deacon; Bishop of Metz

Seven of them were appointed by Gregory XIII and four by Sixtus V.

== Divisions and candidates ==
As during the previous conclave there were three large factions:

- Spanish faction – political supporters of Spain. The core of the party was formed by Cardinals Madruzzo (faction leader), Deza, Mendoza, Tagliavia d'Aragona, Spinola, Marchntonio Colonna, Ascanio Colonna, Gallio, Pellevé, Santori, Rusticucci, Sfondrati, Paleotti, Simoncelli, Facchinetti, Carafa, Allen, Cusani, Giovanni Vincenzo Gonzaga, Scipione Gonzaga, Andreas von Österreich and Caetani;
- Sistine faction – nominees of Sixtus V who were led by his grandnephew Alessandro Peretti de Montalto. The members of this faction were Cardinals Castrucci, Pinelli, Aldobrandini, della Rovere, Bernerio, Galli, Sarnano, Rossi, Sauli, Pallotta, Morosini, Pierbenedetti, Petrocchini, Matei, Giustiniani, Borromeo, del Monte and Pepoli;
- Gregorians – nominees of Gregory XIII: Sforza, Medici, Canani, Salviati, Valeri, Lauro, Lancelotti. Cardinal Sforza, the leader of this faction, was related by marriage to Gregory XIII.

There were two small groups practising nepotism. One was related to Pius IV (Sitticus von Hohenems, Serbelloni, Gesualdo i Avalos d'Aragona) and the other to Pius V (Bonelli, Albani). Due to the small size of the groups, they almost did not play any major role and the majority of nominees of these Popes became part of the Spanish faction.

The Cardinals who were considered as papabile were Serbelloni, Marchntonio Colonna, Gallio, Paleotto, Madruzzo, Santori, Facchinetti, Sfondrati, Valier, Lauro, della Rovere.

In the context of this conclave, the Prophecy of the Popes was forged, probably in order to support Cardinal Girolamo Simoncelli's bid for the papacy.

== Interference from Philip II of Spain ==
On 6 October, even before the conclave had started, the Spanish ambassador Olivares gave the Cardinals the official recommendations of King Philip II. They contained two lists of names. The first one had seven names: Madruzzo, Santori, Facchinetti, Sfondrati, Paleotti, Gallio and Marcantonio Colonna. The king's official will was a choice of one of those seven names. The second list contained the names of 30 cardinals, who Philip II put a clear veto on. The subjects from Madrid were banned from voting against the king's recommendations. Philip II wished to secure his claim to the French throne by gaining power over The Holy See. Although in the past, secular monarchs had many times and in different ways tried to influence the election of popes, such an explicit interference was unprecedented. It was the beginning of what in the seventeenth century was considered as Jus exclusivae.

== Conclave ==
The conclave began on 8 October, with 52 cardinals. A few days later, Camerlengo Caetani joined them after his return from France, and on 13 October Cardinal Andreas von Österreich arrived. Cardinal Mantalto nominated Ippolito Aldobrandini but Cardinal Madruzzo, who was the leader of the Spanish faction, and according to the will of King Philip II, effectively torpedoed this candidacy. The nomination of Cardinal Vincenzo Lauro, which was proposed by Montalo and Sforza, suffered the same fate.

On 12 October, a rumor broke in Rome that Marco Antonio Colonna was elected the new Pope. His nomination did take place but did not receive the majority of votes, due to the opposition of Sforza and his faction. The Spanish did not want to support him either. Although Colonna was one of Philip II's choices, unofficially it was known that both he and Gallio were not popular in Madrid and their election was unlikely.

On 15 October, the Spanish faction took the initiative and nominated its leader Madruzzo. The candidacy met with strong opposition from the Sforza, d'Aragony and the Venetian cardinals. Objections against Madruzzo included his close ties with the king of Spain, his poor state of health (he was impaired by gout), and even his origin (his mother was German).

After the rejection of Madruzzo, Cardinal Montalto offered the Spanish faction five names — Aldobrandini, Lauro, Valiero, Salviati and Medici — and asked them to pick one. As King Philip had rejected all five of them, none of them were chosen.

As a result of the prolonged sede vacante, more and more chaos reigned on the streets. During November, disagreements among the Cardinals increased instead of decreasing. The main opponent of the Spanish faction was Cardinal Montalto.

At the end of November, the majority of cardinals gradually came to the conclusion that no matter how outrageous the interference of Philip II, without the support of his followers there was no chance to elect a Pope, so it would be better to choose someone from his list. On 4 December, therefore, supported by the Madrid faction, Cardinal Paleotti received 33 votes (he needed another three to win). Montalto did not prefer Paleotti, so together with Sforza he came to the conclusion that in order to prevent his election, they needed to support either Sfondrati or Facchinetti. In the end, they decided to elect Sfondrati.

== Election of Gregory XIV ==
On the morning of 5 December 1590, after nearly two months' conclave, 55-year-old Cardinal Niccolo Sfondrati, Bishop of Cremona, was elected Pope, and chose the name Gregory XIV. His coronation took place on 8 December 1590.

== Sources ==
- Von Pastor, Lugwig (1932). "History of the Popes", V. 22. London
- Chacón, Alfonso (1677). "Vitæ, et res gestæ Pontificvm Romanorum et P R. E. Cardinalivm ab initio nascentis Ecclesiæ vsque ad Vrbanvm VIII. Pont. Max," V. IV. Rome (Latin)
- Eubel, Konrad (1922) "Hierarchia Catholica." V. IV. Padwa (Latin)
