= Cardinals created by Innocent IX =

Catholic appointments in 1591

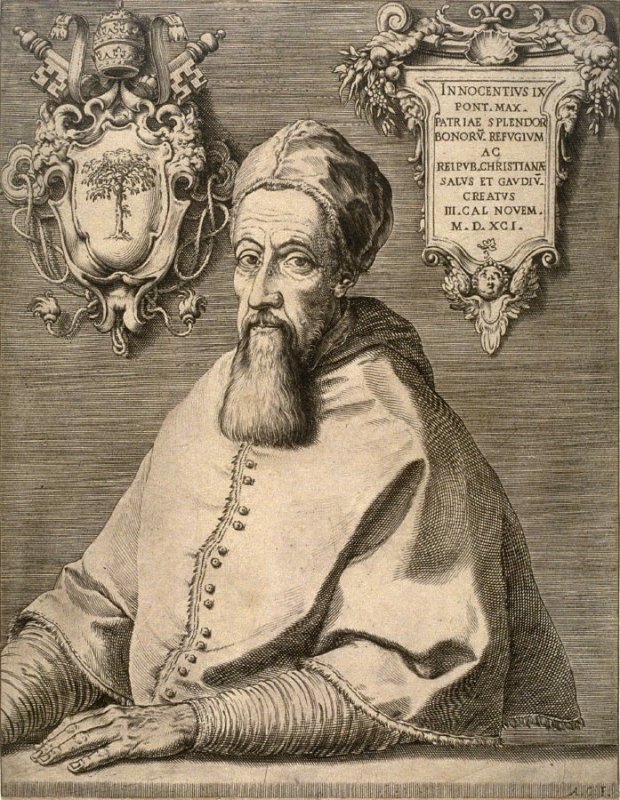
Pope Innocent IX (1519-91).

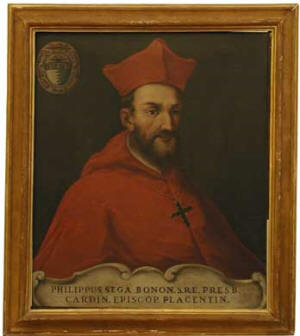
Filippo Sega (1537-96), made a cardinal on December 18, 1591.

Pope Innocent IX (r. 1591) created two cardinals in one consistory on 18 December 1591:

1. Filippo Sega, bishop of Piacenza – cardinal-priest of S. Onofrio (received the title on 5 December 1594), † 29 May 1596

2. Giovanni Antonio Faccinetti de Nuce, grand-nephew of the Pope – cardinal-deacon without the title, then cardinal-priest of SS. IV Coronati (4 March 1592), † 18 May 1606
