= Vincenzo Lauro =

Italian diplomat, bishop, cardinal (1523–1592)

Vincenzo Lauro (1523–1592) was an Italian papal diplomat, bishop of Mondovì, and Cardinal from 1583.

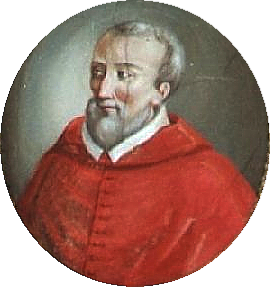
Vincenzo Lauro.

He was born at Tropea. His career was forwarded by Cardinal Pier Paolo Parisio and Cardinal Nicola Gaddi. He became a diplomat while acting for Cardinal François de Tournon in 1552. He became bishop of Mondovì in 1566 and in the same year Pope Pius V sent him on a papal mission to urge Mary, Queen of Scots to restore Catholicism in her realm.
