= 1591 conclave =

Election of Catholic Pope Innocent IX

Papal conclave October 1591

Dates and location
- 27–29 October 1591; Apostolic Palace, Papal States

Key officials
- Dean: Alfonso Gesualdo
- Sub-dean: Innico d'Avalos d'Aragona
- Camerlengo: Enrico Caetani
- Protopriest: Mark Sittich von Hohenems
- Protodeacon: Andreas von Österreich

Election
- Ballots: 3

Elected pope
- Giovanni Facchinetti; Name taken: Innocent IX
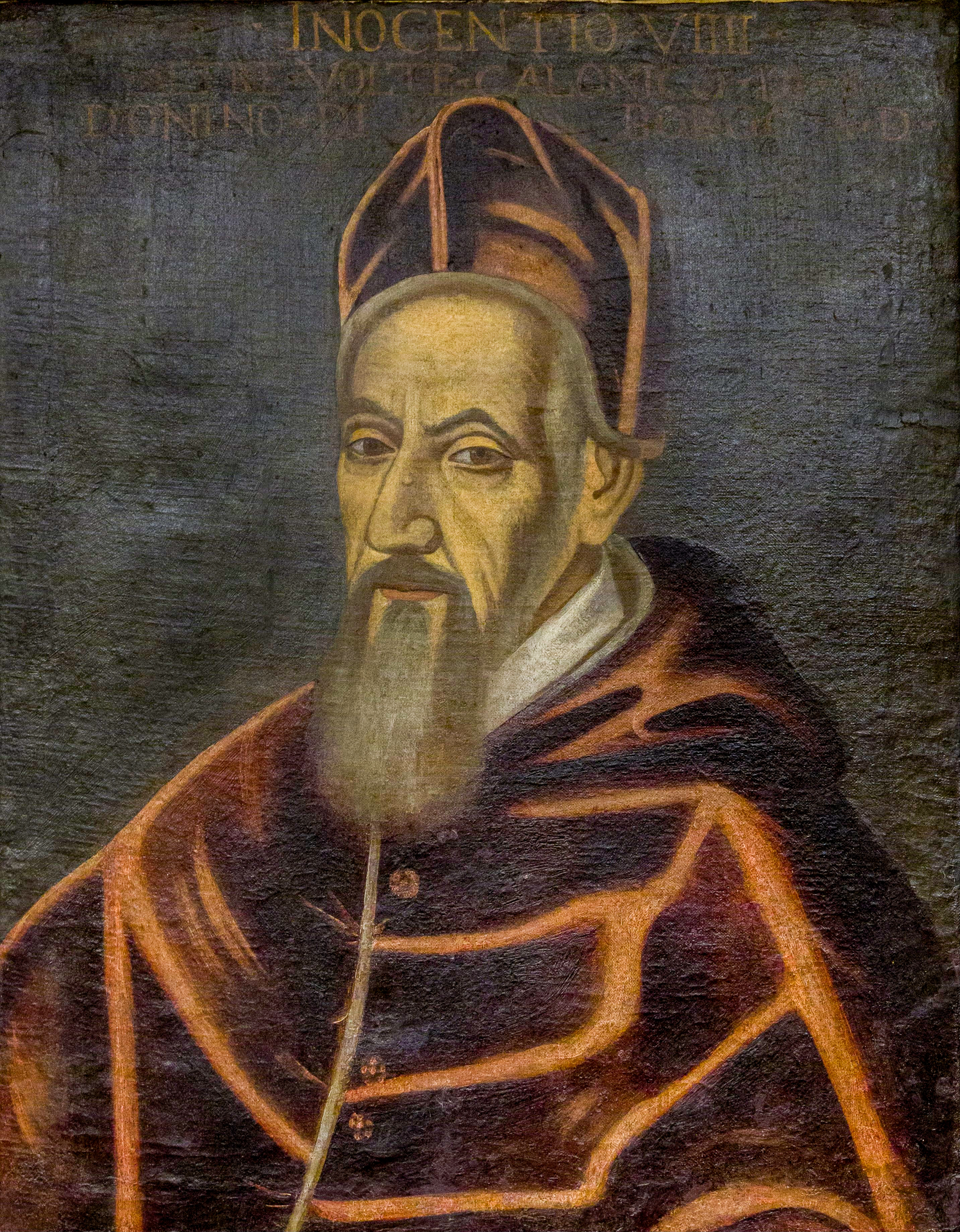

The 1591 conclave (27–29 October) was held after the death of Pope Gregory XIV on 16 October that year, after less than a year as pope. This left the Holy See vacant for the third time in 14 months. The conclave lasted only three days and elected Pope Innocent IX.

Even before Gregory XIV died, Spanish and anti-Spanish factions were electioneering for the next pope. Philip II of Spain's (r. 1556–1598) high-handed interference at the previous conclave was not forgotten: he had barred all but seven cardinals. This time the Spanish party in the College of Cardinals did not go so far, but they still controlled a majority, and after a quick conclave they raised Facchinetti to the papal chair as Pope Innocent IX. It took three ballots to elect him as pontiff. Facchinetti received 24 votes on 28 October but was not successful in that ballot to be elected as pope. He received 28 votes on 29 October in the second ballot while the third saw him prevail.
