= Pope Urban VII =

Head of the Catholic Church in 1590

- Bishop of Rome
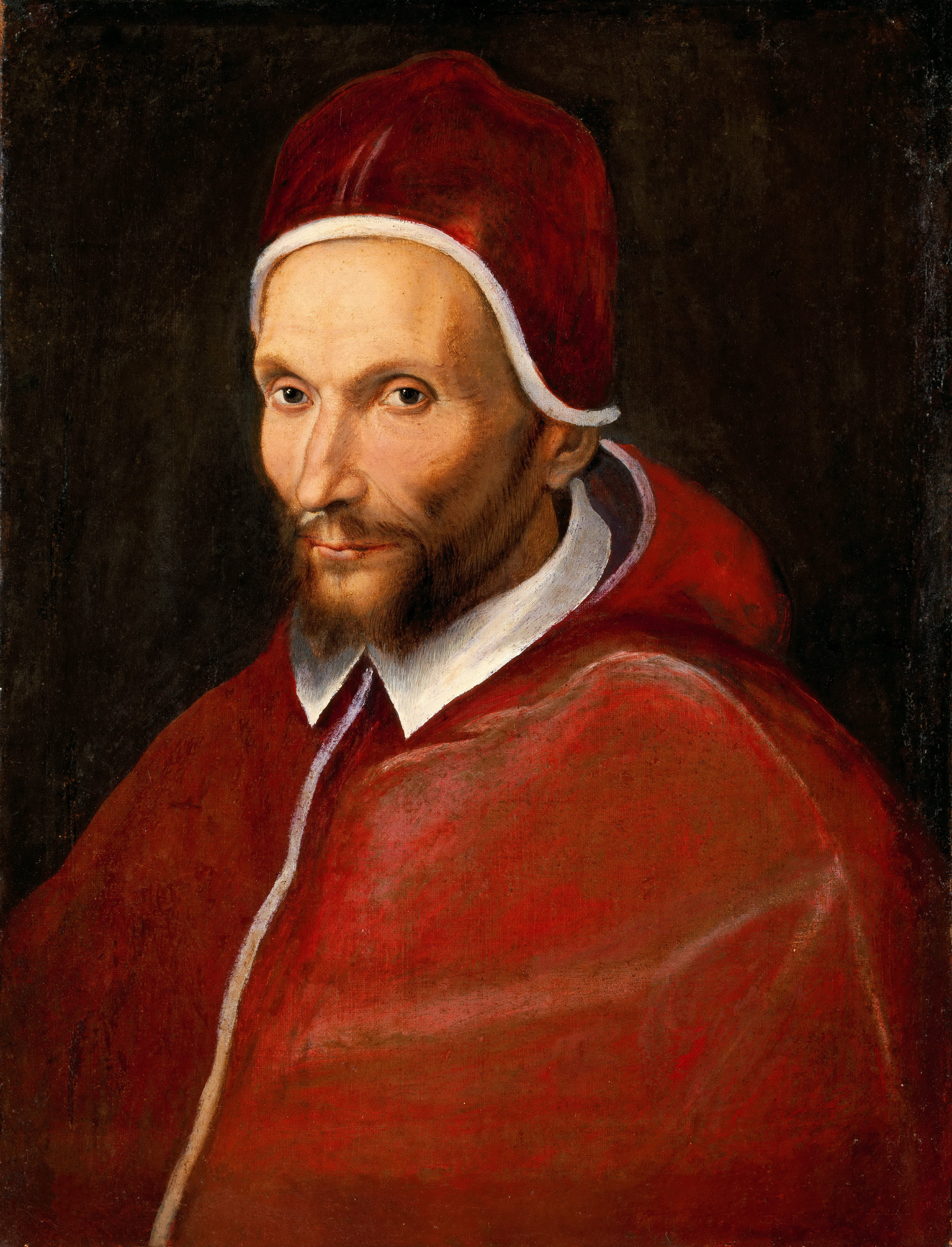
- Portrait by Jacopino del Conte, c. 1590
- Church: Catholic Church
- Papacy began: 15 September 1590
- Papacy ended: 27 September 1590
- Predecessor: Sixtus V
- Successor: Gregory XIV
- Previous posts: Archbishop of Rossano (1553); Governor of Fano (1555–1559); Governor of Perugia and Umbria (1559–1560); Apostolic Nuncio to Spain (1565–1572); Apostolic Nuncio to Venice (1573–1577); Governor of Bologna (1576–1577); Papal Legate to Flanders and Cologne (1578–1580); Cardinal-Priest of S. Marcello (1584–1590)

Orders
- Ordination: 30 March 1553 by Filippo Archinto
- Consecration: 4 April 1553 by Girolamo Verallo
- Created cardinal: 12 December 1583 by Gregory XIII

Personal details
- Born: Giovanni Battista Castagna; 4 August 1521 Rome, Papal States
- Died: 27 September 1590 (aged 69) Rome, Papal States

- Coat of arms

Pope Urban VII (Latin: Urbanus VII; Italian: Urbano VII; 4 August 1521 – 27 September 1590), born Giovanni Battista Castagna, was head of the Catholic Church, and leader of the Papal States from 15 to 27 September 1590. His papacy is the shortest recognized in history.

Castagna, born in Rome in 1521, was a highly educated man who held various positions within the Catholic Church and the structures of the Papal States of his day. He served as Governor of Fano, Perugia, and Umbria and, as the Archbishop of Rossano, participated in the Council of Trent. Later, he was appointed as the Apostolic Nuncio to Spain and Venice and served as the Papal legate to Flanders and to Cologne. He was elevated to the cardinalate in 1583 by Pope Gregory XIII.

Upon the death of Pope Sixtus V, Castagna was elected as pope on 15 September 1590, taking the name Urban VII. He was known for his charity, public works projects, and strict opposition to nepotism. His papacy was short-lived as he died of malaria on 27 September 1590, after just 12 days in office. Urban VII is remembered for instituting the world's first known public smoking ban, threatening excommunication for those using tobacco in or near a church.

== Biography ==
Giovanni Battista Castagna was born in Rome in 1521 to a noble family as the son of Cosimo Castagna of Genoa and his wife Costanza Ricci-Giacobazzi of Rome.

Castagna studied at universities in Italy. Shortly after finishing his studies at the University of Bologna with the award of a doctorate in civil and canon law, he became an auditor to his uncle, Cardinal Girolamo Verallo, whom he accompanied as datary on a papal legation to France.

Serving as a constitutional lawyer, Castagna entered the Roman Curia during the pontificate of Pope Julius III as the Referendary of the Apostolic Signatura. Though still a layman, on 1 March 1553 he was chosen to be the new Archbishop of Rossano. He quickly received all the minor and major orders, culminating in his ordination to the priesthood on 30 March 1553 in Rome. He then received episcopal consecration a month after, at the home of his uncle Cardinal Verallo.

He served as the governor of Fano from 1555 to 1559, and as the governor of Perugia and Umbria from 1559 to 1560. During the reign of Pius IV, he settled satisfactorily a long-standing boundary dispute between the inhabitants of Terni and Spoleto. Castagna participated in the Council of Trent from 1562 to 1563 and served as the president of several conciliar congregations. In 1565 came an appointment as the Apostolic Nuncio to Spain and served there until 1572, resigning his post from his archdiocese in 1573.

Among other positions, Castagna was the Apostolic Nuncio to Venice from 1573 to 1577, governor of Bologna from 1576 to 1577. Apostolic Nuncio to Venice, Papal Legate to Flanders from 1573 to 1577 and to Cologne from 1578 to 1580.

On 12 December 1583 Pope Gregory XIII made Castagna a cardinalate and he became Cardinal-Priest of San Marcello al Corso.

== Papacy ==
=== Election ===
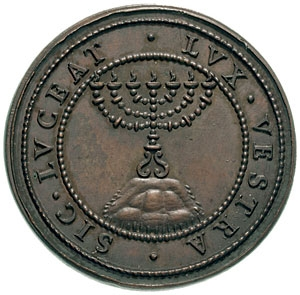
The reverse of a 1590 coin in honor of Urban VII, with a menorah and the legend SIC•LUCEAT•LUX•VESTRA (Let your light so shine – Matt. 5:16)

After the death of Pope Sixtus V, a conclave was convoked to elect a successor. Ferdinando I de' Medici, Grand Duke of Tuscany had been appointed a cardinal at the age of thirteen but was never ordained to the priesthood. At the age of thirty-eight, he resigned from the cardinalate upon the death of his older brother, Francesco in 1587, to succeed to the title. There were suspicions that Francesco and his wife died of arsenic poisoning after having dined at Ferdinando's Villa Medici, although one story has Ferdinando as the intended target of his sister-in-law. Ferdinando's foreign policy attempted to free Tuscany from Spanish domination.

He was consequently opposed to the election of any candidate supported by Spain. He persuaded Cardinal Alessandro Peretti di Montalto, grand-nephew of Sixtus V, to switch his support from Cardinal Marco Antonio Colonna, which brought the support of the younger cardinals who had been appointed by the Sixtus.

Castagna, a seasoned diplomat, moderate and of proven rectitude, was elected as pope on 15 September 1590 and selected the pontifical name of "Urban VII".

=== Activities ===
Urban VII was known for his charity to the poor. He subsidized Roman bakers so they could sell bread below cost, and restricted the spending on luxury items for members of his court. He subsidized public works projects throughout the Papal States. Urban VII was strictly against nepotism and he forbade it within the Roman Curia.

His short reign gave rise to the world's first known public smoking ban, as he threatened to excommunicate anyone who "took tobacco in the porchway of or inside a church, whether it be by chewing it, smoking it with a pipe or sniffing it in powdered form through the nose".

== Death ==
Urban VII died in Rome on 27 September 1590 of malaria. He had reigned for only 12 days and died before he could be crowned. He was buried at St. Peter's Basilica. His remains were transferred to Santa Maria sopra Minerva on 21 September 1606.

His estate, valued at 30,000 to 32,000 scudi, was bequeathed to the Confraternity of the Annunziata alla Minerva for use as dowries for poor young girls.

== See also ==
- List of popes

Catholic Church titles
| Preceded by Sixtus V | Pope; 15–27 September 1590 | Succeeded by Gregory XIV |
