= September 1590 conclave =

Election of Catholic Pope Urban VII

Papal conclave September 1590

Dates and location
- 7–15 September 1590; Apostolic Palace, Papal States

Key officials
- Dean: Giovanni Antonio Serbelloni
- Sub-dean: Alfonso Gesualdo
- Camerlengo: Enrico Caetani
- Protopriest: Mark Sittich von Hohenems
- Protodeacon: Andreas von Österreich

Elected pope
- Giovanni Castagna; Name taken: Urban VII
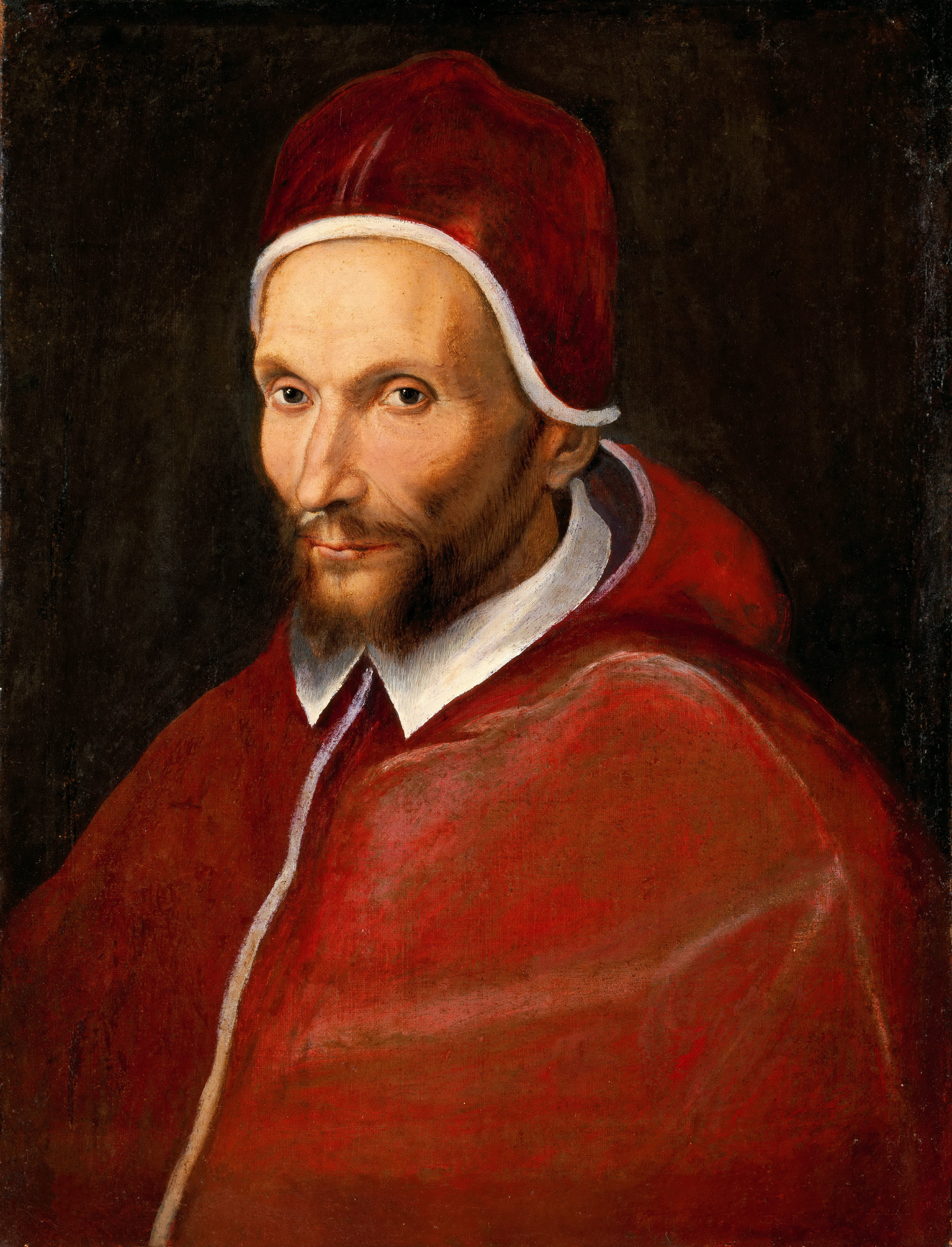

In September 1590, a conclave attended by 54 cardinals elected Cardinal Giovanni Castagna as Pope Urban VII.

The conclave lasted a week, and was heavily swayed by the influence of the twenty-two Spanish cardinals. Castagna, who had been favored by Sixtus V as a successor and was on the list of candidates whom Philip II of Spain had approved, was a favorite from the beginning, although a significant opposing faction supported Marco Antonio Colonna. Castagna's poor health, which would ultimately kill him after a papacy of only thirteen days, made him a more palatable candidate to cardinals who were outraged at Philip's attempts to sway the election.

Contemporary newspapers reported that a disagreement between Cardinals Ascanio Colonna and Francesco Sforza di Santa Fiora during the conclave nearly became violent.

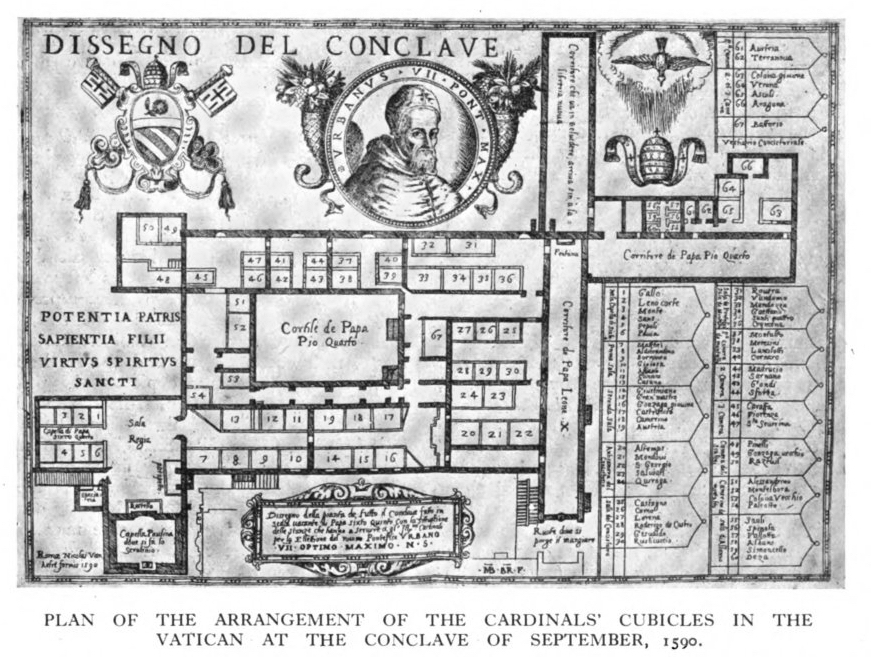
Diagram of the cardinals' cubicles at the 1590 papal conclave.

== Sources ==
- Marcora, Carlo (1964). "Il Cardinal Federico Borromeo ed i Conclavi." (in Italian). In: Memorie storiche della Diocesi di Milano. Vol. XII (Milano: Biblioteca Ambrosiana 1964), pp. 61-100.
