= Pope Innocent IX =

Head of the Catholic Church in 1591

- Bishop of Rome
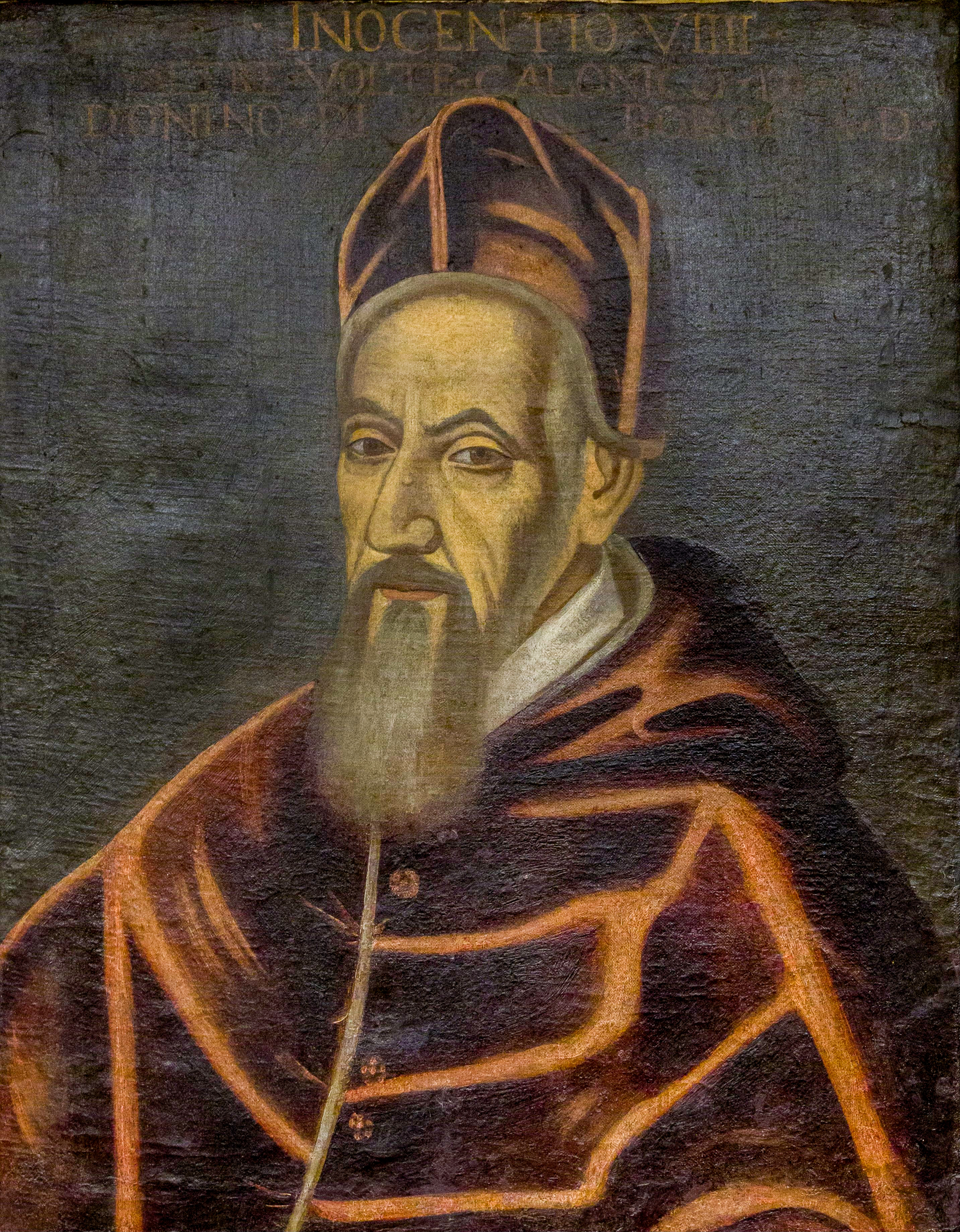
- Portrait after Hieronymus Wierix, early 17th century
- Church: Catholic Church
- Papacy began: 29 October 1591
- Papacy ended: 30 December 1591
- Predecessor: Gregory XIV
- Successor: Clement VIII
- Previous posts: Governor of Parma (1556–1558); Referendary of the Apostolic Signatura (1559–1560); Bishop of Nicastro (1560–1575); Latin Patriarch of Jerusalem (1572–1585); Cardinal-Priest of Santi Quattro Coronati (1584–1591); Prefect of the Apostolic Signatura (1591)

Orders
- Ordination: 11 March 1544
- Consecration: 1560
- Created cardinal: 12 December 1583 by Gregory XIII

Personal details
- Born: Giovanni Antonio Facchinetti; 20 July 1519 Bologna, Papal States
- Died: 30 December 1591 (aged 72) Rome, Papal States
- Education: University of Bologna

- Coat of arms

Pope Innocent IX (Latin: Innocentius IX; Italian: Innocenzo IX; 20 July 1519 – 30 December 1591), born Giovanni Antonio Facchinetti, was head of the Catholic Church and ruler of the Papal States from 29 October to 30 December 1591.

Prior to his short papacy, he had been a canon lawyer, diplomat, and chief administrator during the reign of Pope Gregory XIV (r. 1590–1591).

He entered the service of the influential Cardinal Alessandro Farnese. As papal legate to Venice, he helped negotiate the formation of the Holy League, an alliance of Spanish and Italian maritime powers to challenge the Ottoman Empire’s control of the eastern Mediterranean, and which resulted in victory at the Battle of Lepanto.

== Biography ==
=== Early life ===
Giovanni Antonio Facchinetti was born in Bologna on 22 July 1519 to Antonio Della Noce from Cravegna and Francesca Cini from Croveo.

His father was a descendant of the noble Della Noce family of Ossola, but not himself wealthy. Upon moving to Bologna to work as a servant, Della Noce was given the soprannome (a nickname serving as an unofficial family name) of Facchinetti, meaning "porter." Giovanni Antonio Facchinetti did not go by Della Noce and instead assumed his father's modest soprannome. He nonetheless maintained close ties with Ossola throughout his life, and used the coat of arms of his noble heritage.

Some sources state that Facchinetti came from a Veronese family. This appears to derive from a mistake made by a historian in 1906, who confused Novara (in Piedmont) with Nogara (in Verona) when interpreting ecclesiastical records.

=== Education ===
Facchinetti studied at the University of Bologna - which was pre-eminent in jurisprudence — where he obtained a doctorate in both civil and canon law in 1544. He was later ordained to the priesthood on 11 March 1544 and was appointed a canon of the church of Saints Gervasio and Protasio of Domodossola in 1547.

Giovanni traveled to Rome and he became the secretary to Cardinal Niccolò Ardinghelli. He entered the service of Cardinal Alessandro Farnese, the Archbishop of Avignon, who sent Facchinetti to Avignon as his ecclesiastical representative and subsequently recalled him to the management of his affairs at Parma. He was also made the Referendary of the Apostolic Signatura in 1559 and held that post for a year.

=== Episcopate and cardinalate ===
In 1560, Facchinetti was named as the Bishop of Nicastro, in Calabria, and in 1562 was present at the Council of Trent. He was the first bishop to actually reside in the diocese in three decades. Pope Pius V (1566–1572) sent him as papal nuncio to Venice in 1566 to further the papal alliance with Spain and Venice against the Turks, which ultimately resulted in the victory of Lepanto in 1571. He was recalled from Venice in 1572 and was made the Prior Commendatario of Sant'Andrea di Carmignano in the diocese of Padua from 1576 to 1587.

Relinquishing his see to pursue his career in Rome in 1575 and also because of health reasons, he was named the Titular Latin Patriarch of Jerusalem in 1572. He occupied that post until he was made a cardinal. Pope Gregory XIII made him a cardinal on 12 December 1583 as the Cardinal-Priest of Santi Quattro Coronati and he was to receive the red hat and title on 9 January 1584. Pope Gregory XIV made him the Prefect of the Apostolic Signatura in 1591.

== Papacy ==
Papal styles of Pope Innocent IX
- Reference style: His Holiness
- Spoken style: Your Holiness
- Religious style: Holy Father
- Posthumous style: None

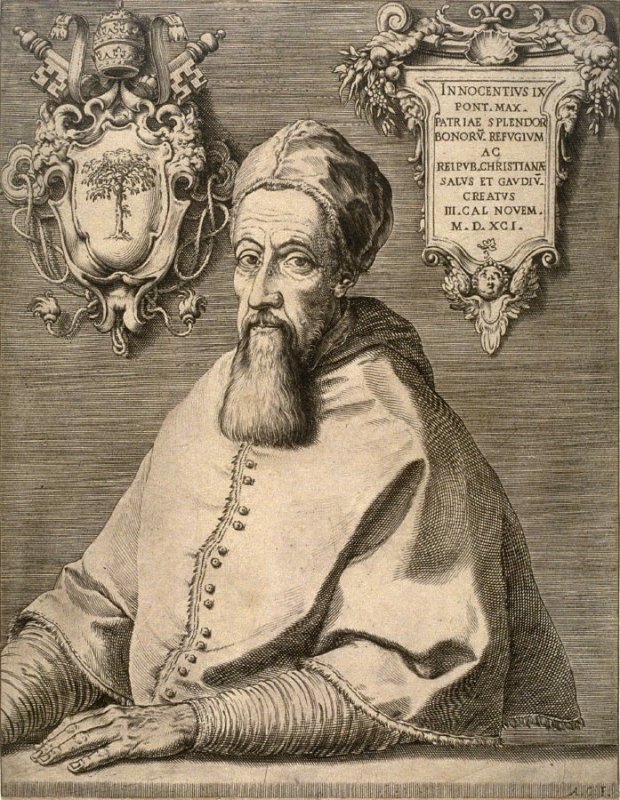
Portrait engraving of Innocent IX by Agostino Carracci, 1591

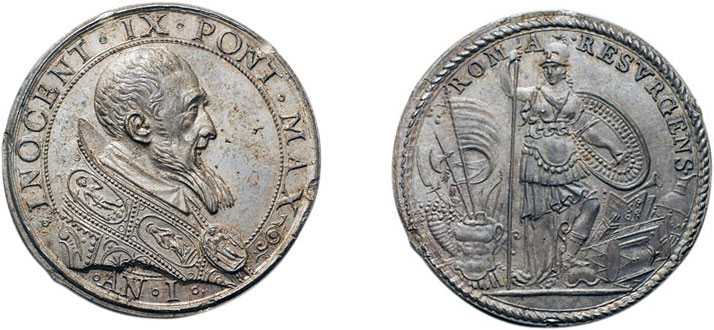
Medal of Innocent IX (1591).

Even before Pope Gregory XIV died, Spanish and anti-Spanish factions were electioneering for the next pope. Philip II of Spain's (r. 1556–1598) high-handed interference at the previous conclave was not forgotten: he had barred all but seven cardinals. This time the Spanish party in the College of Cardinals did not go so far, but they still controlled a majority, and after a quick conclave they raised Facchinetti to the papal chair as Pope Innocent IX. It took three ballots to elect him as pope. Facchinetti received 24 votes on 28 October but was not successful. He received 28 votes on 29 October in the second ballot while the third saw him prevail. Facchinetti took his papal name to honor Pope Innocent III.

The cardinal protodeacon Andreas von Austria crowned Innocent IX as pontiff on 3 November 1591. He elevated two cardinals to the cardinalate in the only papal consistory of his papacy on 18 December 1591.

Mindful of the origin of his success, Innocent IX supported, during his two months' pontificate, the cause of Philip II and the Catholic League against Henry IV of France (r. 1589–1610) in the French Wars of Religion (1562–1598), where a Papal army was in the field.

His grandnephew Giovanni Antonio Cardinal Facchinetti de Nuce Jr., was one of two cardinals appointed during the weeks of Innocent IX's pontificate. A later member of the cardinalate was his great-grandnephew Cesare Facchinetti (made a cardinal in 1643).

== Death ==
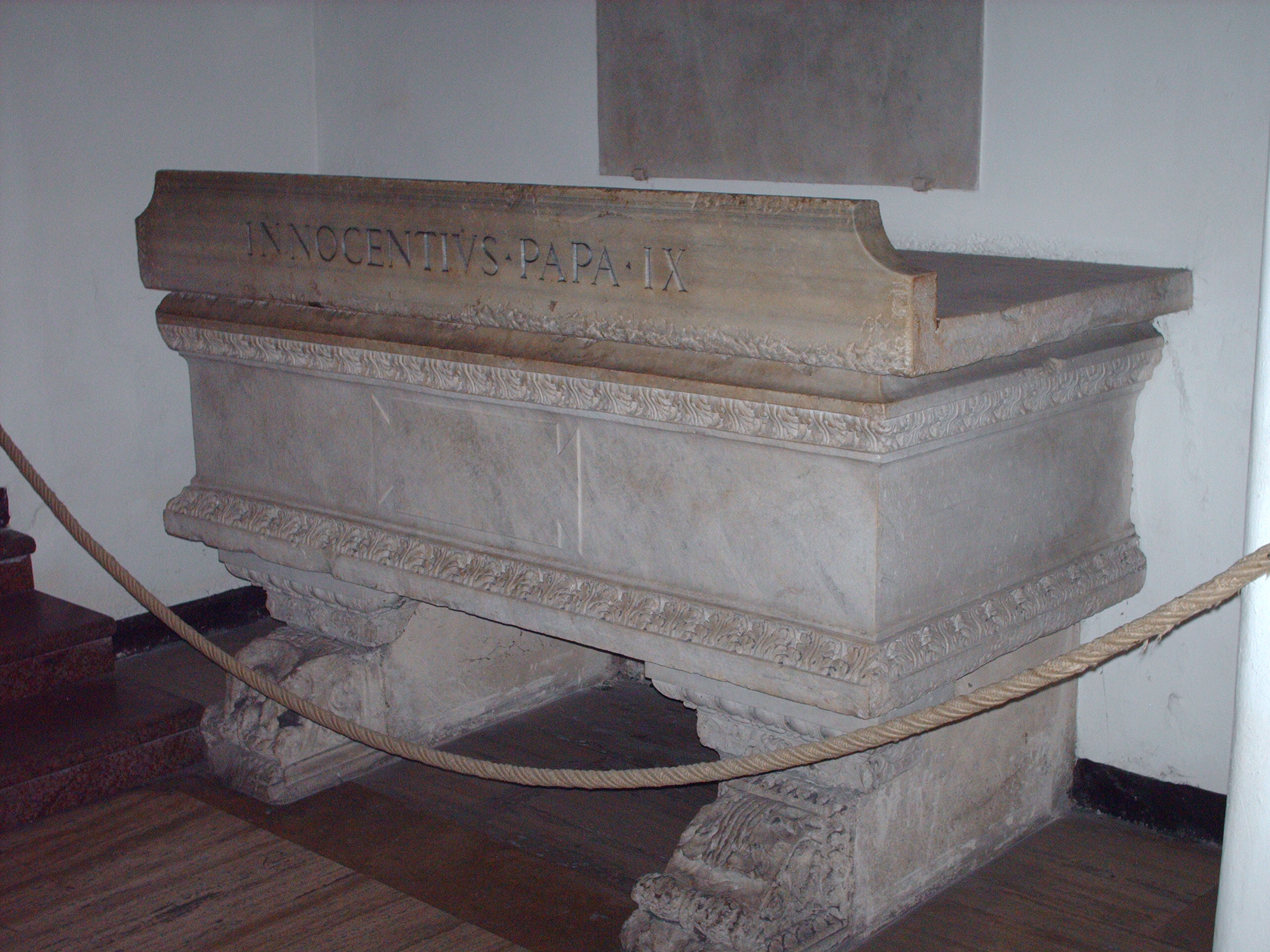
Tomb of Innocent IX in the Vatican Grottoes.

On 18 December, despite being ill, the pope made a pilgrimage of Rome's seven pilgrimage churches and caught a cold as a result. This became a heavy cough combined with a fever that led to his death shortly after he received Extreme Unction.

Innocent IX died in the early morning of 30 December 1591. He was buried in the Vatican Grottoes in a simple tomb.

== See also ==
- Cardinals created by Innocent IX
- Popes named Innocent

== Sources ==
- Germe-Tizon, Anne-Cecile (2002). "Innocent IX". In Levillain, Philippe; O'Malley, John W. (eds.). The Papacy. Vol. 2: Gaius-Proxies. Routledge. p. 800.
- Grendler, Paul F. (1971). "The Concept of Humanist in Cinquecento Italy". In Molho, Anthony; Tedeschi, John A. (eds.). Renaissance: Studies in Honor of Hans Baron. Northern Illinois University Press.
- Martin, John (1993). Venice's Hidden Enemies: Italian Heretics in a Renaissance City. University of California Press.
- McBrien, Richard P. (2000). Lives of the Popes. HarperCollins.
- Weber, Nicholas (1910). "Pope Innocent IX". The Catholic Encyclopedia. Vol. 8. Robert Appleton Company.

Catholic Church titles
Unknown	Titular Latin Patriarch of Jerusalem; 1572–85	Succeeded by Scipione Gonzaga
Preceded by Gregory XIV	Pope; 29 October – 30 December 1591	Succeeded by Clement VIII
