= Terme della Rotonda (Catania) =

Roman public baths in Catania, Sicily

Coordinates: 37.50394°N 15.08262°E

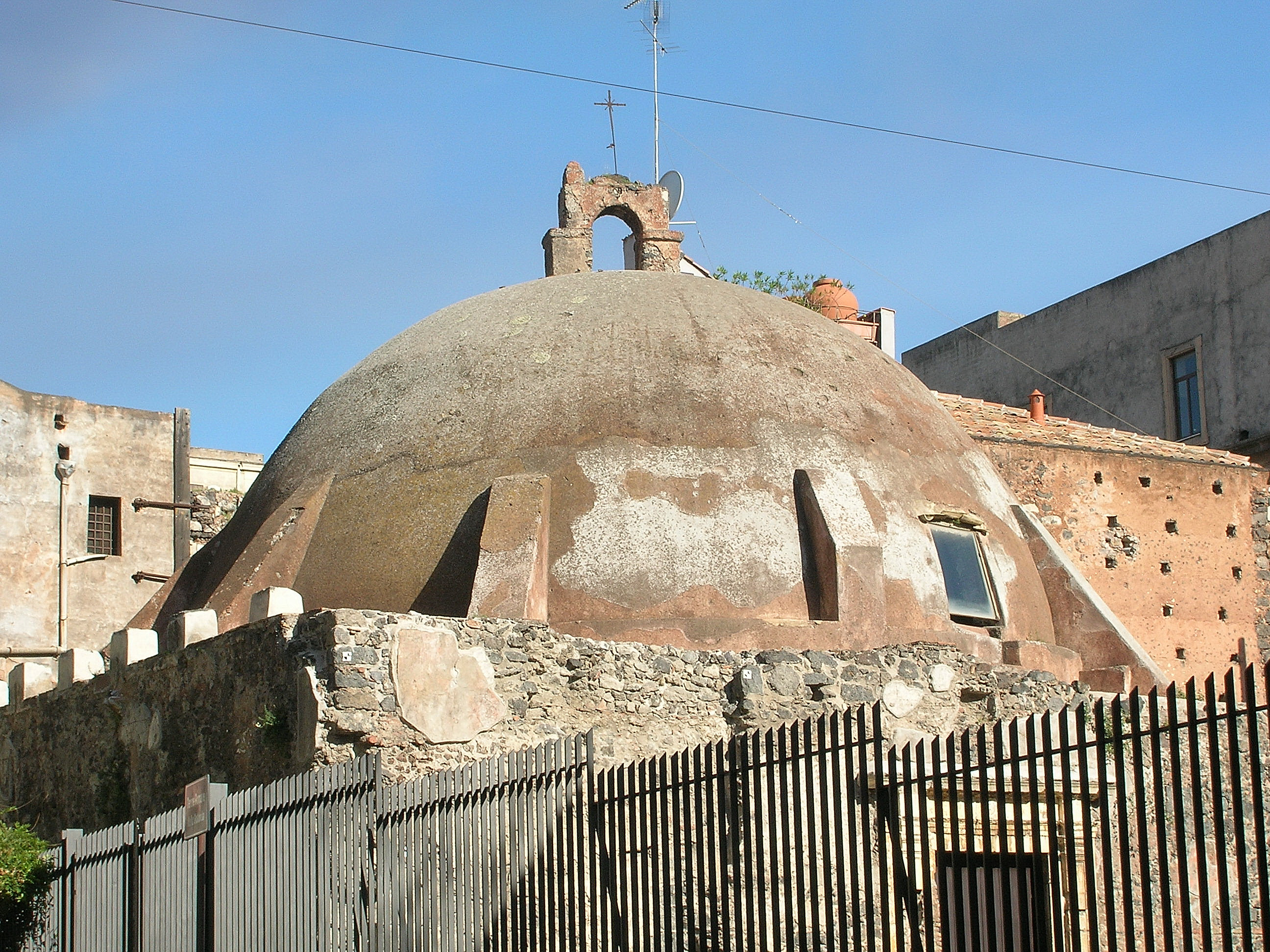
The dome of the church of Santa Maria della Rotonda

The Baths of the Rotonda (Italian: Terme della Rotonda) are the archaeological remains of a Roman public bath complex located in Catania, Sicily. Dating from between the 1st and 2nd centuries CE, the baths lie in close proximity to the Roman Theatre and the Odeon.

During the Byzantine era, the site was transformed with the construction of the church of Santa Maria della Rotonda, recognizable for its distinctive dome built directly upon the ancient Roman structure. The church's interior walls still preserve remarkable medieval and Baroque frescoes.

== History ==
According to recent studies carried out in 2004–2008 and again in 2015, the Terme della Rotonda would date back to the 1st–2nd century CE. Enlarged during the 3rd century CE (a period of considerable enrichment for the city of Catania) the thermae were then abandoned. Towards the end of the 6th century CE, and in the Byzantine era, a church was then built on the Roman ruins. Alongside the Bonajuto Chapel, La Rotonda represents the only surviving Byzantine building in Catania.

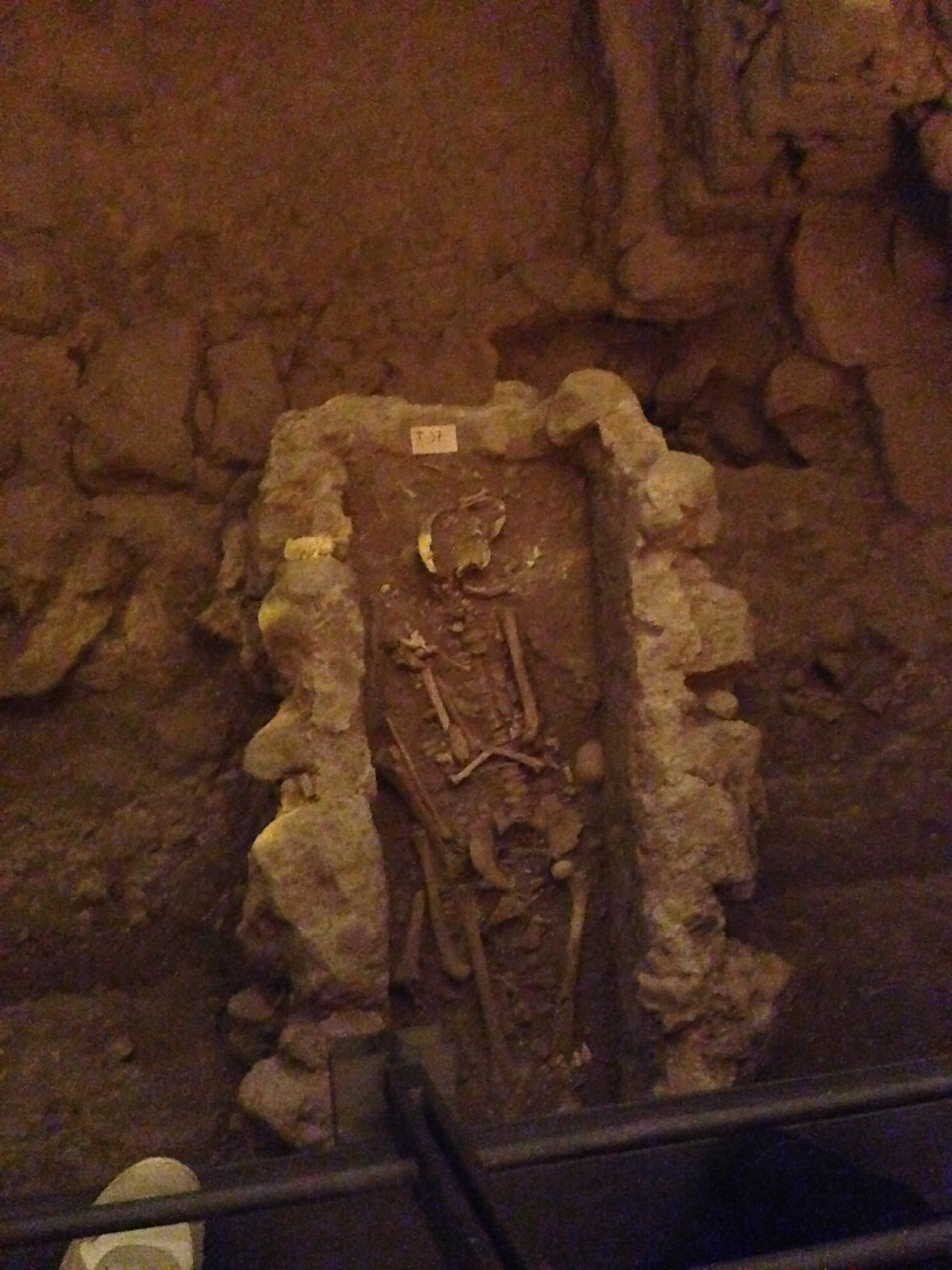
One of the Medieval tombs

Arguably dedicated to St Mary the Virgin since its first establishment, the church was originally oriented to the North. From the 9th century to the 16th century, the grounds surrounding the church were used as a graveyard, and several tombs can still be seen amidst the ruins of the Roman baths. The 1169 Sicily earthquake partly destroyed the Byzantine chancel. The church was then re-oriented to the East, and a new ogival portal was opened on the West wall, opposite the new altar. In the 16th century, a new entrance was opened on the South wall, and the church was again re-oriented to the North.

The building was long considered to be the oldest church in Catania, an inscription originally placed above the entrance suggesting that St Peter himself had consecrated it to St Mary in 44 AD. Early modern historians believed the dome to be a Roman structure, and many went as far as to conjecture that it may have served as a model for the Roman pantheon. This tradition held sway until the 18th century, when the Roman baths were unearthed, and the dome revealed to be of later construction. Ignazio Paternò Castello, an eighteenth-century Sicilian aristocrat and archaeologist, interpreted the baths as part of a more extensive spa complex extending as far West as Piazza Dante.

The church was damaged in the 1943 bombing, which completely destroyed the nearby church of Santa Maria della Cava. Between the 1940s and 1950s works were carried out to consolidate the structure. As part of these "conservation" activities directed by Guido Libertini, many of the frescos that covered the walls of Santa Maria della Rotonda were removed.

Between 2004 and 2008, excavations were performed in the church and in the nearby area. This led to the discovery of nine rooms and several tombs. In 2015, the entire block to the North of the church was expropriated, and excavations were carried out in the area. As part of these excavations, archaeologists brought to light an imposing Castellum aquae connected to a branch of the Roman aqueduct of Catania as well as a quadrangular courtyard surrounded by exedras, which is best interpreted as the original entrance to the thermae.

== Description ==
=== Roman thermae ===
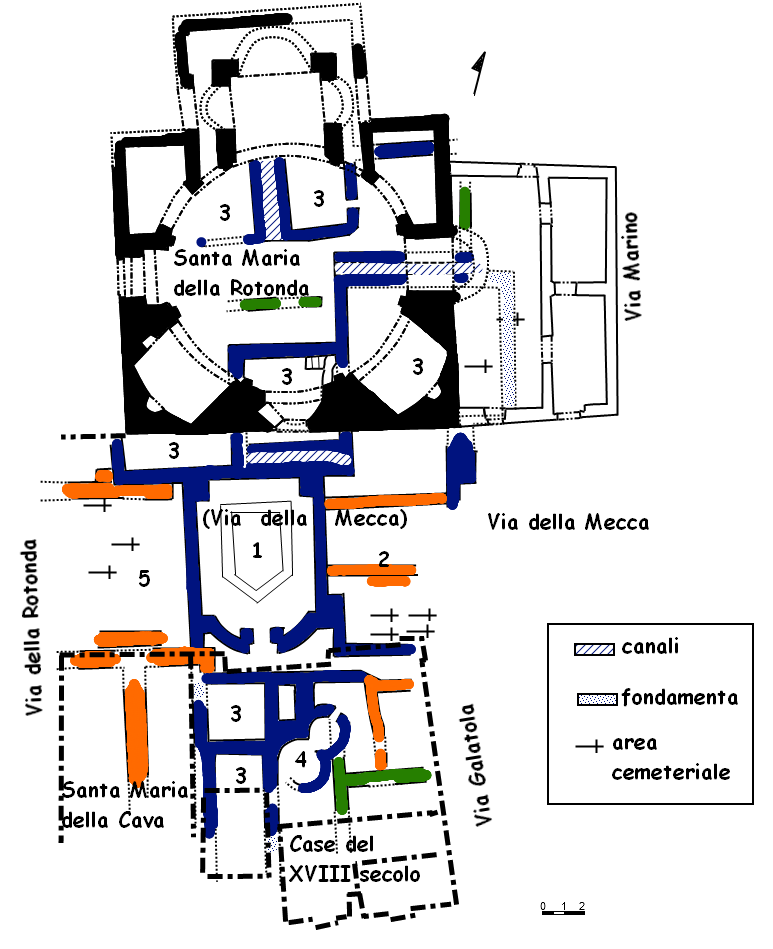

The thermae consisted of several rooms and pools. The main room (number 1 in the picture) was arguably a frigidarium, a room with a cold bath. To the East is the calidarium, a room with a hot water bath (number 2). This room was heated through a Hypocaust system beneath the floor. The pilae stacks (or suspensurae) which once supported the floor are still clearly visible. To the West of the frigidarium is a large room paved with marble slabs. To the South are several other rooms dating to the 2nd and 3rd century: two small circular rooms (perhaps saunas – number 4 in the picture on the right) with hypocaust floors, and a tepidarium, a room with a warm bath. Other quadrangular rooms are to the North of the frigidarium, in the area where the church now stands. The remains of the Castellum aquae, a tank or reservoir connected to the aqueduct, and a courtyard surrounded by exedras that served as the main entrance to the baths, can still be seen next to the church.

=== Church ===
The building, with a square plan, has two entrances – one on the South wall, with a 16th-century limestone portal, and one on the West wall, with a 13th-century Gothic portal. The main chancel is opposite the South portal and the remains of a second one can be seen to the right of the main entrance. The dome is 11 m in diameter.

=== Frescoes ===
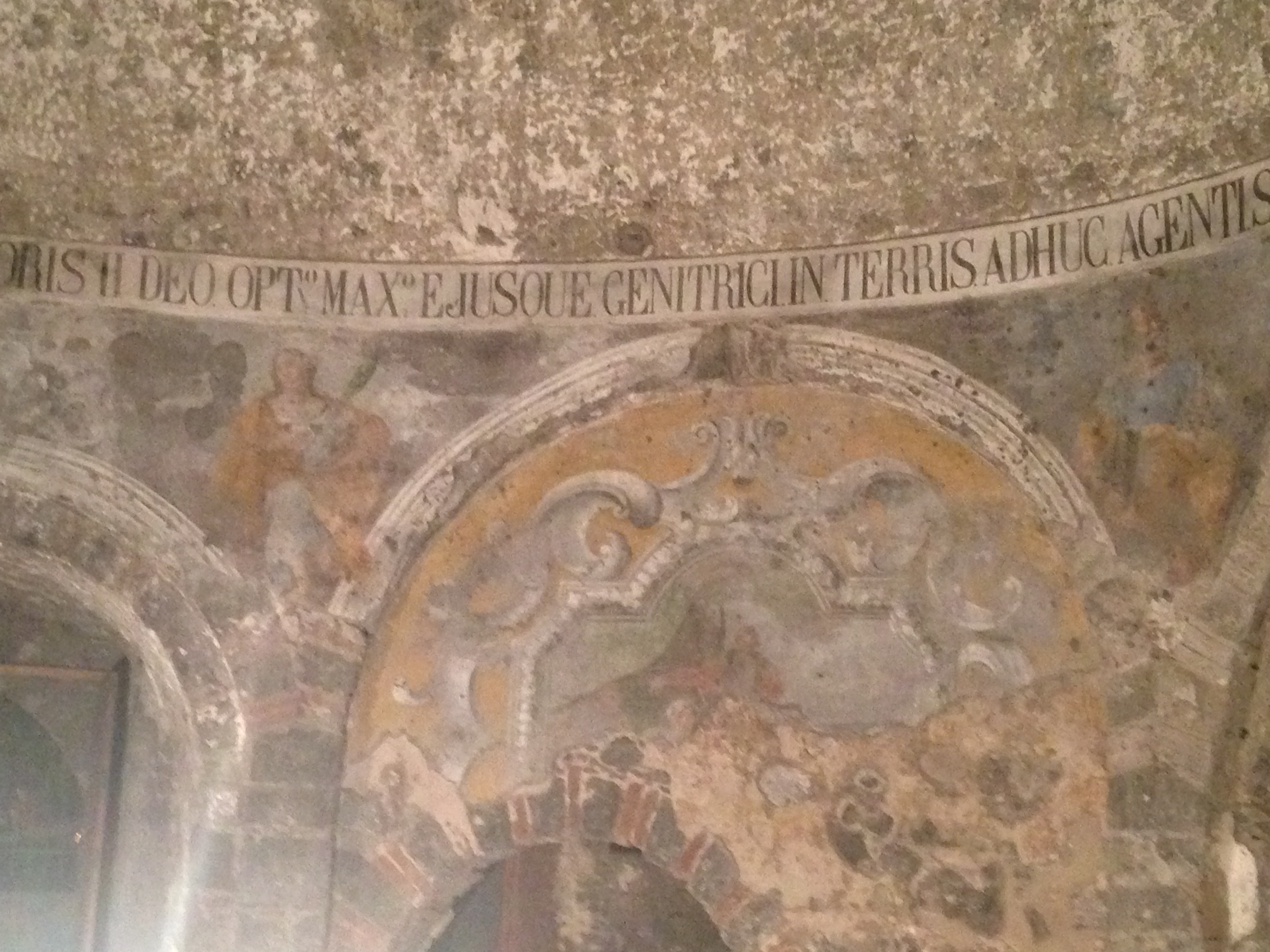
St Agatha and St Peter

The "restorations" carried out by Guido Libertini in the 1950s led to the destruction of most of the frescoes that once covered the interior walls of the Church of Santa Maria della Rotonda. Nevertheless, the chancel still preserves fine medieval frescoes. The figures of two saints can be seen in the western apse (on the left hand side as you enter the chancel). The first one, on the right, represents St. Nicholas and dates back to the 12th century. Other studies identify him as St Gregory Thaumaturgus, bishop of Neocaesarea, but this interpretation seems less likely. The second fresco, on the left, is certainly later (13th century) and represents St. Leo of Catania, also known as the Wonderworker – the caption Ο ΑΓΙΟΣ ΛΕΟΝ, in Greek characters, is clearly legible on the left. Traces of an Annunciation, also from the 13th century, and fragments of Byzantine decorations can be seen on the eastern wall of the chancel. The baroque frescoes at the base of the dome represent St. Peter, St. Paul, St. Agatha, and St. Lucy alongside the Evangelists Luke, Matthew, Mark, and John. Above these figures, a Latin inscription reads:

QUOD INANI DEORUM OMNIUM VENERATIONI SUPERSTITIOSÆ CATANENSIUM EREXERAT PIETAS IDEM HOC PROFUGATO EMENTITÆ RELIGIONIS ERRORE IPISIS NASCENTIS FIDEI EXORDIIS DIVUS PETRUS APOSTOLORUM PRINCEPS ANO GRATIÆ 44 CLAUDII IMPERATORIS II. DEO. OP. MAX. EIUSQUE GENITRICI IN TERRIS ADHUC AGENTI SACRAVIT PANTHEON.

== General bibliography ==
- Maria Grazia Branciforti, Claudia Guastella (eds), Le Terme della Rotonda di Catania, Palermo: Regione Siciliana, 2008.
- Giovanna Buda, Fabrizio Nicoletti, Viviana Spinella, Catania. Scavi e restauri a nord della Rotonda, in F. Nicoletti (ed), Catania Antica. Nuove prospettive di ricerca, Palermo: Regione Siciliana, 2015, pp. 507–572.
- Vincenzo Cordaro Clarenza, Osservazioni sopra la storia di Catania, cavate dalla Storia Generale di Sicilia, Catania, Salvatore Riggio, 1833, volume 1.
- Francesco Ferrara, Storia di Catania sino alla fine del Secolo XVIII, Catania, 1829.
- Giovanni Florio Castelli, Memorie storiche intorno la distruzione dei vetusti monumenti in Catania, Catania: Tip. Caronda, 1866.
- Francesco Giordano, La Rotonda – Mito e verità di un Tempio catanese, Catania: Edizioni Greco, 1997, ISBN 978-88-7512-492-2
- Guido Libertini, Scoperte recenti riguardanti l'età bizantina a Catania e provincia. La trasformazione di un edificio termale in chiesa bizantina (La Rotonda), in Atti dell'VIII Congresso Internazionale di Studi bizantini, Palermo, 3–10 aprile 1951, Roma, Associazione nazionale per gli studi bizantini, 1953.
- Francesco Paternò Castello di Carcaci, Descrizione di Catania e delle cose notevoli ne' dintorni di essa, Catania, 1841.
- Ignazio Paternò Castello, Viaggio per tutte le antichità della Sicilia, Napoli: Stamperia Simoniana, 1781.
- Giuseppe Rasà Napoli, Guida alle chiese di Catania e breve illustrazione delle chiese di Catania e sobborghi, Catania: 1900.
