= Piazza Dante =

Piazza Dante may refer to:

- Piazza Dante, Catania
- Piazza Dante, Genoa
- Piazza Dante, Grosseto
- Piazza Dante, Naples
- Piazza Dante, Pisa
- Piazza Dante, Rome
- Piazza dei Signori, Verona, also known as Piazza Dante
