= Sandro La Vignera =

Italian academic (born 1977)

- Born: Catania, Italy
- Education: University of Catania (BS)
- Scientific career
- Fields: Endocrinology
- Workplaces: University of Catania
- Website: sandrolavignera.it

Sandro La Vignera (born 27 July 1977 in Catania, Italy) is a Full Professor of endocrinology, faculty of medicine at the University of Catania. He works at the University Hospital “Policlinico G. Rodolico” of Catania at the Operative Unit of Endocrinology. From 2017 present in the Top World Scientist ranking published by Plos Biology (best scientists in the world for scientific productivity).

== Education ==
La Vignera earned his M.D. in 2002 at the University of Catania, the postgraduate degree in endocrinology in 2007 and a Ph.D. in andrological science, human reproduction and biotechnologies in 2012.

== Research and career ==
La Vignera started his research career on reproductive endocrinology and male sexuality. Since 2012, he is assistant professor of endocrinology at the University Teaching Hospital “Policlinico-Vittorio Emanuele”, University of Catania. He is the senior researcher and professor of andrology and endocrinology at the University of Catania. He has also been awarded the National Scientific Qualification as full professor of endocrinology.

He authored over 420 publications in peer-reviewed journals on Scopus. The research activity mainly focused on the endocrinological aspects of reproduction and human sexuality.

== Awards and honors ==
Professor Sandro La Vignera is a specialist in Endocrinology, PhD in Andrological Sciences. Holds current positions: Professor of Endocrinology at the University of Catania. National Scientific Qualification as Full Professor of Endocrinology (from September 2018). Awarded as Best Under 40 Researcher in 2017 by the Italian Society of Endocrinology. Included in the “Top Worldwide Scientists Database” in 2017, 2019, 2020 by Plos Biology. Board Member of the Master of Reproductive Biotechnology of the University of Catania. Delegate for the Sicilian Regional Health Department for continuing medical education. Academician of the European Academy of Andrology. Treasurer of the Italian Society of Andrology and Medicine of Sexuality. Member of the Regional Executive Council of the Italian Society of Endocrinology. Member of the Editorial Board of : “Scientific Reports-Nature”, “Journal of Clinical Medicine”, “Annals of Translational Medicine”, “Androgens: Clinical Research and Therapeutics”, "Therapeutic Advances in Endocrinology and Metabolism", “Frontiers in Endocrinology”. Author of over 420 publications in indexed journals on Pubmed. Research-lines: “Endocrinological aspects of Reproduction and Human Sexuality”.

== Selected publications ==
- La Vignera, Sandro; Condorelli, Rosita A.; Calogero, Aldo E.; Cannarella, Rossella; Mongioì, Laura M.; Duca, Ylenia; Cimino, Laura; Giacone, Filippo; Aversa, Antonio (2020). "Symptomatic late-onset hypogonadism but normal total testosterone: the importance of testosterone annual decrease velocity". Annals of Translational Medicine. 8 (5): 163. doi:10.21037/atm.2019.11.48. PMC 7154449. PMID 32309310.
- La Vignera, Sandro; Cannarella, Rossella; Condorelli, Rosita A.; Calogero, Aldo E. (13 March 2020). "Disorders of Puberty: Endocrinology of the Pre-Pubertal Testis". Journal of Clinical Medicine. 9 (3): 780. doi:10.3390/jcm9030780. PMC 7141315. PMID 32182985.
- La Vignera, Sandro; Condorelli, Rosita A.; Cannarella, Rossella; Giacone, Filippo; Calogero, Aldo E. (2019). "Arterial erectile dysfunction is an early sign of vascular damage: the importance for the prevention of cardiovascular health". Annals of Translational Medicine. 7 (Suppl 3): S124. doi:10.21037/atm.2019.05.61. PMC 6685877. PMID 31576331.
- La Vignera, Sandro; Condorelli, Rosita A.; Cannarella, Rossella; Calogero, Aldo E. (2019). "Thyroid Prostate Axis. Does It Really Exist?". The World Journal of Men's Health. 37 (3): 257–260. doi:10.5534/wjmh.190060. PMC 6704311. PMID 31190488.
- La Vignera, Sandro; Condorelli, Rosita A.; Cannarella, Rossella; Duca, Ylenia; Calogero, Aldo E. (19 November 2018). "Sport, doping and female fertility". Reproductive Biology and Endocrinology. 16 (1): 108. doi:10.1186/s12958-018-0437-8. PMC 6241032. PMID 30449281.
- La Vignera, Sandro; Vita, Roberto; Condorelli, Rosita A.; Mongioì, Laura M.; Presti, Silvia; Benvenga, Salvatore; Calogero, Aldo E. (20 April 2017). "Impact of thyroid disease on testicular function". Endocrine. 58 (3): 397–407. doi:10.1007/s12020-017-1303-8. PMID 28429281. S2CID 31005098.
- La Vignera, S.; Condorelli, R. A.; Russo, G. I.; Morgia, G.; Calogero, A. E. (May 2016). "Endocrine control of benign prostatic hyperplasia". Andrology. 4 (3): 404–411. doi:10.1111/andr.12186. PMID 27089546.
- La Vignera, S.; Condorelli, R. A.; Di Mauro, M.; Lo Presti, D.; Mongioì, L. M.; Russo, G.; Calogero, A. E. (November 2015). "Reproductive function in male patients with type 1 diabetes mellitus". Andrology. 3 (6): 1082–1087. doi:10.1111/andr.12097. PMID 26446574. S2CID 207011446.
- La Vignera, S.; Vicari, E.; Condorelli, R.A.; Franchina, C.; Scalia, G.; Morgia, G.; Perino, A.; Schillaci, R.; Calogero, A.E. (April 2015). "Prevalence of human papilloma virus infection in patients with male accessory gland infection". Reproductive BioMedicine Online. 30 (4): 385–391. doi:10.1016/j.rbmo.2014.12.016. PMID 25684094.
- La Vignera, S.; Condorelli, R. A.; Burgio, G.; Vicari, E.; Favilla, V.; Russo, G. I.; Cimino, S.; Morgia, G.; Calogero, A. E. (September 2014). "Functional characterization of platelets in patients with arterial erectile dysfunction". Andrology. 2 (5): 709–715. doi:10.1111/j.2047-2927.2014.00255.x. PMID 25070238. S2CID 22728158.
- La Vignera, Sandro; Condorelli, Rosita A.; Vicari, Enzo; Salmeri, Mario; Morgia, Giuseppe; Favilla, Vincenzo; Cimino, Sebastiano; Calogero, Aldo E. (1 January 2014). "Microbiological investigation in male infertility: a practical overview". Journal of Medical Microbiology. 63 (1): 1–14. doi:10.1099/jmm.0.062968-0. PMID 24072761.
- La Vignera, Sandro; Condorelli, Rosita A; Balercia, Giancarlo; Vicari, Enzo; Calogero, Aldo E (March 2013). "Does alcohol have any effect on male reproductive function? A review of literature". Asian Journal of Andrology. 15 (2): 221–225. doi:10.1038/aja.2012.118. PMC 3739141. PMID 23274392.
- La Vignera, S.; Condorelli, R. A.; Vicari, E.; Calogero, A. E. (3 November 2011). "Statins and Erectile Dysfunction: A Critical Summary of Current Evidence". Journal of Andrology. 33 (4): 552–558. doi:10.2164/jandrol.111.015230. PMID 22052777.
- La Vignera, S.; Condorelli, R. A.; Vicari, E.; D'Agata, R.; Calogero, A. E. (28 July 2011). "Effects of the Exposure to Mobile Phones on Male Reproduction: A Review of the Literature". Journal of Andrology. 33 (3): 350–356. doi:10.2164/jandrol.111.014373. PMID 21799142.
- La Vignera, S.; Condorelli, R. A.; Vicari, E.; Calogero, A. E. (27 January 2011). "Negative Effect of Increased Body Weight on Sperm Conventional and Nonconventional Flow Cytometric Sperm Parameters". Journal of Andrology. 33 (1): 53–58. doi:10.2164/jandrol.110.012120. PMID 21273503.

== Books and chapters ==
- La Vignera, Sandro; Condorelli, Rosita A.; Russo, Giorgio I.; Morgia, Giuseppe; Calogero, Aldo E. (2018). "The Seminal Vesicles: Endocrinological Aspects". Encyclopedia of Reproduction. pp. 355–356. doi:10.1016/B978-0-12-801238-3.64601-9. ISBN 9780128151457.
- Endocrinology of the Testis and Male Reproduction. 2016. doi:10.1007/978-3-319-29456-8. ISBN 978-3-319-29456-8.
- Antioxidants in Andrology. Trends in Andrology and Sexual Medicine. 2017. doi:10.1007/978-3-319-41749-3. ISBN 978-3-319-41747-9.
- Aversa, Antonio; Monzani, Fabio; La Vignera, Sandro (11 September 2019). "Editorial: Endocrine Frailty in the Elderly". Frontiers in Endocrinology. 10 627. doi:10.3389/fendo.2019.00627. PMC 6749013. PMID 31572305.
- "Special Issue 'Disorders of Puberty: The Causes and the Endocrine Medical Treatment'". Journal of Clinical Medicine.
