= San Nicolò l'Arena, Catania =

Catholic church in Sicily

Coordinates: 37.504245887654214°N 15.080632186294066°E

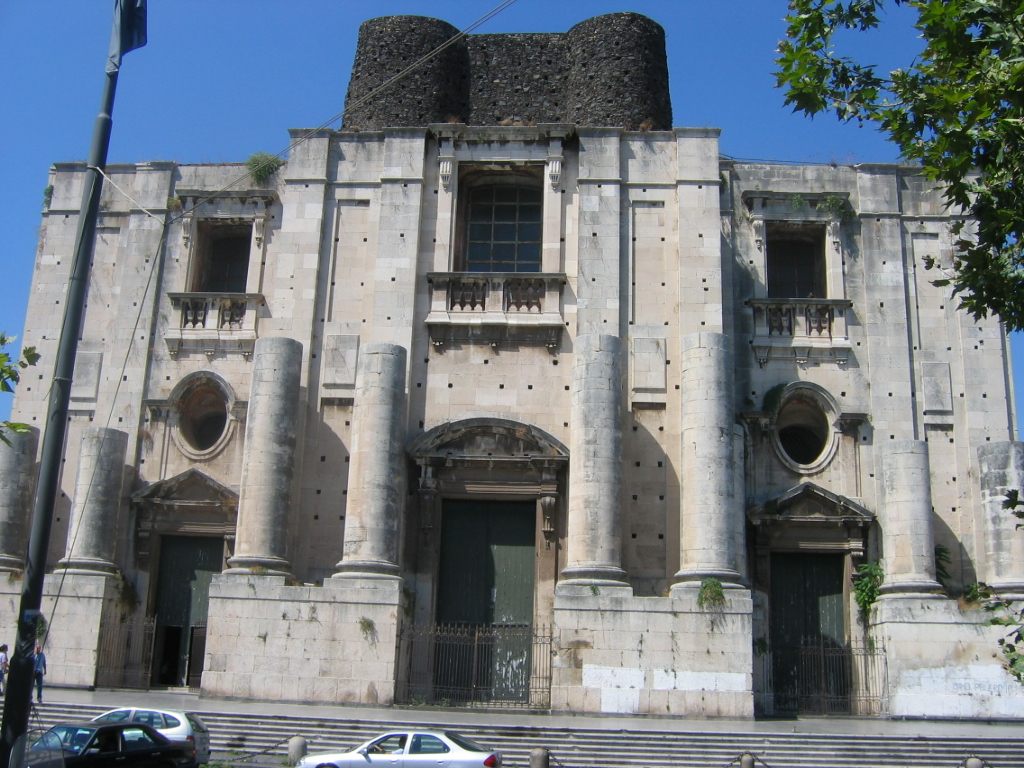
Unfinished facade of San Nicolo

San Nicolò l'Arena is the title of both the Roman Catholic church and its adjacent and enormous Benedictine monastery (Monastery of San Nicolò l'Arena) in the city of Catania, Sicily, southern Italy. The facade of the church faces Piazza Dante.

== History and description ==
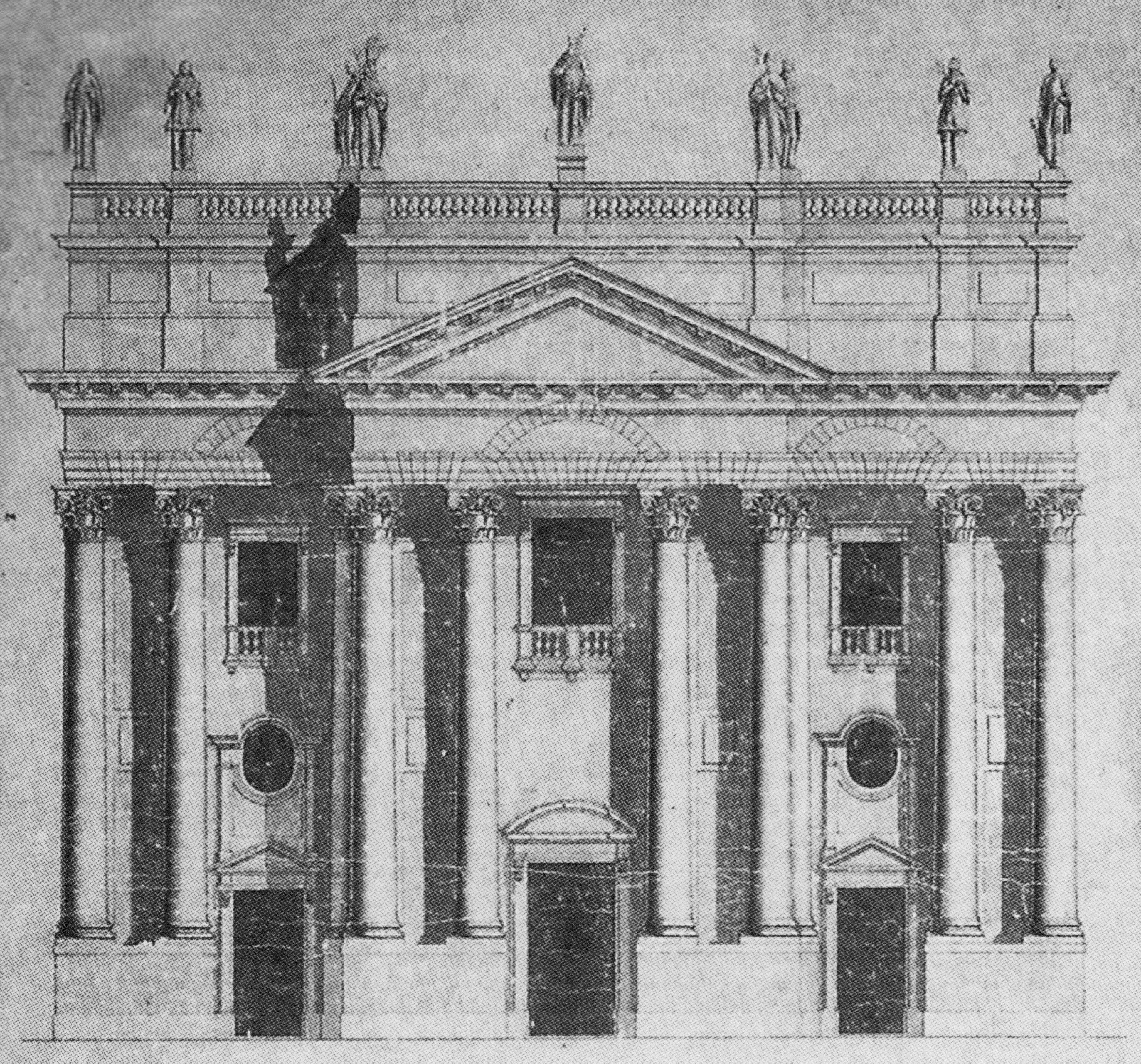
Original plan for church facade

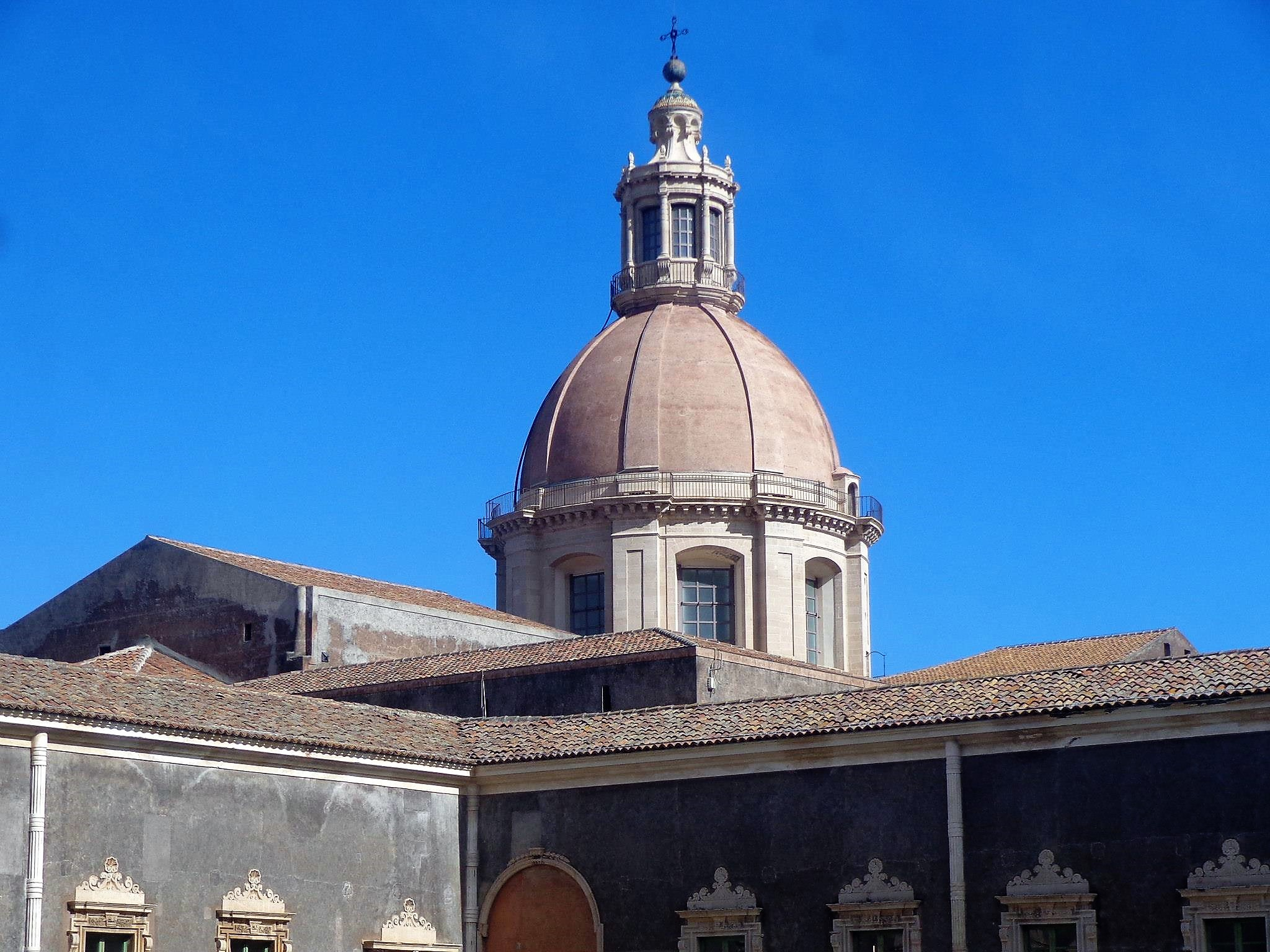
Dome of the church with viewing veranda overlooking the town

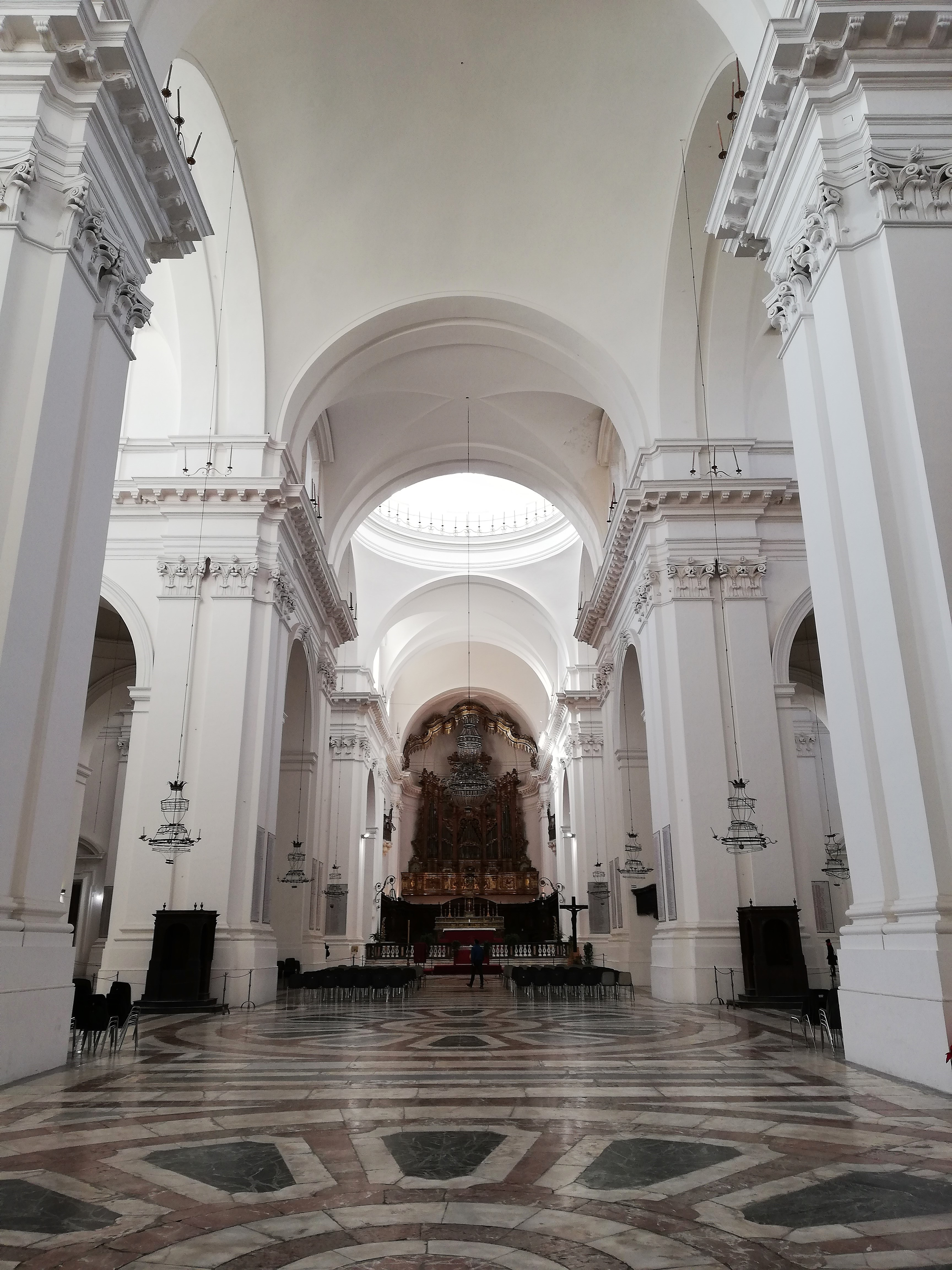
View in the nave towards the apse

The construction of this church begun in 1687, using designs of Giovanni Battista Contini, was interrupted by the profound effects of the 1693 Sicily earthquake. Reconstruction began in the 17th-century under different architects, including Francesco Battaglia and Stefano Ittar, but the facade was never finished, and presently has a surreal appearance with half-complete columns, and riddled with holes meant to hold affix marble facing. The dome was completed in 1796 by Ittar. The wide interior has massive pilasters and three naves. The main altar is surrounded by wooden choir stalls for the monks; the latter were carved by Nicolò Bagnasco. The main organ, still functioning was completed by abate Donato del Piano.

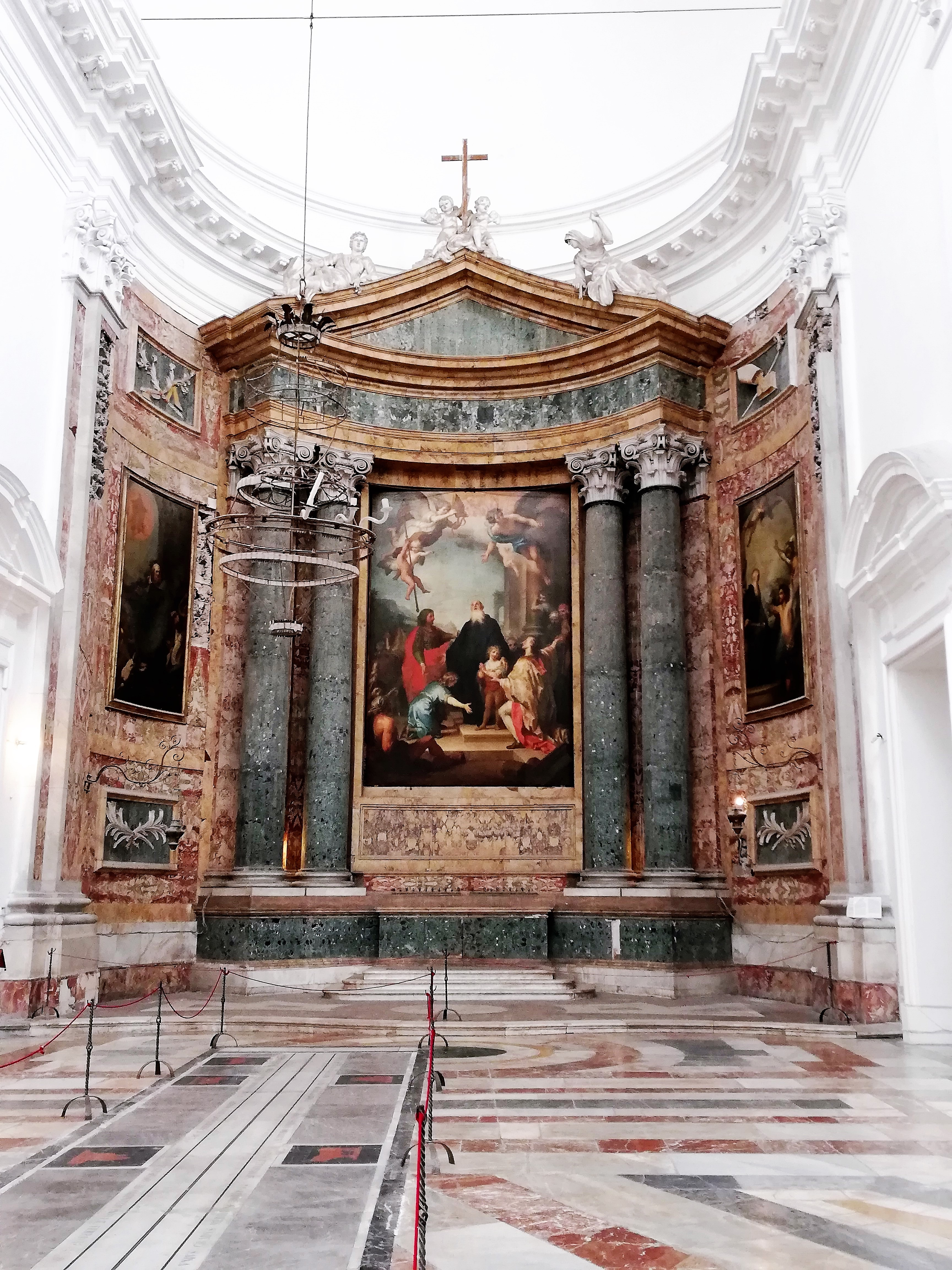
Transept altar with sundial on ground

On the church Transept floor is a sundial completed in 1841 by Wolfrang Sartorius, Baron of Waltershausen, of Göttingen, and professor Christian Peters from Flensburg.

Among the altarpieces in the church are:

- St Gregory by Vincenzo Camuccini (1st altar on right)
- St Joseph by Mariano Rossi (3rd altar on right)
- Martyrdom of Saints Placido and Flavia by Placido Campolo (right transept)
- St Benedict and Saints Placido and Mauro by Antonio Cavallucci (left transept)
- Martyrdom of Sainte Agatha by Mariano Rossi (3rd altar on left)

== See also ==
- 18th-century Western domes

== Gallery of Altarpieces ==
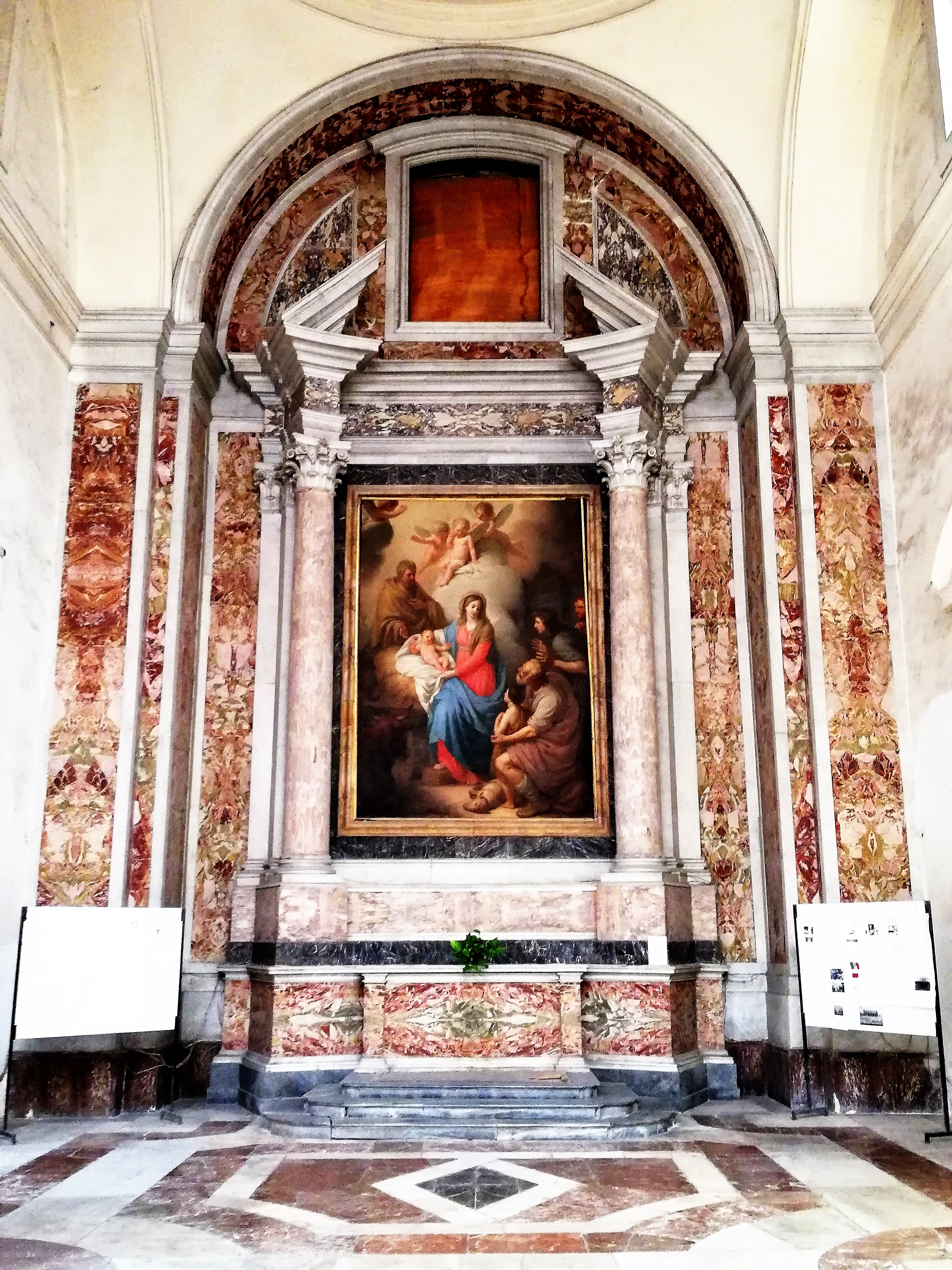
Nativity (1792) by Stefano Tofanelli

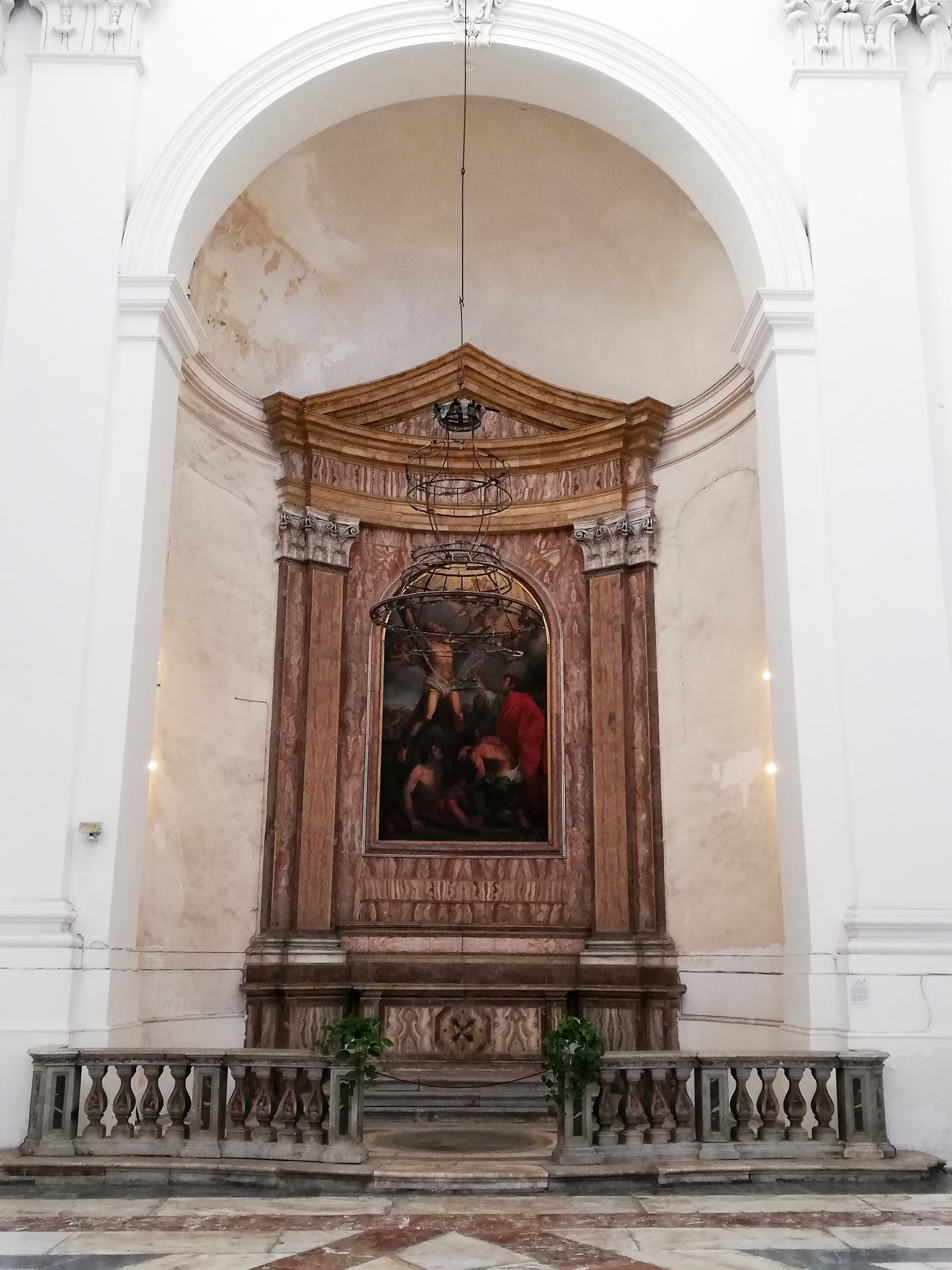
Martyrdom of St Andrew (1805) by Ferdinando Boudard

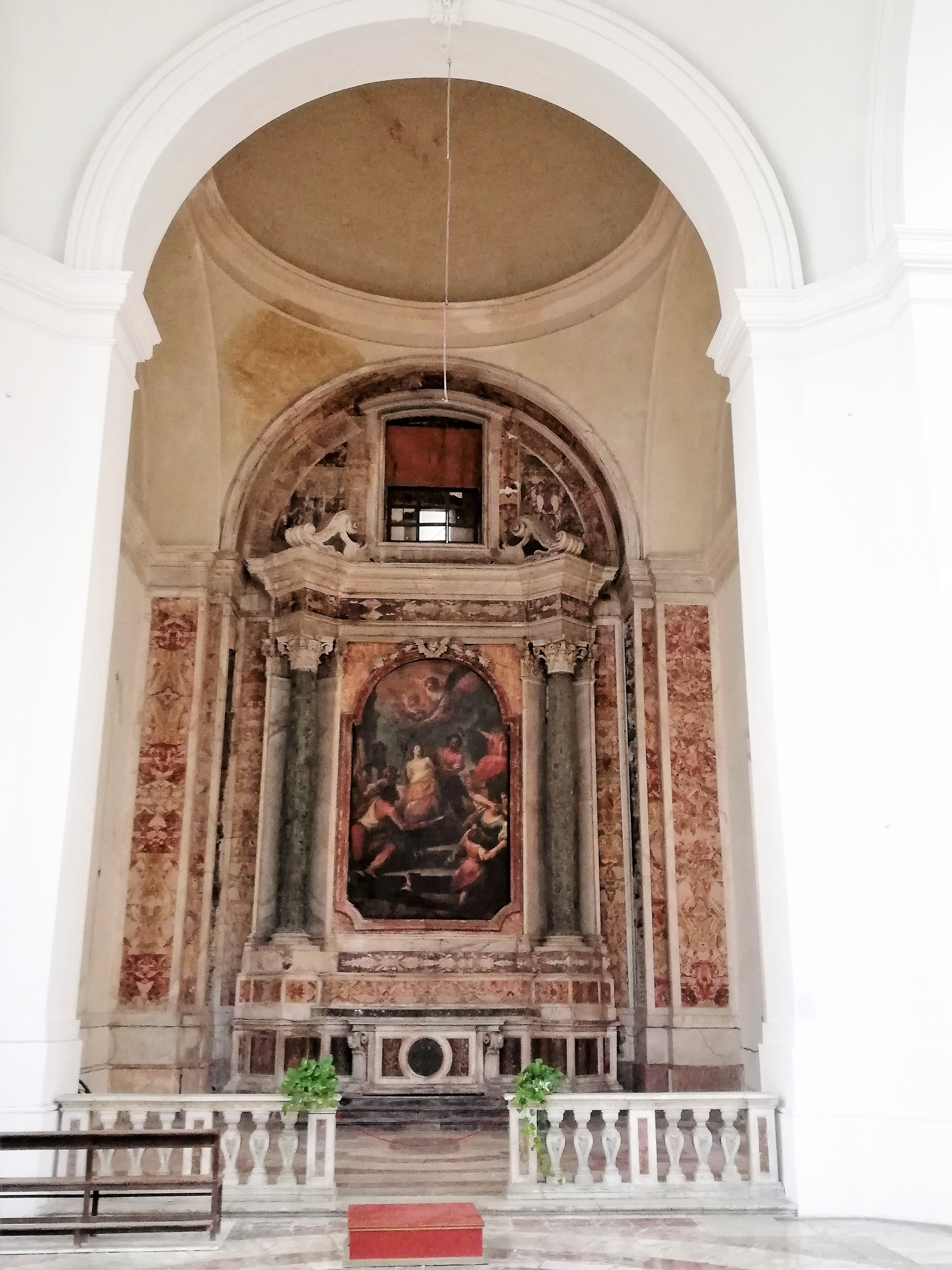
Martyrdom of St Agatha (1784) by Mariano Rossi

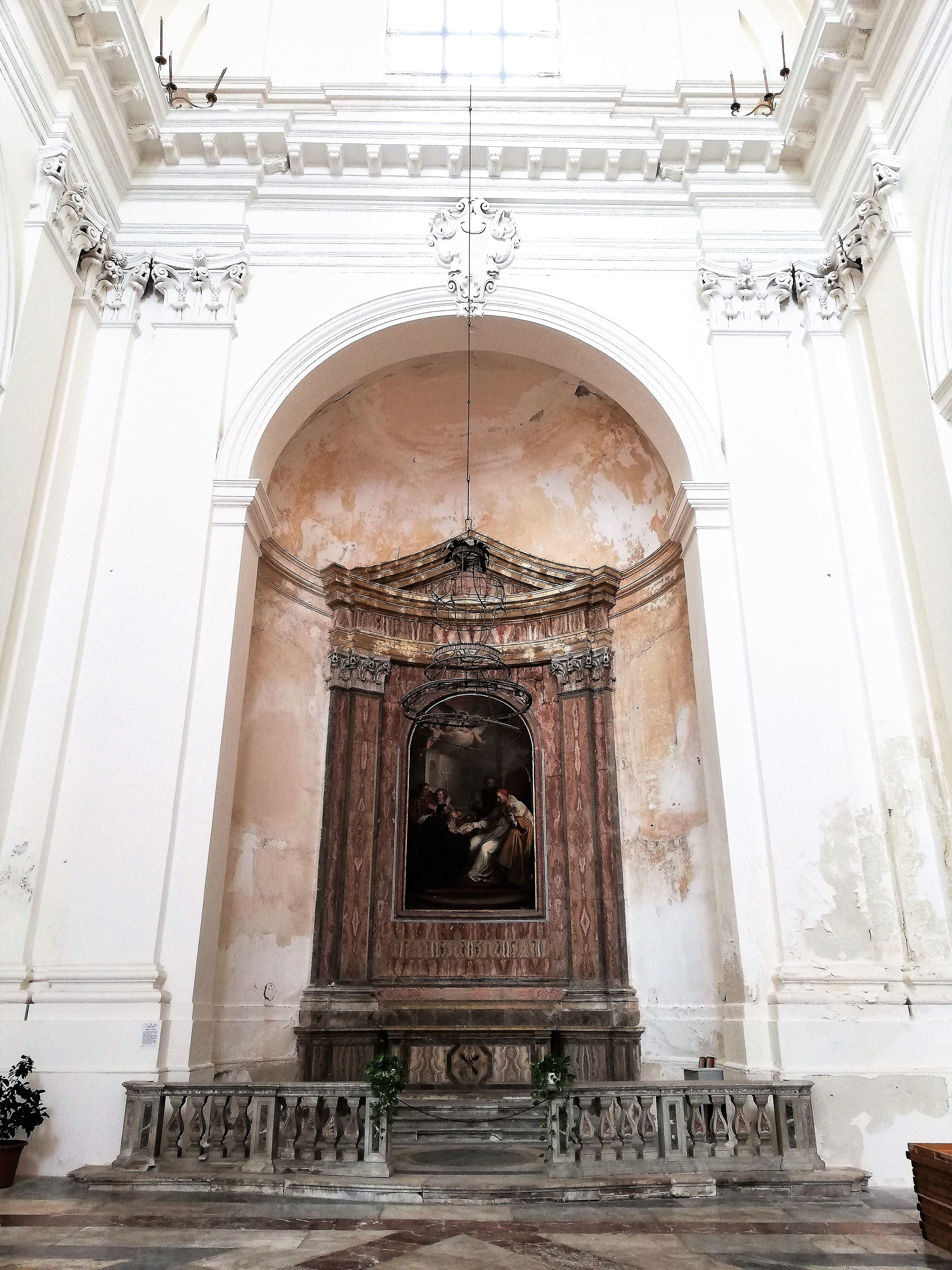
St Gregory the Great sends St Augustine to apostolize England (1829) by Vincenzo Cammuccini

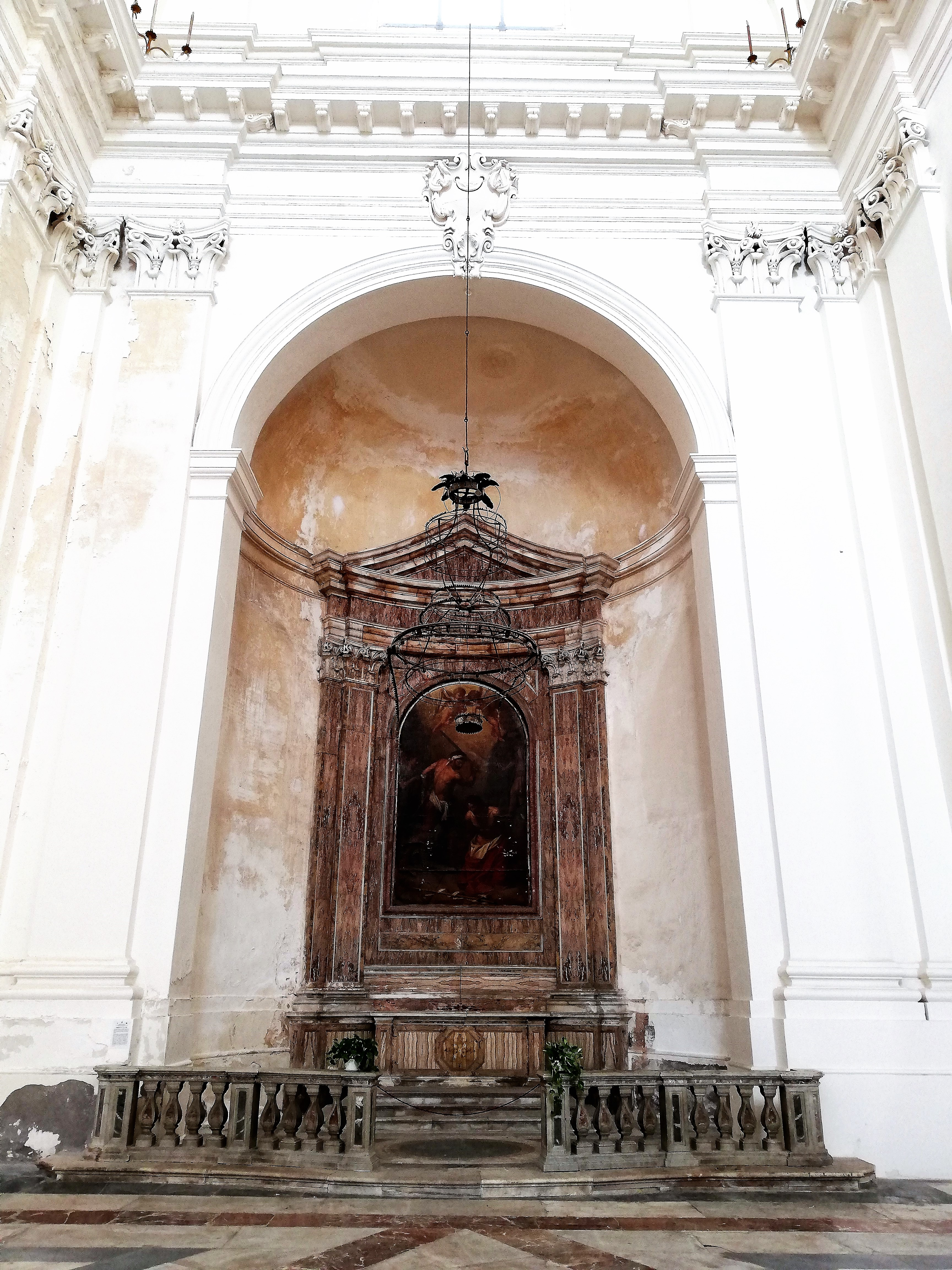
Decollation of St John the Baptist (1810) by Stefano Tofanelli
