= Salvo Baglio =

Italian academic

Salvo Baglio is a Full Professor of Electrical Instrumentation and Measurement at the University of Catania, Catania, Italy. He was named as Fellow of the Institute of Electrical and Electronics Engineers (IEEE) in 2013 for contributions to development of microsensors and magnetometers.

After receiving the “Laurea” and Ph.D. degrees from the University of Catania, Italy, in 1990 and 1994 respectively, Baglio became Full Professor at the university's faculty. A co-author of as many as 400 peer reviewed articles, Baglio serves as an associate editor of the IEEE Transaction on Circuits and Systems and the IEEE Transaction on Instrumentation.
