= San Giuseppe alla Lungara =

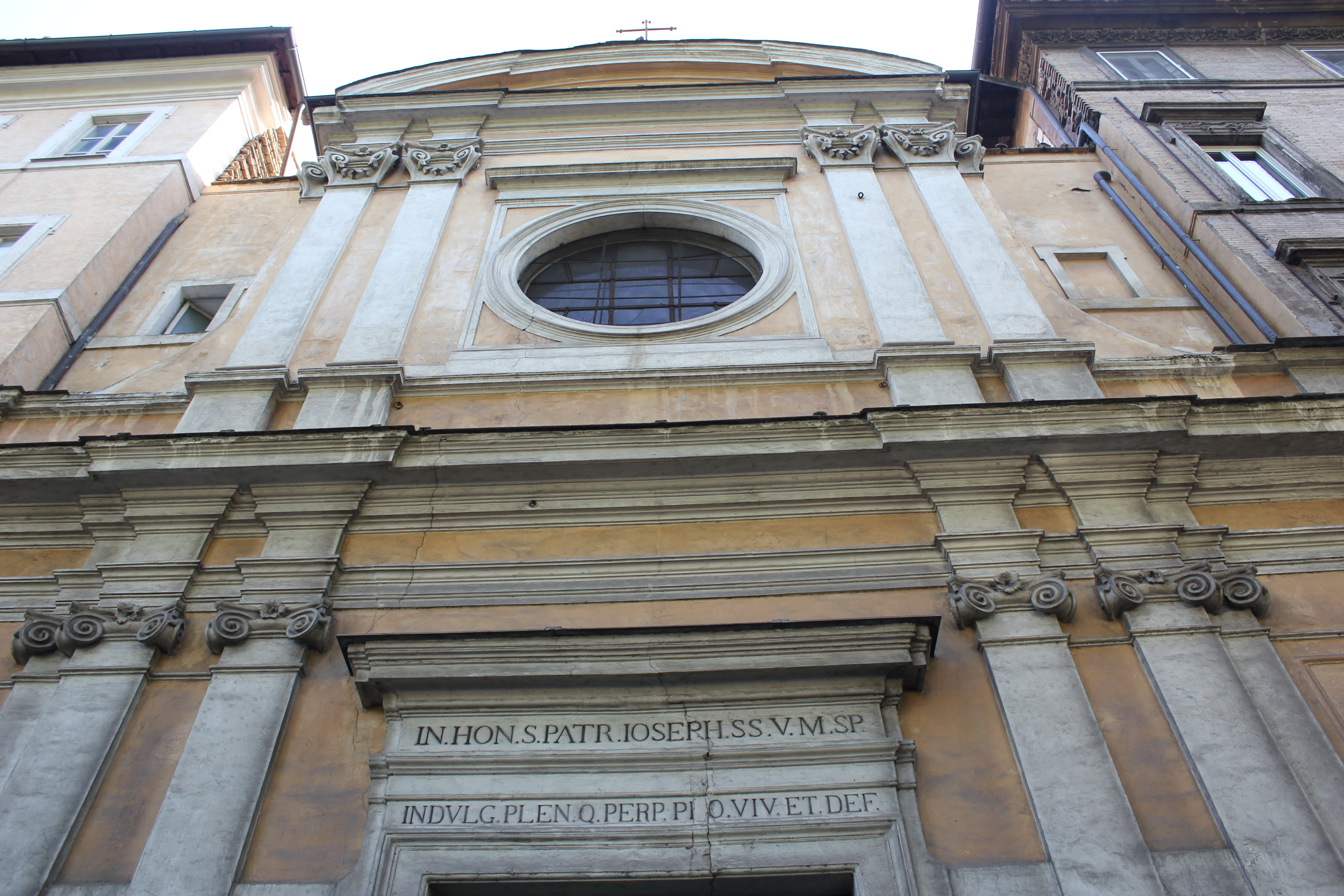
- Façade
- Click on the map for a fullscreen view
- 41°53′48.61″N 12°27′50.73″E
- Location: Rome
- Country: Italy
- Denomination: Catholic
- Tradition: Latin

History
- Founder: Pope Clement XII

Architecture
- Architect: Ludovico Rusconi Sassi
- Architectural type: Church
- Completed: 1734

Administration
- District: Lazio
- Province: Rome

San Giuseppe alla Lungara is a church of Rome (Italy), in the Rione Trastevere, facing on Via della Lungara.

It was built under the papacy of Clement XII in 1734, after a design by Ludovico Rusconi Sassi; it underwent restoration works during the 19th century, when its collapsed dome was rebuilt (1872).

== Description ==
The church shows a two-orders façade.

The interior has an octagonal plan; the high altar is dominated by the painting "The dream of St. Joseph" by Mariano Rossi. On the side walls of the little chancel there are two oil paintings within simple marble frames, both by Mariano Rossi: the one on the left shows the "Adoration of the Magi" and the one on the right the "Massacre of the innocents". The sacristy houses a marble bust portraying Pope Clement XI and a ceiling painting with the Triumph of the Church by Rossi (1768).

The cloister annexed to the church is entrusted to the Congregation of the Pii Operai Catechisti Rurali; it was built in the years between 1760 and 1764 by Giovanni Francesco Fiori and shows a beautiful façade with many decorative features. Above the main gate there is the following inscription: “D.O.M. Domum hanc Piorum Operariorum Clementis PP. XIII pietas a fundamentis erexit anno MDCCLXIII”

== Bibliography ==
- Mariano Armellini, Le chiese di Roma dal secolo IV al XIX, Rome 1891
- C. Rendina, Le Chiese di Roma, Newton & Compton Editori, Milan 2000, p. 152
- G. Carpaneto, Rione XIII Trastevere, in AA.VV, I rioni di Roma, Newton & Compton Editori, Milan 2000, Vol. III, pp. 831–923
- D. Vizzari, La chiesa di San Giuseppe alla Lungara, Ardor, Rome 1986.
