= Raoul Vecchio =

Raoul Vecchio is an Italian architect and activist, best known as the founder of humanitarian organization Balouo Salo.

== Early life ==
Raoul Vecchio was born in 1985 in Catania, and was educated as an engineer and architect from the University of Catania from 2007 to 2013.

== Career ==
In 2014 Raoul Vecchio founded Balouo Salo. The first project that he produced through the organization was a bridge-dam over the Casamance River to provide desalination of water leaching into the freshwater of the river. Vecchio has also run local workshops in places such as Senegal to assemble local to craft and donate household items to the local community such as desks and chairs. In 2023 he helped to create the Multipurpose Cultural Center and Museum of Traditions in Tanaff, Senegal. Designboom commented that the site was created “utilizing the ‘Earthbags’ technique—employing locally sourced, earth-filled bags compacted and finished with natural materials like raw earth and straw,” in an effort to highlight sustainability. The organization trained local residents to help in its construction.

Vecchio also created and runs the Kaira Looro international architecture competition, with annual categories including the development of more sustainable maternity wards, drinking wells, community centres, and peace pavilion design. Vecchio published the book, La felicità nel sorriso altrui (“Happiness in the Smile of Others”) in 2017, which focuses on the work of the Balouo Salo, with the proceeds being returned to the firm. The La Sicilia newspaper wrote of the book that it "reveals the most intimate aspects of his bond [with Africa] and lays bare his emotions." Vecchio has also held art exhibitions at institutions such as the Palazzo della Cultura in Catania in support of Senegalese infrastructure improvement projects.
