= Vincenzo Ortoleva =

Italian classical philologist (born 1965)

Vincenzo Ortoleva (23 May 1965, Catania, Italy) is an Italian classical philologist.

Ortoleva studied from 1983 to 1988 Classical Philology at University of Catania. In 1996 he took his PhD with the dissertation "La tradizione manoscritta della Mulomedicina di Publio Vegezio Renato". Habilitated to University teaching in 2003, he became Full Professor of Classical Philology at University of Catania in 2005. His particular fields of research are Greek and Latin technical literature, text tradition, textual criticism and history of classical scholarship. He has also discovered several manuscripts of Greek and Latin authors: for instance an anonymous Greek translation of the Disticha Catonis in the Cod. Monacensis Gr. 551 and unpublished fragments of the Latin writer Pelagonius in Cod. Verona, Biblioteca civica, 658.

== Main publications ==
=== Monographs ===
- Maximus Planudes (1992). Ortoleva, V. (ed.). Disticha Catonis in Graecum translata. Roma: Edizioni dell'Ateneo. ISBN 88-84-76060-7.
- Ortoleva, V. (1996). La tradizione manoscritta della "Mulomedicina" di Publio Vegezio Renato. Acireale: Editrice Sileno.
- Publius Vegetius Renatus (1999). Ortoleva, V. (ed.). Digesta artis mulomedicinalis. Liber primus. Catania: Dipartimento di Studi antichi e tardoantichi.
- Ortoleva, V. (2023). Scritti di Filologia greca e latina. Biblioteca di «Commentaria Classica», 3. Vol. I. Catania: Litterae Press. ISBN 978-88-945431-6-2. (Kleine Schriften)
- Ortoleva, V. (2023). Scritti di Filologia greca e latina. Biblioteca di «Commentaria Classica», 4. Vol. II. Catania: Litterae Press. ISBN 978-88-945431-7-9. (Kleine Schriften)

=== Articles ===
- Ortoleva, V. (1990). "A proposito di alcuni autografi scaligerani: Giuseppe Scaligero editore e traduttore dei Disticha Catonis". Siculorum Gymnasium. 43: 277–285. ISSN 0037-458X.
- Ortoleva, V. (1990). "Una traduzione greca inedita dei Disticha Catonis". Sileno. 16: 287–300.
- Ortoleva, V. (1992). "Glosse in καθαρεύουσα alla traduzione planudea dei Disticha Catonis" (PDF). Eikasmos. 2: 265–276.
- Ortoleva, V. (1994). "La cosiddetta tradizione "epitomata" della Mulomedicina di Vegezio: recensio deterior o tradizione indiretta?". Revue d'Histoire des Textes. 24: 251–274.
- Ortoleva, V. (1994). "Note critiche al De genio Socratis di Plutarco (I)". Sileno. 20: 375–393.
- Ortoleva, V. (1995). "La parafrasi della traduzione planudea dei Disticha Catonis nel cod. Barocc. 71". Byzantion. 55: 89–97. ISSN 0378-2506.
- Ortoleva, V. (1995). "Note critiche al De genio Socratis di Plutarco (II)". Sileno. 21: 201–220.
- Ortoleva, V. (1998). "Un nuovo testimone frammentario di Pelagonio e alcune considerazioni sulla tradizione manoscritta e sul testo dell'Ars ueterinaria". Res Publica Litterarum. 21: 13–44. ISSN 1123-3990.
- Ortoleva, V. (2000). "Note critico-testuali ed esegetiche al primo libro dei Digesta artis mulomedicinalis di Vegezio". Wiener Studien. 113: 245–280. ISSN 0084-005X.
- Ortoleva, V. (2001). "La terminologia greco-latina per designare le andature del cavallo (con un'appendice sull'etimologia dell'italiano danzare)". Indogermanische Forschungen. 106: 126–163. ISSN 0019-7262.
- Ortoleva, V. (2002). "I termini 'strem(m)a' e 'semis' nella Mulomedicina Chironis e in Vegezio". Latomus. 61: 415–437. ISSN 0023-8856.
- Ortoleva, V. (2004). "Tre note al testo dell'Epitoma rei militaris di Vegezio (ovvero i limiti della filologia classica)". Philologus. 148: 143–167. ISSN 0031-7985.
- Ortoleva, V. (2006). "A proposito di una recente edizione dell'Epitoma rei militaris di Vegezio". Emerita. 74: 47–75.
- Ortoleva, V. (2006). "Ancora sul latino saliuatum, saliuare". Hermes. 134: 352–366. ISSN 0018-0777.
- Ortoleva, V. (2007). "Catullo 107.7-8" (PDF). Sileno. 33: 139–149.
- (Ortoleva, V. (2007). "Veg. Mil. 1,5,3–4". Museum Helveticum. 64: 122–124. ISSN 0027-4054.
- Ortoleva, V. (2008). "L'opera del veterinario in Edict. Diocl. 7, 20–21" (PDF). Rheinisches Museum für Philologie. 151: 357–364. ISSN 0035-449X.
- Ortoleva, V. (2009). "Alcuni aspetti della lingua dei trattati latini di veterinaria: il sostantivo claucus e l'espressione pedem planum ponere" (PDF). In Ortoleva, V.; Petringa, M. R. (eds.). La veterinaria antica e medievale (testi greci, latini, arabi e romanzi). Atti del II Convegno internazionale, Catania 3–5 ottobre 2007. Lugano: Athenaion. pp. 153–181.
- Lat. tripedica., in Indogermanische Forschungen, ISSN 0019-7262, 114, 2009, 240–256. (Vincenzo Ortoleva at Google Books).
- Max Ihm e Eugen Oder. A proposito di alcuni autografi recentemente scoperti, in Philologia antiqua, ISSN 1971-9078, 5, 2012, pp. 49–84.
- Palladio 3,30: un autentico caso di nominatiuus pendens?, in: Latin vulgaire - Latin tardif, IXe Colloque international 2-6 septembre 2009, Université Lumière Lyon 2, ISBN 9782356680303, Lyon 2012, pp. 235–252.
- Lat. Taurura e Gregorio di Nazianzo De uita sua 126, in Rivista di Filologia e di Istruzione classica, ISSN 0035-6220, 141/1, 2013, pp. 123–136.
- The meaning and etymology of the adjective apiosus, in B. Maire (ed.), ‘Greek’ and ‘Roman’ in Latin Medical Texts, Studies in Cultural Change and Exchange in Ancient Medicine, ISBN 9789004242784, Leiden 2014, pp. 257–288.
- La congiunzione nē nel latino tardo (a proposito di Veg. mil. 4,41,4), in Latin Vulgaire Latin Tardif X - Actes du Xe colloque international sur le latin vulgaire et tardif, Bergamo, 5-9 septembre 2012, Bergamo 2014, ISBN 9788866421603, pp. 323–342.
- Un frammento inedito di un non identificato trattato di medicina tardolatino, in Revue d'Histoire des Textes ISSN 0373-6075, n. s. 10, 2015, pp. 197–214.
- Le Pelagonianae emendationes: un inedito di Christian Theophil Schuch. Contributo alla critica del testo dell’Ars ueterinaria, in Eikasmós ISSN 1121-8819, 26, 2015, pp. 343–368.
