= Catania Astrophysical Observatory =

Observatory in Italy

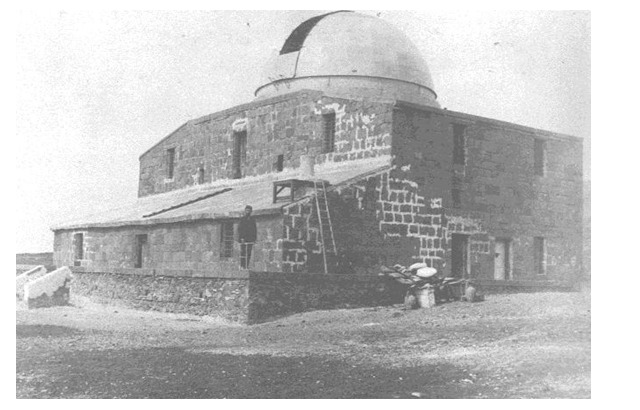
- Alternative names: INAF Catania Astrophysical Observatory
- Organization: University of Catania, Istituto Nazionale di Astrofisica
- Location: Catania, Sicily, Italy
- Coordinates: 37°31′43.71″N 15°4′17.38″E
- Website: woac.ct.astro.it
- Telescopes: Catania Astrophysical Observatory "A. Riccò"; Serra La Nave observatory
- Related media on Commons

The Catania Observatory (Italian: Osservatorio Astrofisico di Catania) is an astronomical observatory in the city of Catania, on the island of Sicily in southern Italy. It is operated by INAF, the National Institute for Astrophysics.

== See also ==
- List of astronomical observatories
