= Monastery of San Nicolò l'Arena =

Benedictine monastery in Sicily

Coordinates: 37.5042°N 15.0797°E

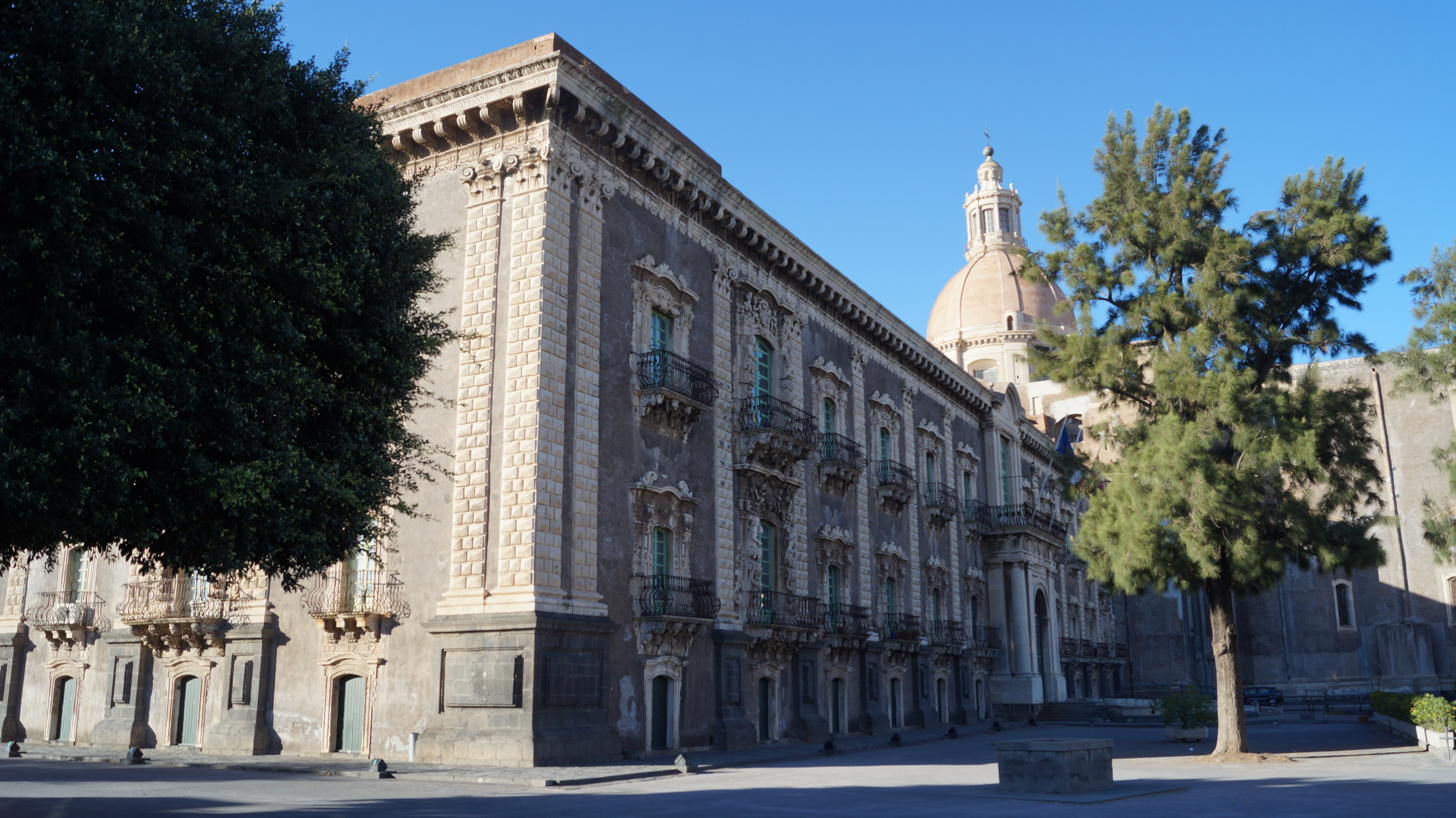
Façade of the Monastery of San Nicolò l'Arena.

The Monastery of San Nicolò l'Arena in Catania, Sicily, is a former Benedictine monastery located at Piazza Dante 30. Together with the Palace of Mafra, it ranks among the largest Benedictine monasteries in Europe. Now part of the late Baroque ensemble of the Val di Noto, it houses the Department of Humanities of the University of Catania.

== History and description ==
The monastery was founded in 1558. Dedicated to San Nicola di Bari, the suffix of Arena (sand) derived from the volcanic sand present in the area.

The monastery complex is located in the historical centre of the city of Catania, alongside the church of San Nicolò l'Arena. The structure integrates architectural styles from various centuries. Although founded in the 16th century, two natural disasters in the 17th century required major reconstruction. The 1669 Etna eruption surrounded the city of Catania with lava, widening the coast for more than 1 km, and the lands of the monastery too. While the monastery was not destroyed by the lava, the surrounding acquired a level of lava stone 12 meters high. The 1693 Sicily earthquake, also called the Val di Noto earthquake, and the following tsunami ravaged the entire east coast of Sicily and Catania. Like nearly the entire city, the monastery was nearly razed and only the basement floors survived.

In 1702 the rebuilding started and lasted until 1866, when the new Kingdom of Italy confiscated the monastery. The present monastery was rebuilt atop the original structure, with an added new cloister (the eastern cloister) and a new area (the large part designed by Giovanni Battista Vaccarini) on the top of the lava bench.

In 1977 the monastery was donated to the University of Catania, which restored the entire structure; in 1984 Giancarlo De Carlo started to design the entire restoration work.

== Gallery ==
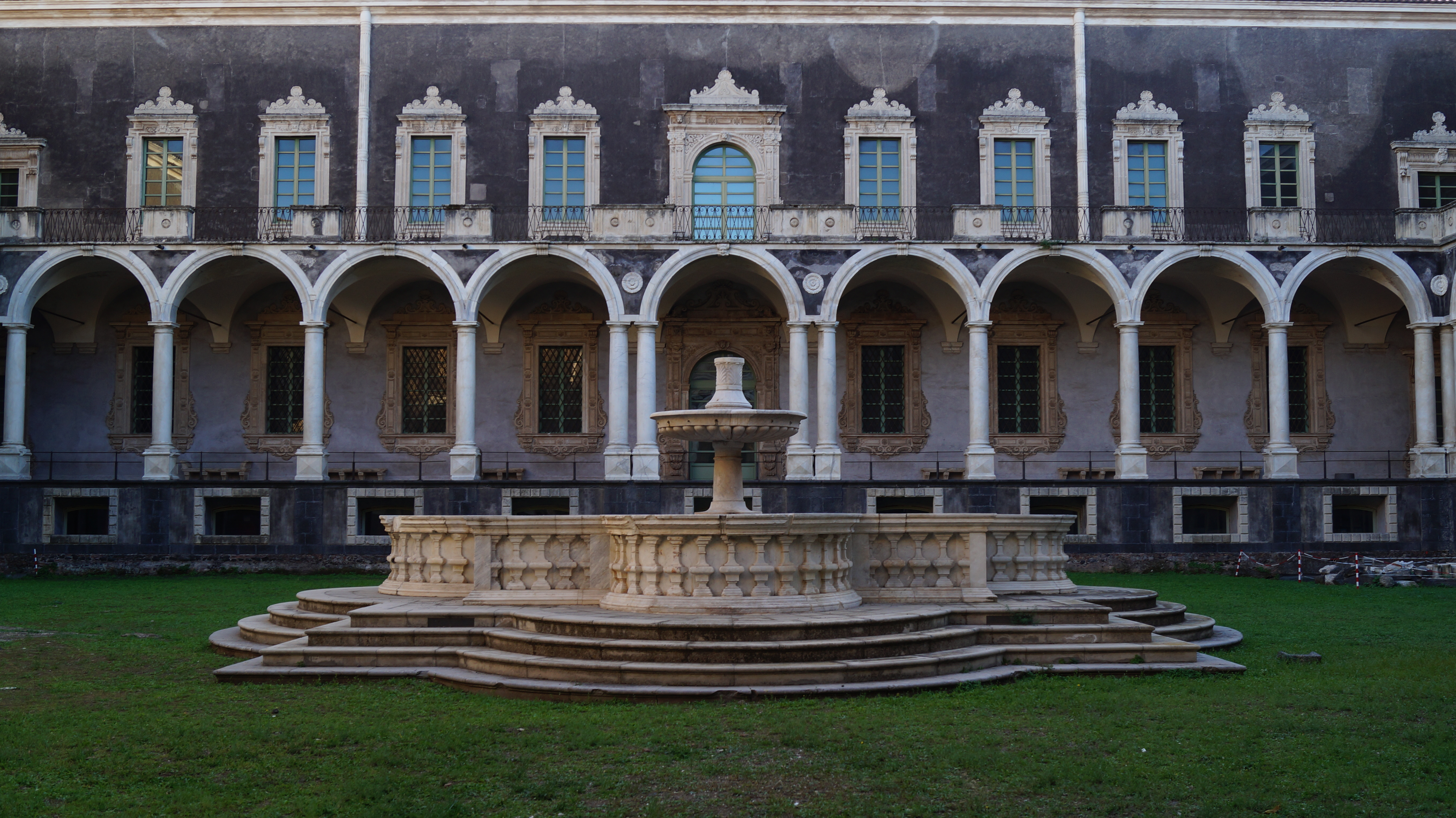
The Marble Cloister, reflecting the original square plan of the monastery founded in 1558.

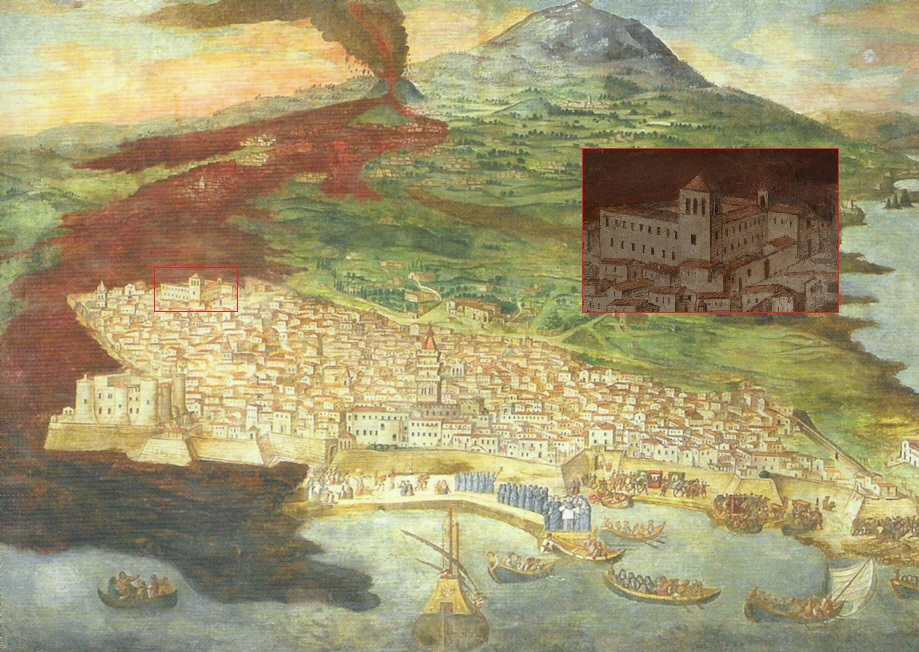
Fresco by Giacinto Platania depicting the 1669 eruption of Mount Etna, with Catania and the monastery surrounded by lava.

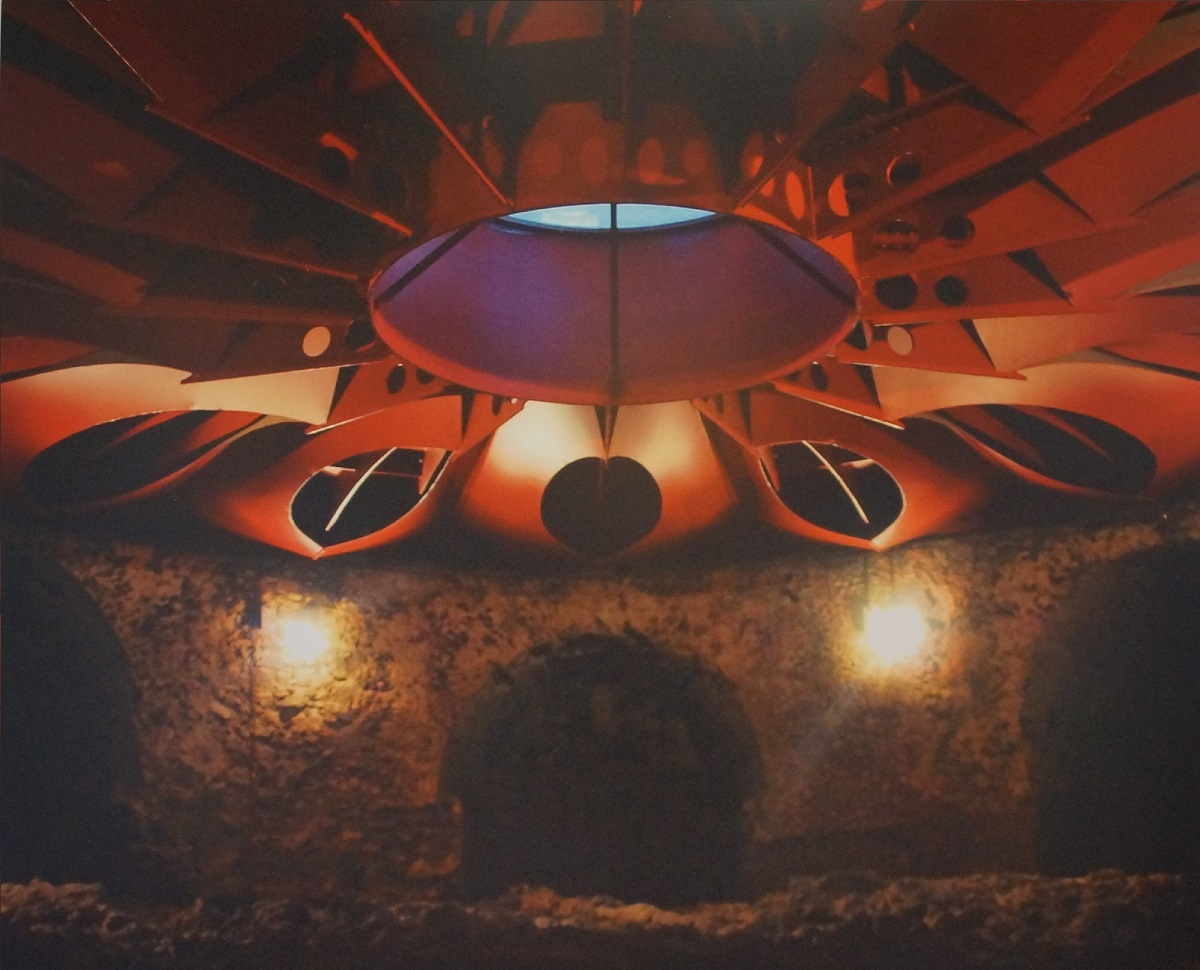
"Red Hall" - Antonino Leonardi
