= Mariano Rossi =

Italian painter (1731–1807)

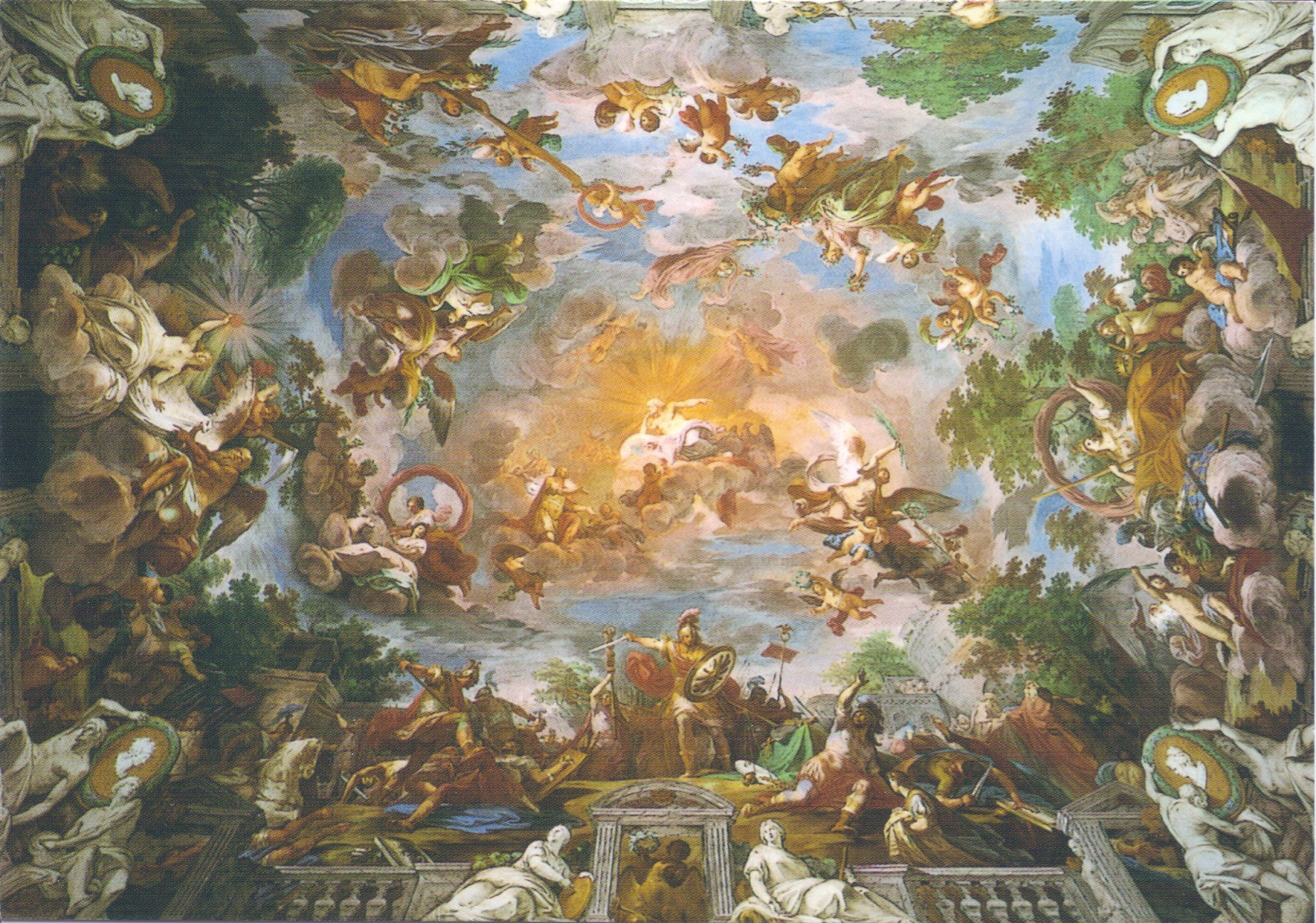
Ceiling fresco depicting Camillus in battle while Romulus pleads with Jove, located in room of Villa Borghese

Mariano Rossi (7 December 1731 - 24 October 1807) was an Italian painter, persisting in what had become an anachronistic Rococo style amid an ascendant neoclassical environment. His placement legions of figures in a complex scenography and quadrature recalls the work of Pietro da Cortona.

== Biography ==
Mariano was born to poor parents in Sciacca, Sicily. He trained first in Palermo, then in Naples, and finally in Rome, where he studied under Marco Benefial. He was patronized by the illuminated charity of men of fashion (that is, wealthy individuals)

He was paid 400 zecchini by the Cardinal Cardinal Bernis for a canvas depicting Joshua commanding Sun to stand still. He painted for the churches of Purgatorio and Santa Lucia in Sciacca, Sicily. In 1766, he was called to paint frescoes for the royal court in Turin.

He then returned to Rome, where he painted a fresco in the grand salon of the Villa Borghese. During 1775-1779, he painted a large ceiling fresco depicting Marcus Furius Camillus Fighting Brennus and his Gauls, while Romulus Entreats Jupiter to Help Rome. The room displays some of the ancient Roman statuary, previously collected by Camillo Borghese. Other contemporary painters active in the Villa were Laurent Pecheux and Domenico de Angelis. Mariano joined the Academy of St Luke in 1776.

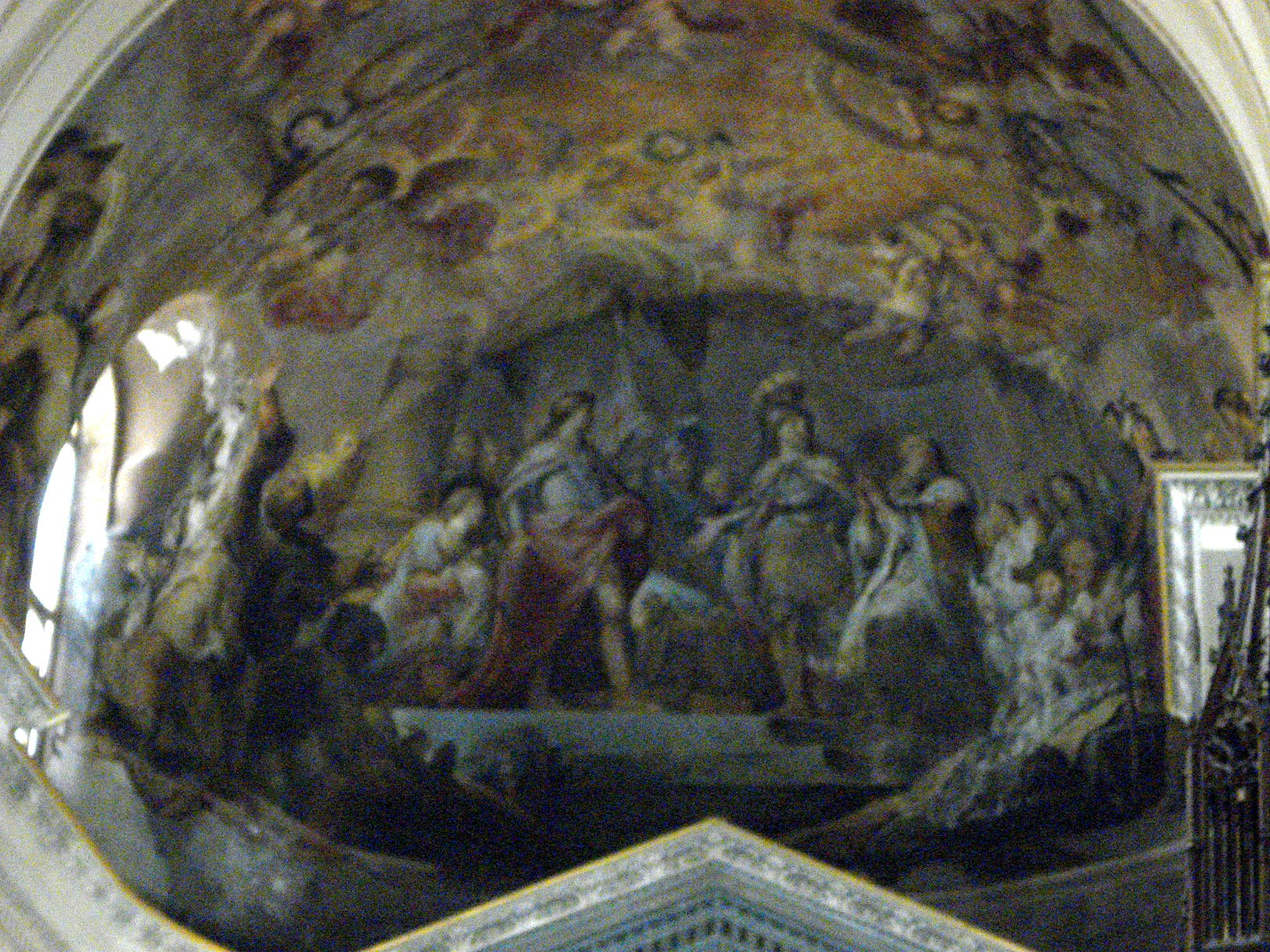
Cupola of Palermo Cathedral

Moving to Campania, he painted a Marriage of Alexander the Great to Roxana. He painted a Ovid writing Ars Amatoria for Paul I, Tsar of Russia.

The Napoleonic invasion of Rome caused him to leave for Sicily. There he painted a Roger I Liberating of Sicily from the Saracens for the Palermo Cathedral. With the Bourbon restoration in Naples, he briefly painted again at the Palace of Caserta. But moving back to Rome in 1804, he died. He was buried in the church of Santa Susanna, Rome.

== Other works ==
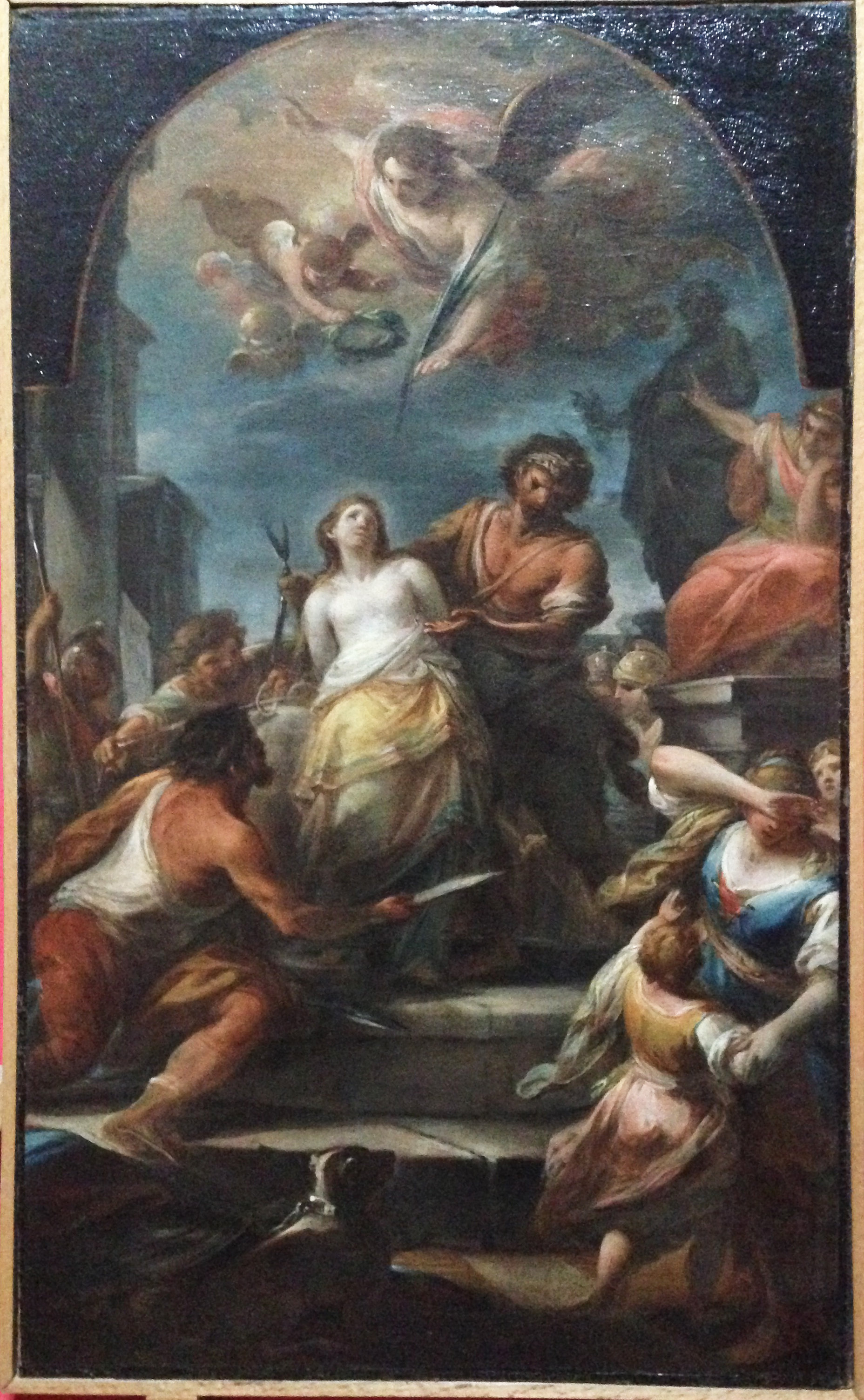
Martyrdom of St Agatha, Catania

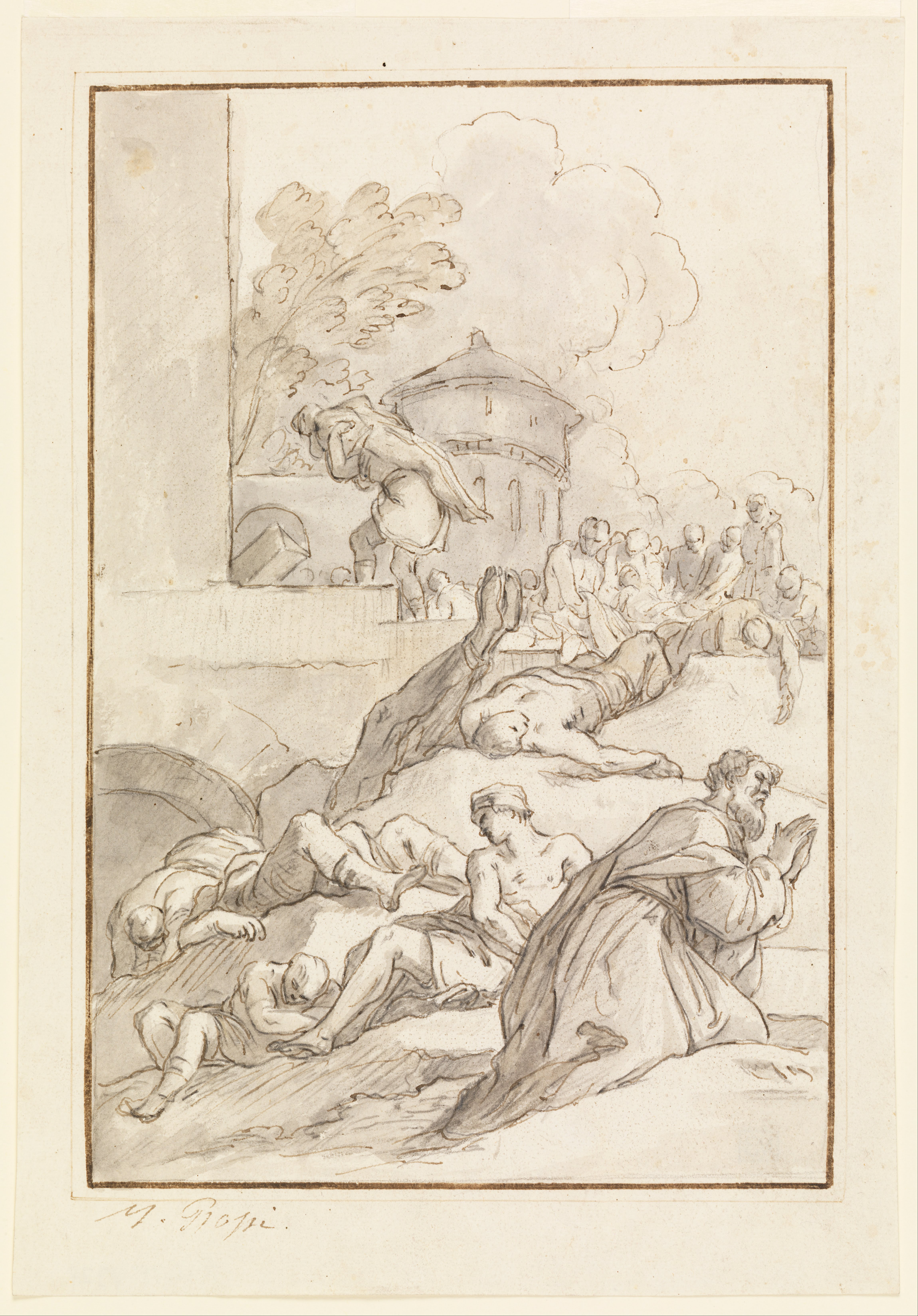
Study for Saint during a Plague

Works by Rossi were made for:

- Pope Honorius for the Santa Maria in Ara Coeli, Rome
- Paintings in San Giuseppe alla Lungara, Rome
- Adoration of the Magi and Conversation of Peter and Paul Galleria Nazionale d'Arte Antica, Palazzo Barberini, Rome
- Duomo of Palermo
- San Benedetto, Palermo
- San Martino for PP. Cassinesi, Palermo
- Sant'Agata, Catania
- Family of Darius before Alexander, Cleopatra, and a Holy Family for Marchese San Giacomo, Sciacca
- Sacrifice of Abraham, Agar and Ishmael, Moses, and a Deposition for Baron Consiglio, Sciacca
- Landscape with Agar, Joshua, and Alexander for Signor Rosa, Sciacca
- Alexander the Great's marriage with Roxana, Royal Palace of Caserta, Caserta

== Sources ==
- Nuova enciclopedia italiana, 6th Edition by Gerolamo Boccardo (1885), page 721. quoting

Giuseppe Vento, Elogio biografico di Mariano Bossi (Palermo 1864).
