= Piazza Dante, Catania =

Coordinates: 37°30′26.8″N 15°5′9.3″E

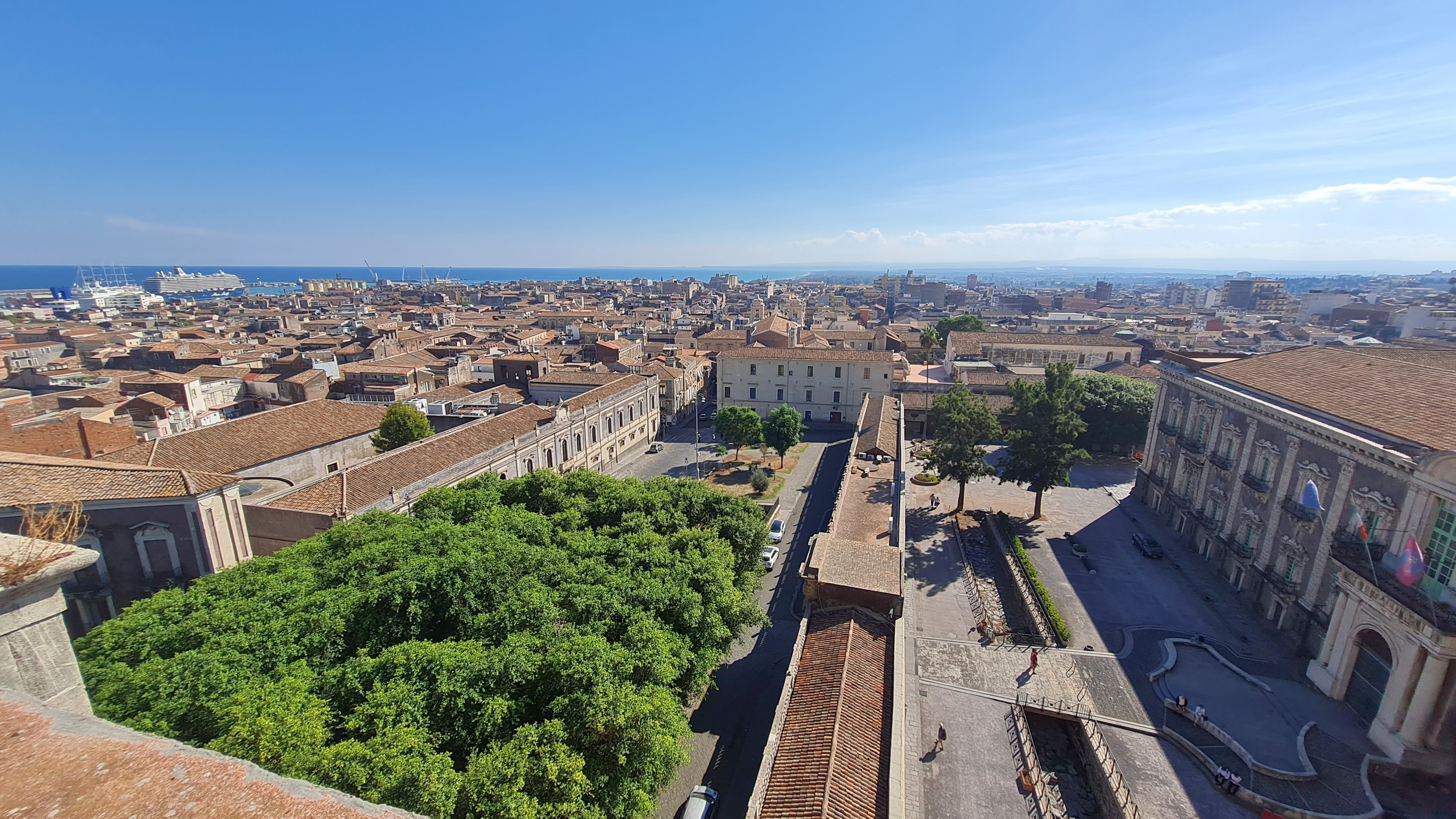
A high view of Piazza Dante in Catania.

Piazza Dante is a piazza located in the city centre of Catania, Sicily, Italy.

The square faces the façade of the unfinished San Nicolò l'Arena church. Behind and to the sides of the church stands the vast former Monastery of San Nicolò l'Arena, which today houses the humanities department and the library of the University of Catania.

Flanking the semicircular layout of the piazza are two rectangular extensions. The southern extension contains ruins of the ancient Roman baths that once formed part of the town's former Acropolis. The buildings surrounding the semicircle, though weathered with age, exhibit a consistent baroque architectural style, indicating that they were likely conceived as part of an 18th-century urban plan developed during the city's reconstruction following the 1693 Sicily earthquake.
