= University of Catania =

Public university in Catania, Italy

Coordinates: 37°30′13″N 15°05′12″E

- Università degli Studi di Catania
- Latin: Siciliae Studium Generale
- Type: Public
- Established: 19 October 1434; 592 years ago
- Affiliations: UNIMED
- Rector: Prof. Enrico Foti
- Academic staff: 2,211 (2024/2025)
- Administrative staff: 1,150 (2024/2025)
- Students: 40,287 (2024/2025)
- Location: Catania, Italy
- Sports teams: CUS Catania
- Website: www.unict.it/

The University of Catania (Italian: Università degli Studi di Catania) is a university located in Catania, Sicily. Founded in 1434, it is the oldest university in Sicily, the 13th oldest in Italy, and the 29th oldest in the world. With over 40,000 enrolled students, it is the largest university in Sicily.

== History ==
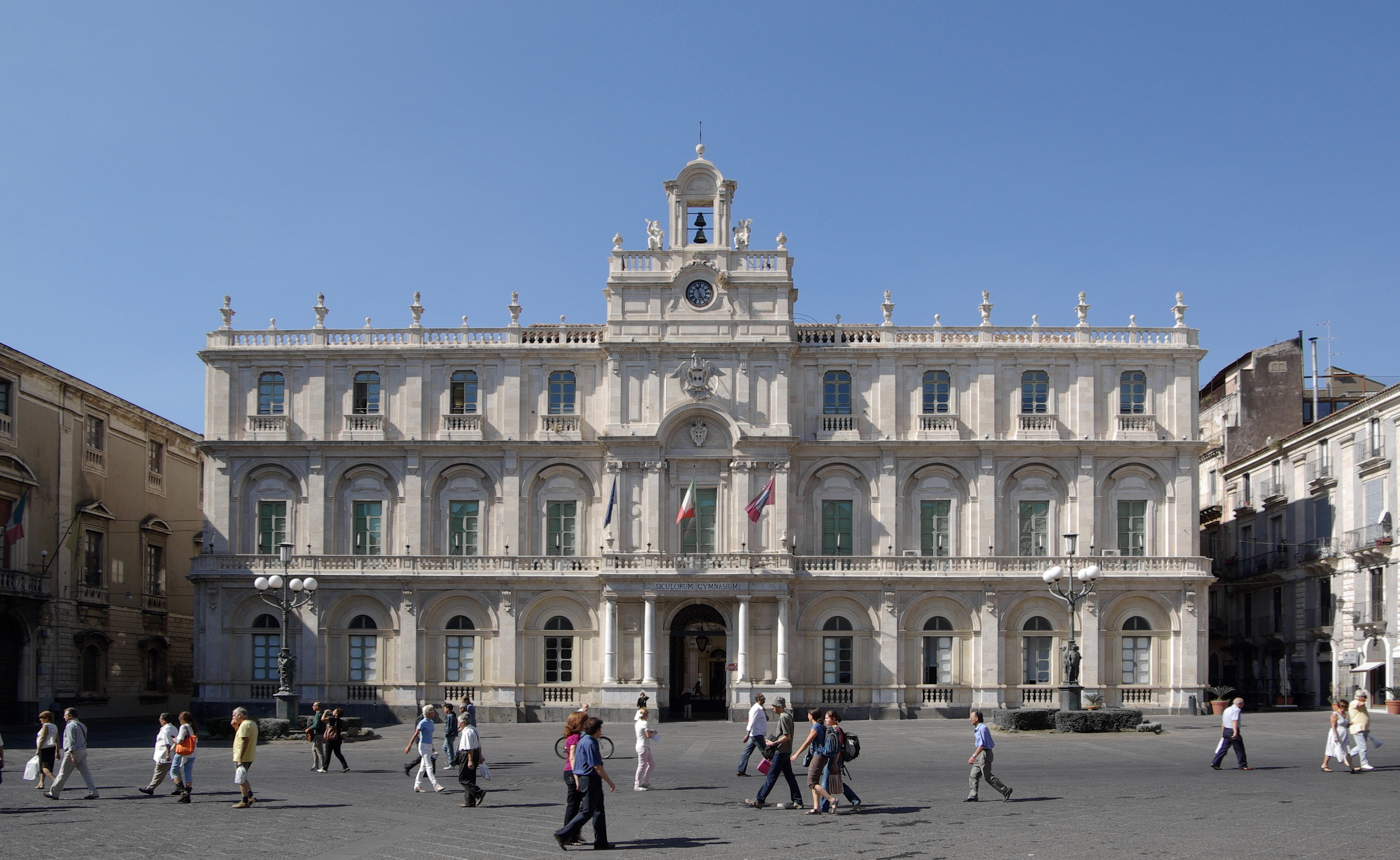
The Palazzo dell'Università, seat of the University.

The University of Catania was founded on 19 October 1434 by King Alfonso I of Sicily. The royal charter was issued after two royal councillors, Adamo Asmundo and Battista Platamone, persuaded the king to establish a Studium Generale in Catania. The foundation was intended, in part, to compensate Catania for the transfer of Sicily’s capital from the city to Palermo. A papal sanction was required to grant the Studium Generale ecclesiastical recognition and the academic privileges associated with this status: on 18 April 1444 Pope Eugene IV issued the bull Dum intra pectoris formally recognising the University.

On 18 October 1445, Pietro Geremia delivered the inaugural lecture, De laude scientiarum, marking the beginning of academic activities. Initially there were only six professors and ten students. The first four faculties were Medicine, Philosophy, Canon and Civil Law and Theology. Lessons were initially held in a building in Piazza del Duomo, next to the Cathedral of Sant'Agata, and eventually moved to the Palazzo dell'Università in the late 1690s. This building remains the office of the rector of the university to this day.

During the course of the 16th century, approximately 20-25 degrees were awarded each year. The university (which from the 16th century was referred to as Siculorum Gymnasium) was named Studium Generale because it was the only entity that could release degrees equal to those released in the old Studia of Salamanca, Valladolid, Bologna and this contributed to spread envy in the other Sicilian cities, mainly Palermo and Messina.

In the early centuries of its existence, the university was administered by the Senate of Catania, overseen by the Viceroy of Sicily, with the bishop of Catania being ex officio Great Chanchellor. With a reform operated by the Viceroy in 1679 the authority of the Bishop prevailed: he had the control over the lecturers, the freshmen and students' curriculum. This led to various conflicts between the civil and religious authorities. From 1818 to the office of Great Chancellor was assigned to the president of the Great Civil Court, instead of the bishop.

== Departments ==
Following the Italian higher education reform introduced by the law 240/10 and adopted by the University of Catania in its new statute, faculties have been deactivated and departments have been reorganized. The University of Catania now has 17 departments, the Faculty of Medicine, and two special didactic units established in the decentralized offices of Ragusa (Modern Languages) and Syracuse (Architecture). that, additionally to the traditional assignments of scientific research, are in charge of the organization and management of educational activities. A special didactic unit is also the school of excellence "Scuola Superiore di Catania", a higher education centre of the University of Catania conceived in 1998 to select the best young minds and offer them a course of studies including analysis, research and experimentation.

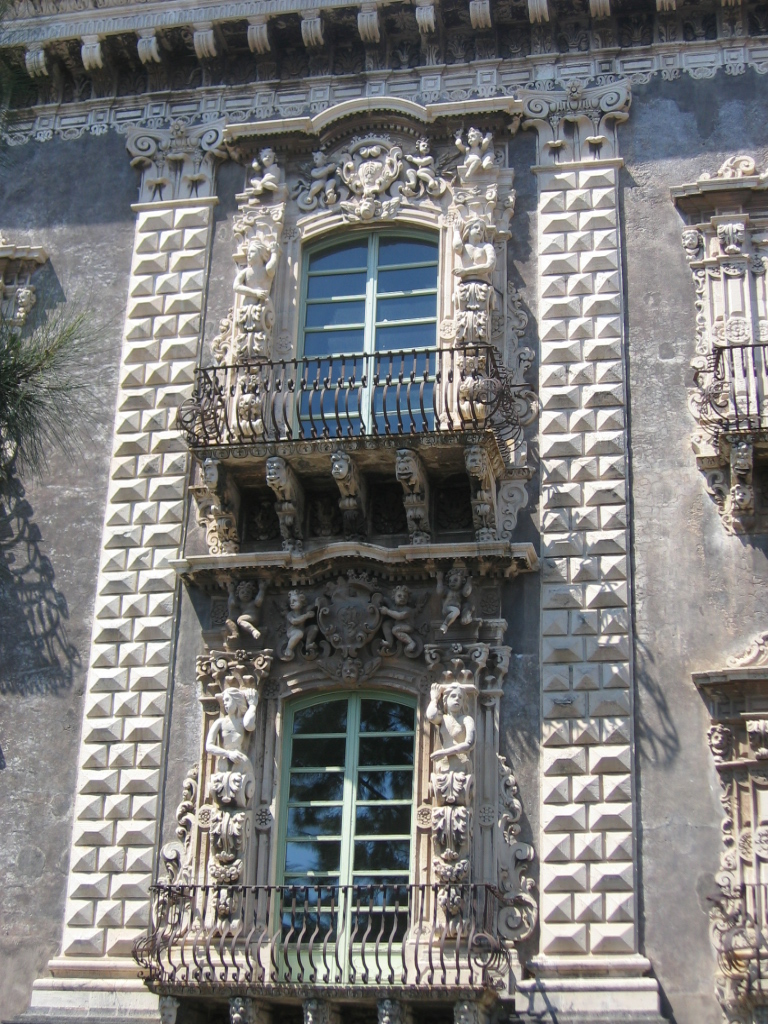
Detail of the University of Catania, from the faculty of humanities in the Monastery of San Nicolò l'Arena

Department	Short name	Director	Field
Agriculture, Food and Environment	Di3A	Prof. Mario D'Amico	Agriculture
Economics and Business	DEI	Prof. Roberto Cellini	Economics
Law	LAW	Prof. Salvatore Angelo Zappalà	Law
Civil Engineering and Architecture	DICAR	Prof. Mattia Ignaccolo	Engineering
Electric, Electronic and Computer Engineering	DIEEI	Prof. Giovanni Antonio Muscato	Engineering
Mathematics and Computer Science	DMI	Prof. Orazio Muscato	Mathematical and Computer Science
Physics and Astronomy "Ettore Majorana"	DFA	Prof. Stefano Romano	Physics
Chemical Sciences	DSC	Prof.ssa Graziella Malandrino	Chemistry
Biological, Geological and Environmental Sciences	DIPBIOGEO	Prof. Rosolino Cirrincione	Natural Sciences
Humanities	DISUM	Prof.ssa Stefania Rimini	Foreign Languages, Letters and Philosophy
Medical, Surgical Sciences and Advanced Technologies "GF Ingrassia"	DGFI	Prof.ssa Antonella Agodi	School "Faculty of Medicine" - Medicine and Surgery
General Surgery and Medical-Surgical Specialties	CHIRMED	Prof. Pierfrancesco Veroux	School "Faculty of Medicine" - Medicine and Surgery
Biomedical and Biotechnological Sciences	BIOMETEC	Prof.ssa Maria Angela Sortino	School "Faculty of Medicine" - Medicine and Surgery
Clinical and Experimental Medicine	MEDCLIN	Prof.ssa Lucia Frittitta	School "Faculty of Medicine" - Medicine and Surgery
Political and Social Sciences	DSPS	Prof.ssa Francesca Longo	Political Science
Drug Sciences	DSF	Prof. Rosario Pignatello	Pharmacy
Educational Sciences	DISFOR	Prof.ssa Rosa Loredana Cardullo	Education
Architecture	SDSARCHITETTURA	Prof. Fausto Carmelo Nigrelli	Special Didactic Units
Foreign Languages and Literatures	SDSLINGUE	Prof. Fabrizio Impellizzeri	Special Didactic Units
Scuola Superiore di Catania	SSC	Prof.ssa Ida Angela Nicotra	Special Didactic Units
School of Italian Language and Culture	ITALSTRA		Special Didactic Units

== Notable alumni ==
=== Humanities ===
- Giuseppe De Felice Giuffrida, Italian politician and journalist, was elected the first Socialist mayor of Catania in 1902.
- Mario Rapisardi, Italian poet and translator, taught at the university in the 1870s. "Love truth more than glory, more than peace, more than life. Make it your sword and your shield."
- Luigi Capuana, writer, journalist, literary critic and theorist. He taught literature in the early years of the 20th century.
- Giovanni Verga, Italian realist writer, author of the Cavalleria Rusticana and I Malavoglia.
- Santo Mazzarino, leading 20th-century historian of ancient Rome and Greece.
- Vitaliano Brancati, Italian novelist and screenwriter, winner of the 1950 Bagutta Prize.
- Elémire Zolla, Italian essayist, philosopher and historian of religion, taught linguistics in the late 1960s.
- Vincenzo Ortoleva, Professor of Classical Philology
- Raoul Vecchio, Engineer and architect.

=== Sciences ===
- Mario Pieri, mathematician, taught descriptive, projective and higher geometry from 1900 to 1908 and supervised 6 doctoral students with dissertations in algebraic geometry. See The Legacy of Mario Pieri in Geometry and Arithmetic, Birkhäuser (E.A. Marchisotto & J.T. Smith) (2007).
- Giuseppe Mercalli, inventor of the Mercalli Scale of earthquake intensity, was professor of geology in the late 1880s.
- Annibale Ricco, named Chair of Astrophysics in 1890, was the first director of the Catania Observatory. He was also Chancellor of the university from 1898 to 1900. The crater Ricco on the Moon as well as the asteroid 18462 Ricco are named for him.
- Guido Fubini, author of Fubini's theorem, was a professor of mathematics in the early years of the 20th century. The asteroid, 22495 Fubini, is named in his honor.
- Remo Ruffini, former assistant professor at Princeton University (1971–74), was professor of theoretical physics from 1976 to 1978. He was named Space Scientist of the Year in 1992.
- Paolo Maffei, director of the Catania Observatory from 1975 to 1980, was one of the pioneers of infrared astronomy. He discovered 2 galaxies, Maffei 1 and Maffei 2 in 1967. A main belt asteroid, 18426 Maffei, is also named for him.
- Giuseppe Colombo, physicist and astronomer, NASA consultant and early proponent of tethered satellites. Asteroid 10387 Bepicolombo is named in his honor, as is the Colombo Gap, a 150 km gap in the C ring of the planet Saturn.
- Napoleone Ferrara, molecular biologist, winner of the 2010 Lasker-DeBakey Clinical Medical Research Award, is a 1981 graduate of the Faculty of Medicine.

== Institutes ==
- Orto Botanico dell'Università di Catania, the university's botanical garden, founded in 1858.
- Catania Astrophysical Observatory, the university's observatory, founded in 1890.

== See also ==
- Scuola superiore di Catania (school of excellence of the University of Catania)
- List of the oldest universities
- List of Italian universities
- List of medieval universities
