= Cardinals created by Sixtus V =

Catholic appointments from 1585 to 1589

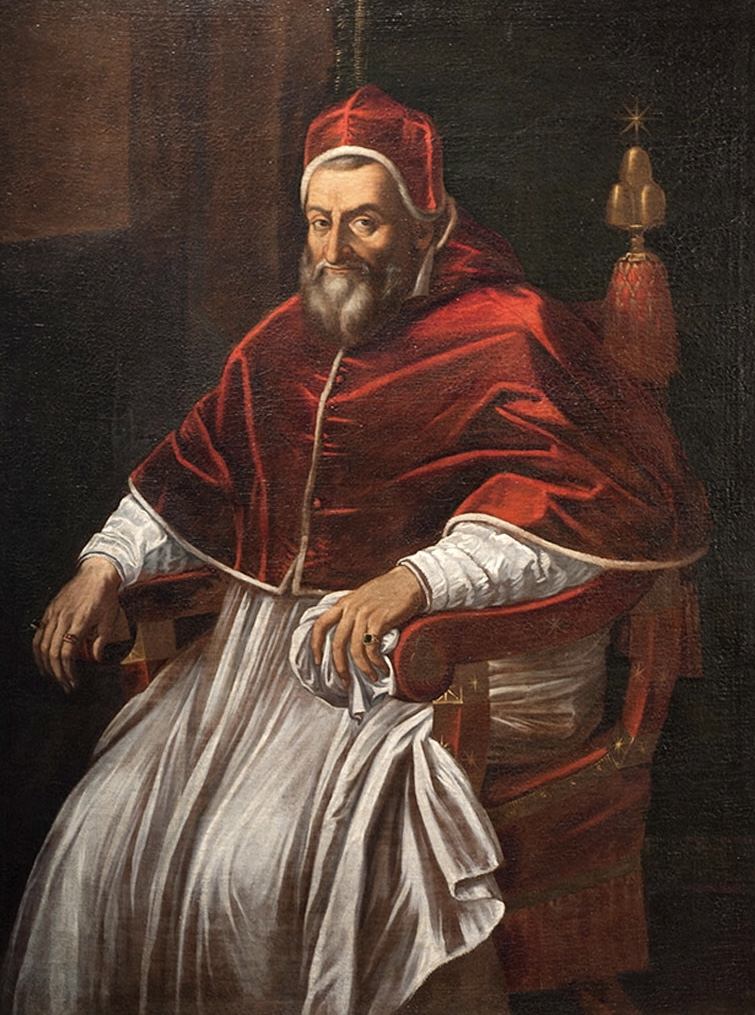
Pope Sixtus V (1520-90).

Pope Sixtus V (r. 1585–1590) created 33 new cardinals in eight consistories:

== 13 May 1585 ==
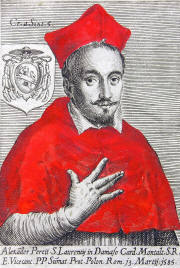
Alessandro Peretti di Montalto (1571-1623), made a cardinal on May 13, 1585.

1. Alessandro Peretti di Montalto, grand-nephew of the Pope – cardinal-deacon of S. Girolamo degli Schiavone (received the title on 14 June 1585), then cardinal-deacon of S. Maria in Cosmedin (20 April 1587), cardinal-deacon of S. Eustachio (11 September 1587), cardinal-deacon of S. Lorenzo in Damaso (13 March 1589), cardinal-priest of S. Lorenzo in Damaso (30 March 1620), cardinal-bishop of Albano (6 April 1620), † 2 June 1623

== 18 December 1585 ==
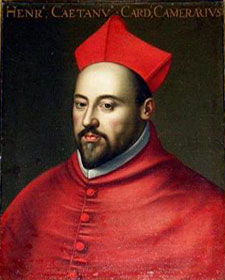
Enrico Caetani (1550-99), made a cardinal on December 18, 1585.

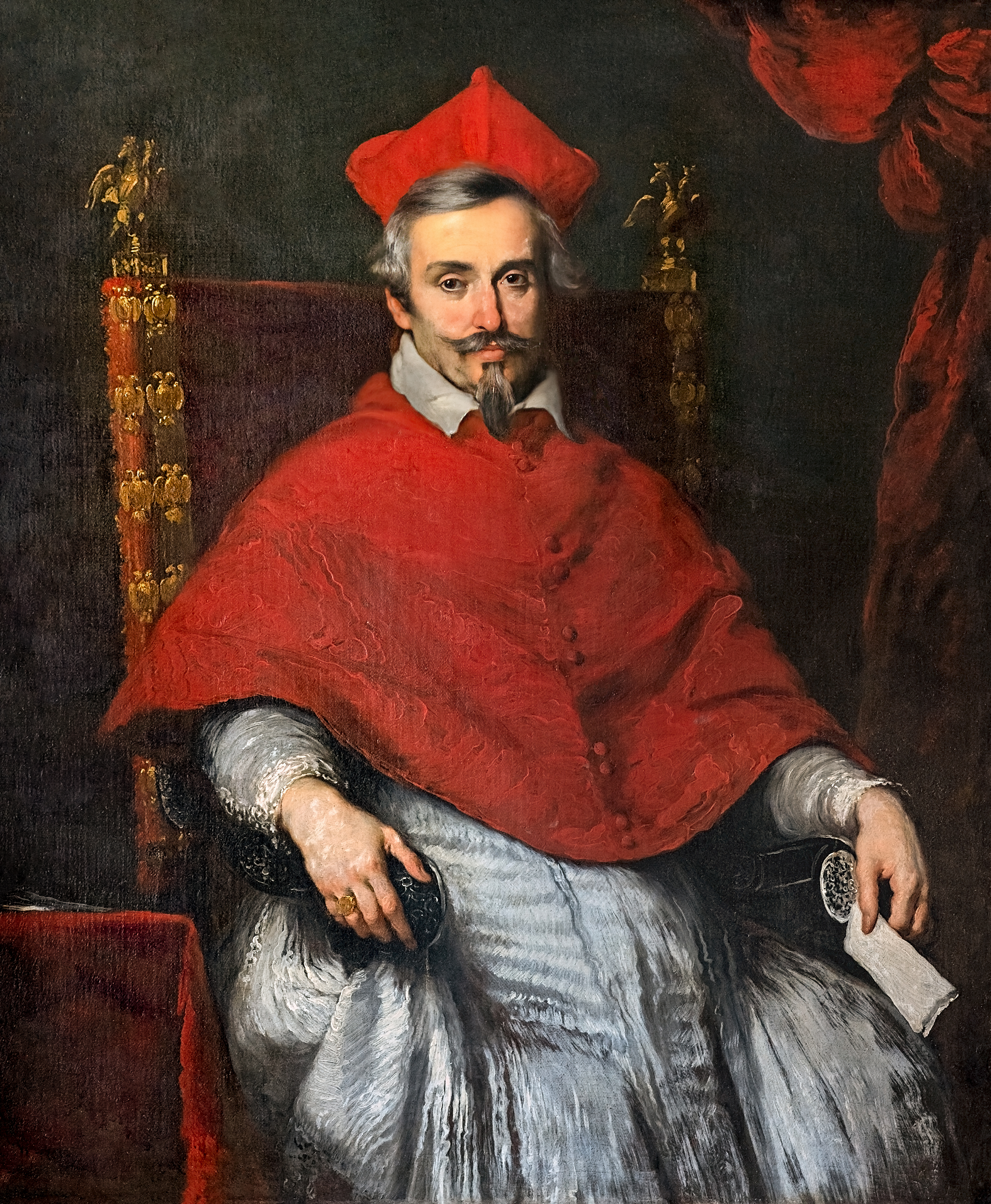
Federico Baldissera Bartolomeo Cornaro (1579-1653), made a cardinal on December 18, 1585.

All the new cardinals received their titular churches on 15 January 1586.

1. Enrico Caetani, titular patriarch of Antioch – cardinal-priest of S. Pudenziana, † 13 December 1599
2. György Drašković, archbishop of Kalocsa-Bacs – cardinal-priest without the title, † 21 January 1587
3. Giovanni Battista Castrucci, archbishop of Chieti – cardinal-priest of S. Maria in Aracoeli, then cardinal-priest of SS. Giovanni e Paolo (14 February 1592), † 18 August 1595
4. Federico Cornaro, O.S.Io.Hieros., bishop of Padua – cardinal-priest of S. Stefano al Monte Celio, † 4 October 1590
5. Ippolito de Rossi, bishop of Pavia – cardinal-deacon of S. Maria in Portico, then cardinal-priest of San Biagio dell'Anello (27 April 1587), † 28 April 1591
6. Domenico Pinelli – cardinal-priest of S. Lorenzo in Panisperna, then cardinal-priest of S. Crisogono (14 January 1591), cardinal-priest of S. Maria in Trastevere (22 April 1602), cardinal-bishop of Albano (19 February 1603), cardinal-bishop of Frascati (16 June 1603), cardinal-bishop of Porto e S. Rufina (1 June 1605), cardinal-bishop of Ostia e Velletri (7 February 1607), † 9 August 1611
7. Decio Azzolini, bishop of Cervia – cardinal-priest of S. Matteo in Merulana, † 9 October 1587
8. Ippolito Aldobrandini, datary of His Holiness – cardinal-priest of S. Pancrazio; became Pope Clement VIII on 30 January 1592, † 5 March 1605

== 16 November 1586 ==
1. Girolamo della Rovere, archbishop of Turin – cardinal-priest of S. Pietro in Vincoli (received the title on 14 January 1587), † 26 January 1592
2. Philippe de Lenoncourt – cardinal-priest of S. Onofrio (received the title on 15 January 1588), † 13 December 1592
3. Girolamo Bernerio O.P., bishop of Ascoli-Piceno – cardinal-priest of S. Tommaso in Parione (received the title on 14 January 1587), then cardinal-priest of S. Maria sopra Minerva (8 November 1589), cardinal-priest of S. Lorenzo in Lucina (17 June 1602), cardinal-bishop of Albano (16 June 1603), cardinal-bishop of Porto e S. Rufina (7 February 1607), † 5 August 1611
4. Antonio Maria Galli, bishop of Perugia – cardinal-priest of S. Agnese in Agone (received the title on 14 January 1587), then cardinal-priest of S. Prassede (30 August 1600), cardinal-bishop of Frascati (1 June 1605), cardinal-bishop of Palestrina (28 May 1608), cardinal-bishop of Porto e S. Rufina (17 August 1611), cardinal-bishop of Ostia e Velletri (16 September 1615), † 30 March 1620
5. Costanzo da Sarnano O.F.M. Conv. – cardinal-priest of S. Vitale (received the title on 14 January 1587), then cardinal-priest of S. Pietro in Montorio (20 April 1587), † 20 December 1595
6. Girolamo Mattei, auditor of the Apostolic Chamber – cardinal-deacon of S. Adriano (received the title on 14 January 1587), then cardinal-deacon of S. Agata in Suburra (20 April 1587), cardinal-deacon of S. Maria in Cosmedin (11 September 1587), cardinal-deacon of S. Eustachio (20 March 1589), cardinal-priest without the title (16 February 1592), cardinal-priest of S. Pancrazio (9 March 1592) † 8 December 1603
7. Benedetto Giustiniani, treasurer general of the Apostolic Chamber – cardinal-deacon of S. Giorgio in Velabro (received the title on 14 January 1587), then cardinal-deacon of S. Agata in Suburra (20 April 1587), cardinal-deacon of S. Maria in Cosmedin (20 March 1589), cardinal-priest of S. Marcello (7 January 1591), cardinal-priest of S. Prisca (17 March 1599), cardinal-priest of S. Lorenzo in Lucina (17 August 1611), cardinal-bishop of Palestrina (4 June 1612), cardinal-bishop of Sabina (16 September 1615), cardinal-bishop of Porto e S. Rufina (31 August 1620), † 27 March 1621
8. Ascanio Colonna – cardinal-deacon of SS. Vito e Modesto (received the title on 25 February 1587), then cardinal-deacon of S. Nicola in Carcere (5 December 1588), cardinal-deacon of S. Maria in Cosmedin (14 January 1591), cardinal-priest of S. Maria in Cosmedin (8 November 1599), cardinal-priest of S. Pudenziana (15 December 1599), cardinal-priest of S. Croce in Gerusalemme (30 January 1606), cardinal-bishop of Palestrina (5 June 1606), † 17 May 1608

== 7 August 1587 ==
William Allen (1532-94), made a cardinal on August 7, 1587.

1. William Allen – cardinal-priest of SS. Silvestro e Martino (received the title on 31 August 1587), † 16 October 1594

== 18 December 1587 ==
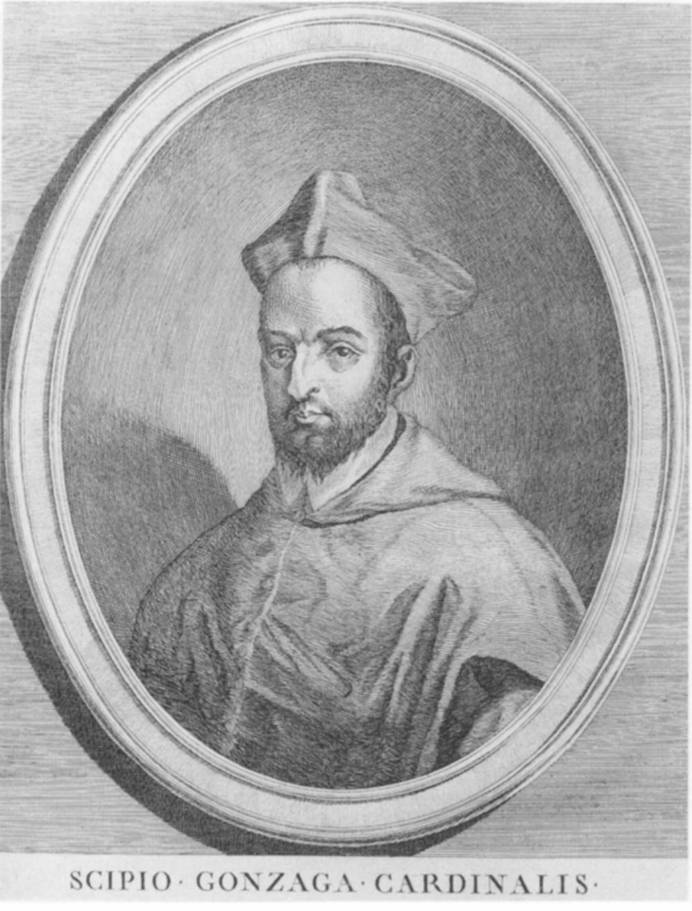
Scipione Gonzaga (1542-93), made a cardinal on December 18, 1587.

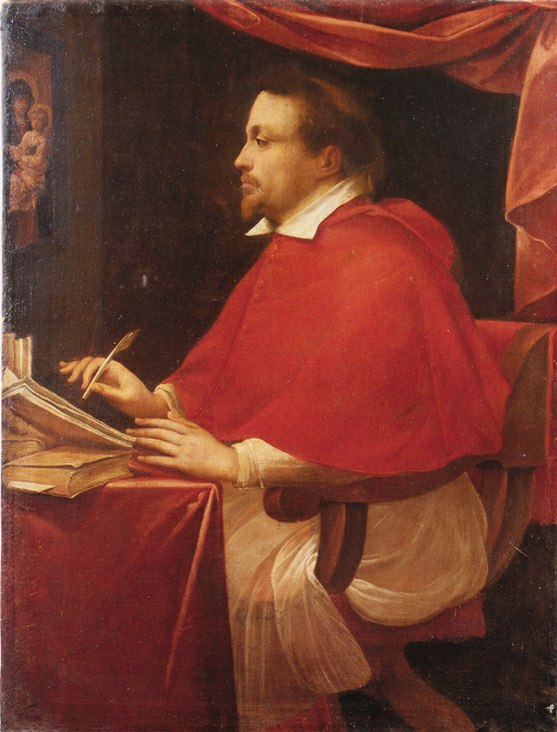
Federico Borromeo (1564-1631), made a cardinal on December 18, 1587.

1. Scipione Gonzaga, titular patriarch of Jerusalem – cardinal-priest of S. Maria del Popolo (received the title on 15 January 1588), † 11 January 1593
2. Antonio Maria Sauli, archbishop of Genoa – cardinal-priest of S. Vitale (received the title on 15 January 1588), then cardinal-priest of S. Stefano al Monte Celio (14 January 1591), cardinal-priest of S. Maria in Trastevere (19 February 1603), cardinal-bishop of Albano (7 February 1607), cardinal-bishop of Sabina (17 August 1611), cardinal-bishop of Porto e S. Rufina (16 September 1615), cardinal-bishop of Ostia e Velletri (6 April 1620), † 24 August 1623
3. Giovanni Evangelista Pallotta, archbishop of Cosenza, datary of His Holiness – cardinal-priest of S. Matteo in Merulana (received the title on 15 January 1588), cardinal-priest of S. Lorenzo in Lucina (16 June 1603), cardinal-bishop of Frascati (24 January 1611), cardinal-bishop of Porto e S. Rufina (6 April 1620), † 22 August 1620
4. Pierre de Gondi, bishop of Paris – cardinal-priest of S. Silvestro in Capite (received the title on 23 May 1588), † 17 February 1616
5. Stefano Bonucci O. Serv., bishop of Arezzo – cardinal-priest of SS. Marcellino e Pietro (received the title on 15 January 1588), † 2 January 1589
6. Juan Hurtado de Mendoza – cardinal-priest of S. Maria Traspontina (received the title on 6 March 1589), † 6 January 1592
7. Hugues Loubenx de Verdalle, O.S.Io.Hieros., Grand Master of Order of St. John of Jerusalem – cardinal-deacon of S. Maria in Portico (received the title on 15 January 1588), † 4 May 1595
8. Federico Borromeo – cardinal-deacon of S. Maria in Domnica (received the title on 15 January 1588), then cardinal-deacon of SS. Cosma e Damiano (9 January 1589), cardinal-deacon of S. Agata in Suburra (20 March 1589), cardinal-deacon of S. Nicola in Carcere (14 January 1591), cardinal-priest of S. Nicola in Carcere (17 September 1593), cardinal-priest of S. Maria degli Angeli (25 October 1593), † 21 September 1631

== 15 July 1588 ==
1. Giovan Francesco Morosini, bishop of Brescia – cardinal-priest of SS. Nereo ed Achilleo (received the title on 27 July 1588), then cardinal-priest of S. Maria in Via (28 March 1590), † 10 January 1596

== 14 December 1588 ==
All the new cardinals received their titular churches on 9 January 1589.

1. Agostino Cusani, auditor general of the Apostolic Chamber – cardinal-deacon of S. Adriano, then cardinal-priest of S. Lorenzo in Panisperna (14 January 1591), cardinal-priest of SS. Giovanni e Paolo (30 August 1595), † 20 October 1598
2. Francesco Maria Bourbon del Monte – cardinal-deacon of S. Maria in Domnica, then cardinal-priest of S. Maria in Domnica (6 March 1591), cardinal-priest of SS. Quirico e Giulitta (5 April 1591), cardinal-priest of S. Maria in Aracoeli (14 February 1592), cardinal-priest of S. Maria in Trastevere (24 January 1611), cardinal-priest of S. Lorenzo in Lucina (4 June 1612), cardinal-bishop of Palestrina (16 September 1615), cardinal-bishop of Porto e S. Rufina (29 March 1621), cardinal-bishop of Ostia e Velletri (27 September 1623), † 27 August 1626

== 20 December 1589 ==
1. Mariano Pierbenedetti, bishop of Martorano – cardinal-priest of SS. Marcellino e Pietro (received the title on 15 January 1590), then cardinal-priest of S. Maria in Trastevere (7 February 1607), cardinal-bishop of Frascati (28 May 1608), † 21 January 1611
2. Gregorio Petrocchini, O.E.S.A., master general of the order of Augustinians – cardinal-priest of S. Agostino (received the title on 23 March 1590), then cardinal-priest of S. Maria in Trastevere (28 May 1608), cardinal-priest of San Lorenzo in Lucina (24 January 1611), cardinal-bishop of Palestrina (17 August 1611), † 19 May 1612
3. Charles de Lorraine-Vaudémont, el. Metz – cardinal-deacon of S. Agata in Suburra (received the title on 5 April 1591), † 24 November 1607
4. Guido Pepoli – cardinal-deacon of SS. Cosma e Damiano (received the title on 15 January 1590), then cardinal-deacon of S. Eustachio (6 February 1592), cardinal-priest of San Biagio dell'Anello (12 June 1595), cardinal-priest of San Pietro in Montorio (8 January 1596), † 25 January 1599
