= Cardinal de Lenoncourt =

Cardinal de Lenoncourt may refer to:

- Robert de Lenoncourt (1485?–1561), Bishop of Châlons (1535–1549), from Bishop of Auxerre(1554–1560), later Archbishop of Arles, cardinal from 1538.
- Philippe de Lenoncourt (1527–1592), nephew of the above, and also Bishop of Châlons (1550–1556), Bishop of Auxerre (1560–1562), cardinal from 1586.

== See also ==
- Robert de Lenoncourt (archbishop of Reims)
