= Alexander Sauli =

Italian Catholic saint

Saint Alexander Sauli B
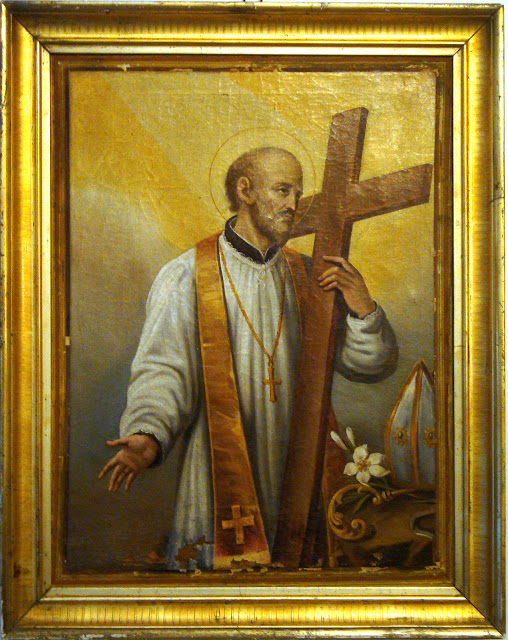

Apostle of Corsica
- Born: 15 February 1534 or 1535; Milan
- Died: 11 October 1592 (aged 58); Calosso, Duchy of Savoy
- Venerated in: Catholic Church (Barnabite Order and Corsica)
- Beatified: 23 April 1741/42 by Pope Benedict XIV
- Canonized: 11 December 1904 by Pope Pius X
- Feast: 11 October
- Patronage: Corsica, Barnabite seminarians

Alexander (Alessandro) Sauli (15 February 1534 – 11 October 1592) was an Italian priest who is called the "Apostle of Corsica". He is a saint of the Catholic Church. In 1571, he was appointed by Pius V to the ancient see of Aléria, Corsica, where he rebuilt churches, founded colleges and seminaries, and improved the presence of the church in the region despite opposition from corsairs.

In 1591, he was made Bishop of Pavia, and died at Calosso the following year. He left a number of works, chiefly catechetical. He was beatified by Benedict XIV, 23 April 1742, and canonized by Pope Pius X, 11 December 1904. His feast is celebrated on October 11.

== Early life ==
Sauli was born in Milan, on February 15, 1534, to an illustrious Lombard family. His parents were Dominic and Tommasina Spinola Sauli. His father was Marquis of Pozzuolo in the territory of Tortona and an assistant to Duke Francesco II Sforza. The marquis was esteemed by the emperor, who was then president of the High Court of Milan. Both of his parents were from ancient and noble families of Genoa. This social status offered Alexander a great opportunity for a prestigious and brilliant career. He was well-educated at Pavia. In 1551, at the age of 17, Sauli became a page at the court of Emperor Charles V in Milan.

== Religious formation ==
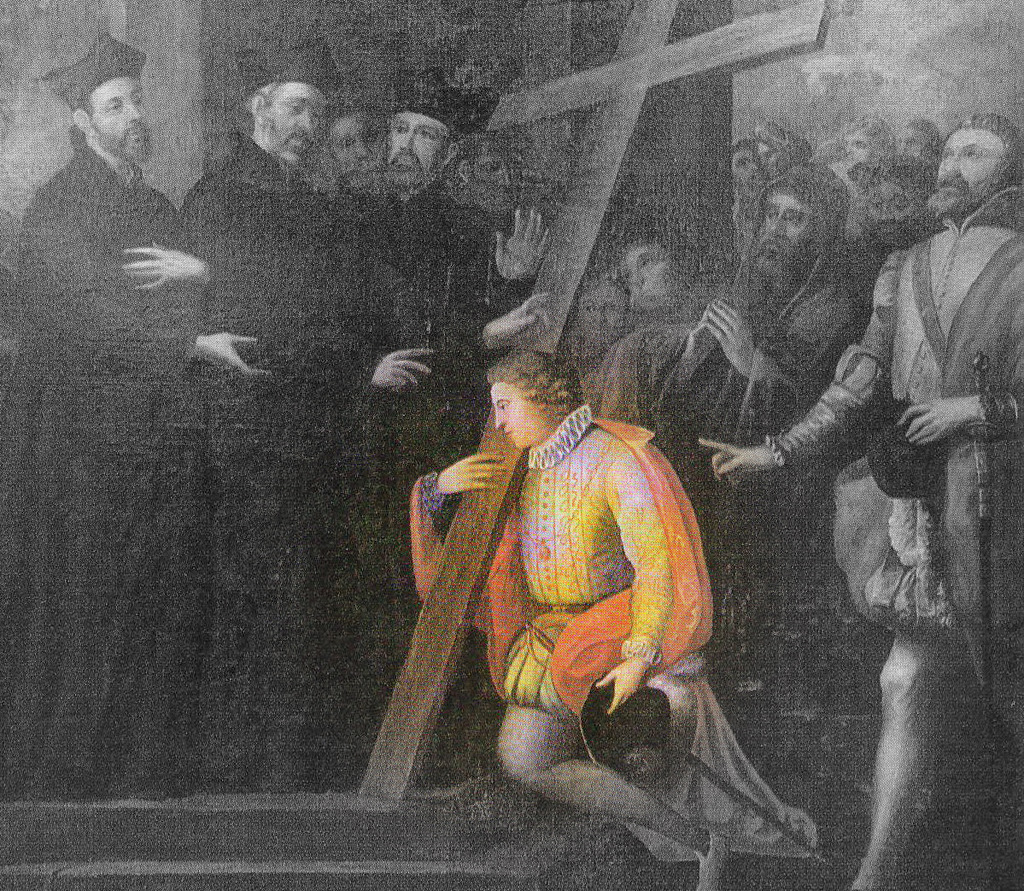
Sauli carrying a cross through the streets of Milan.

At the age of seventeen, Alexander asked to be admitted to the Congregation of the Barnabites. At this time the congregation was experiencing the precariousness of its beginnings, extreme poverty, and harsh trials. It had been expelled from the Republic of Venice only two months before. The Fathers advised Alexander to consider other religious congregations, such as the Dominicans, the Franciscans, and the Capuchins, rich with members outstanding in holiness and wisdom.

On Saturday, 17 May 1551, the Vigil of Pentecost, the Barnabites asked young Sauli to carry a large cross through the streets of Milan, dressed as an imperial page, and to preach in public about the love for God and the renunciation of the world. This would give them an indication whether or not his choice was authentic. With the heavy cross on his shoulders, he crossed the city. When he reached the square called Piazza dei Mercanti, he asked a vendor for his stand. He erected the cross on it, and with great fervor he addressed the crowd about the worship of God and the love of neighbor. When Sauli returned to the Barnabite residence after performing this charge, he was received as a postulant.

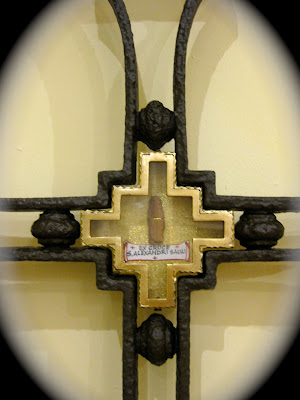
A piece of the cross of St Alexander

At first Sauli was assigned to help the sacristans. On the feast of the Assumption of Mary, August 15, 1551, Sauli received the religious habit and started his three years of novitiate. At a subsequent Chapter Sauli was criticized for ineptitude in his work in the sacristy, his bourgeois attitude, his lukewarmness, and many other things. The minutes were written by a Father Raimondi, who may have disliked Sauli's somewhat open and easy going nature.

In October 1552, he took part in the many sessions during which the first Constitutions of the Order were discussed and finally approved. During the second year of novitiate, Alexander was allowed to follow regular theological studies at the Franciscan Friary of St. Mary of Peace, not far from St. Barnabas. He professed his vows on September 29, 1554. He continued his formation program until April 26, 1556, when the Fathers felt he was mature enough to be removed from the discipline of the novitiate, and was appointed the community librarian. On December 22, 1554, he received the subdiaconate and ordination to the diaconate on June 8, 1555. Due to his young age he had to wait for a special dispensation for the priestly ordination, which took place on March 21, 1556, when he was 22.

== First ministry in Pavia ==
When the Grand Duke Gian Galeazzo Sforza became seriously ill, his mother, Bona of Savoy, and his wife, Isabella of Naples, made a vow that if he should get well, they would build a church in Pavia in honor of the miraculous image of the Virgin Mary painted on a wall of the Canepanova palace. The duke recovered, and the church, designed by Donato Bramante was built. The Barnabites were approached to staff it. This would be the first house of the order after the establishment of the motherhouse of St. Barnabas in 1547. Since Sauli was very familiar with the city and the university, he was assigned there as a preacher, and was soon joined by his two masters, Besozzi and Omodei.

Sauli dedicated himself to pastoral work and encouraged frequent communion and the Forty Hours devotion, He founded schools for religious instructions, offered the people lectures on the Letters of St. Paul, and organized groups at the university. Students asked Sauli for help in their studies. In response he created something of an independent department called an "academy". On February 2, 1560, Sauli celebrated the opening Mass of the Holy Spirit and started weekly conferences on Paul the Apostle and daily repetitions of the university subjects which were divided in three groups: theology, philosophy (or medicine) and law. The teaching was geared to the intelligence and ability of each student, widening their interest to other subjects. He gave ample space to disputes, knowing how well the students would prepare themselves, thereby acquiring self-confidence while clarifying the ideas they were presenting.

Seeing the success that Sauli was having, the Barnabites did not hesitate to open a house of studies for their seminarians, although open to other seminarians and lay people as well. Sauli gave daily classes in theology and philosophy. His method again was innovative. In presenting Aristotle he used the original Greek version avoiding the poor Latin translation of the time and he himself prepared a lexicon to better understand the terminology. In theology, Thomas Aquinas was a requirement, and the students used to say that, if the text of the Summa were to get lost, it was no problem because Sauli knew it by heart. Aquinas was integrated with Bonaventure, the Church Fathers, especially John Chrysostom and Gregory the Great, and contemporary authors such as Savonarola.

How innovative Sauli was is shown by the subsidiary subjects that he introduced, such as geometry which "makes the heart attentive and orderly", and law, so that the students could protect themselves in a world engulfed in never ending legal battles. For the Law of the Church, it was Sauli who suggested to his friend Marcantonio Cucci the preparation of a systematic and well organized exposition of all church laws which was published in 1565 after being revised by him.

Until now Sauli had no official degree of any kind, although he received the Bachelor's degree through a public dispute that he held, between 30 May and 1 June 1560, on 150 theological theses. This was dedicated to Pierpaolo Arrigoni, then the President of the Senate of Milan. The rector of the "Artists" (philosophers and doctors), had offered him a chair of philosophy at the university, but the superior, Besozzi, declined without even notifying Sauli. The Barnabites were concerned that such a position would lead to vain-glory, and to the ruin of their characteristic humility. In any event, in 1562 Sauli had to substitute for Philip Zaffiro, professor of philosophy, lecturing for a semester on the second book of the De Anima. His success and the public’s demand convinced the Fathers to allow him to pursue an official degree.

The Academic Senate dispensed him from the private examination, usually done to test the preparation of a candidate, and for the public exam they allowed him only half a day instead of the customary full day. The subjects selected at random for his exam were: in philosophy, The unity of the creating principle by Peter Lombard and, in theology, the De sacramentis in genere. As a sign of distinction, the examiners were only senior professors. It was his mentor Anthony Aosta, Minister General of the Conventual Franciscan friars, who bestowed on him the doctoral insignia according to tradition: books at first entrusted to him closed, and then opened to symbolize an ongoing need for further studies and renewal, the black hat, symbol of theology, and a golden ring on the right hand, followed by the kiss of peace and a blessing.

After his graduation on May 28, 1563, he became a member of the College of Professors of Theology, teaching philosophy and theology. He was also entrusted with teaching in church the Pauline epistles. He attracted a vast audience, including noted preachers of the day, but Sauli did not follow the career of the pulpit.

Three years later he became dean.

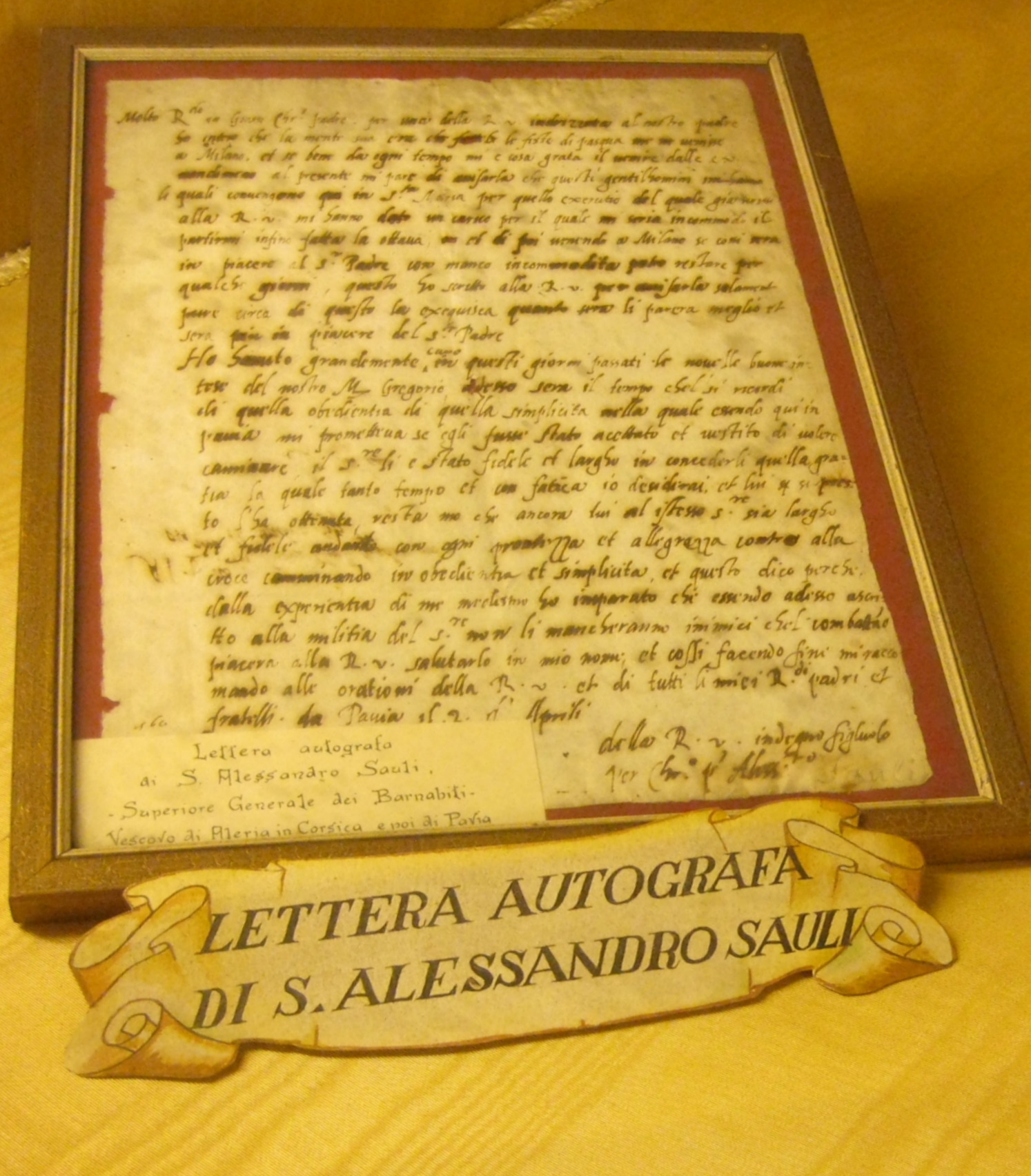
A letter signed by Alexander Sauli

Instead of a permanent job at the university, Sauli preferred to concentrate on the private school of the Order. The Bishop of Pavia, Ippolito de' Rossi had made him his private theologian, examiner of the clergy, lector for the cases of conscience, and an associate for pastoral visits. At the University he participated in the meetings of the professors of theology, gave special lectures and worked on the revision of books.

In the house of studies, Sauli concentrated on the preparation of a complete curricula. He had the gift "for easy explanation. In few words he could present his thought very well. It did not matter how intellectual or difficult they might be", Bellarmino testified at the Apostolic Process. Books at the time were very scarce, so he republished Savonarola's "Confessionale," adapting it to the documents of the Council of Trent, published a treatise on Marriage, an Enchiridion for professors and for those to be ordained, a manual for "Moral Decisions". He published all of them anonymously, but in the second edition De Rossi revealed the name of the true author.

One of Sauli's unique gifts as a professor was that he allowed room for new and fresher minds. In 1563, he gave his philosophy chair to Basilio Bonfanti, a young cleric who already spoke perfect Latin, Greek and Hebrew. Two years later Sauli was his mentor in Bonfanti's public defense of his 200 philosophical and theological theses, which Bonfanti dedicated to Alexander's father, Dominic Sauli, who, from his house in Pavia, was following with great pride his son's progress. The year before, he had donated to the Barnabites his rich and private library.

== Superior General (1566–1569) ==
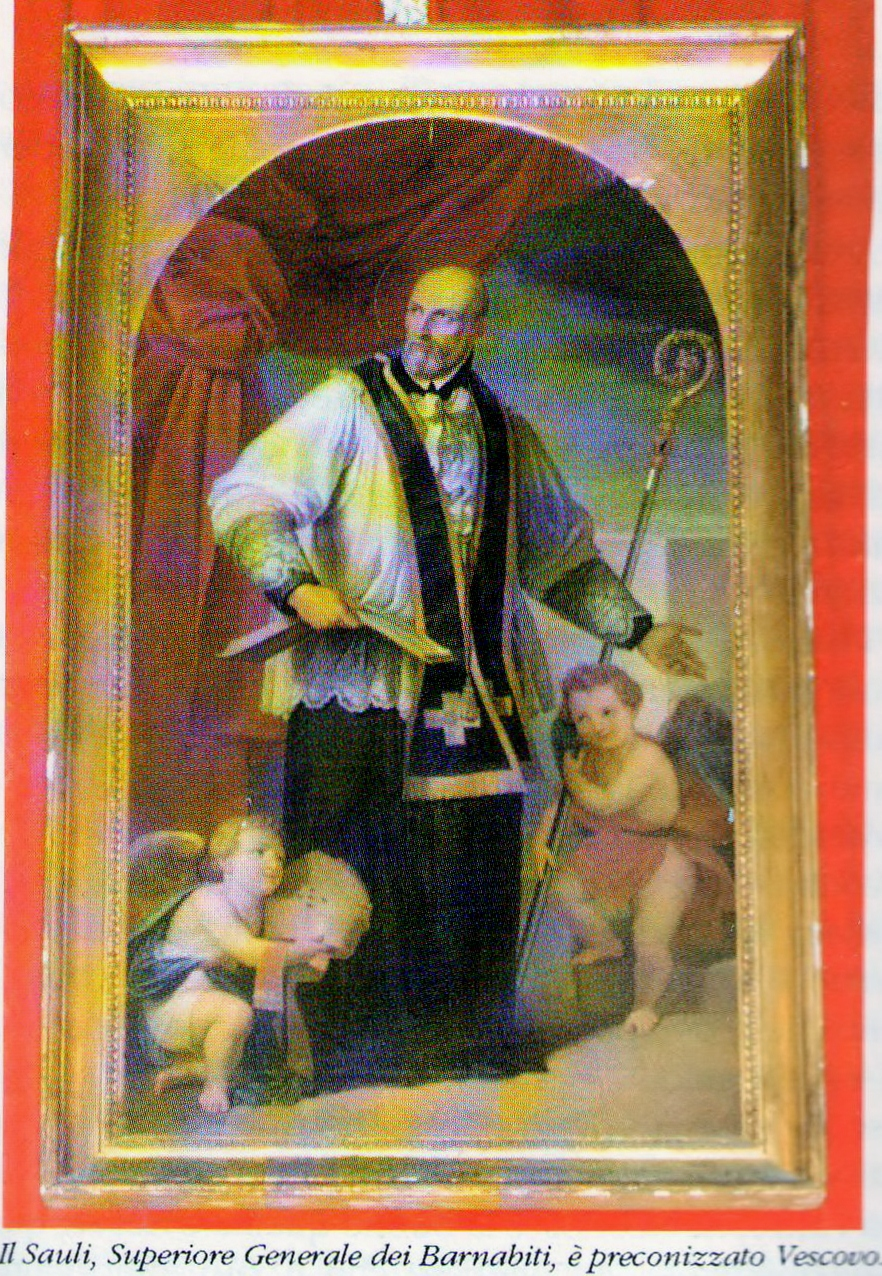
Alexander Sauli - Father General of the Barnabites

In 1567 Sauli was elected superior-general of the congregation. Orazio Premoli, in the biography he wrote in 1904, when Sauli was canonized, said: "As he was, at the young age of 33, elected Superior General of a Religious Congregation, whose members were somewhat elderly, he understood right away that ...To be superior meant for him first of all to lead in the rigorous observance of the Rule, and to be heroically faithful to the vows."

On August 5 he had an unpleasant surprise as Attilio Gritti, a gentleman from Novara, presented himself with pontifical documents claiming possession of the Church and House of St. Barnabas. Sauli immediately contested the claim and the validity of the documents, since Gritti's uncle had donated the church and the house to the Barnabites at the time of Pope Paul III. He entrusted the case into the hands of Charles Borromeo, the Archbishop of Milan, who obtained from Pope Pius IV the resolution of the case.

As a good canon lawyer he made sure that all regulations would comply with the new guidelines emerging from the Council of Trent. In 1568 he called an extraordinary Chapter to deal with the Divine Office. The congregation had adopted the Quinones version of the breviary to be sung in recto tono. In 1568 Pope Pius V published the new breviary eliminating all previous editions. The Chapter (September 10–15) adopted the new breviary, keeping the recto tono recitation.

He wrote rules for the novices and gave guidelines for the curriculum of sacred and profane studies, and for preaching. Sauli was in charge of the monastery of the Angelic Sisters of St. Paul, and of the "Submitted to the Crucified Lord," to whom he gave regular conferences, and with whom he kept regular correspondence even from Corsica. When in 1554 the Countess Torelli left the Angelics, taking with her whatever benefits had been given to the monastery, they survived through the generosity of Julia Sfondrati, but with great tension between the two ladies. Borromeo asked Sauli for the Angelic Sisters of St Paul, and the Jesuit Leonetto Clavonio for the Torelli, to resolve the controversy.

In April 1569, the Bishop of Vicenza, through the recommendation of Borromeo, tried to convince the Barnabites to return to his city for the reformation of the monasteries. Sauli answered, "Yes, on condition that the Serenissima (Venice) will revoke the ban of 1552." Venice's answer was that by now the whole thing had been forgotten, so that they were welcomed back to the Republic. Alexander did not accept those conditions, but in deference to the bishop, he sent over Berna for a few months.

Sauli's term as Superior General was a period of true renewal for the order, renewal to be carried out fully by Charles Borromeo. After the shock of 1552 everything was renewed: better structures, rekindling of the original fervor, the members were reinforced with much better quality. Some of those who had left came back to St. Barnabas. The apostolate expanded to new foundations. Sauli is regarded as the "second Founder" because he gave new vigor to the Order.

== The co-operator of Charles Borromeo ==
Sauli was invited by Charles Borromeo to preach at the cathedral in Milan, where he made a great impression on both Borromeo and the future Pope Gregory XIV. Sauli participated in the first synod of the Archdiocese of Milan and in the first Provincial Council was entrusted with various tasks by Borromeo. As Superior General of the Barnabites, Sauli became part of Borromeo's circle of friends. Almost daily he was consulted for his wisdom and prudence. Some of the Barnabites complained that they had elected a Superior General, not the cardinal's secretary. But senior members of the Order did not mind at all, because this forced the small congregation to come out of the shell in which it had been hiding since their expulsion from Venice. The archbishop was very impartial in calling on all the Barnabites, according to their activities and talents, for specific cases to be resolved.

The altar of the Sacred Heart holds the reliquary donated to him by Borromeo.

Once a month, Borromeo found refuge at the House of St. Barnabas. Moreover, he spent the whole Holy Week with the Community. At first he used Sauli for delicate and secret missions, such as peace among spouses and families, and delicate cases of conscience. He immediately noticed his prudence and common sense, such as when he wanted to reduce the grate of the Monastery of St. Martha. The nuns rebelled, and Sauli counselled him to leave them alone "because it is not really important if the parlor is made one way or the other."

Sauli showed a great balance in his judgment and decision making passing over secondary items to reach the core of the issue. It was characteristic of him. From Mantua Borromeo asked the Fathers of St. Barnabas to send him someone for a general confession. Sauli was sent, which made Charles exclaim: "They have sent me the Superior himself, to my great satisfaction." From then on the two became like one soul, and later Bottomeo said: "From then on I almost started a new course in my spiritual life not taking into consideration at all my previous accomplishments." A particular episode shows their intimacy. When Borromeo miraculously escaped an attempt on his life, he questioned Sauli: "What spiritual benefit should 1 draw for my soul from it," and Sauli answered: "To humble yourself and reflect if God has allowed it in punishment for some of your defects," and then frankly questioned him if he was ready to face God's judgment.

In 1568, during the long stay of Borromeo in Mantua, and while the vicar general, Castelli, was hiding in St. Barnabas, Sauli was to all practical purposes the administrator of the archdiocese, as proved from the long list of practical decisions taken by him as shown in the correspondence between the two. The Second Diocesan Synod of 1569 was completely readied in St. Barnabas.

At one point Borromeo sought to both resolve once and for all the chronic poverty of the congregation, and to reform the Order of the Humiliates, who were absolutely averse to any kind of reform. He wanted to merge the two orders. Sauli opposed this because the union would have been an endless source of internal conflict. This would also have doubled the size of the order, making it practically ungovernable, since the Humiliates did not believe in the need for reform. Borromeo tried an intervention from Rome, but Pope Pius V, well aware of the conditions of the friars, understood Sauli's objections. When Friar Jerome Donati made the famous attempt on Borromemo's life, the Pope suppressed the Order once and for all with a decree signed on 8 February 1571. By that time Sauli was in Corsica.

With great regret Bishop Sauli could not attend Borromeo's funeral, but he furnished Besozzi with many insights and episodes for the publication of his biography, "because," he wrote from Campoloro on June 8, 1585, "until 1570 I too can say many things, since that Holy Soul has communicated to me the most important things that have happened to him."

== Bishop ==
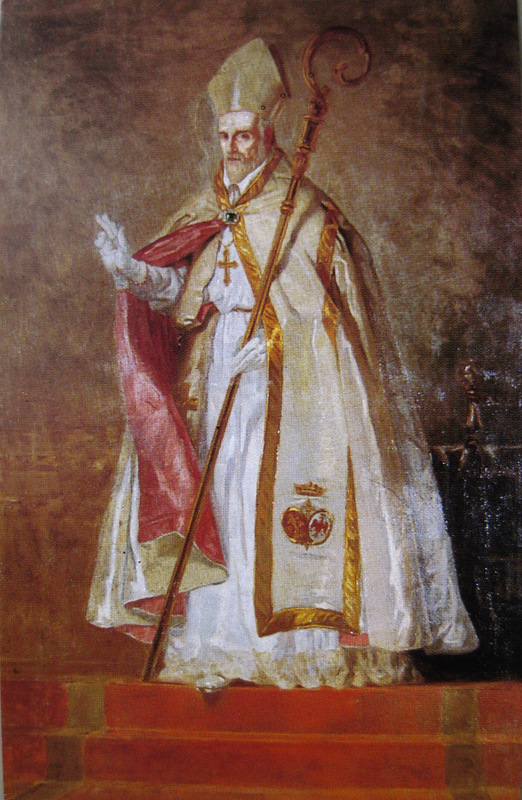
St Alexander Sauli as a Bishop

In 1571, he was appointed by Pius V to the ancient see of Aleria, Corsica, where the state of the Roman Catholic Church was deplorable.

In a letter to the Doge of Genoa, Cardinal Cicada wrote: "This morning February 10, 1570, in a Consistory, the Pope has provided for the Church of Aleria in the person of the Rev. Alexander Sauli, as His Holiness has great trust in the virtues and goodness of this priest for the reformation of the religious and good customs of this island. May the good Lord bring to fruition the pious intentions of His Holiness, who has been motivated by no other aim but the service of God and the salvation of souls, according to the good reports he has received about him, although he has never met or known him."

In Milan the news caused great unrest among the Barnabites who protested, "We have no one who equals him. We have few among us, whom either age does not qualify for active duty, or youth in consequence of their want of experience, does not render unfit for the government of others."

They sought Cardinal Borromeo's help to avert such a disaster. He wrote to his man in Rome, Ormaneto: "Having notified the Superior of St. Barnabas about the decision of Our Lord to give him the care of the Church ofAleria in Corsica, he, for the humble esteem of himself, has stated not to be qualified: which I do not agree with, as I know very well his qualifications.... Meanwhile I cannot avoid to present to His Holiness the great worry of the old Fathers of this Congregation, whom I have notified about it.... because of the great damage coming to their Congregation with the loss of this man, as it relies on his prudent government with great help from his knowledge, in which, truthfully, there is no equal; ... Then, I know too how the city at large will suffer because of it, since the Superior is very useful to it in so many ways, such as conferences and confessions, and other spiritual services, and his prudent counsel, of which I avail myself regularly. If, then, Our Lord believes that he will render greater service to God in his new vocation, he is a son of obedience."

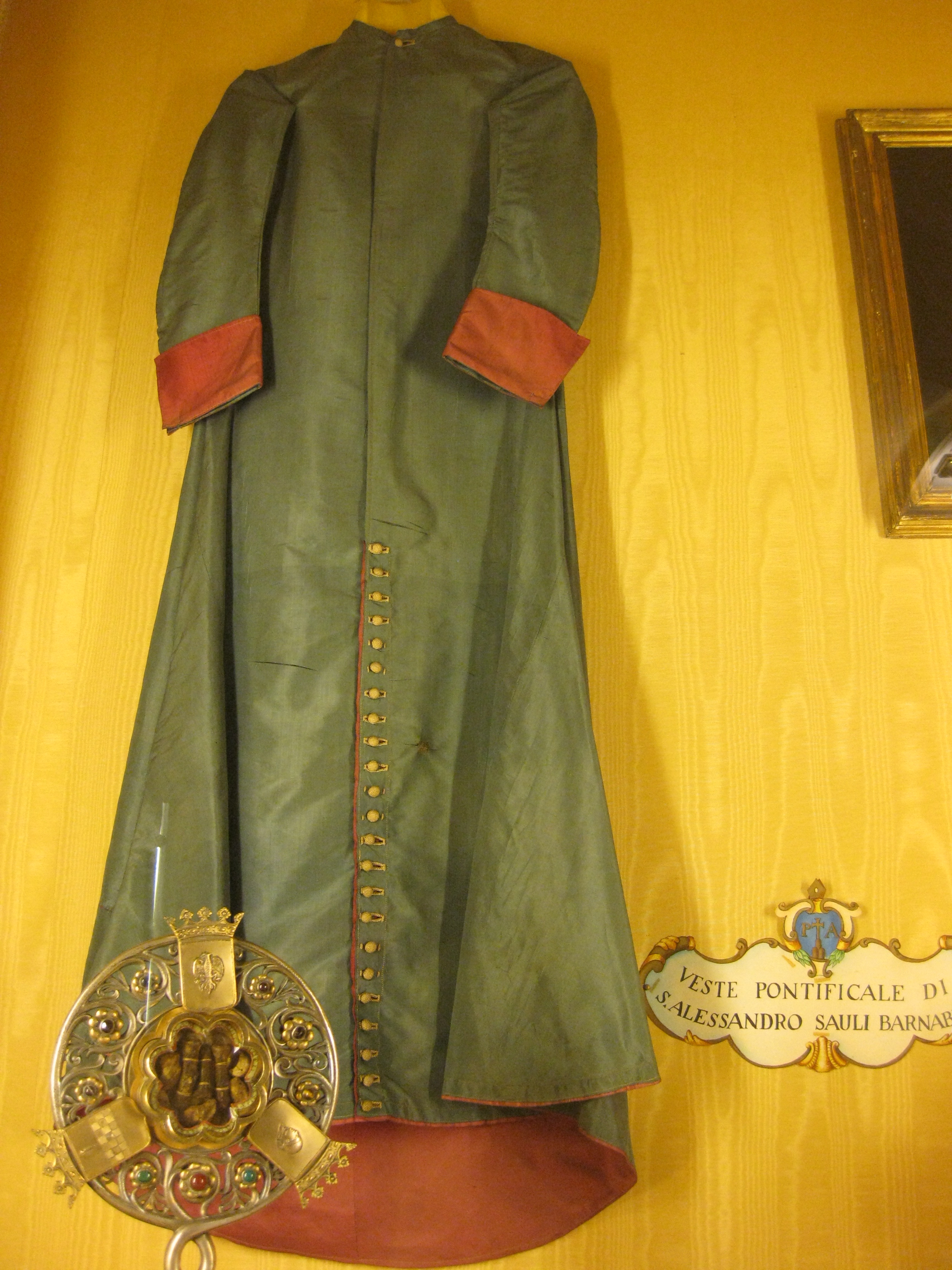
A pontifical vestment of Alexander Sauli

To prepare himself to follow God's will, together with Charles, Sauli went to the Carthusian abbey in Carignano for a retreat. Writing to his father, Alexander stated: "The effort I have endured here as Superior General seems to me like roses in comparison with what I am starting to experience as a Bishop."

The ceremony took place in the Cathedral of Milan on March 12. Sauli was consecrated bishop by his friend, Cardinal Borromeo of Milan, with Ippolito de Rossi, Bishop of Pavia, and Federico Comer, Bishop of Bergamo, as concelebrants. Borromeo provided and donated to him all the episcopal vestments.

== Apostle of Corsica (1570–1590) ==
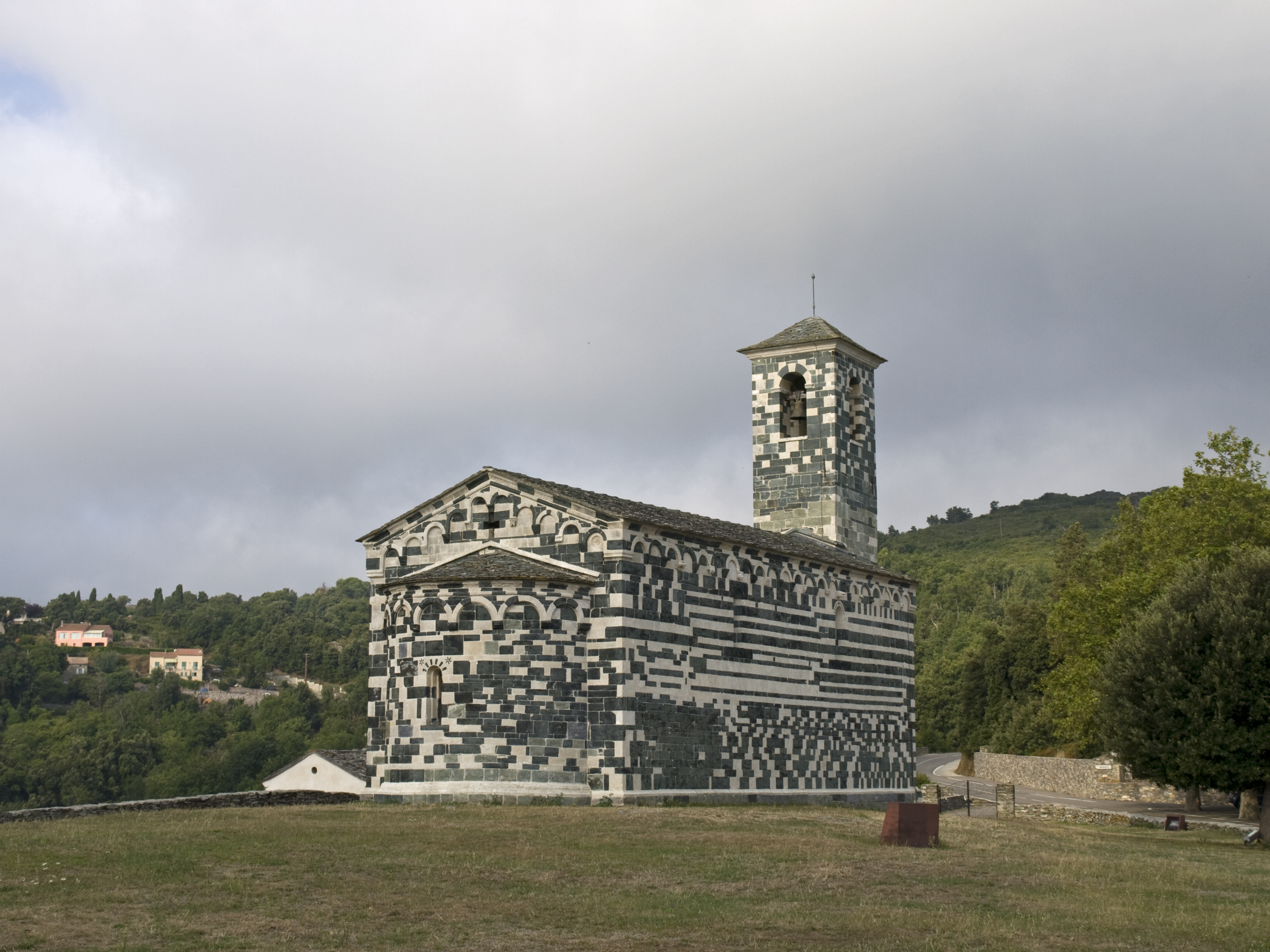
Murato, Corsica, St. Michael Church

Corsica had not seen a bishop in 70 years, and in many ways had fallen into a pitiful condition. Pope Pius V had advised him to bring along to Aléria at least a dozen confreres to help him. But the community could afford only four: three priests, Vincent Corti, Thomas Gambaldi, Francis Stauli, and one Brother, John Battista.

At the end of April 1570, Sauli, his four confreres and a few servants landed in Corsica. The first impact was very harsh because the episcopal residence had been destroyed during the war. Seminaries did not yet exist, and in Corsica there were no schools or universities. Only a few priests could be educated in the main land, while the others were learned a little from those who knew a little more.

On May 18, 1570, the new bishop wrote to Cardinal Borromeo in Milan describing the deplorable conditions:

Most Reverend and honorable my Lord:
It has pleased the Divine Majesty to allow me to reach safe and sound Corsica, and I feel obliged to send you, my reverend greetings and give you news about conditions of my Church of Aleria. ...as I reached Bastia, I had to stop therefore ten days to get the provisions... During that time I received the visit of many of the priests of my diocese. I did not find one who knows Latin, rather many do not even know how to write. I leave to your Illustrious Lordship, to imagine the moral situation here in Corsica, where for a long time there have been wars, where the Bishops did not usually reside in their diocese. My episcopal residence had been the sea and habitation of the guerrilla fighter, Sampiero the Corso, and it has registered more tumults and rebellions than any other section of the island.
I am still in Corte, a devastated area and in ruins. The Fathers of St. Francis have prepared for me two little rooms... Nor can I think to stay here, because the Friars have told me that my overstay would cause too much disturbance in their regular observance; and it seems to me that they are right, because there is a continuous come and go of people, and if any one wishes to come to my room, he is forced to cross through the Friars’ refectory.
What really worries me is that the town is in such ruins and devastation that I am not able to find, what should I say, a house for eighteen people between servants and Fathers that I am taking with me by order of His Holiness, where even two can live. Nor do I have the possibility to build, myself a room, in the Capuchin style, as I have intention to do next year, if God keeps me in life, due to the many expenses I have to face.
During the year I will take residence in Bastia, where I think to stay until harvest time, since in the present moment there is great scarcity. Then I will start the pastoral visit ...I will try always to keep with me some of the priests to instruct them, in the vernacular, the most necessary things about the administration of the Sacraments, and the salvation of souls.
...I close kissing the hands of your Lordship and declare myself a very devout servant. May the Lord God keep you.
From Corte, May 18, 1570.
Your Lordship and reverend devout servant, the Bishop of Aleria

He established himself in precarious and humble dwellings and started immediately the visitation of the whole Diocese, entailing great and severe sacrifices, to bring to all the Word of God "like a beneficial rain that the good Lord sends on a field for long time arid and destroyed." By the end of August he was able to hold a synod with 150 priests present to set up rules and regulations.

The synod became an annual event of three days. Albert Grozio, the Bishop's secretary wrote: "He took advantage of these days to live heart to heart with his priests who were invited, if they wanted, to live with him at his own expenses. He ate with them, talked with each one of them, and was generous in his charity. To instruct them he used to create cases of conscience, going over liturgical formulas, dogmatic or moral principles, and counciliar and ecclesiastical documents. At the end of the synod most of the priests had to face a most arduous trip back home, so he used to prepare for them and their laity, abundant provisions, giving them horses, wine, or whatever could be useful for the trip."

With the passing years he provided his clergy with various booklets of instructions including a simplified edition of the Roman catechism so much praised by Francis de Sales.

In the following years he often changed residence to be able to have a good knowledge of his people. He founded a seminary in Bastia, and he dedicated himself to all, in spite of his sickness, like malaria and high fever, which few times brought him to the point of death. He transferred his see to escape the malaria-ridden swamplands around Aléria to Cervione, where, in 1578, he built the Cathedrale St-Erasme.

The factional enmity, the famines, and droughts very much tested Alexander's charity. The pacification of vendettas was a significant part of his pastoral activity. One individual made an attempt on his life. Due to his efforts to end the violence, the people called him "The Angel of Peace".

From letters written when Sauli was appointed a bishop, it seems that Borromeo thought that he would be wasted in Corsica, and tried on various occasions to have him transferred back to his province, always crashing against Sauli's humility, who wanted to "leave his bones in Corsica."

The Corsicans thought to be able to keep him for life. When the news reached them that the Republic of Genoa wanted him to be the coadjutor of the archbishop with the right of succession, they mobilized themselves. They begged the Pope and the Republic to change their decision. The letter they sent to the Pope is a long list of warm praises and Sauli was able to stay for another seven years among the Corsicans.

He corrected abuses, rebuilt churches, founded colleges and seminaries, and despite the depredations of corsairs, and the death of his comrades, he placed the Church in a flourishing condition. Because of his heroic charity, especially during the time of famine and pestilence, he was called “The Guardian Angel and Apostle of Corsica.”

== Bishop of Pavia (1591–1592) ==
What the Corsicans feared in 1584 became a reality in 1591: Pope Gregory XIV, who in Pavia had used Alexander Sauli as his spiritual director, named him successor of Cardinal Ippolito De Rossi, as Bishop of Pavia. The nomination gave great joy to the people of Pavia, but caused tears all over Corsica, tears which accompanied the shepherd to the boat taking him to Rome.

He remained there for two weeks, spending some time in Genoa and at St. Barnabas in Milan, before taking possession of his new diocese on October 19, 1591.

The charity which had made him famous in Corsica immediately became one of his outstanding virtues also in Pavia, since a severe famine had made prices of vital items, such as wheat, climb out of reach. On the first Sunday after his entry, he celebrated a solemn pontifical Mass during which, in simple and clear words, he expressed his desire to be the father of the poor, ready to give them whatever he would receive. As a first sign of his commitment, he ordered four noblemen, and his helpers to distribute a purse with one hundred golden scuds. His action was so contagious it generated a chain reaction in generosity throughout that day, bringing the purse to a very sizeable amount.

Wanting to have a first hand knowledge of his diocese, he started a pastoral visit right away, planning to close it with a synod. He introduced and promoted the Forty Hours Devotions. He dedicated himself also to pastoral services visiting hospitals, monasteries, and schools.

== Death and veneration ==
He left a number of works, chiefly catechetical.

Although for some time he had been sick on and off with fever, toward the end of September 1592, Sauli began the pastoral visit of his new diocese.

After presiding at the ordinations in Bursignano, he reached Colosso d'Asti on October 1, where he spent the day in preaching, catechesis, confirmations, and personal meetings. That night he became sick with fever and gout. Not wanting to disturb the local parish priest, he decided to accept the invitation of his friend, Count Ercole Roero, to stay at his castle. He died on Sunday, October 11, 1592. A few days before he had said: "Don't think that I am dying because of the efforts of this pastoral visit; be convinced that this is the hour fixed by God. If I should start all over what I have done, I would do it over again."

The body was brought to Pavia on October 14, and the next day the solemn funeral took place. His universal fame as a saint spread immediately and grew steadily. The unanimous consensus and great devotion, especially in Pavia, led, in 1623, to the initiation of the canonical process. He was beatified by Benedict XIV, 23 April 1742, and canonized by Pope Pius X, 11 December 1904. Alexander Sauli is the patron saint of Barnabite seminarians. His feast is celebrated on October 11.

The political and religious events of the 1700s and 1800s put on trial the life of religious orders; therefore, the journey toward canonization experienced a very long pause. Anyway, after the Holy Founder reached the glory of the altar in 1897, Alexander Sauli too reached the same honor. On December 11, 1904, Pius X inscribed him among the saints of the universal Church. The two required miracles, certified and approved by a diocesan and apostolic trial, had taken place one in 1899, in Bastia, Corsica, to the 20-year-old Maria Canessa, and the other in Monza, in 1741, during the celebration of his beatification, the cure of a certain Carlo Riva who had been paralyzed for more than a year.

== Legacy ==
In 1626 the Barnabites were called from Milan to Saint Michael Church in Vienna, where there is an altar dedicated to Saint Alexander Sauli. A sculpture, The Blessed Alesandro Sauli, made by Pierre Puget can be found in the Santa Maria Assunta church in Carignano, Genoa. A terra-cotta copy can be found at the Cleveland Museum of Art or the Saint Louis art museum.

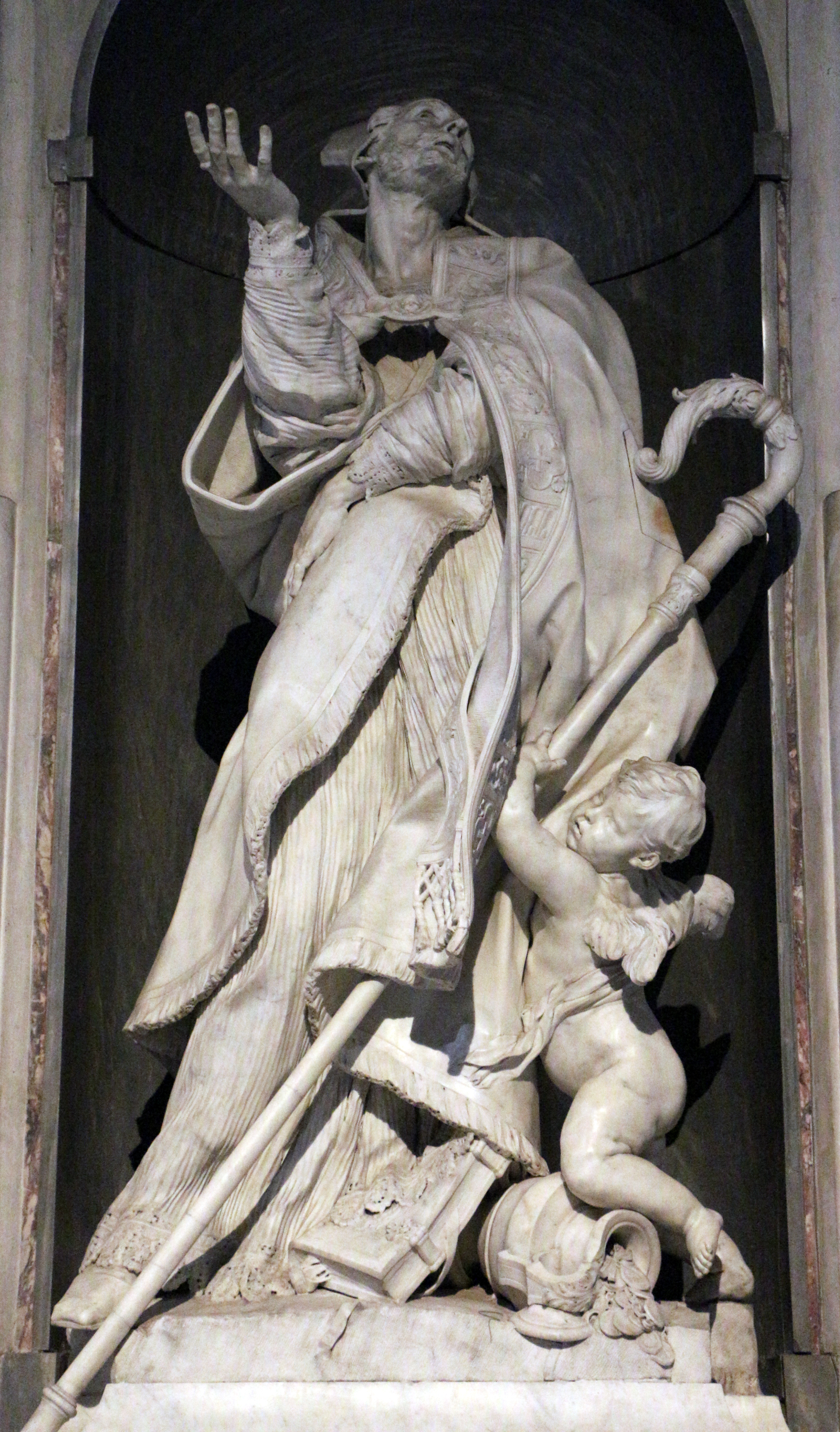
Sculpture by Pierre puget, Alessandro Sauli, 1668, Santa Maria Assunta church in Carignano, Genoa

== Bibliography ==
- Picinelli, Filippo (1670). Ateneo dei letterati milanesi. Milan: Francesco Vigone. pp. 15–6.
- Frigerio, D. (1992). Alessandro Sauli: Vescovo e Santo di Ieri e di Oggi (1534–1592). Milano: Edizione "La Voce".
