= Girolamo Pamphilj =

17th-century Catholic cardinal

His Eminence Girolamo Pamphilj
- Cardinal-Priest of San Biagio dell'Anello
- Church: Catholic Church

Personal details
- Born: 1544 Rome, Italy
- Died: 11 Aug 1610 (age 66)

Girolamo Pamphilj or Girolamo Pamphili (1544–1610) was a Roman Catholic cardinal and member of the Pamphili family.

Catholic Church titles
Preceded by Bonviso Bonvisi	Cardinal-Priest of San Biagio dell'Anello; 1604–1610	Succeeded by Orazio Spínola
