= Giovanni Girolamo de' Rossi =

16th-century Roman Catholic bishop

Most Reverend Giovanni Girolamo de' Rossi
- Bishop of Pavia
- Church: Catholic Church
- Diocese: Diocese of Pavia
- In office: 1550–1564
- Predecessor: Giovanni Maria Ciocchi del Monte
- Successor: Ippolito de' Rossi

Giovanni Girolamo de' Rossi or Giovan Girolamo de' Rossi (19 May 1505 - 5 April 1564) was a Roman Catholic prelate who served as Bishop of Pavia (1550–1564) and (1530–1541).

== Biography ==
On 3 June 1530, he was appointed during the papacy of Pope Clement VII as Bishop of Pavia, where he served until his resignation in 1541. On 22 February 1550, he was appointed during the papacy of Pope Julius III once again as Bishop of Pavia. He served as Bishop of Pavia until his resignation on 4 Sep 1564.

== External links and additional sources ==
- Cheney, David M. "Diocese of Pavia". Catholic-Hierarchy.org. (for Chronology of Bishops)
- Chow, Gabriel. "Diocese of Pavia (Italy)". GCatholic.org. (for Chronology of Bishops)

Catholic Church titles
Preceded by Giovanni Maria Ciocchi del Monte	Bishop of Pavia (1st time); 1530–1541	Succeeded by Giovanni Maria Ciocchi del Monte
Preceded by Giovanni Maria Ciocchi del Monte	Bishop of Pavia (2nd time); 1550–1564	Succeeded by Ippolito de' Rossi
