= Giovanni Battista Albani =

Roman Catholic prelate (died 1588)

Most Reverend Giovanni Battista Albani
- Patriarch of Alexandria
- Church: Catholic Church
- Archdiocese: Latin Patriarchate of Alexandria
- In office: 1586–1588
- Predecessor: Enrico Caetani
- Successor: Camilli Caetani

Orders
- Consecration: 30 Mar 1586 by Giulio Antonio Santorio

Personal details
- Died: 1588

Giovanni Battista Albani (died 1588) was a Roman Catholic prelate who served as Patriarch of Alexandria (1586–1588).

== Biography ==
On 24 March 1586 Albani was appointed during the papacy of Pope Sixtus V as Titular Patriarch of Alexandria. On 30 Mar 1586, he was consecrated bishop by Giulio Antonio Santorio, Cardinal-Priest of San Bartolomeo all'Isola, with Filippo Mocenigo, Archbishop of Nicosia, and Giuseppe Donzelli, Archbishop of Sorrento, serving as co-consecrators. He was Patriarch of Alexandria until his death in 1588.

== Episcopal succession ==
While Patriarch, he was the principal co-consecrator of:

- Antonio Migliori, Bishop of San Marco (1586);
- Costanzo de Sarnano, Bishop of Vercelli (1587);
- Ferdinand de Rye, Archbishop of Besançon (1587);
- Fabio Biondi, Patriarch of Jerusalem (1588); and
- Owen Lewis (bishop), Bishop of Cassano all'Jonio (1588).

Catholic Church titles
Preceded by Enrico Caetani	Patriarch of Alexandria; 1586–1588	Succeeded by Camilli Caetani
