= Orazio Spínola =

17th-century Catholic cardinal

His Eminence Orazio Spínola
- Cardinal-Priest of San Biagio dell'Anello; Archbishop of Genoa
- Church: Catholic Church

Orders
- Consecration: 1 Apr 1601 by Alfonso Paleotti

Personal details
- Born: 1547 Rome, Italy
- Died: 24 Jun 1616 (age 69)

Orazio Spínola (1547–1616) was a Roman Catholic cardinal and member of the Pamphili family. The Cardinal designed to episcopally crown the venerated image of Madonna delle Vigne, promising its people to crown it every year on its centennial anniversary.

The image was not crowned in 1916 due to the First World War, but Pope Benedict XV felt national piety for his birthplace and issued a decree of coronation towards the image on 1 November 1920 via his Papal legate, the Archbishop of Genoa Cardinal Tommaso Pio Boggiani.

== Biography ==
On 1 Apr 1601, he was consecrated bishop by Alfonso Paleotti, Archbishop of Bologna. and member of the Pamphili family. While bishop, he was the principal consecrator of Innocenzo Massimi, Bishop of Bertinoro (1615).

Catholic Church titles
Preceded by Matteo Rivarola	Archbishop of Genoa; 1600–1616	Succeeded by Domenico de' Marini
Preceded by Girolamo Pamphilj	Cardinal-Priest of San Biagio dell'Anello; 1616	Succeeded by None
