= Bonviso Bonvisi =

17th-century Catholic cardinal

His Eminence Bonviso Bonvisi
- Cardinal-Priest of San Biagio dell'Anello; Archbishop of Bari-Canosa
- Church: Catholic Church

Orders
- Consecration: 21 April 1602 by Pope Clement VIII

Personal details
- Born: 27 July 1551 Lucca, Italy
- Died: 1 September 1603 (age 52)

Bonviso Bonvisi (1551–1603) was a Roman Catholic cardinal.

== Biography ==
Born into a patrician family from Lucca, Buonviso Buonvisi was born in Lucca in 1551. He studied law and went to Rome, where he became a cleric of the Apostolic Camera.

On 21 April 1602, he was consecrated bishop by Pope Clement VIII, with Camillo Borghese, Cardinal-Priest of Santi Giovanni e Paolo al Celio, and Alfonso Visconti, Bishop of Spoleto, serving as co-consecrators.

He died in Bari in 1603, at the age of 52.

Catholic Church titles
Preceded by Ascanio Colonna	Cardinal-Deacon of Santi Vito, Modesto e Crescenzia; 1599	Succeeded by Lelio Biscia
Preceded by Fernando Niño de Guevara	Cardinal-Priest of San Biagio dell'Anello; 1599–1602	Succeeded by Girolamo Pamphilj
Preceded by Giulio Cesare Riccardi	Archbishop of Bari-Canosa; 1602–1603	Succeeded by Galeazzo Sanvitale
