= Robert de Lenoncourt (archbishop of Reims) =

French prelate

The Most Reverend Robert de Lénoncourt
- Archbishop of Reims
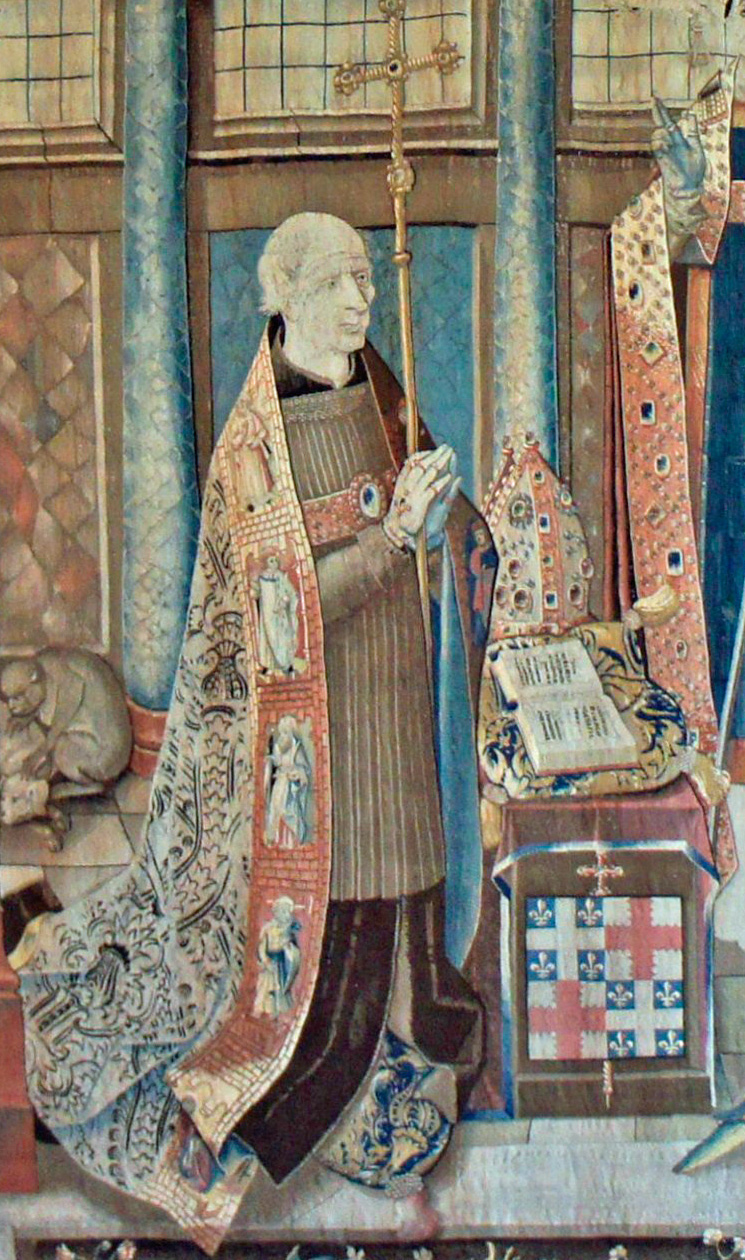
- Church: Roman Catholic
- Archdiocese: Archdiocese of Reims
- Appointed: 28 March 1509
- Term ended: 25 September 1532
- Predecessor: Carlo Domenico del Carretto
- Successor: Jean de Lorraine

Personal details
- Died: 25 September 1532

Robert I de Lenoncourt, le père des pauvres, died 25 September 1532, was a French prelate of the turn of the 16th century, known in his day for his works of charity among the poor of Reims.

== Biography ==
Robert, was the son of Henri (died 1477), lord of Lenoncourt and Jacquette de Baudricourt (died 1493), is a descendant of a noble family of Lorraine who has distinguished himself in the ecclesiastical career. He is the uncle of Cardinal Robert de Lenoncourt and the great-uncle of Cardinal Philippe de Lenoncourt.

Abbot commendatory of Tournus, prior of Saint-Pourcain (in the diocese of Moulins, in 1501 and 1509), Lenoncout was named to the archdiocese of Tours on 21 July 1484 that permutes for that of Reims on 7 April 1508.

As archbishop of Reims, he rebuilt the portal of the Saint-Remi basilica and decorated it with ten tapestries representing the life of the prelate. On 25 January 1515 he crowned King Francis I in the Cathedral of Reims. He was known for his charitable works in his church, feeding, for example, every day three hundred poor people during a famine in Champagne in 1520.
