= San Biagio dell'Anello =

Titular church in Rome, Italy

San Biagio dell'Anello (Titulus Sancti Blasii de Anello seu de Anulo) was a titular church in Rome, dedicated to Saint Blaise.

It is the national church in Rome of Armenia.

== Cardinal-priests ==
- Ippolito de' Rossi (1587–1591)
- Guido Pepoli (1595–1596)
- Fernando Niño de Guevara (1597–1599)
- Bonviso Bonvisi (1599–1603)
- Girolamo Pamphilj (1604–1610)
- Orazio Spínola (1616)
- Title suppressed in 1616
