= Cervione Cathedral =

Cathedral in Cervione, France

Coordinates: 42°19′53″N 9°29′30″E

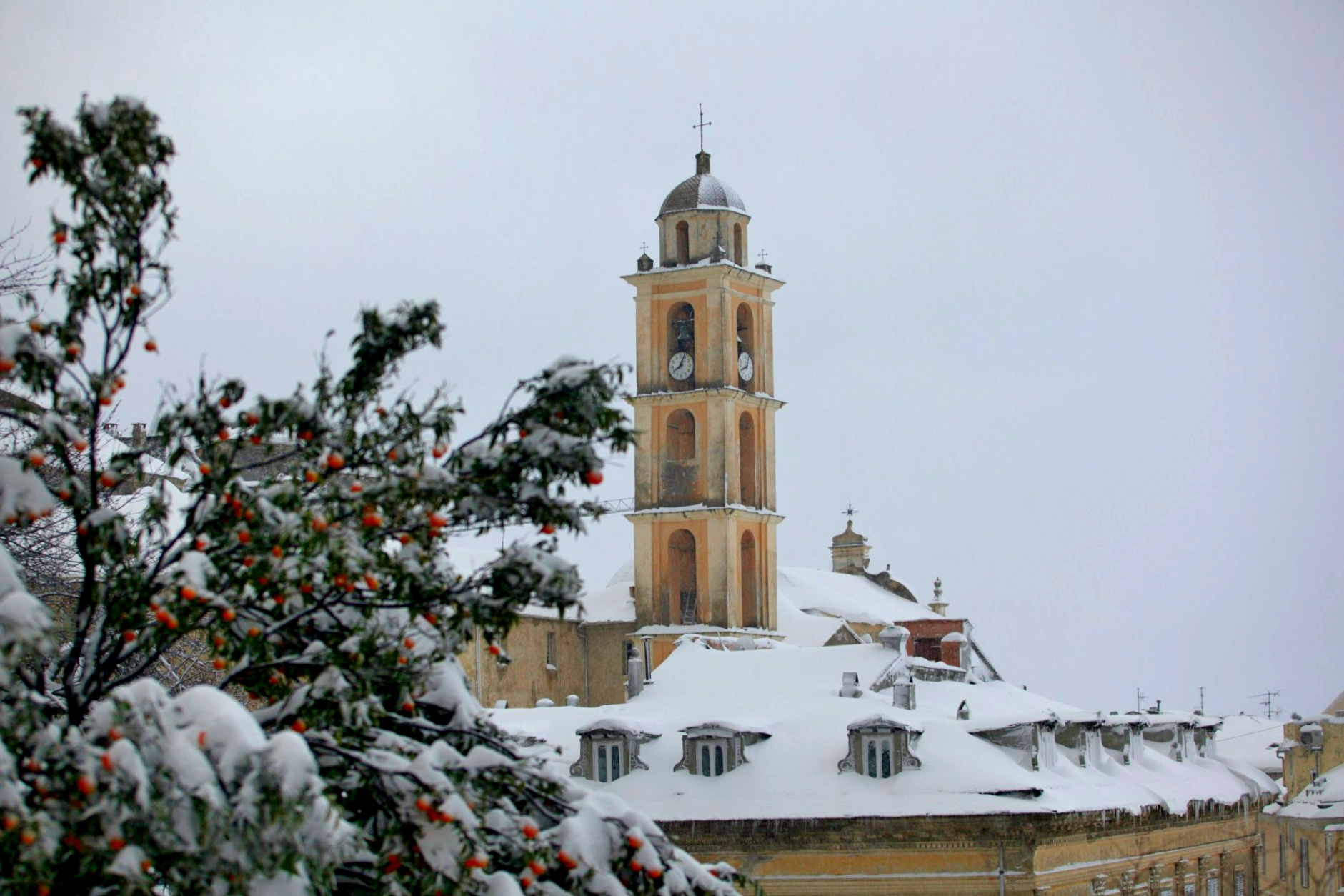
The Church in 2012

Cervione Cathedral (French: Pro-cathédrale Saint-Erasme de Cervione) is a former Roman Catholic cathedral in Cervione on the island of Corsica, and a national monument of France. It was the seat of the Bishop of Aleria until 1801, when all Corsican sees were merged into the Bishopric of Ajaccio.

== Sources and external links ==
- Catholic Encyclopedia: Corsica
- Location
