= Ascanio Colonna =

Italian Catholic cardinal (1560–1608)

His Eminence Ascanio Colonna
- Cardinal-Bishop of Palestrina
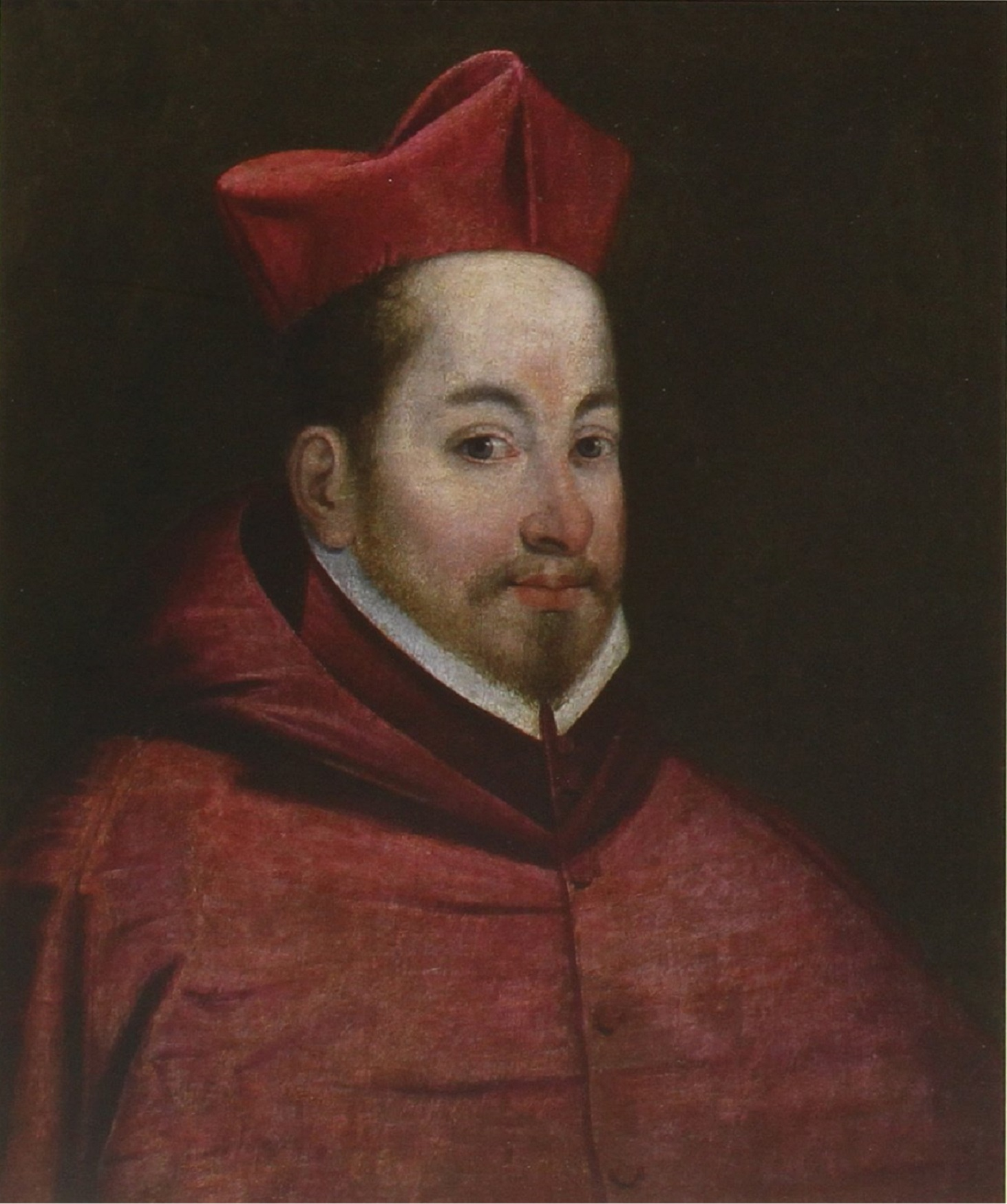
- Ascanio Colonna
- Church: Catholic Church
- Predecessor: Agostino Valier
- Successor: Antonio Maria Gallo

Orders
- Consecration: 11 June 1606 by Pope Paul V
- Created cardinal: 16 November 1586 by Pope Sixtus V
- Rank: Cardinal Deacon (1586 - 1606) Cardinal Bishop (1606 - 1608)

Personal details
- Born: 3 April 1560
- Died: 17 May 1608 (age 48) Rome, Italy

Ascanio Colonna (April 3, 1560 – May 17, 1608) was an Italian Cardinal who in his lifetime enjoyed a reputation for eloquence and learning.

== Life ==
Colonna was born in Marino on 27 April 1560, the son of Marcantonio Colonna (who commanded the papal flagship at the Battle of Lepanto) and Felice Orsini. He was educated at the University of Alcala and the University of Salamanca, graduating Doctor of both laws.

In 1581, while studying in Spain, he delivered an oration in commemoration of Anna of Austria, Queen of Spain, printed in Salamanca as Oratio in serenissimae Annae Austriacae Hispanarum et Indiarum reginae funere.

On 16 November 1586, he was appointed a cardinal deacon of Santi Vito, Modesto e Crescenzia by Pope Sixtus V, arriving in Rome 17 February 1587. On 14 January 1591, his titular church was altered to Santa Maria in Cosmedin and he was appointed to the Congregation of the Index.

At the death of Philip II of Spain, he delivered an Oratio in funere Philippi II, published in Rome in 1599. He was appointed cardinal protector of Flanders, and in 1605, he employed the Fleming Philip Rubens as his secretary and librarian.

In January 1606, he became cardinal priest of Santa Croce in Gerusalemme, and in June cardinal bishop of Palestrina and cardinal protector of the Kingdom of Naples. In the same year, he intervened in the controversy surrounding the Venetian Interdict with a censure published as Sententia contra reipublicae Venetae episcopos. On 11 June 1606, he was consecrated bishop by Pope Paul V, with Ottavio Bandini, Cardinal-Priest of Santa Sabina, and Carlo Conti, Bishop of Ancona e Numana, serving as co-consecrators.

In failing health, he made his will on 14 June 1607. He died in Rome on 17 May 1608, and was buried in the Lateran Basilica. He was survived by a natural son, Marino. In 1611 his personal library was sold to Giovanni Angelo Altemps.

Catholic Church titles
Preceded by Guido Luca Ferrero	Cardinal-Deacon of Santi Vito, Modesto e Crescenzia; 1587–1588	Succeeded by Bonviso Bonvisi
Preceded by Francesco Sforza	Cardinal-Deacon of San Nicola in Carcere; 1588–1591	Succeeded by Federico Borromeo (seniore)
Preceded by Benedetto Giustiniani	Cardinal-Deacon of Santa Maria in Cosmedin; 1591–1599	Succeeded by Giovanni Battista Deti
Preceded by Mark Sittich von Hohenems	Archpriest of the Arcibasilica di San Giovanni in Laterano; 1595–1608	Succeeded by Scipione Caffarelli-Borghese
Preceded by Enrico Caetani	Cardinal-Priest of Santa Pudenziana; 1599–1606	Succeeded by Innocenzo Del Bufalo-Cancellieri
Preceded by Francisco de Ávila Guzmán	Cardinal-Priest of Santa Croce in Gerusalemme; 1606	Succeeded by Antonio Zapata y Cisneros
Preceded by Agostino Valier	Cardinal-Bishop of Palestrina; 1606–1608	Succeeded by Antonio Maria Gallo
