= Cervione =

- Commune
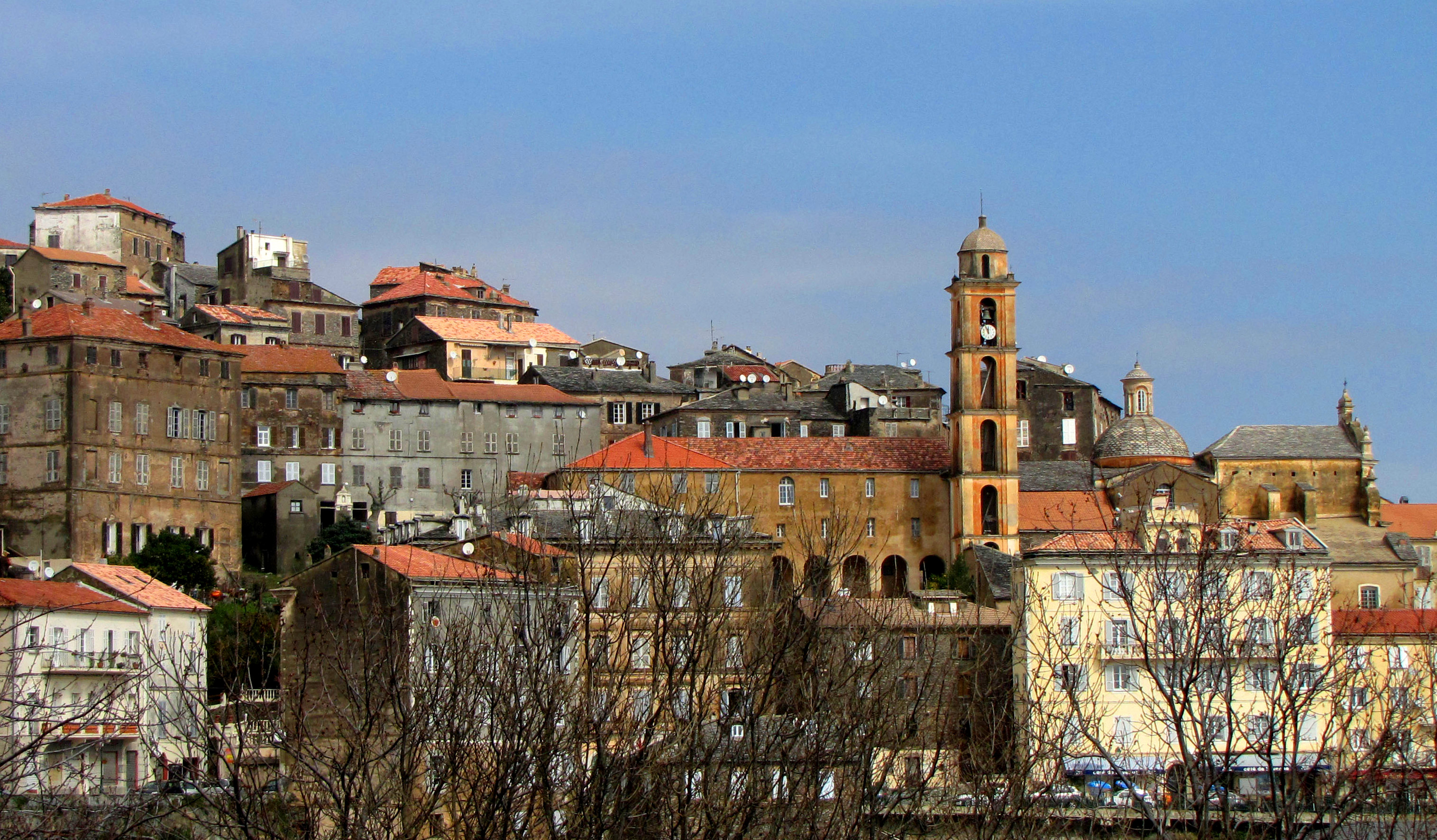
- View of Cervione with Cervione Cathedral.

- Coat of arms
- Location of Cervione
- Location within France Location within Corsica
- Coordinates: 42°19′57″N 9°29′32″E
- Country: France
- Region: Corsica
- Department: Haute-Corse
- Arrondissement: Corte
- Canton: Castagniccia
- Intercommunality: Costa Verde

Government
  - Mayor (2020–2026): Marc-Antoine Nicolaï
- Area^{1}: 11.45 km^{2} (4.42 sq mi)
- Elevation: 380 m (1,250 ft)
- Highest elevation: 934 m (3,064 ft)
- Lowest elevation: 0 m (0 ft)
- Population (2023): 2,149
  - Density: 187.7/km^{2} (486.1/sq mi)
- Time zone: UTC+01:00 (CET)
  - Summer (DST): UTC+02:00 (CEST)
- INSEE/Postal code: 2B087 /20221
- ^{1} French Land Register data, which excludes lakes, ponds, glaciers > 1 km^{2} (0.386 sq mi or 247 acres) and river estuaries.

Cervione (French pronunciation: [tʃɛʁvjɔne]; Corsican: Cervioni) is a commune of the Haute-Corse department of France on the island of Corsica. It is home to the Saint Erasmus cathedral, which was completed in 1745, and is an example of the baroque style.

== Geography ==
The town of Cervione is located to the east of Corsica island. It is the main ancient core of population between Bastia and Aleria which are the two most populated closer city. It dominate the oriental plain at the place where it is narrowest.

Cervione's hinterland is the Castaniccia a wet region with a lot of ancient villages and hamlets in the slot of Monte San Petrone (1767) the highest top of the shist part of Corsica (the quart of the north east of the island).

== Population ==
Historical population
Year	Pop.	±% p.a.
1968	1,400	—
1975	1,450	+0.50%
1982	1,254	−2.05%
1990	1,334	+0.78%
1999	1,452	+0.95%
2007	1,628	+1.44%
2012	1,719	+1.09%
2017	2,189	+4.95%
2023	2,149	−0.31%
Source: INSEE

== See also ==
- Communes of the Haute-Corse department
