= Costanzo de Sarnano =

16th-century Catholic cardinal

His Eminence Costanzo de Sarnano
- Cardinal-Priest of San Pietro in Montorio
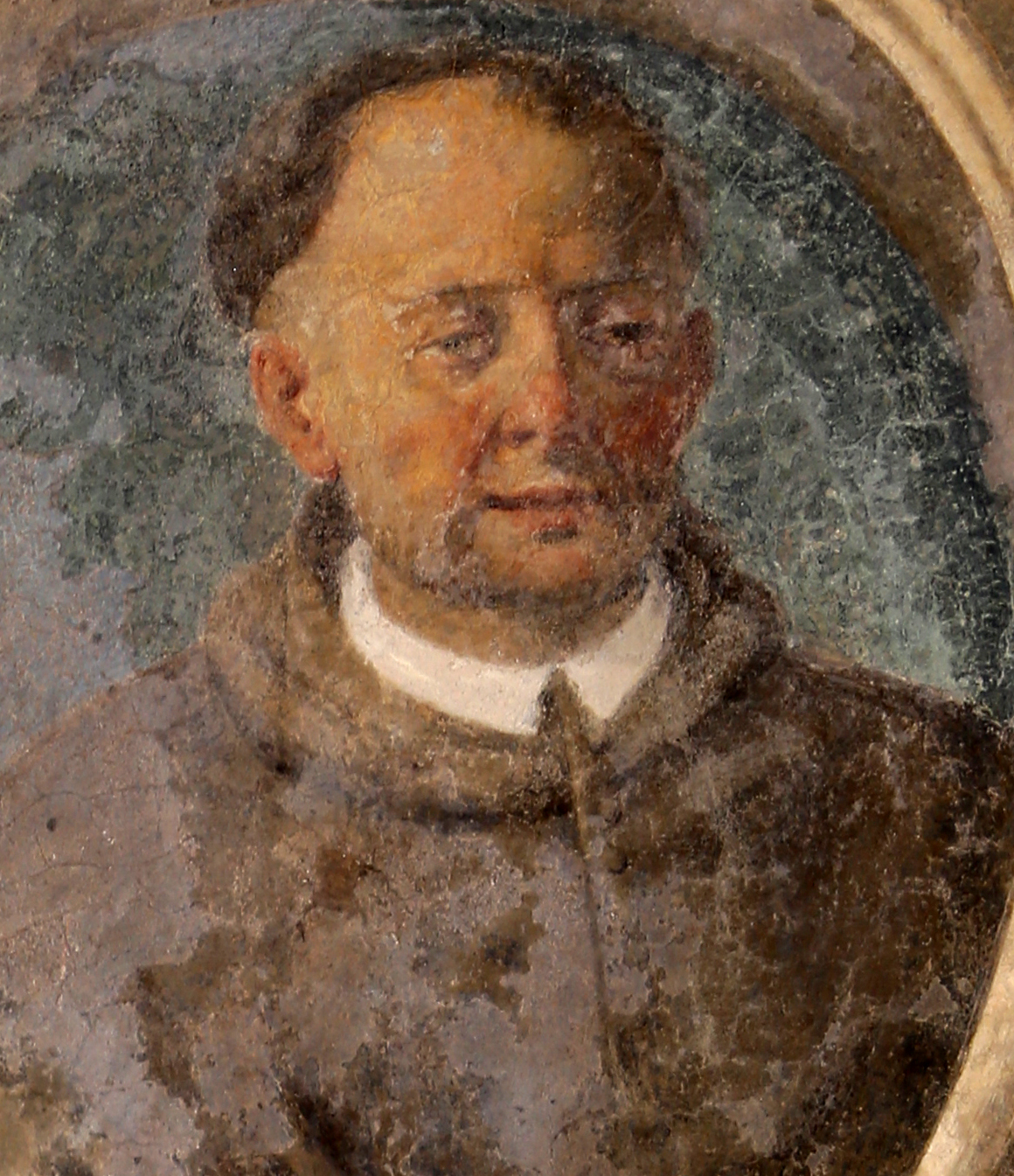
- Church: Catholic Church

Orders
- Consecration: 12 Jul 1587 by Girolamo Bernerio

Personal details
- Born: 4 Oct 1531 Sarnano, Italy
- Died: 20 Dec 1595 (age 64) Rome, Italy

Costanzo de Sarnano, O.F.M. Conv. or Gasparo Torri (1531–1595) was a Roman Catholic cardinal.

== Biography ==
Born on 4 October 1531 in Sarnano, March of Ancona, he entered the Order of Friars Minor Conventual when he was ten years old; he changed his baptismal name, Gasparo, to Costanzo. He studied philosophy and theology and obtained the title of Magister when he was twenty-eight years old.

He taught philosophy and theology at the Universities of Perugia, Padua and Rome. At the same time, he was also a noted and popular preacher. He was a friend of Fr. Felice Peretti, also a Franciscan, who later became Pope Sixtus V. He wrote several works in theology and Aristotelian philosophy; his Summa theologica was published by the Vatican Press in 1592.

Torri was created cardinal priest in the Papal consistory of 16 November 1586 and received the red hat and the title of San Vitale on 14 January 1587. He opted for the title of San Pietro in Montorio on 20 April 1587. Torri was charged by the pope with the critical edition of the works of Bonaventure.

On 12 July 1587, he was consecrated bishop by Girolamo Bernerio, Bishop of Ascoli Piceno, with Giovanni Battista Albani, Titular Patriarch of Alexandria, and Agostino Quinzio, bishop of Korčula, serving as co-consecrators.

Torri didn't reside in his see because he was retained in Rome working for the Roman Curia. He resigned the government of the diocese before 29 May 1589. He participated in the first conclave of 1590, which elected Pope Urban VII, in the second conclave of 1590, which elected Pope Gregory XIV, in the 1591 papal conclave, which elected Pope Innocent IV and in the 1592 papal conclave, which elected Pope Clement VIII.

Torri died on 20 December 1595 in Rome. He is buried in the Conventual church of S. Francesco in his native Sarnano.

== Episcopal succession ==
Episcopal succession of Costanzo de Sarnano

While bishop, he was the principal consecrator of:

- Giovanni Evangelista Pallotta, Archbishop of Cosenza (1587);
- Cesare Bellocchio, Bishop of Telese o Cerreto Sannita (1587);
- Girolamo Bevilacqua, Titular Archbishop of Nazareth (1587);
- Giovanni Battista Potentia, Titular Bishop of Tiberias and Coadjutor Archbishop of Amalfi (1589); and
- Jérôme de Langue, Bishop of Couserans (1593).

Catholic Church titles
Preceded by Pierdonato Cesi (seniore)	Cardinal-Priest of San Vitale; 1587	Succeeded by Antonmaria Sauli
Preceded by Giovanni Francesco Bonomi	Bishop of Vercelli; 1587–1589	Succeeded by Corrado Asinari
Preceded by	Cardinal-Priest of San Pietro in Montorio; 1587–1589	Succeeded by Guido Pepoli
