= Guido Pepoli =

Guido Pepoli (May 6, 1560 – June 1599) was an Italian cardinal. He was ordained by Pope Sixtus V on December 20, 1589 and held office of Treasurer of His Holiness. From January 15, 1590 to February 6, 1592 he was Cardinal-Deacon of Sts. Cosmas and Damian, in Rome, and, later, Cardinal-Deacon of Sant'Eustachio, in Rome, until January 8, 1596. Then, succeeding to Cardinal Costanzo da Sarnano, he was ordained Cardinal-Priest of S. Pietro in Montorio, in Rome, until he died, in June 1599, at 39 years old.

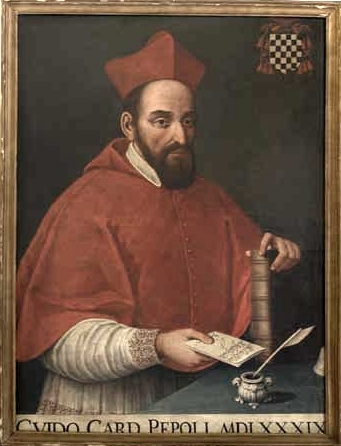
Guido Pepoli

Catholic Church titles
Preceded by Federico Borromeo (seniore)	Cardinal-Deacon of Santi Cosma e Damiano; 1590–1592	Succeeded by Flaminio Piatti
Preceded by Girolamo Mattei	Cardinal-Deacon of Sant'Eustachio; 1592–1595	Succeeded by Odoardo Farnese
Preceded by Ippolito de' Rossi	Cardinal-Priest of San Biagio dell'Anello; 1595–1596	Succeeded by Fernando Niño de Guevara
Preceded by Costanzo de Sarnano	Cardinal-Priest of San Pietro in Montorio; 1596–1599	Succeeded by Domenico Toschi
