= Philippe de Lenoncourt =

French cardinal

Philippe (IV) de Lenoncourt (born 1527 in the Coupvray Castle; died on 13 December 1592 in Rome, Papal States) was a French cardinal of the Catholic Church.

== Biography ==
Philippe de Lenoncourt was elected bishop of Châlons in 1550 as the successor to his uncle Robert de Lenoncourt. He was commendatory abbot of Saint-Martin of Épernay, Rabais and Oigny. In 1560 he was transferred to the diocese of Auxerre. His family was an ally of the Dinteville, of whom two members, namely François de Dinteville (1513–1530) and François de Dinteville II (1530–1554) had preceded Robert de Lenoncourt to the bishopric of Auxerre. On 31 December 1578 he was made a Knight of the Order of the Holy Spirit.

He was created a cardinal by Pope Sixtus V during the 16 November 1586 consistory. He was prefect of the Congregation of the Index in 1588.

Cardinal Lenoncourt took part to the conclaves of 1590 (election of Popes Urban VII and Gregory XIV), 1591 (election of Pope Innocent IV) and 1592 (election of Pope Clement VII).

== See also ==
- Cardinals created by Sixtus V
- List of the Knights of the Order of the Holy Spirit

== Bibliography ==
- Popoff, Michel; Pinoteau, Hervé (preface) (1996). Armorial de l'Ordre du Saint-Esprit : d'après l'œuvre du père Anselme et ses continuateurs (in French). Paris: Le Léopard d'or. ISBN 2-86377-140-X.

Catholic Church titles
Preceded by Robert de Lenoncourt	Bishop-Count of Châlons and peer of France; 1550–1556	Succeeded by Jérôme Burgensis
Preceded by Robert de Lenoncourt	Bishop of Auxerre; 1560 – 1563	Succeeded by Philibert Babou de La Bourdaisière
Preceded by Philibert Babou de La Bourdaisière	Commendatory abbot of Saint-Jean-de-Réome; 1570 – 1592	Succeeded by Guillaume Fouquet de La Varenne
Preceded by Ludovico Madruzzo	Cardinal priest of S. Onofrio; 15 January 1588 – 1592	Succeeded by Filippo Sega
