= Ippolito de' Rossi =

16th-century Catholic cardinal

His Eminence Ippolito de' Rossi
- Cardinal-Deacon of San Biagio dell’Anello; Bishop of Pavia
- Church: Catholic Church

Personal details
- Born: 31 October 1531 San Secondo Parmense, Italy
- Died: 28 April 1591 (age 59) Rome, Italy

Ippolito de' Rossi (1531–1591) was a Roman Catholic cardinal and bishop of Pavia, remembered for his contributions to ecclesiastical life and his patronage of significant architectural projects in Pavia.

== Early life and ecclesiastical career ==
Born in San Secondo Parmense, Italy, Ippolito de' Rossi was part of the noble Rossi family, known for its influence in the Duchy of Parma. His family’s connections allowed him to pursue an ecclesiastical career, receiving education and spiritual training appropriate for someone of his social standing.

== Bishop of Pavia ==
Ippolito de' Rossi was appointed Bishop of Pavia in 1564, succeeding his relative Giovanni Girolamo de' Rossi. His tenure as bishop lasted until his death in 1591. During his time as bishop, he played a key role in the construction of the new episcopal palace (Palazzo Vescovile), which was built to replace the previous bishop's residence. The new palace was erected on the site of the former Monastery of Santa Maria delle Stuoie. The design of the building was entrusted to Pellegrino Tibaldi, a prominent architect who was also responsible for the construction of the Collegio Borromeo in Pavia during the same period.

The Palazzo Vescovile became a landmark of Mannerist and Baroque architecture. Its distinctive features include a double courtyard, frescoed rooms with decorative grotesques, and a grand staircase designed by Tibaldi. One of the most notable rooms was the bishop's private chapel, which was later adorned with frescoes by the painter Felice Biella in 1737.

Interestingly, the "studiolo" (small study) in the palace is decorated with grotesque motifs that include depictions of two Japanese figures, which might symbolize the visit of Japanese emissaries to the bishop. This reflects the broader historical context of Catholic missionary efforts in Asia at the time.

== Cardinalate ==
Ippolito de' Rossi was made a cardinal-deacon by Pope Sixtus V in 1585. He first held the title of Cardinal-Deacon of Santa Maria in Portico (1586–1587) before becoming Cardinal-Deacon of San Biagio dell'Anello (1587–1591).

== Episcopal succession ==
He was the principal co-consecrator of Saint Alessandro Maria Sauli, Bishop of Aleria (1570).

== Death ==
Ippolito de' Rossi died on 28 April 1591 in Rome, Italy, at the age of 59. His remains were interred in San Biagio dell'Anello, the church associated with his title as cardinal-deacon.

Catholic Church titles
Preceded by Pietro Francesco de Nobilibus	Titular Bishop of Chunavia; 1560–1564	Succeeded by Joseph Brendan Houlihan
Preceded by Giovanni Girolamo de' Rossi	Bishop of Pavia; 1564–1591	Succeeded by Alessandro Maria Sauli
Preceded by Francesco Alciati	Cardinal-Deacon of Santa Maria in Portico; 1586–1587	Succeeded by Hughes de Loubenx de Verdalle
Preceded by	Cardinal-Deacon of San Biagio dell'Anello; 1587–1591	Succeeded by Guido Pepoli
