= Enrico Caetani =

Catholic cardinal

His Eminence Enrico Caetani
- Camerlengo of the Holy Roman Church
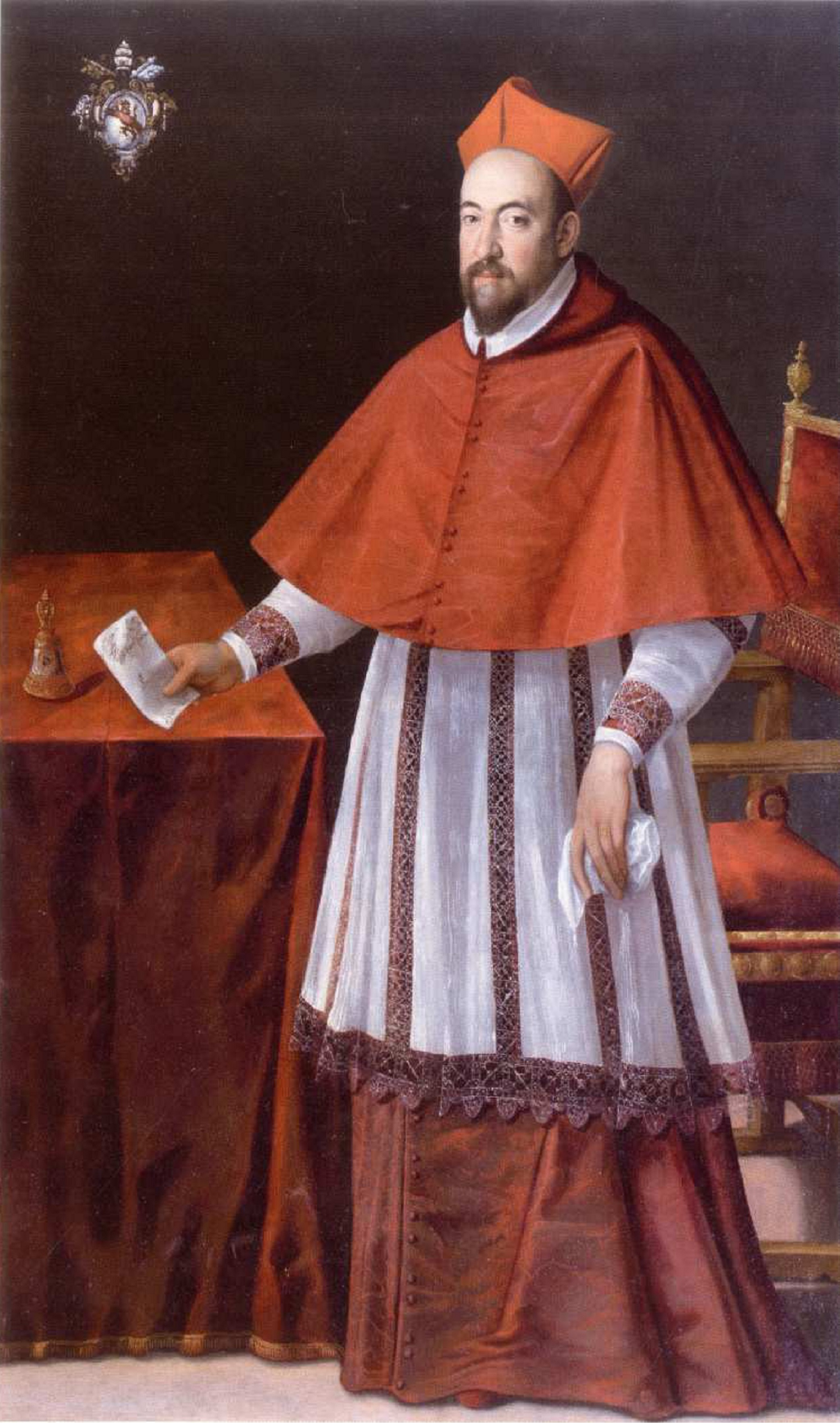
- Portrait by Scipione Pulzone
- Church: Catholic Church
- Appointed: 26 October 1587
- Term ended: 13 December 1599
- Predecessor: Filippo Guastavillani
- Successor: Pietro Aldobrandini
- Other posts: Cardinal-Priest of Santa Pudenziana (1586-1599)
- Previous posts: Latin Patriarch of Alexandria (1566–1589)

Orders
- Consecration: 11 Aug 1585 by Giulio Antonio Santorio
- Created cardinal: 8 December 1585 by Pope Sixtus V
- Rank: Cardinal-Priest

Personal details
- Born: 6 August 1550 Sermoneta, Papal States
- Died: 13 December 1599 (aged 49) Rome, Papal States

Enrico Caetani (6 August 1550 – 13 December 1599) was an Italian cardinal.

== Early life ==
He was born at Sermoneta, in the Papal States, as the second son of Bonifacio, lord of Sermoneta, and Caterina di Alberto Pio, daughter of the lord of Carpi. He was the nephew of Cardinal Niccolò Caetani, and brother of Camillo Caetani.

On 11 Aug 1585, he was consecrated bishop by Giulio Antonio Santorio, Cardinal-Priest of San Bartolomeo all'Isola, with Massimiliano Palumbara, Archbishop of Benevento, Annibale de Capua, Archbishop of Naples, and Guillaume Damasi Van der Linden, Bishop of Roermond, serving as co-consecrators.

Pope Sixtus V gave him the title of cardinal on 18 December 1585. In the same year he was appointed as Latin Patriarch of Alexandria, a position he held until 1587. In 1585 to 1587 he was legate in Bologna, and recommended Galileo Galilei to the university there in 1588. The chair, however, went to Giovanni Antonio Magini.

== Diplomat in France ==
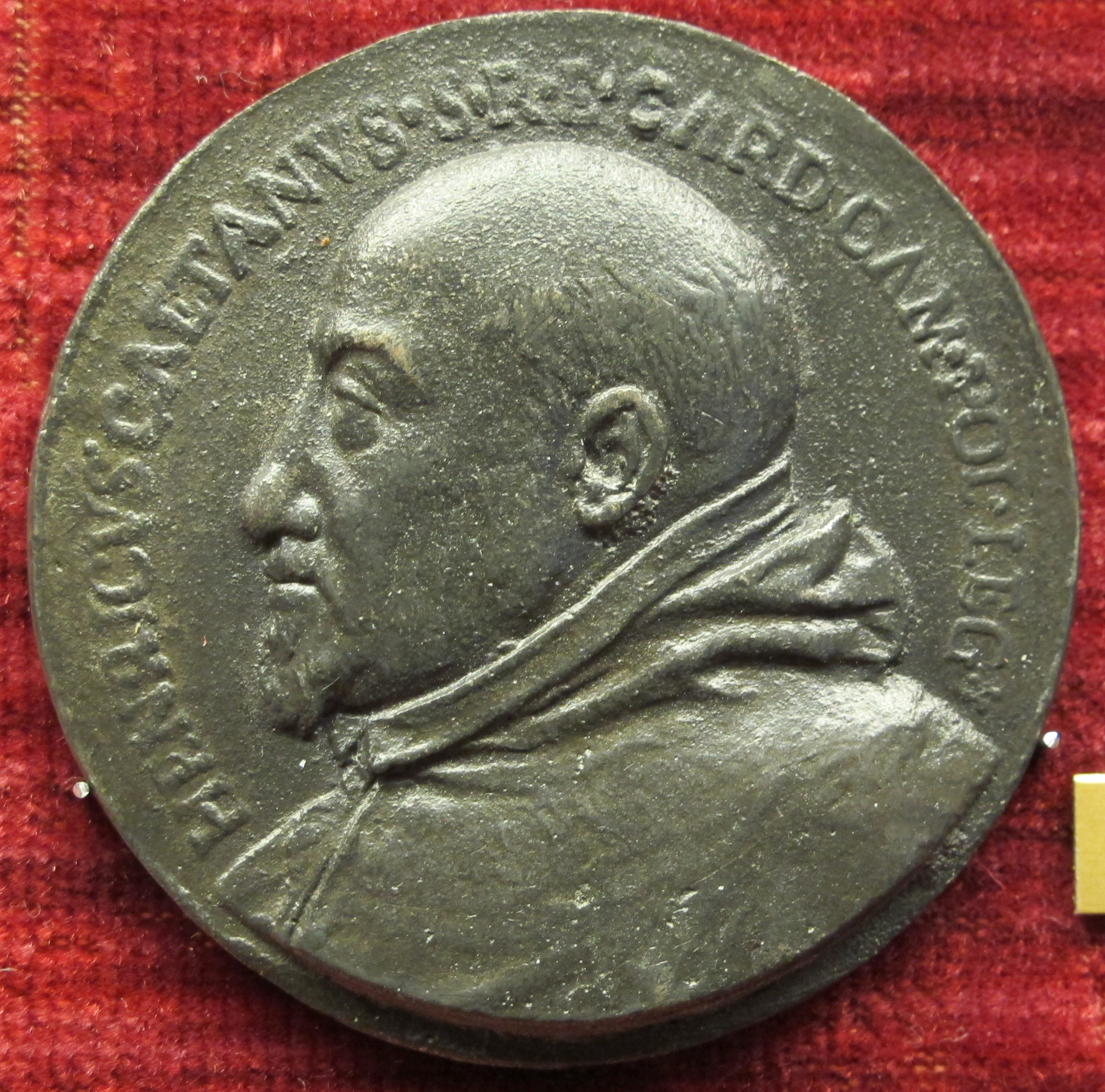
Medal

In 1589 Caetani led the papal diplomatic mission to France sent to defend the Catholic church position during the French wars of religion. He was accompanied by Lorenzo Bianchetti, Robert Bellarmine and others in a strong delegation. Caetani supported the Catholic League and the Spanish interest against Henry of Navarre. In March 1590 he presided over a ceremony in which militia and city officials took an oath to defend Paris against Henry. He blessed in May the monastic forces raised by Guillaume Rose for the defence. He was a defender during the Siege of Paris that year, spending heavily.

== Later life ==
After the death of William Allen in 1594, there was no generally acceptable candidate as successor, to lead the English mission. Caetani took on the role of Cardinal Protector. He then appointed George Blackwell as archpriest for England. He served as legate a latere in Poland from 3 April 1596 until 23 June 1597.

He died in Rome in 1599.

Catholic Church titles
Preceded by Alessandro Riario	Titular Patriarch of Alexandria; 1585–1586	Succeeded by Giovanni Battista Albani
Preceded by Claude de La Baume	Cardinal-Priest of Santa Pudenziana; 1586–1599	Succeeded by Ascanio Colonna
Preceded by Filippo Guastavillani	Camerlengo of the Apostolic Chamber; 1587–1599	Succeeded by Pietro Aldobrandini
