= Robert de Lenoncourt =

French bishop, Cardinal and diplomat

His Eminence Robert de Lenoncourt
- Cardinal, Archbishop of Arles
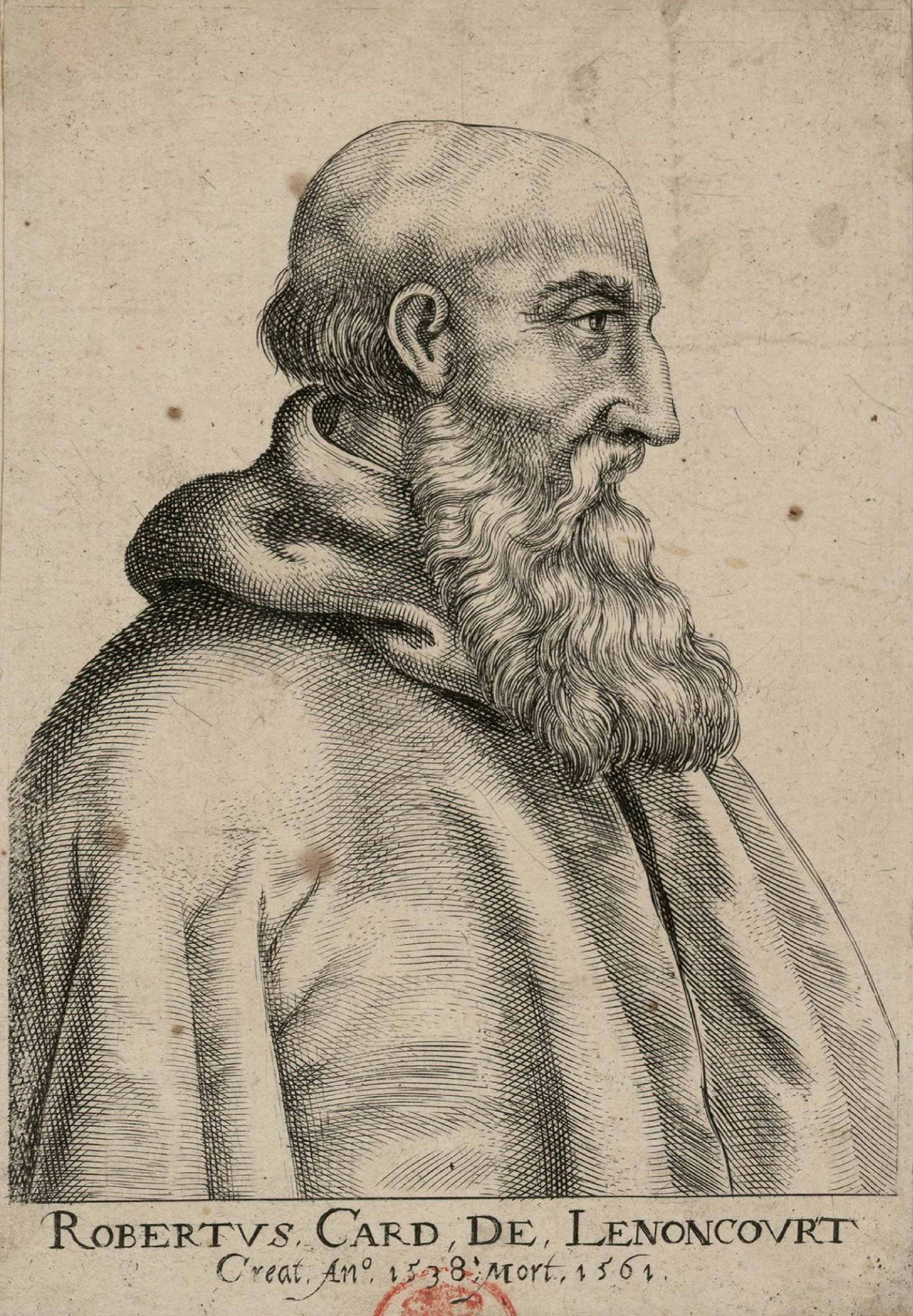
- Church: Roman Catholic Church
- Archdiocese: Arles
- Appointed: 7 February 1560
- Term ended: 4 February 1561
- Predecessor: Jacques du Broullat
- Successor: Antoine de Albon
- Other posts: Cardinal-Bishop of Sabina (1560-1561)
- Previous posts: Archbishop of Embrun (1556-1560); Cardinal-Priest of Santa Cecilia in Trastevere (1555-1560); Cardinal-Priest of Sant'Apollinare (1547-1555); Cardinal-Priest of Sant'Anastasia (1540-1547); Bishop of Châlons-sur-Marne (1535-1550)

Orders
- Created cardinal: 20 December 1538 by Pope Paul III
- Rank: Cardinal-Bishop

Personal details
- Born: 1485 ?
- Died: 4 February 1561 (aged 75-76) La Charité-sur-Loire
- Buried: Prieure de La Charité-sur-Loire
- Parents: Thierry de Lenoncourt; Jeanne de Ville
- Education: Licenciate in canon and civil law

Robert de Lenoncourt (1485? – 4 February 1561) was a French bishop, archbishop, cardinal, and diplomat. He was the son of Thierry de Lenoncourt, Seigneur de Vignory, Councillor and Chamberlain of the King, and Jeanne de Ville. He had a brother, Henry, Sire de Lenoncourt and Baron of Vignory, a sister, Jacquette, who married Jean d'Aguerre, son of the Governor of Mouzon (January 1509), another sister, Nicole, who married Érard du Châtelet. Robert's paternal uncle, also called Robert de Lenoncourt, was Archbishop of Reims.

== Biography ==
From 1515 to 1536 Robert de Lenoncourt was prior of the monastery of S. Portianus (Pourçain) in the diocese of Clermont. In 1523 he was named abbot of the Abbey of S. Rémi in Reims. In 1537 he restored the tomb of Saint Rémi. In 1530 he was named Abbot of the royal abbey of Tournus, making his formal entry on 4 June 1531. He was also a Protonotary Apostolic and Almoner to the King and Queen of Navarre, Henry II and Marguerite of Angoulême, the sister of King Francis I of France. Lenoncourt was Treasurer of the Church of Reims, and held a license in utroque iure (both Civil Law and Canon Law).

Lenoncourt was apparently Vicar-General of the diocese of Reims, during the episcopacy of Cardinal Jean de Guise-Lorraine (1532-1538).

=== Chalons ===
Lenoncourt was appointed Bishop of Châlons by Francis I in 1535, an appointment confirmed by Pope Paul III (Farnese) on 10 May 1535. He resigned the diocese in 1550, in favor of his nephew Philippe, though he continued to be Administrator of the Diocese of Châlons until Philippe's consecration; as part of the arrangement he retained the use of the house of the Bishops of Châlons in Paris. As Bishop of Châlons he was present among the Peers of France in the Lit de Justice of 15 January 1536 [1537], against the Emperor Charles V. Bishop de Lenoncourt was sent as Ambassador to the Emperor by Francis I, in the matter of the Duchy of Guelders which was a fief of the Holy Roman Empire, but which was in alliance with the French, thanks to a secret treaty of October 1534. The Duke of Guelders (1538-1543), William, Duke of Jülich-Cleves-Berg, married King Francis' niece, Jeanne d'Albret, in 1541.

=== Cardinal ===
Lenoncourt was created a Cardinal Priest in the Consistory of 20 December 1538 by Pope Paul III. He was admitted to Consistory and given his red hat on 19 March 1540, and on 7 October 1540 he was assigned the titulus of Santa Anastasia. On 10 October 1547 he was translated to the titulus of Sant'Apollinare, and on 11 December 1555 to Santa Cecilia in Trastevere.

In 1538, Robert de Lenoncourt was named Prior of the Prieuré de la Charité-sur-Loire, which he held until his death. The priory was burned during the Third War of Religion, and the inhabitants scattered. After some disorder, Cardinal Robert was succeeded by his nephew Philippe in 1564.

Cardinal de Lenoncourt was granted the Abbey of Saint-Martin de Laon in 1545 and held it until 1548, when he was succeeded by Cardinal Charles de Lorraine.

=== Metz ===
Cardinal de Lenoncourt was granted the diocese of Metz on 22 April 1551 by Pope Julius III, in succession to Cardinal Charles de Guise-Lorraine, which he held until December 1555. He was the first bishop of Metz in sixty-seven years to personally take up his charge. With the Treaty of Chambord in 1552, Metz became a part of France and remained so until 1871. King Henri II himself spent three days in Metz, receiving the fealty of his subjects, and then left the Duke de Guise, François de Guise-Lorraine, as his Lieutenant-General. In January 1552 Cardinal de Lenoncourt convoked a meeting of the Estates-General of Metz, but his actions appeared to the citizens to be an effort to concentrate all the power in the city in his own hands. Their strong reaction compelled the Cardinal to withdraw the Estates to the town of Vic, just east of Nancy. On 10 April he helped to introduce a French army into Metz. He was instrumental in overthrowing the republic which had existed under Charles V in favor of the French, manipulating the elections for the Council by naming candidates and choosing the Maître-Échevin (President) himself. Cardinal de Lenoncourt resumed the coinage of money in Metz, in his own name, in 1553. He then sent a memorandum to the King, in which he requested military assistance. The King sent Marshal de Vieilleville to garrison Metz and Vic, and the Marshal quickly took the entire territory under his control. Cardinal Robert lost everything for which he had been working, and went so far as to seek the aid of the Emperor in trying to eject the French garrison from Metz. In 1556 the citizens of Metz petitioned the King of France for relief from their bishop, but Lenoncourt, who had been in Rome for the second Conclave of 1555, had already been transferred to Embrun. It was perhaps the easiest way to solve the political and military problems created by an overzealous supporter of French interests and his own advantage.

=== Embrun, Auxerre ===
Lenoncourt was named Archbishop of Embrun by King Henri II of France, the appointment being approved by Pope Paul IV (Carafa) in Consistory on 23 March 1556. He held the post until the King appointed him to the diocese of Auxerre. Cardinal de Lenoncourt was approved by Pope Paul IV as bishop of Auxerre on 4 October 1556. Possession of the See was carried out by a procurator on 30 October 1556, and he never visited his diocese personally. One of his vicars was his nephew Philippe de Lenoncourt. His spiritual functions were carried out by Fr. Philippe Munier, Titular Bishop of Philadelphia In 1557 the Cardinal appointed his nephew, Jean de Lenoncourt, Abbot of Essômes, to represent him at a meeting of the Estates of Burgundy. He was succeeded by his nephew Philippe, who made his solemn entry into Auxerre on 8 December 1560, the splendid details of which were recorded and witnessed by a notary. Philippe was accompanied by his brother Jean, Baron de Vignory.

On the nomination of the King, Cardinal de Lenoncourt became Prince and Archbishop of Arles in 1560. His spiritual functions as archbishop were carried out by his suffragan and perpetual vicar, Pierre de Bisqueriis, titular bishop of Nicopolis. He was succeeded by Antoine d'Albon (1561-1562), and then by Cardinal Ippolito d'Este in 1564. On 3 July 1560, the archbishop, bishop, provost, canons and other clergy of the diocese of Arles were accused by the citizens of Arles in the Parliament of Provence of failing, despite more than sufficient revenues assigned for the purpose, to provide preachers for the churches in the diocese on Sundays, Feast Days, Advent and Lent and other major occasions. While the new archbishop had only received his bulls in February, he and his clergy were put on notice that the people were unhappy with the quality of service being provided.

Cardinal Robert de Lenoncourt participated in the Conclave of 5 September–25 December 1559 which resulted in the election of Cardinal Giovanni Angelo de' Medici, who took the throne name of Pope Pius IV. The French candidates, chosen by King Henri and Queen Catherine, were Cardinal Ippolito d'Este, Cardinal François de Tournon, and Cardinal Ercole Gonzaga of Mantua, none of whom was actually papabile.

On 13 March 1560 he was also created suburbicarian Bishop of Sabina.

=== Death ===
Cardinal Robert de Lenoncourt died in France, at his Priory of La Charité-sur-Loire, on 4 February 1561. His body was desecrated by the Huguenots, burned and the ashes scattered in the Loire.

== Bibliography ==
- Ribier, Guillaume (1666). Lettres et memoires d'estat, des Roys, Princes, Ambassadeurs et autres ministres sous les Regnes de François I., Henry II. et François II (in French). Vol. Tome premier. Paris: François Clouzier.
- Sainte-Marthe, Denis (1751). Gallia christiana in provincia ecclesiasticas distributa (in Latin). Vol. Tomus nonus (IX). Paris: Typographia Regia.
- Fisquet, Honoré Jean Pierre (1867). La France pontificale (Gallia christiana). Metropole d'Aix (in French). Vol. 20: Aix, Arles, Embrun (deuxième ed.). Paris: E. Repos. pp. 666–670.
- Joseph Hyacinthe; Ulysse Chevalier; Louis Fillet (1901). Gallia christiana novissima: Arles (in French and Latin). Valence: Soc. anonyme d'imprimerie montbéliardasie. pp. 911–915.
- Gulik, Guilelmus van; Konrad Eubel (1923). L. Schmitz-Kallenberg (ed.). Hierarchia catholica medii aevi (in Latin). Vol. III (editio altera ed.). Münster: sumptibus et typis librariae Regensbergianae.
- Michon, Cédric, "Cardinals at the Court of Francis I," Martin Heale, ed. (2014). The Prelate in England and Europe, 1300-1560. Woodbridge, Suffolk UK: Boydell & Brewer Ltd. pp. 76–98. ISBN 978-1-903153-58-1.
