= Cardinals created by Urban VIII =

Catholic appointments from 1623 to 1643

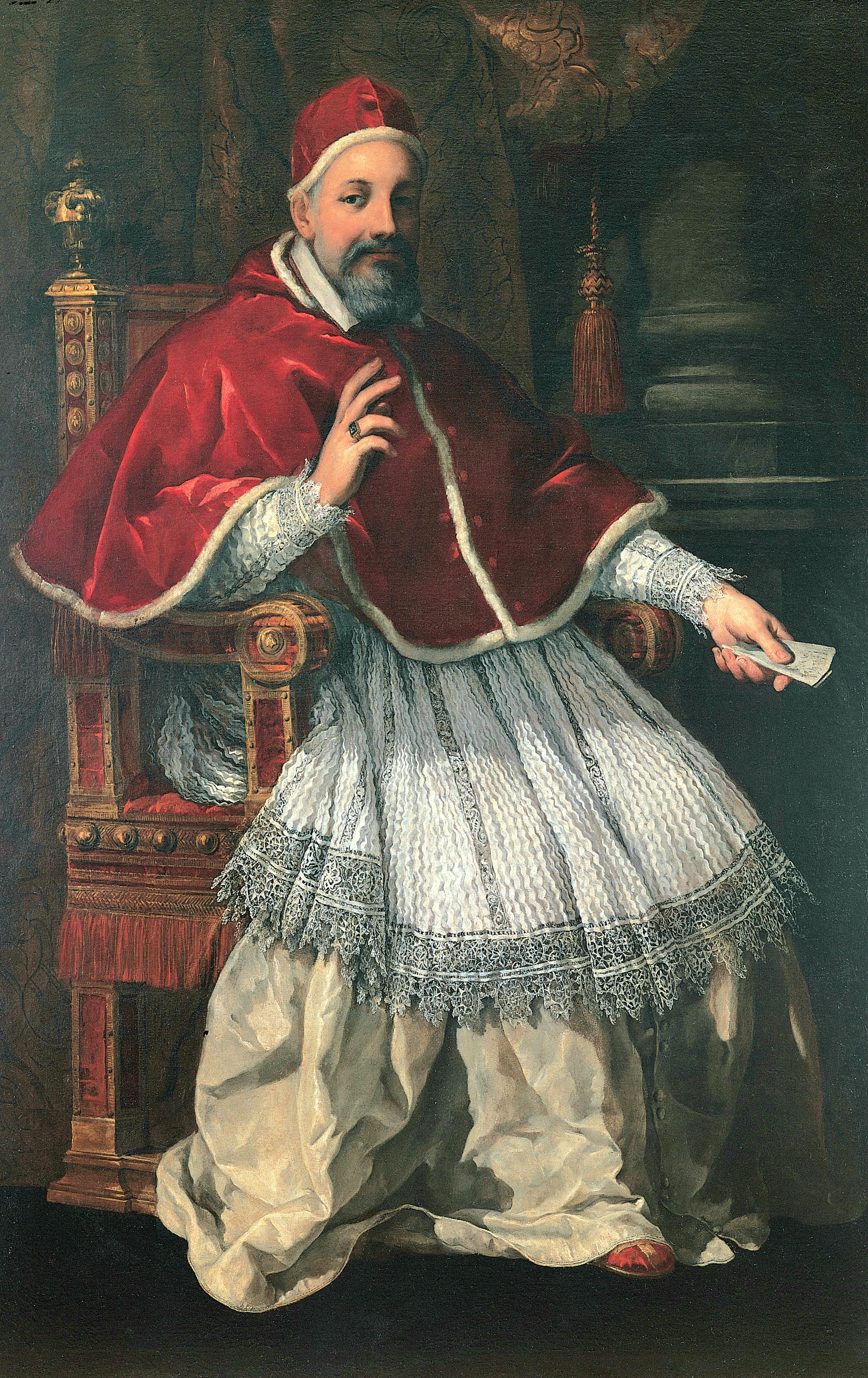
Pope Urban VIII (1568–1644)

Pope Urban VIII (r. 1623–1644) created seventy-four new cardinals in eight consistories.

== 2 October 1623 ==
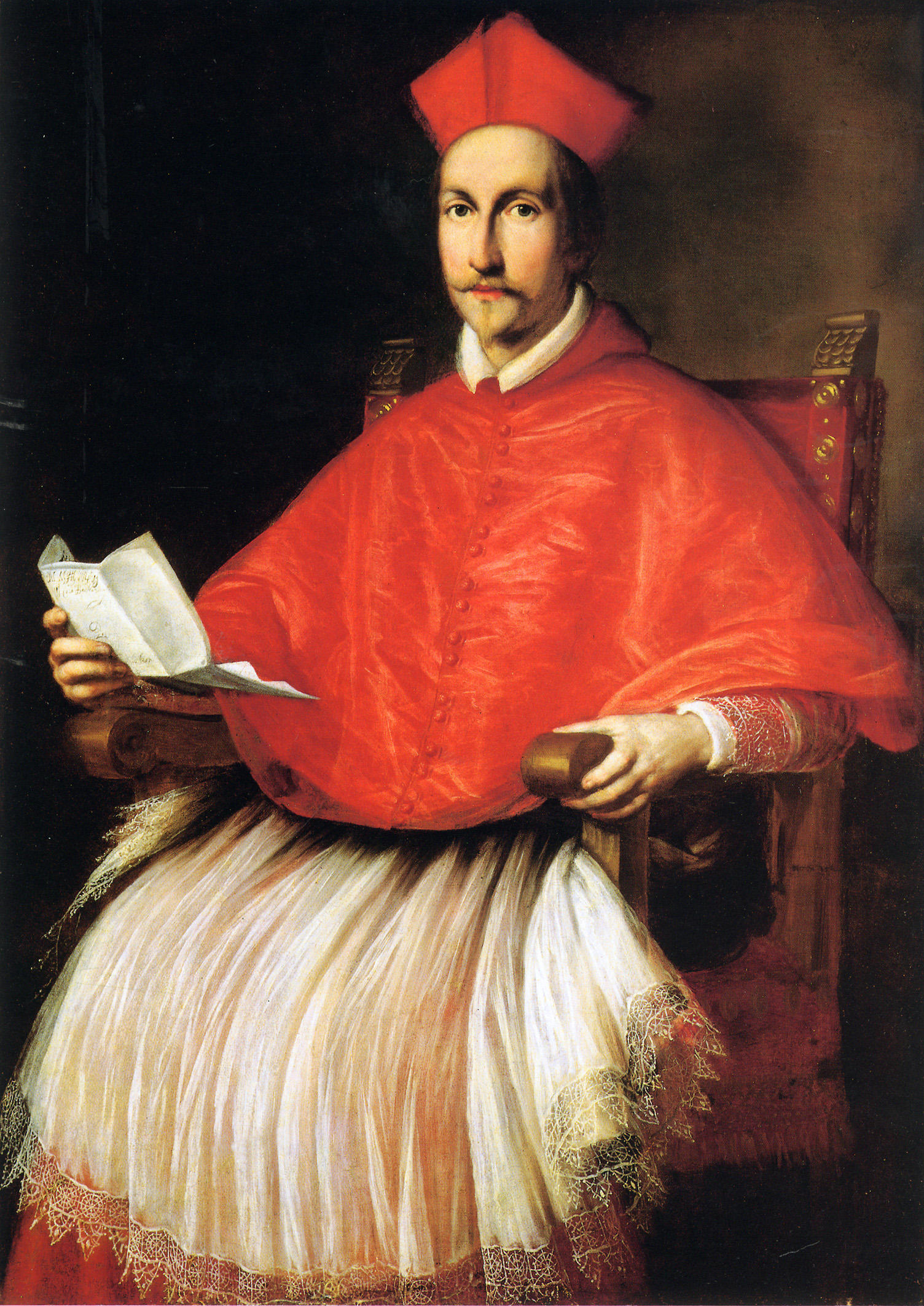
Francesco Barberini (1597–1679), made a cardinal on 2 October 1623.

1. Francesco Barberini, nephew of the Pope – cardinal-deacon of S. Onofrio (received the title on 20 November 1623), then cardinal-deacon of S. Agata in Suburra (13 November 1624), cardinal-deacon of S. Lorenzo in Damaso (24 November 1632), cardinal-priest of S. Lorenzo in Damaso (14 November 1644), cardinal-bishop of Sabina (23 October 1645), cardinal-bishop of Porto e S. Rufina (23 September 1652), cardinal-bishop of Ostia e Velletri (11 October 1666), † 10 December 1679

== 7 October 1624 ==
All the new cardinals received their titular churches on 13 November 1624

1. Antonio Marcello Barberini, O.F.M.Cap., brother of the Pope – cardinal-priest of S. Onofrio, then cardinal-priest of S. Pietro in Vincoli (7 September 1637), cardinal-priest of S. Maria in Trastevere (26 May 1642), † 11 September 1646
2. Lorenzo Magalotti, cousin of the Pope, secretary of state – cardinal-deacon of S. Maria in Aquiro, then cardinal-priest of S. Maria in Aquiro (16 December 1624), cardinal-priest of SS. Giovanni e Paolo (28 February 1628), † 19 September 1637
3. Pietro Maria Borghese – cardinal-deacon of S. Giorgio in Velabro, then cardinal-deacon of S. Maria in Cosmedin (24 August 1626), cardinal-deacon of S. Crisogono (19 December 1633), † 15 June 1642

== 19 January 1626 ==
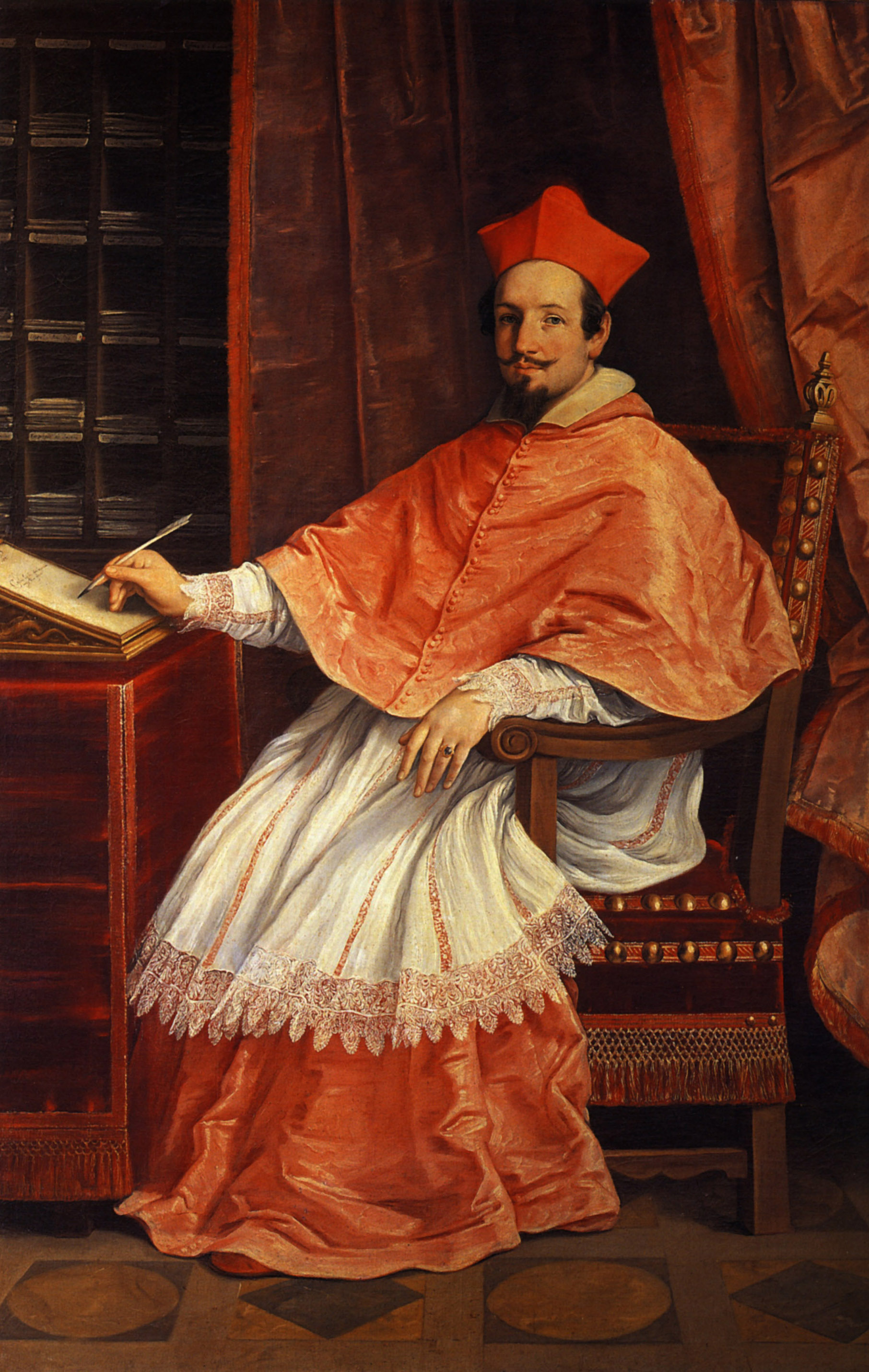
Bernardino Spada (1594–1661), made a cardinal on 19 January 1626.

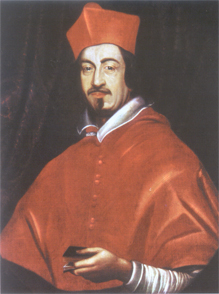
Ernst Adalbert of Harrach (1598–1667), made a cardinal on 19 January 1626.

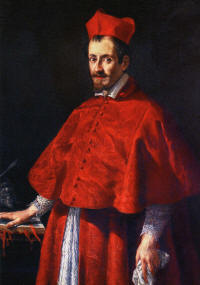
Giulio Cesare Sacchetti (1586–1663), made a cardinal on 19 January 1626.

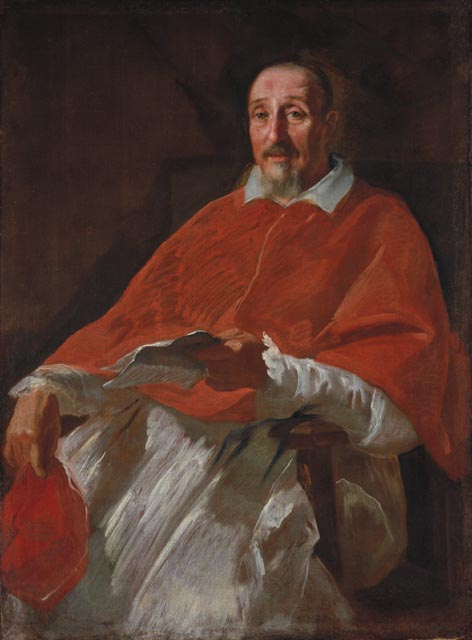
Lelio Biscia (1575–1638), made a cardinal on 19 January 1626.

1. Luigi Caetani, titular patriarch of Antioch – cardinal-priest of S. Pudenziana (received the title on 9 January 1626), † 15 April 1642
2. Denis-Simon de Marquemont, archbishop of Lyon – cardinal-priest of SS. Trinita al Monte Pincio (received the title on 9 February 1626), † 16 September 1626
3. Ernst Adalbert of Harrach, archbishop of Prague – cardinal-priest of S. Maria degli Angeli (received the title on 7 June 1632), then cardinal-priest of S. Prassede (13 July 1644), cardinal-priest of S. Lorenzo in Lucina (18 July 1667), † 25 October 1667
4. Bernardino Spada, titular archbishop of Damietta, nuncio in France – cardinal-priest of S. Stefano in Monte Celio (received the title on 9 August 1627), then cardinal-priest of S. Pietro in Vincoli (26 May 1642), cardinal-bishop of Albano (19 February 1646), cardinal-bishop of Frascati (29 April 1652), cardinal-bishop of Sabina (23 September 1652), cardinal-bishop of Palestrina (11 October 1655), † 10 September 1661
5. Laudivio Zacchia, bishop of Montefiascone e Corneto – cardinal-priest of S. Sisto (received the title on 9 February 1626), then cardinal-priest of S. Pietro in Vincoli (17 September 1629), † 30 August 1637
6. Berlinghiero Gessi, bishop of Rimini, governor of Urbino – cardinal-priest of S. Agostino (received the title on 19 July 1627), † 6 April 1639
7. Federico Baldissera Bartolomeo Cornaro, bishop of Bergamo – cardinal-priest of S. Maria in Traspontina (received the title on 22 June 1626), then cardinal-priest of S. Cecilia (15 November 1627), cardinal-priest of S. Marco (26 April 1629), cardinal-priest of S. Maria in Trastevere (19 November 1646), cardinal-bishop of Albano (29 April 1652), † 5 June 1653
8. Giulio Cesare Sacchetti, bishop of Gravina, nuncio in Spain – cardinal-priest of S. Susanna (received the title on 2 December 1626), then cardinal-priest of S. Maria in Trastevere (29 April 1652), cardinal-bishop of Frascati (23 September 1652), cardinal-bishop of Sabina (11 October 1655), † 28 June 1663
9. Giandomenico Spinola, auditor of the Apostolic Chamber – cardinal-priest of S. Clemente (received the title on 9 February 1626), then cardinal-priest of S. Cecilia (30 April 1629), † 11 August 1646
10. Giacomo Cavalieri, datary of His Holiness – cardinal-priest of S. Eusebio (received the title on 9 February 1626), † 28 January 1629
11. Lelio Biscia, dean of the Apostolic Chamber – cardinal-deacon of SS. Vito e Modesto (received the title on 9 February 1626), then cardinal-deacon of S. Maria in Cosmedin (19 December 1633), cardinal-priest of S. Maria del Popolo (9 February 1637), † 19 November 1638
12. Enrique de Guzmán Haros – cardinal-deacon without the title, † 21 June 1626
13. Nicholas Francis, Duke of Lorraine, administrator of the see of Toul, brother of the duke o Lorraine (created in pectore, published on 30 August 1627) – cardinal-deacon without the title; resigned the cardinalate in March 1634, † 27 January 1670
14. Girolamo Vidoni, treasurer general (created in pectore, published on 30 August 1627) – cardinal-deacon of SS. IV Coronati (received the title on 6 October 1627), † 30 October 1632
15. Marzio Ginetti (created in pectore, published on 30 August 1627) – cardinal-deacon of S. Maria Nuova (received the title on 6 October 1627), then cardinal-deacon of S. Angelo in Pescheria (6 February 1634), cardinal-deacon of S. Eustachio (14 March 1644), cardinal-priest of S. Maria degli Angeli (17 October 1644), cardinal-priest of S. Pietro in Vincoli (19 February 1646), cardinal-priest of S. Maria in Trastevere (23 September 1652), cardinal-bishop of Albano (9 June 1653), cardinal-bishop of Sabina (2 July 1663), cardinal-bishop of Porto e S. Rufina (11 October 1666), † 1 March 1671

== 30 August 1627 ==
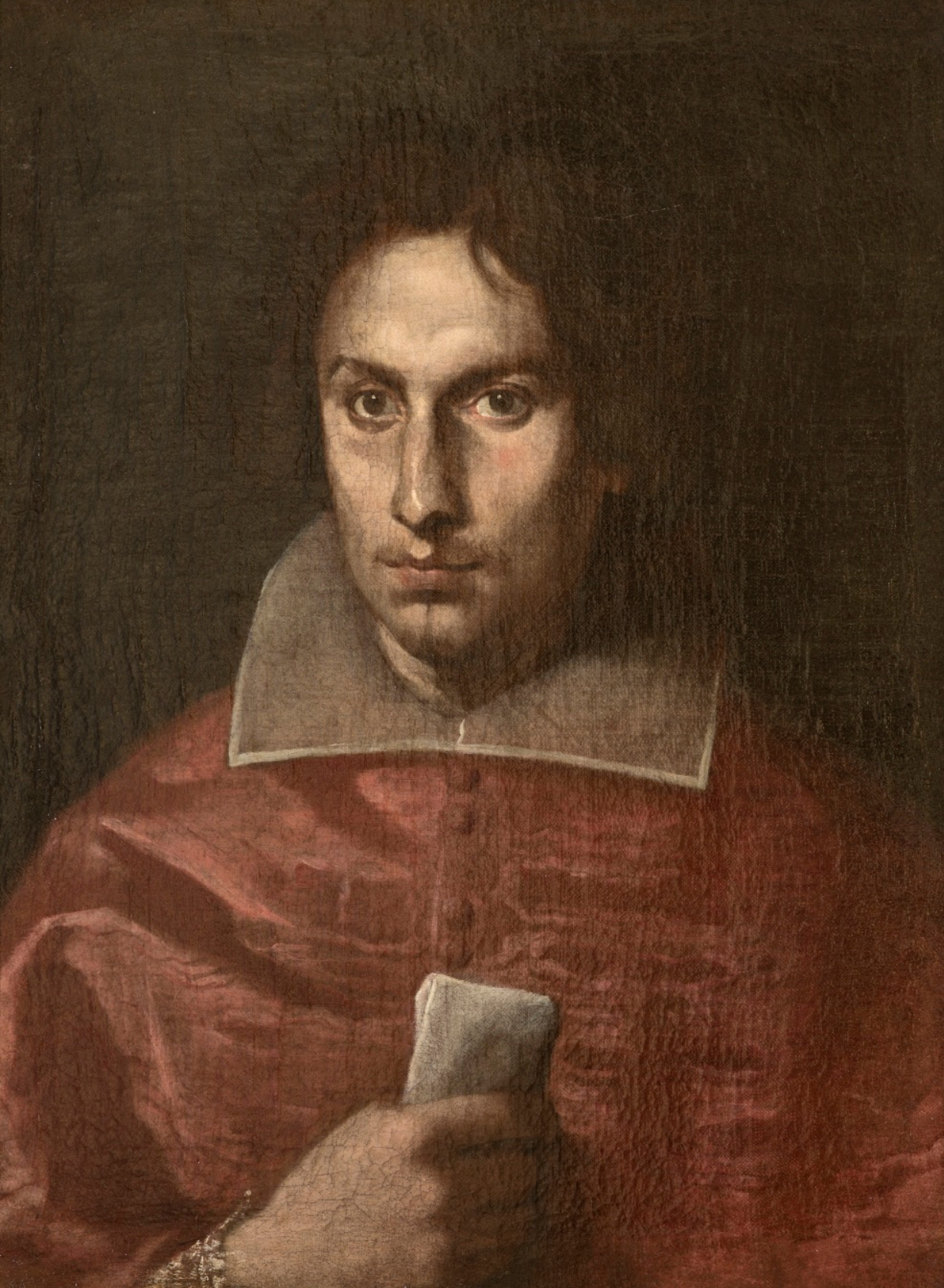
Antonio Barberini (1607–71), made a cardinal on 30 August 1627.

1. Fabrizio Verospi, governor of Umbria and Perugia – cardinal-priest of S. Lorenzo in Panisperna (received the title on 20 October 1627), then cardinal-priest of S. Maria della Pace (5 September 1633), † 27 January 1639
2. Gil Carrillo de Albornoz – cardinal-priest of S. Maria in Via (received the title on 12 August 160), then cardinal-priest of S. Pietro in Montorio (2 August 1643), † 19 December 1649
3. Pierre de Bérulle, C.O., general of the Congregation of Oratorians – cardinal-priest without the title, † 2 October 1629
4. Alessandro Cesarini – cardinal-deacon of S. Maria in Domnica (received the title on 6 October 1627), then cardinal-deacon of SS. Cosma e Damiano (6 September 1632), cardinal-deacon of S. Maria in Cosmedin (9 February 1637), cardinal-deacon of S. Eustachio (28 July 1638), † 25 January 1644
5. Antonio Barberini, nephew of the Pope (created in pectore, published on 7 February 1628) – cardinal-deacon of S. Maria in Aquiro (received the title on 28 February 1628), then cardinal-deacon of S. Agata in Suburra (24 November 1632), cardinal-deacon of S. Maria in Via Lata (10 November 1642), cardinal-priest of SS. Trinita al Monte Pincio (21 July 1653), cardinal-bishop of Frascati (11 October 1655), cardinal-bishop of Palestrina (21 November 1661), † 4 August 1671
6. Girolamo Colonna (created in pectore, published on 7 February 1628) – cardinal-deacon of S. Agnese in Agone (received the title on 28 February 1628), then cardinal-deacon of S. Maria in Cosmedin (27 June 1639), cardinal-deacon of S. Angelo in Pescheria (14 March 1644), cardinal-deacon of S. Eustachio (12 December 1644), cardinal-priest of S. Silvestro in Capite (23 September 1652), cardinal-priest of S. Maria in Trastevere (9 June 1653), cardinal-priest of S. Lorenzo in Lucina (21 April 1659), cardinal-bishop of Frascati (21 November 1661), † 4 September 1666
7. Giovanni Battista Pamphilj, titular patriarch of Antioch, nuncio in Spain (created in pectore, published on 19 November 1629) – cardinal-priest of S. Eusebio (received the title on 12 August 1630), became Pope Innocent X on 5 September 1644, † 7 January 1655
8. Giovanni Francesco Guidi di Bagno, archbishop of Cervia, nuncio in France (created in pectore, published on 19 November 1629) – cardinal-priest of S. Alessio (received the title on 26 May 1631), † 24 July 1641

== 19 November 1629 ==
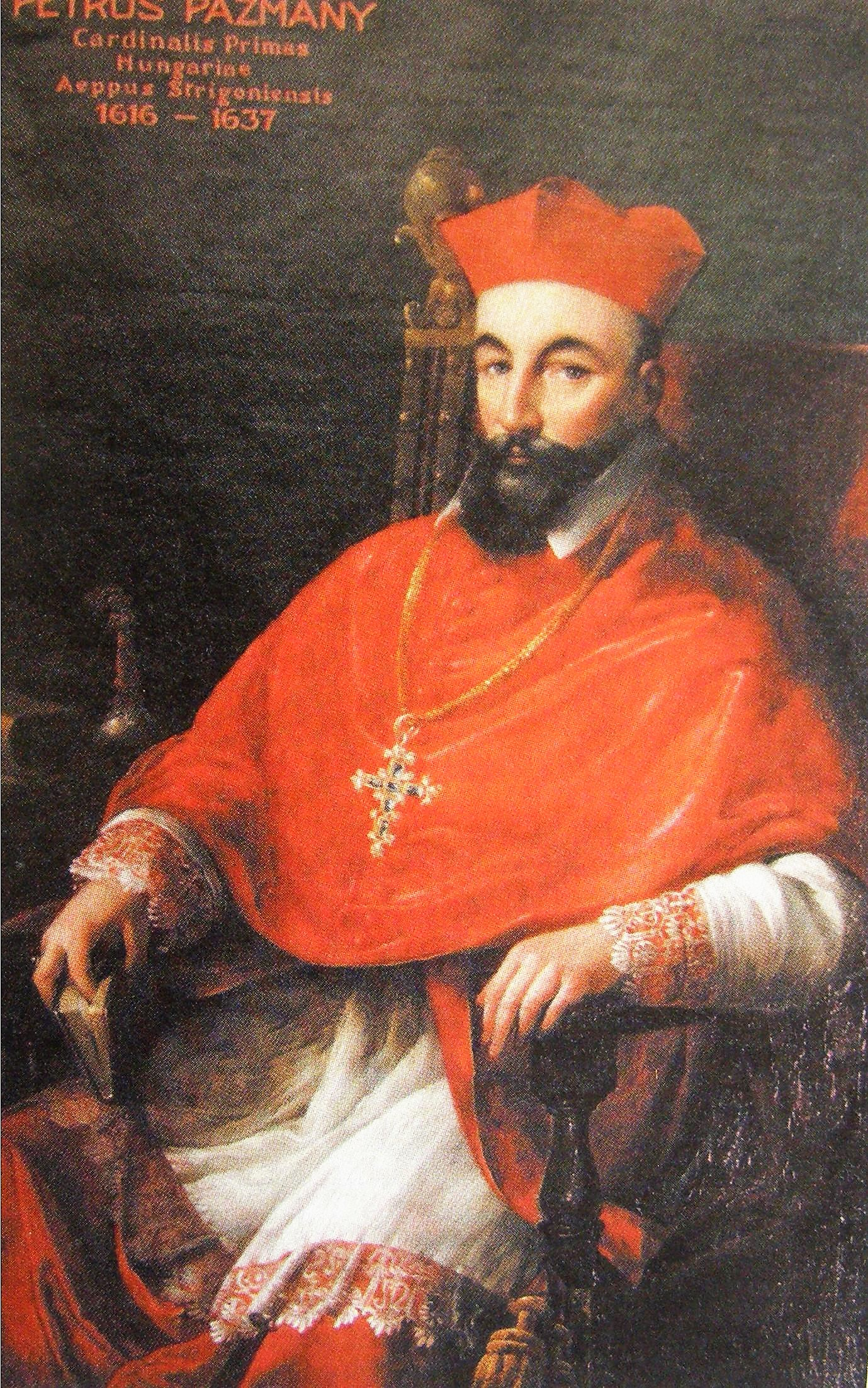
Péter Pázmány (1570–1637), made a cardinal on 19 November 1629.

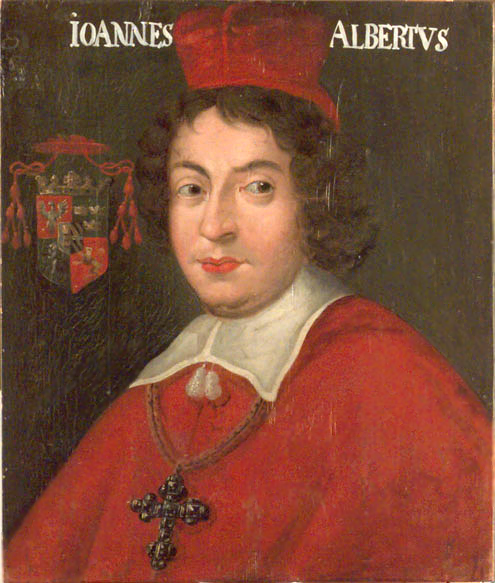
John Albert Vasa (1612–34), made a cardinal on 19 November 1629.

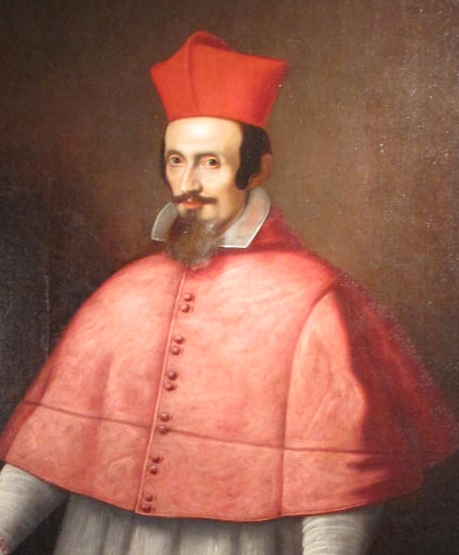
Cesare Monti (1593–1650), made a cardinal on 19 November 1629.

1. Péter Pázmány, S.J., archbishop of Esztergom – cardinal-priest of S. Girolamo degli Schiavoni (received the title on 31 May 1632), † 19 March 1637
2. Antonio Santacroce, titular archbishop of Seleucia, nuncio in Poland – cardinal-priest of SS. Nereo ed Achilleo (received the title on 12 August 1630), † 25 November 1641
3. Alphonse-Louis du Plessis de Richelieu, O.Carth., archbishop of Lyon – cardinal-priest of SS. Trinita al Monte Pincio (received the title on 4 June 1635), † 24 March 1653
4. Giovanni Battista Maria Pallotta, titular archbishop of Tessalonica, nuncio in Austria – cardinal-priest of S. Silvestro in Capite (received the title on 26 May 1631), then cardinal-priest of S. Pietro in Vincoli (23 September 1652), cardinal-priest of S. Maria in Trastevere (29 April 1659), cardinal-priest of S. Lorenzo in Lucina (21 November 1661), cardinal-bishop of Albano (2 July 1663), cardinal-bishop of Frascati (11 October 1666), † 22 January 1668
5. Gregorio Naro, auditor of the Apostolic Chamber – cardinal-priest of SS. Quirico e Giulitta (received the title on 17 December 1629), † 7 August 1634
6. Luca Antonio Virili – cardinal-priest of S. Salvatore in Lauro (17 December 1629), † 4 June 1634
7. Giangiacomo Teodoro Trivulzio – cardinal-deacon of S. Cesareo in Palatio (received the title on 17 December 1629), then cardinal-deacon of S. Nicola in Carcere (17 October 1644), cardinal-deacon of S. Angelo in Pescheria (12 December 1644), cardinal-deacon of S. Eustachio (23 September 1652), cardinal-deacon of S. Maria in Via Lata (21 July 1653), cardinal-priest of S. Maria del Popolo (14 May 1655), † 3 August 1656
8. Diego de Guzmán Haros, archbishop of Seville (created in pectore, published on 15 July 1630) – cardinal-priest without the title, † 21 January 1631
9. Jan Olbracht Waza, S.J., bishop of Krakowa (created in pectore, published on 20 December 1632) – cardinal-deacon of S. Maria in Aquiro (received the title on 20 December 1632), † 29 December 1634
10. Ciriaco Rocci, titular archbishop of Patras (created in pectore, published on 28 November 1633) – cardinal-priest of S. Salvatore in Lauro (received the title on 13 August 1635), † 25 September 1651
11. Cesare Monti, titular patriarch of Antioch and archbishop of Milan (created in pectore, published on 28 November 1633) – cardinal-priest of S. Maria in Traspontina (received the title on 6 August 1634), † 16 August 1650

== 28 November 1633 ==
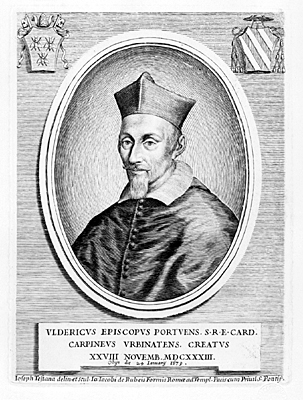
Ulderico Carpegna (1595–1679), made a cardinal on 28 November 1633.

1. Francesco Maria Brancaccio, bishop of Capaccio – cardinal-priest of SS. XII Apostoli (received the title on 9 January 1634), then cardinal-priest of S. Lorenzo in Lucina (2 July 1663), cardinal-bishop of Sabina (11 October 1666), cardinal-bishop of Frascati (30 January 1668), cardinal-bishop of Porto e S. Rufina (18 March 1671), † 9 January 1675
2. Alessandro Bichi, bishop of Carpentras, nuncio in France – cardinal-priest of S. Sabina (received the title on 7 September 1637), † 25 May 1657
3. Ulderico Carpegna, bishop of Gubbio – cardinal-priest of S. Anastasia (received the title on 9 January 1634), then cardinal-priest of S. Pietro in Vincoli (21 April 1659), cardinal-priest of S. Maria in Trastevere (21 November 1661), cardinal-bishop of Albano (11 October 1666), cardinal-bishop of Frascati (18 March 1671), cardinal-priest of Porto e S. Rufina (28 January 1675), † 24 January 1679
4. Stefano Durazzo, treasurer general of the Apostolic Chamber – cardinal-priest of S. Lorenzo in Panisperna (received the title on 9 January 1634), then cardinal-priest of S. Lorenzo in Lucina (11 October 1666), † 11 July 1667
5. Agostino Oreggi – cardinal-priest of S. Sisto (received the title on 9 January 1634), † 12 July 1635
6. Benedetto Ubaldi – cardinal-deacon of SS. Vito e Modesto (received the title on 9 January 1634), † 20 January 1644
7. Marco Antonio Franciotti, auditor of the Apostolic Chamber (created in pectore, published on 30 March 1637) – cardinal-priest of S. Clemente (received the title on 17 August 1637), then cardinal-priest of s. Maria della Pace (19 December 1639), † 8 February 1666

== 16 December 1641 ==
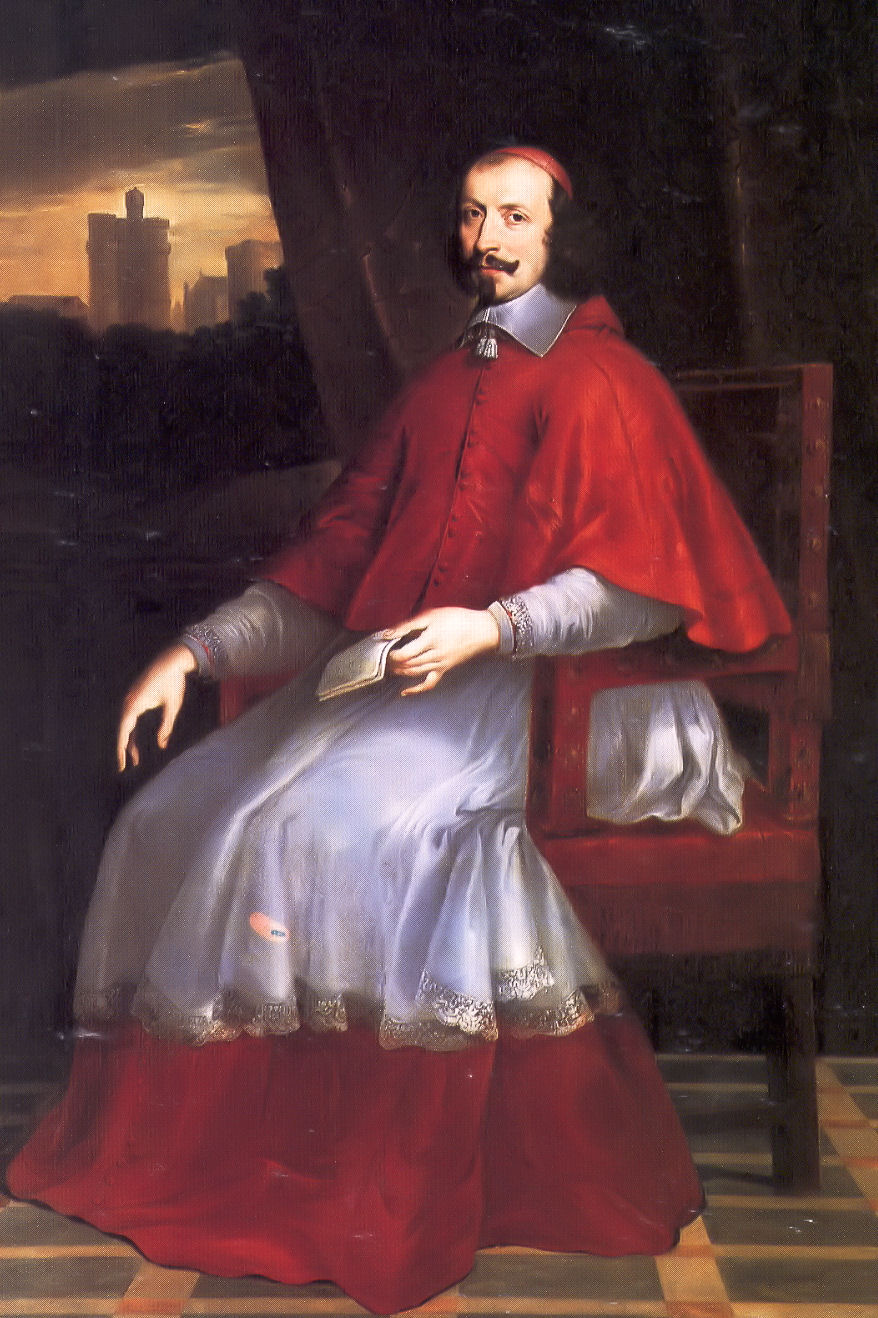
Jules Mazarin (1602–61), made a cardinal on 16 December 1641.

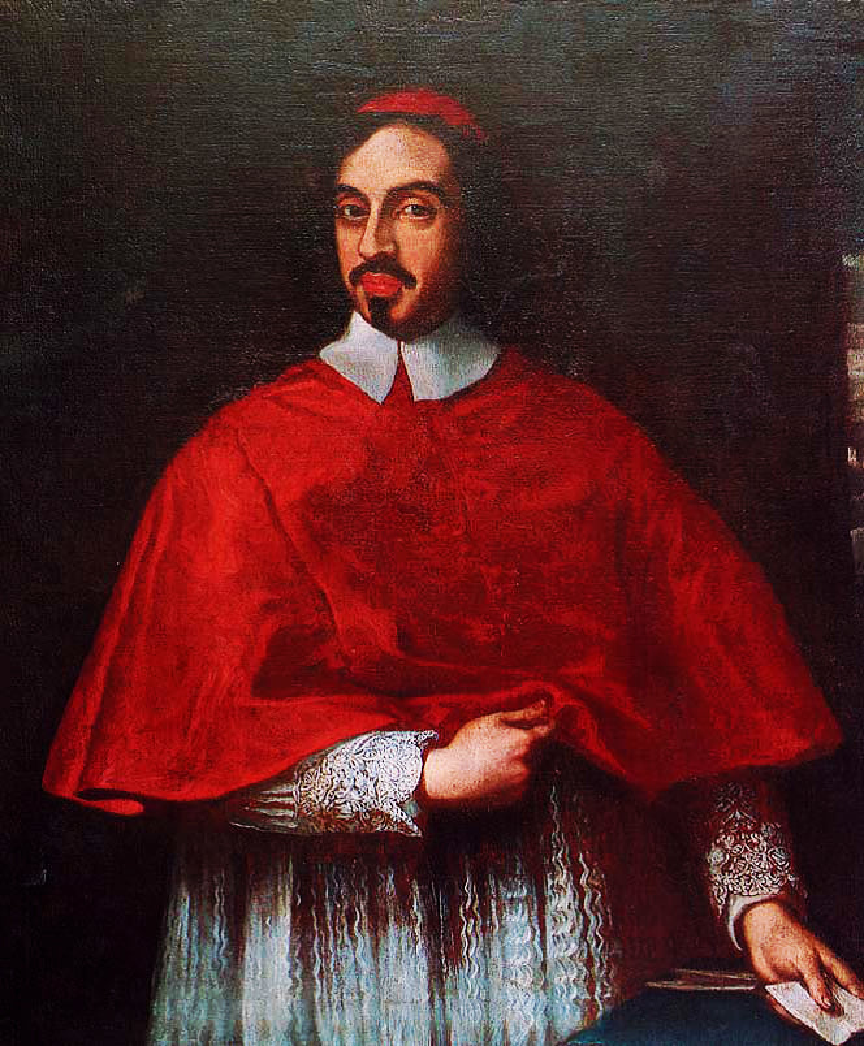
Rinaldo d'Este (1618–72), made a cardinal on 16 December 1641.

1. Francesco Maria Macchiavelli, titular patriarch of Constantinople and bishop of Ferrara – cardinal-priest of SS. Giovanni e Paolo (received the title on 26 May 1642), † 22 November 1653
2. Ascanio Filomarino, archbishop of Naples – cardinal-priest of S. Maria in Aracoeli (received the title on 10 February 1642), † 3 November 1666
3. Marcantonio Bragadin, bishop of Vicenza – cardinal-priest of SS. Nereo ed Achilleo (received the title on 26 May 1642), then cardinal-priest of S. Marco (19 November 1646), † 28 March 1658
4. Ottaviano Raggi, auditor of the Apostolic Chamber – cardinal-priest of S. Agostino (received the title on 10 February 1642), † 31 December 1643
5. Pier Donato Cesi, treasurer general of the Apostolic Chamber – cardinal-priest of S. Marcello (received the title on 10 February 1642), † 30 January 1656
6. Girolamo Verospi – cardinal-priest of S. Agnese in Agone (received the title on 10 February 1642), † 5 January 1652
7. Vincenzo Maculani, O.P., Master of the Sacred Palace – cardinal-priest of S. Clemente (received the title on 10 February 1642), † 16 February 1667
8. Francesco Peretti di Montalto – cardinal-priest of S. Girolamo degli Schiavoni (received the title on 10 February 1642), † 3 May 1655
9. Giulio Gabrielli – cardinal-deacon of S. Maria Nuova (received the title on 10 February 1642), then cardinal-deacon of S. Agata in Suburra (10 November 1642), cardinal-deacon of S. Maria in Via Lata (14 May 1655), cardinal-priest of S. Prisca (6 March 1656), cardinal-priest of S. Prassede (18 July 1667), cardinal-priest of S. Lorenzo in Lucina (14 November 1667), cardinal-bishop of Sabina (30 January 1668), † 31 August 1677
10. Giulio Raimondo Mazzarini – cardinal-priest without the title, † 9 March 1661
11. Virginio Orsini, O.S.Io.Hieros. – cardinal-deacon of S. Maria in Portico (received the title on 10 February 1642), then cardinal-deacon of S. Maria Nuova (10 November 1642), cardinal-deacon of S. Maria in Cosmedin (14 March 1644), cardinal-deacon of S. Eustachio (21 July 1653), cardinal-deacon of S. Maria in Via Lata (6 March 1653), cardinal-priest of S. Maria degli Angeli (11 October 1666), cardinal-priest of S. Prassede (14 November 1667), cardinal-priest of S. Lorenzo in Lucina (30 January 1668), cardinal-bishop of Albano (18 March 1671), cardinal-bishop of Frascati (28 January 1675), † 21 August 1676
12. Rinaldo d'Este – cardinal-deacon of S. Maria Nuova (received the title on 28 November 1644), then cardinal-deacon of S. Nicola in Carcere (12 December 1644), cardinal-priest of S. Pudenziana (12 March 1668), cardinal-priest of S. Lorenzo in Lucina (18 March 1671), cardinal-bishop of Palestrina (24 August 1671), † 30 September 1672

== 13 July 1643 ==
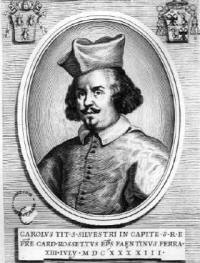
Carlo Rossetti (1614–81), made a cardinal on 13 July 1643.

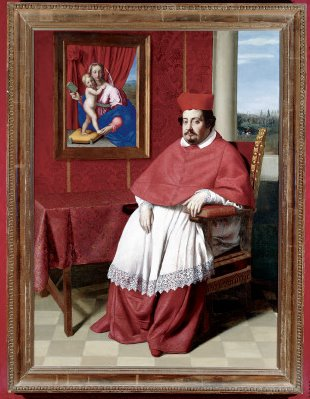
Francesco Angelo Rapaccioli (1608–57), made a cardinal on 13 July 1643.

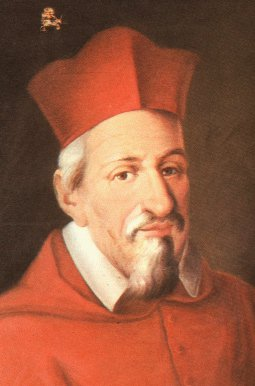
Juan de Lugo y de Quiroga (John de Lugo) (1583–1660), made a cardinal on 13 July 1643.

1. Giovanni Giacomo Panciroli, titular patriarch of Constantinople – cardinal-priest of S. Stefano al Monte Celio (received the title on 28 November 1644), † 3 September 1651
2. Fausto Poli, titular archbishop of Amesa – cardinal-priest of S. Crisogono (received the title on 31 August 1643), † 7 October 1653
3. Lelio Falconieri, titular archbishop of Tebe, secretary of the S. C. of Bishops and Regulars – cardinal-priest of S. Maria del Popolo (received the title on 31 August 1643), † 14 December 1648
4. Gaspare Mattei, titular archbishop of Athens – cardinal-priest of S. Pancrazio (received the title on 14 December 1643), then cardinal-priest of S. Cecilia (28 September 1648), † 9 April 1650
5. Cesare Facchinetti, archbishop of Senigallia – cardinal-priest of SS. IV Coronati (received the title on 31 August 1643), then cardinal-priest of S. Lorenzo in Lucina (24 August 1671), cardinal-bishop of Palestrina (14 November 1672), cardinal-bishop of Porto e S. Rufina (6 February 1679), cardinal-bishop of Ostia e Velletri (8 January 1680), † 31 January 1683
6. Girolamo Grimaldi-Cavalleroni, titular archbishop of Seleucia – cardinal-priest of S. Eusebio (received the title on 17 October 1644), then cardinal-priest of SS. Trinita al Monte Pincio (11 October 1655), cardinal-bishop of Albano (28 January 1675), † 4 November 1685
7. Carlo Rossetti, archbishop of Faenza – cardinal-deacon of S. Cesareo in Palatio (received the title on 28 November 1644), then cardinal-priest of S. Maria in Via (18 August 1653), cardinal-priest of S. Silvestro in Capite (9 March 1654), cardinal-priest of S. Lorenzo in Lucina (14 November 1672), cardinal-bishop of Frascati (19 October 1676), cardinal-bishop of Porto e S. Rufina (8 January 1680), † 23 November 1681
8. Giambattista Altieri – cardinal-priest of S. Maria sopra Minerva (received the title on 31 August 1643), † 26 November 1654
9. Mario Theodoli, auditor of the Apostolic Chamber – cardinal-priest of S. Alessio (received the title on 31 August 1643), then cardinal-priest of S. Maria del Popolo (28 January 1649), † 27 June 1650
10. Francesco Angelo Rapaccioli, treasurer general of the Apostolic Chamber – cardinal-priest of S. Maria in Via (received the title on 14 December 1643), then cardinal-priest of S. Cecilia (21 November 1650), † 15 May 1657
11. Francesco Adriano Ceva, secretary of state – cardinal-priest of S. Prisca (received the title on 31 August 1643), † 12 October 1655
12. Vincenzo Costaguti – cardinal-deacon of S. Maria in Portico (received the title on 31 August 1643), then cardinal-deacon of S. Angelo in Pescheria (23 September 1652), cardinal-deacon of S. Maria in Cosmedin (21 July 1653), cardinal-deacon of S. Eustachio (6 March 1656), cardinal-priest of S. Callisto (19 July 1660), † 6 December 1660
13. Giovanni Stefano Donghi – cardinal-deacon of S. Giorgio in Velabro (received the title on 31 August 1643), then cardinal-deacon of S. Agata in Suburra (14 May 1655), † 26 November 1669
14. Paolo Emilio Rondinini – cardinal-deacon of S. Maria in Aquiro (received the title on 31 August 1643), then cardinal-deacon of S. Giorgio in Velabro (14 May 1655), cardinal-deacon of S. Maria in Cosmedin (6 March 1656), cardinal-priest of S. Eusebio (30 April 1668), † 16 September 1668
15. Angelo Giori – cardinal-deacon without the title, then cardinal-priest of SS. Quirico e Giulitta (31 August 1643), † 8 August 1662
16. Juan de Lugo y de Quiroga, S.J. (created in pectore, published on 14 December 1643) – cardinal-priest of S. Stefano al Monte Celio (received the title on 2 May 1644), then cardinal-priest of S. Balbina (17 October 1644), † 20 August 1660
17. Achille d'Étampes de Valençay, OS.Io.Hieros., general of the papal army (created in pectore, published on 14 December 1643) – cardinal-deacon of S. Adriano (received the title on 2 May 1644),† 27 June 1646

== Sources ==
- Miranda, Salvador. "Consistories for the creation of Cardinals, 17th Century (1605–1700): Urban VIII (1623–1644)". The Cardinals of the Holy Roman Church. Florida International University. OCLC 53276621.
- P. Gauchat: Hierarchia Catholica, vol. IV, Münster 1935
