= San Simeone Profeta, Rome =

San Simeone Profeta
- Church of Saint Simon the Prophet
- San Simeone in Posterula
- Chiesa di San Simeone Profeta
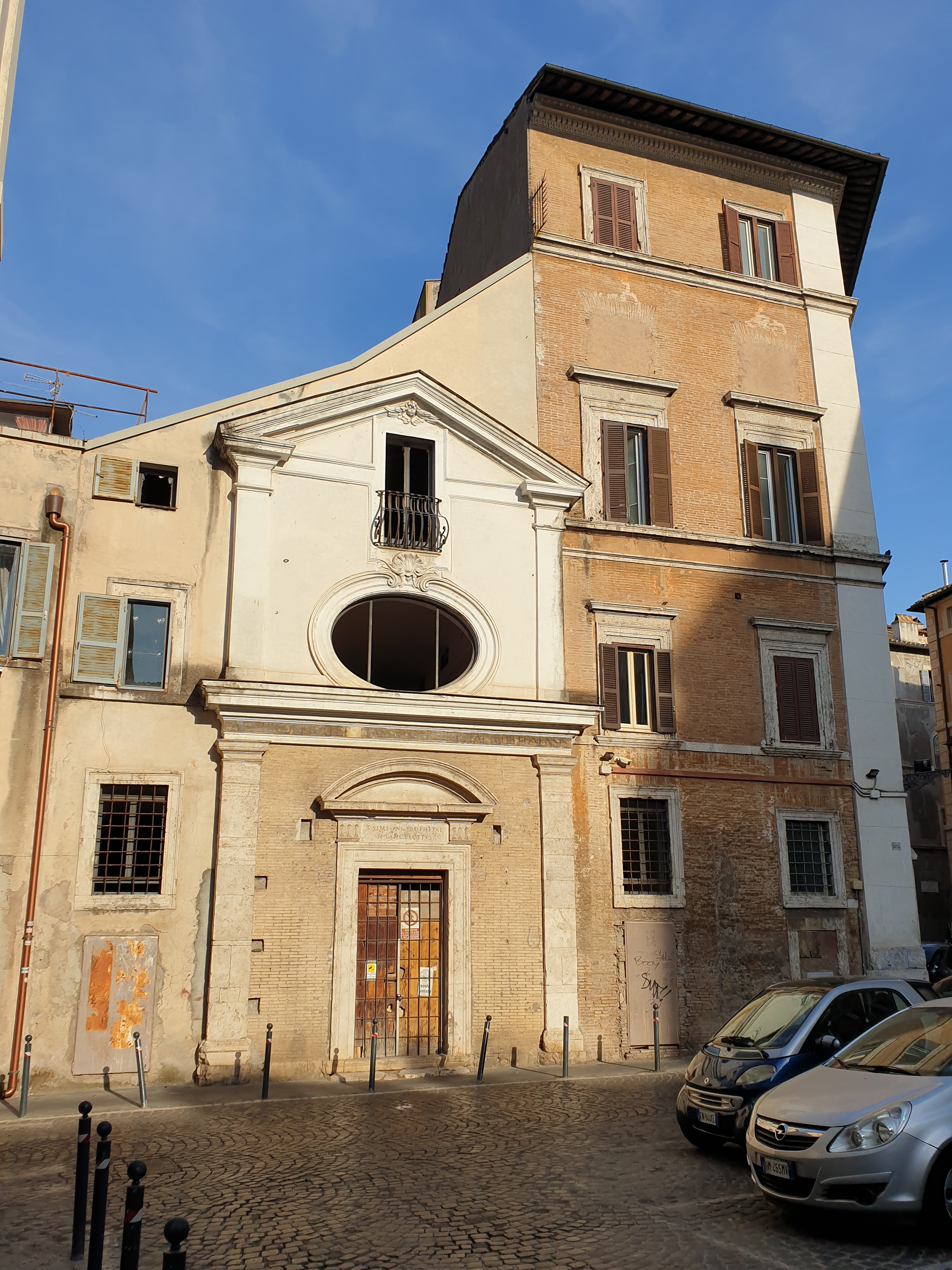
- Click on the map for a fullscreen view
- 41°54′04″N 12°28′12″E
- Location: Ponte, Rome
- Country: Italy

History
- Dedication: Saint Simeon

Architecture
- Functional status: Deconsecrated
- Completed: 1610

The church of San Simeone Profeta was a church in Rome, in the Ponte district, located in the Piazza Lancellotti.

== History ==
This church has medieval origins (the first mention is found in a document of the Regestum Farfense of January 23, 1017) and was called San Simeone de Ponte. It appears in the catalog of Cencio Camerario (1192) with the name of Sancto Symeoni de Pusterula.

It was then completely restored in 1610 at the behest of Cardinal Orazio Lancellotti, who had his own palace overlooking the square, and dedicated to the prophet Simeon. Later the church was entrusted to the Confraternity of Margaret of Cortona, for which it is also called Santa Margherita.

By the end of the nineteenth century it no longer had a dedicated priest, and in the first half of the twentieth century, after the collapse of the roof, it was totally abandoned.

The church once had three naves and housed works by Ventura Salimbeni and Carlo Saraceni. Today only the façade remains, while the rest of the building, while maintaining the three-nave structure, has been modified to make room for residential flats.

== Titular Church ==
The Cardinal title of Saint Simeone Profeta was created on 4 December 1551 by Pope Julius III and suppressed by Pope Sixtus V in 1587. The title was also known by the name of Saint Simeon in Posterula.

=== Holders ===
- Giacomo Puteo (4 December 1551 - 29 May 1555 appointed Cardinal Priest of Santa Maria in Via)
- Virgilio Rosario (24 March 1557 - 22 May 1559 deceased)
- Bernardo Salviati (27 June 1561 - 15 May 1566 appointed Cardinal Priest of Santa Prisca)
- Vacant (1566 - 1570)
- Charles d'Angennes de Rambouillet (9 June 1570 - 20 November 1570 appointed Cardinal Priest of Sant'Eufemia)
- Giovanni Aldobrandini (20 November 1570 - 7 September 1573 deceased)
- Vacant (1573 - 1584)
- Scipione Lancellotti (9 January 1584 - 20 April 1587 appointed Cardinal Priest of San Salvatore in Lauro)

== Sources ==
- Armellini, Le chiese di Roma dal secolo IV al XIX, Rome 1891
- Storia e Stampe antiche
- C. Rendina, Le Chiese di Roma, Newton & Compton Editori, Milan 2000, p.345
