= Francisco Gutiérrez (bishop) =

Most Reverend Francisco Gutiérrez
- Bishop of Ischia
- Church: Catholic Church
- Diocese: Diocese of Ischia
- In office: 1548–1554
- Predecessor: Agostino Falivenia
- Successor: Virgilio Rosario

Personal details
- Born: Spain
- Died: 1554

Francisco Gutiérrez (died 1554) was a Roman Catholic prelate who served as Bishop of Ischia (1548–1554).

== Biography ==
Francisco Gutiérrez was born in Spain. On 24 Sep 1548, he was appointed during the papacy of Pope Paul III as Bishop of Ischia. He served as Bishop of Ischia until his death in 1554.

== External links and additional sources ==
- Cheney, David M. "Diocese of Ischia". Catholic-Hierarchy.org. (for Chronology of Bishops) ^{[self-published]}
- Chow, Gabriel. "Diocese of Ischia". GCatholic.org. (for Chronology of Bishops) ^{[self-published]}

Catholic Church titles
Preceded by Agostino Falivenia	Bishop of Ischia; 1548–1554	Succeeded by Virgilio Rosario
