= Francesco Tontori =

Most Reverend Francesco Tontori
- Bishop of Ischia
- Church: Catholic Church
- Diocese: Diocese of Ischia
- In office: 1638–1663
- Predecessor: Iñigo de Avalos
- Successor: Giovanni Antonio de' Vecchi

Orders
- Consecration: 24 January 1638 by Francesco Maria Brancaccio

Personal details
- Died: 1663 Ischia, Italy

Francesco Tontori, C.R.S. or Francesco Tontolo (died 1663) was a Roman Catholic prelate who served as Bishop of Ischia (1638–1663).

== Biography ==
Francesco Tontori was ordained a priest in the Ordo Clericorum Regularium a Somascha. On 15 January 1638, he was appointed during the papacy of Pope Urban VIII as Bishop of Ischia. On 24 January 1638, he was consecrated bishop by Francesco Maria Brancaccio, Cardinal-Priest of Santi XII Apostoli, with Alfonso Gonzaga, Titular Archbishop of Rhodus, and Biago Proto de Rubeis, Archbishop of Messina, serving as co-consecrators. He served as Bishop of Ischia until his death in 1663. While bishop, he was the principal co-consecrator of Ludovico Ridolfi, Bishop of Patti (1649).

== External links and additional sources ==
- Cheney, David M. "Diocese of Ischia". Catholic-Hierarchy.org. (for Chronology of Bishops) ^{[self-published]}
- Chow, Gabriel. "Diocese of Ischia". GCatholic.org. (for Chronology of Bishops) ^{[self-published]}

Catholic Church titles
Preceded by Iñigo de Avalos	Bishop of Ischia; 1638–1663	Succeeded by Giovanni Antonio de' Vecchi
