= Scipione Lancelotti =

Italian cardinal

- Cardinal-Priest of San Salvatore in Lauro
- Church: Catholic Church
- See: San Salvatore in Lauro
- In office: 20 April 1587 – 2 June 1598
- Predecessor: Position established
- Successor: Silvio Antoniano
- Previous post: Cardinal-Priest of San Simeone Profeta

Orders
- Created cardinal: 12 December 1583 by Pope Gregory XIII

Personal details
- Born: 1527 Rome, Papal States
- Died: 2 June 1598 (aged 70–71) Rome, Papal States

Scipione Lancelotti (1527–1598) was an Italian who became a cardinal within the Roman Catholic Church.

== Biography ==
=== Background ===
Scipione Lancelotti was born in Rome in 1527, the son of Orazio Lancellotti (personal physician of Pope Julius II and an abbreviator) and his wife Antonina Aragonia. His brother Lancellotto Lancellotti became Archbishop of Rossano. He was the uncle of Cardinal Orazio Lancellotti.

He was educated at the University of Bologna, becoming a doctor of both laws. He became a consistorial lawyer during the pontificate of Pope Paul III.

=== Early career as a papal diplomat ===
Pope Paul IV sent him on missions to Romagna and the Republic of Venice.

Pope Pius IV later sent him on a mission to the Duchy of Milan for the council held there by Cardinal Charles Borromeo, and later to the Council of Trent. There in 1563, the papal legates deputized him to Philip II of Spain to try to induce him to attend the Council along with Maximilian, King of the Romans and Albert V, Duke of Bavaria. He then returned to Rome where the pope made him an auditor of the Roman Rota in 1565. The pope then sent him back to Trento on a mission to Cardinal Cristoforo Madruzzo, Prince-Bishop of Trent, and to attempt to resolve a dispute between the cardinal and Ferdinand, Archduke of Austria, which he did successfully. He was then a member of the delegation headed by Cardinal Gianfrancesco Commendone to the Imperial election of 1575.

Pope Gregory XIII then appointed him to accompany Cardinal Flavio Orsini, legate a latere before Charles IX of France. He then returned to Rome and quickly despatched to the Kingdom of Naples and Romagna on business of the Roman Rota.

=== Cardinalate ===
Pope Gregory XIII made him a cardinal priest in the consistory of 12 December 1583. He received the red hat and the titular church of San Simeone Profeta on 9 January 1584. He participated in the papal conclave of 1585 that elected Pope Sixtus V. In 1585, the pope made him Secretary of Apostolic Briefs. The pope then despatched him to solve a dispute between Bologna and Alfonso II d'Este, Duke of Ferrara. On 20 April 1587 he opted for the titular church of San Salvatore in Lauro. He participated in the first papal conclave of 1590 that elected Pope Urban VII; in the second papal conclave of 1590 that elected Pope Gregory XIV; in the papal conclave of 1591 that elected Pope Innocent IX; and in the papal conclave of 1592 that elected Pope Clement VIII.

He died in Rome on 2 June 1598. He is buried in the Archbasilica of St. John Lateran.
