= Silvio Antoniano =

Roman Catholic priest and musician

- Cardinal-Priest of San Salvatore in Lauro
- Church: Roman Catholic Church
- Appointed: 17 March 1599
- Term ended: 16 August 1603
- Predecessor: Scipione Lancelotti
- Successor: Séraphin Olivier-Razali
- Previous posts: Secretary of the College of Cardinals (1568-92); Secretary of the Congregation for Bishops and Regulars (1590-99)

Orders
- Ordination: 17 June 1568
- Created cardinal: 3 March 1599 by Pope Clement VIII
- Rank: Cardinal-Priest

Personal details
- Born: 31 December 1540 Rome, Papal States
- Died: 16 August 1603 (aged 62) Rome, Papal States
- Buried: Santa Maria in Vallicella
- Parents: Matteo Antoniano; Pace Colella
- Education: University of Ferrara

Silvio Antoniano (31 December 1540, Rome – 16 August 1603, Rome) was a musician, canon lawyer, writer on education, priest and cardinal of the Roman Catholic Church, who spent most of his career in the Roman Curia.

== Life ==
The son of a poor wool merchant, his talent with the lyre at a young age drew the attention of many patrons and led indirectly to his career in the Church.

Cardinal Otto Truchsess von Waldburg funded his education at a young age. Pope Julius III provided Antoniano with room and board at the Apostolic Palace. He met Ercole II d'Este, Duke of Ferrara, who sponsored his studies at the University of Ferrara, where Antoniano earned a doctorate in civil and canon law in 1556, and was professor of classical literature.

After the death of the Duke of Ferrara, he returned to Rome. In 1563, Pope Pius IV appointed him to the chair of belles-lettres in Sapienza University, a position in which he worked with St Charles Borromeo, who made him his personal secretary. In 1566, he resigned the chair, and took up the study of theology under the direction of St Philip Neri and was ordained priest on 12 June 1568.

Pope Pius V named him Secretary of the College of Cardinals, a position he held for twenty-four years. Pope Sixtus V named him secretary of the Congregation of Bishops and Regulars. Clement VIII appointed him Secretary of Papal Briefs in 1593. Antoniano was also Master of the Papal Chamber and a Canon of the Basilica of Saint Peter.

Pope Clement created him Cardinal Priest of San Salvatore in Lauro on 3 March 1599. He was present at the acceptance of the Union of Brest, and two of his writings are inscribed on the north and south faces of the pedestal supporting the Vatican obelisk in Saint Peter's Square. He died in Rome in 1603, and is interred in Santa Maria in Vallicella.

== Works ==
With the advent of Italian humanism in the late sixteenth century, Antoniano devoted himself to the study of educational problems and at the instance of St Charles Borromeo, wrote his principal work on the Christian education of children, (Tre libri dell' educazione cristiana de' figliuoli, Verona, 1584.) His work passed through several editions in Italian and was translated into French by Guignard (Troyes, 1856; Paris, 1873), and into German by Kunz (Freiburg, 1888). The other writings of Antoniano, many of which have not been published, deal with literary, historical, and liturgical subjects.

He was one of the compilers of the Roman Catechism and a member of the commission charged by Clement VIII with the revision of the Breviary.
