= Ludovico Rusconi Sassi =

Italian architect (1678–1736)

Ludovico Rusconi Sassi (28 February 1678 – 18 August 1736) was an Italian architect of the Rococo period.

== Biography and principal works ==
Born in Rome, Papal States, he was inducted in 1702 to the Academy of Saint Luke.

Ludovico Rusconi is known to have worked for the cardinal Pietro Ottoboni, grandson of Pope Alexander VIII, planning a tabernacle on via Pellegrino in Rome.

He designed the Odescalchi chapel in the Basilica dei Santi Apostoli (1719–1722) and Paolucci chapel in San Marcello al Corso (1723–1724). He worked on the cupola and presbytery of San Salvatore in Lauro and the designs for San Giuseppe alla Lungara (1730–1734). The latter is inspired by Francesco Borromini's San Carlo alle Quattro Fontane. He also prepared a model for the competition to design the facade of San Giovanni in Laterano (1732); the competition was won by the Neoclassic design of Alessandro Galilei.

He died in Rome in 1736.
