= Virgilio Rosario =

Italian Roman Catholic bishop and cardinal

- Cardinal-Priest of San Simeone Profeta; Bishop of Ischia
- Church: Catholic Church
- In office: 1557-1559
- Predecessor: Giacomo Puteo
- Successor: Bernardo Salviati
- Previous post: Bishop of Ischia (1555-1559)

Orders
- Consecration: 24 February 1555 by Giovanni Michele Saraceni
- Created cardinal: 24 March 1557 by Pope Paul IV
- Rank: Cardinal-Priest

Personal details
- Born: 1499 Spoleto, Italy
- Died: 22 May 1559 (aged 59–60)

Virgilio Rosario (1499 – 22 May 1559) was an Italian Roman Catholic bishop and cardinal.

== Biography ==
Virgilio Rosario was born in Spoleto in 1499. He became a doctor of both laws. He was ordained as a priest and became rector of a parish. He then moved to Rome, becoming a canon of Sancta Maria at Martyres (i.e. the Pantheon, which was consecrated as a church in 609 AD).

On 27 August 1554 he was elected during the papacy of Pope Julius III as Bishop of Ischia. He was consecrated as a bishop on 24 February 1555 in the Sistine Chapel by Cardinal Giovanni Michele Saraceni with Ascanio Ferrari, Bishop Emeritus of Montepeloso and Fabio Mirto Frangipani, Bishop of Caiazzo, serving as co-consecrators.

Pope Paul IV made him a cardinal priest in the consistory of 15 March 1557. He received the red hat and the titular church of San Simone Profeta on 24 March 1557. He was named Vicar General of Rome perpetuo in 1558, holding this position until his death. He was a member of the commission of four cardinals charged with judging the case of Cardinal Giovanni Morone.

He died suddenly in the Apostolic Palace in Rome on 22 May 1559. He was buried in Santa Maria sopra Minerva.

== External links and additional sources ==
- Cheney, David M. "Diocese of Ischia". Catholic-Hierarchy.org. (for Chronology of Bishops) ^{[self-published]}
- Chow, Gabriel. "Diocese of Ischia". GCatholic.org. (for Chronology of Bishops) ^{[self-published]}

Catholic Church titles
Preceded by Francisco Gutiérrez (bishop)	Bishop of Ischia; 1555-1559	Succeeded by Filippo Geri
Preceded by Giacomo Puteo	Cardinal-Priest of San Simeone Profeta; 1557-1559	Succeeded by Bernardo Salviati
