= Diocese of Ischia =

Roman Catholic diocese in Italy

Coordinates: 40.7500°N 13.9500°E

Diocese of Ischia Dioecesis Isclana

Catholic
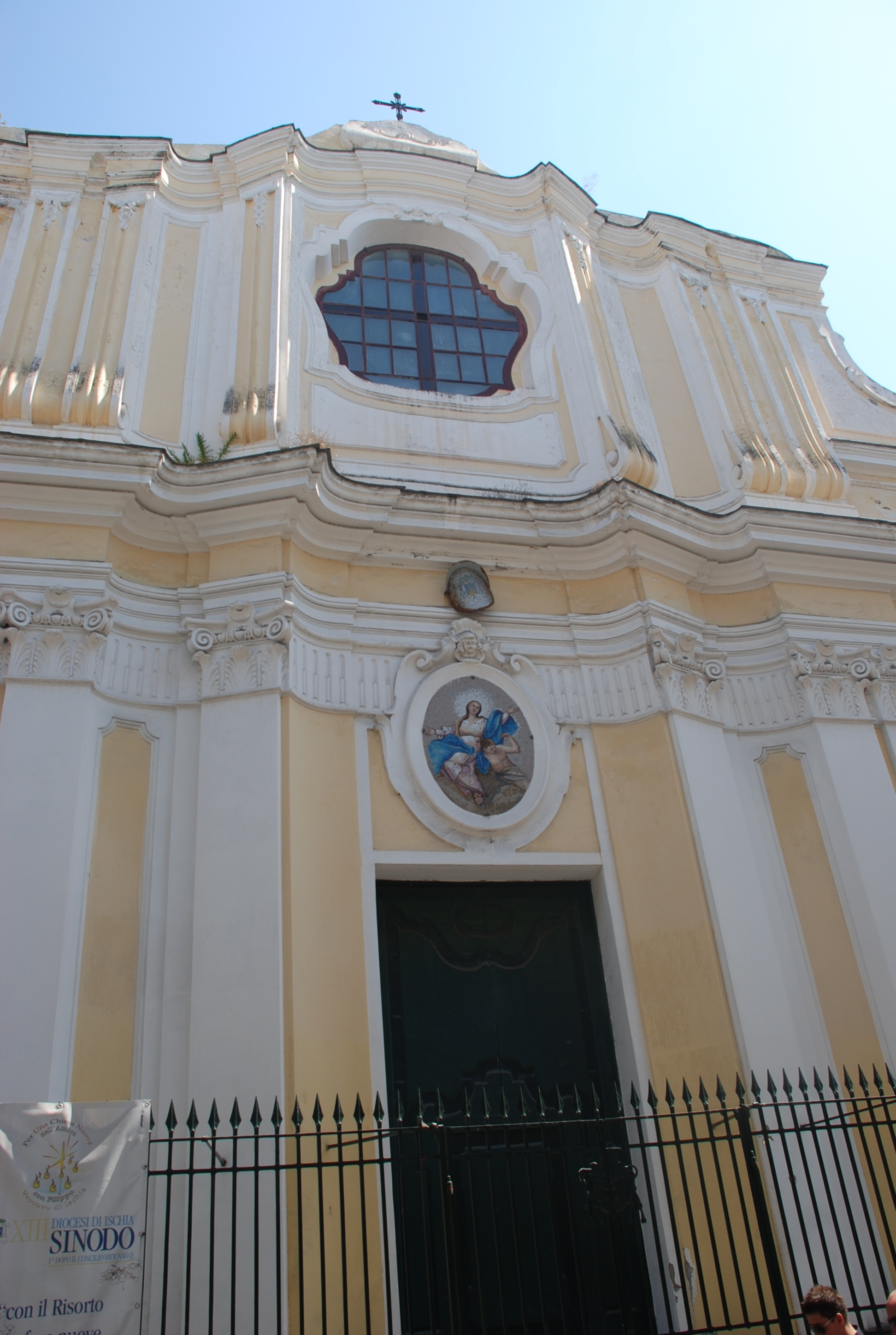
- Ischia Cathedral

Location
- Country: Italy
- Ecclesiastical province: Naples

Statistics
- Area: 46 km^{2} (18 sq mi)
- Population: Total; Catholics: (as of 2016); 70,043; 60,282 (86.1%)
- Parishes: 25

Information
- Denomination: Catholic Church
- Rite: Roman Rite
- Established: 12th century
- Cathedral: Cattedrale di S. Maria Assunta
- Secular priests: 30 (diocesan); 6 (Religious Orders); 9 Permanent Deacons

Current leadership
- Pope: Leo XIV
- Bishop: Gennaro Pascarella

Map
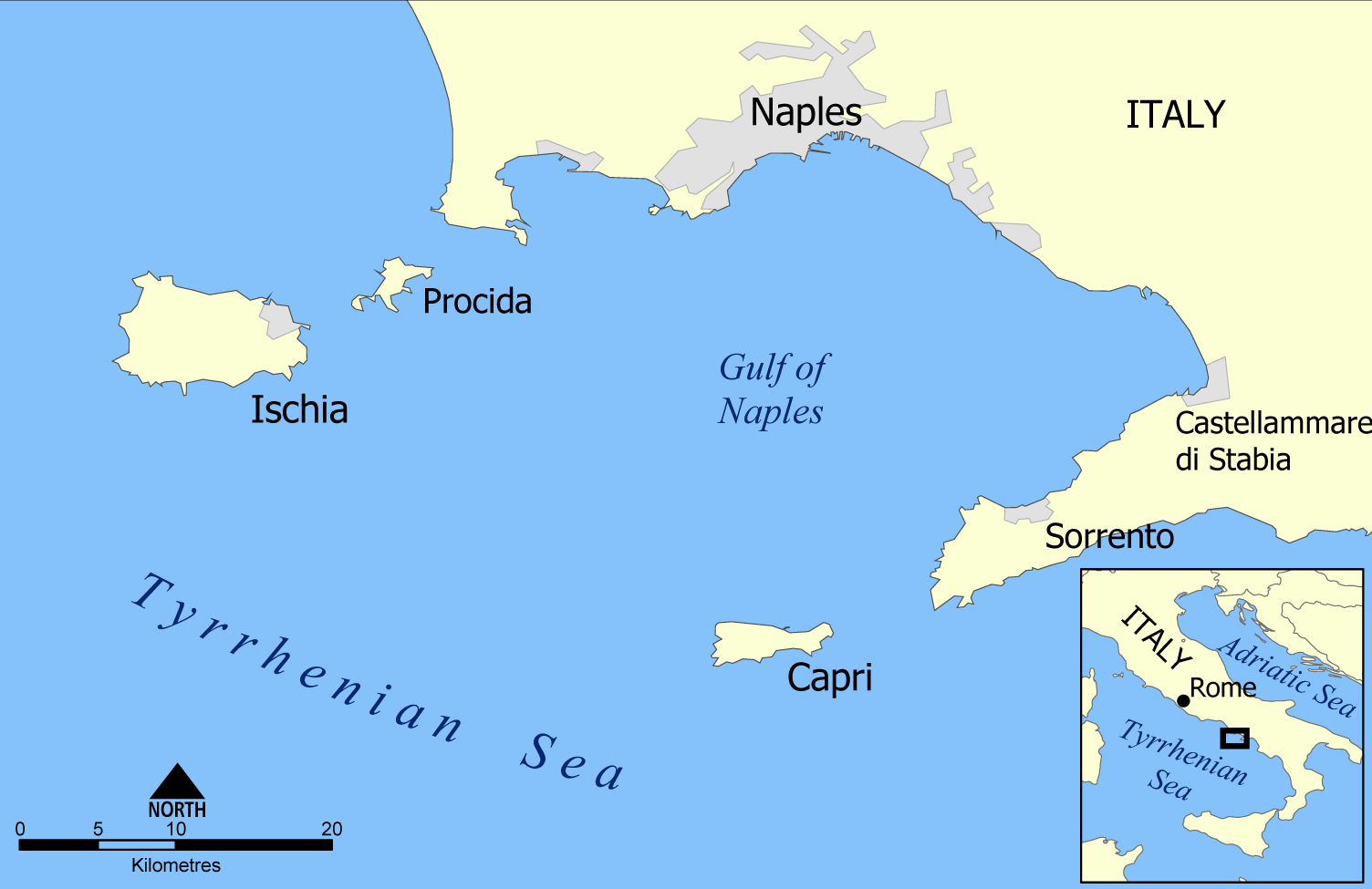

Website
- www.chiesaischia.it

The Diocese of Ischia (Latin: Dioecesis Isclana) is a Latin diocese of the Catholic Church in Campania, southern Italy. It is a suffragan of the Archdiocese of Naples. The diocese comprises the entire island of Ischia, which contains seven communes divided into two circumscriptions. In 1743, the population was about 4,000. The city of Ischia constituted one single parish, with two religious houses of men and one of women. In 2018, the population of the town of Ischia was 20,118.

== History ==
The earliest known Bishop of Ischia, Pietro, was present at the Third Lateran Council of Pope Alexander III in 1079.

In July 1228, a major earthquake struck the island of Ischia. Upwards of 700 persons were killed.

In imitation of the Sicilians and their revolt against Charles I of Naples (the Sicilian Vespers, 1282), Ischia revolted, but was reconquered by Charles' son, Charles II, in 1299, and four hundred of his troops were set loose to sack and burn the properties.

The cathedral, dedicated to the taking up (Assumption) of the Virgin Mary into heaven, is located in the Castello Aragonese, at the eastern tip of the island of Ischia. It is inaccessible except by a steep climb on foot. In 1848, the cathedral was served and administered by a Chapter, composed of three dignities (the Primicerius, the Archdeacon, and the Archpriest) and sixteen Canons. All the Canons were appointed by the cathedral's patron, the King of the Two Sicilies.

Bishop Luca Trapani (1698–1718) presided over a diocesan synod, held in the cathedral from 31 May to 2 June 1716.

The diocesan seminary was begun by Bishop Nicola Schiaffinati, O.E.S.A. (1739–1743), but was not completed until the reign of his successor, Bishop Felice Amato (1743–1764). In order to finance the operation of the seminary, two parishes were suppressed, Santa Barbara in the Castello Aragonese, and San Domenico in Campagnano.

On 23 July 1762, a major earthquake struck Ischia, without loss of life, but with the destruction of the parish church at Casamicciola. On 18 March 1796, another earthquake struck the same area, and seven people died.

The Concordat of 1818 between the Holy See (Papacy) and the Kingdom of the two Sicilies provided for the consolidation of the diocesan structure of the kingdom by the elimination of some fifty dioceses. Ischia, after nineteen years without a bishop, was specified as one of those dioceses, and it was to be united to the diocese of Pozzuoli. Strong representations made by a delegation of Ischiani to the King, however, brought the diocese a reprieve.

== Bishops ==
=== to 1800 ===
...

- Petrus (attested 1179)
- Amenius (attested 1206)

...

- Salvus (attested 1295)

...

- Petrus (attested 1306)

...

- Ugolinus de Auximo, O.P. (attested 1340)
- Guilelmus (died 1348)
- Thomasius (attested 1348)
- Jacobus (attested 1359)
- Bartolomeo Borsolari, O.E.S.A. (1359)
- Paulus Strina (1384–1389)
- Nicolaus Tinti, O.P. (1389–1418)
- Lorenzo de Ricci (1419–1435)
- Joannes de Sicilia, O.E.S.A. (1436–1453)
- Michele Cosal, O.Cist. (1453–1464)
- Joannes de Cicho (1464–1501)
- Bernardino de Leis, C.R.L. (1501–1504)
- Donatus Strineo (1504–1534)
- Agostino Falivenia (Pastineus), O.S.M. (1534–1548)
- Francisco Gutiérrez (bishop) (1548–1554)
- Virgilio Rosario (1554–1559)
- Filippo Geri (1560–1564)
- Fabio Polverone (1565–1589)
- Iñigo de Avalos, C.R. (1590–1635)
- Francesco Tontori (Tontolo), C.R.S. (1638–1663 Resigned)
- Giovanni Antonio de' Vecchi (1663–1672)
- Gerolamo Rocca (1672–1691)
- Michelangelo Cotignola (1692–1698 Resigned).
- Luca Trapani (1698–1718)
- Gianmaria Capecelatro, C.R.L. (1718–1738)
- Nicola Antonio Schiaffinati, O.E.S.A. (1739–1743 Died)
- Felice Amato (1743–1764 Died)
- Onofrio de Rossi (1764–1775)
- Sebastiano de Rosa (1775–1792)
- Pasquale Sansone (1792–1799)

=== since 1800 ===
Sede vacante (1799–1818)

- Giuseppe d'Amante (1818–1843 Died)
- Luigi Gagliardi (1845–1854 Resigned)
- Felice Romano (1854–1872 Died)
- Francesco di Nicola (1872–1885 Died)
- Gennaro Portanova (1885–1888)
- Giuseppe Candido (1888–1901 Resigned)
- Mario Palladino (1901–1913)
- Pasquale Ragosta (1914–1925)
- Ernesto de Laurentiis (1928–1956 Died)
- Antonio Cece (1956–1962)
- Dino Tomassini (1962–1970)
- Diego Parodi, M.C.C.I. (1980–1983 Died)
- Antonio Pagano (1983–1997 Retired)
- Filippo Strofaldi (1997–2012 Resigned)
- Pietro Lagnese (2013–2020 Appointed, Bishop of Caserta)
- Gennaro Pascarella (2021–present)

== Bibliography ==
=== Reference for bishops ===
- Gams, Pius Bonifatius (1873). Series episcoporum Ecclesiae catholicae: quotquot innotuerunt a beato Petro apostolo (in Latin). Ratisbon: Typis et Sumptibus Georgii Josephi Manz. p. 885.
- Eubel, Conradus, ed. (1913). Hierarchia catholica (in Latin). Vol. Tomus 1 (second ed.). Münster: Libreria Regensbergiana.
- Eubel, Conradus, ed. (1914). Hierarchia catholica (in Latin). Vol. Tomus 2 (second ed.). Münster: Libreria Regensbergiana.
- Gulik, Guilelmus (1923). Eubel, Conradus (ed.). Hierarchia catholica (in Latin). Vol. Tomus 3 (second ed.). Münster: Libreria Regensbergiana.
- Gauchat, Patritius (Patrice) (1935). Hierarchia catholica (in Latin). Vol. Tomus IV (1592-1667). Münster: Libraria Regensbergiana.
- Ritzler, Remigius; Sefrin, Pirminus (1952). Hierarchia catholica medii et recentis aevi V (1667-1730). Patavii: Messagero di S. Antonio.
- Ritzler, Remigius; Sefrin, Pirminus (1958). Hierarchia catholica medii et recentis aevi (in Latin). Vol. Tomus VI (1730-1799). Patavii: Messagero di S. Antonio.
- Ritzler, Remigius; Sefrin, Pirminus (1968). Hierarchia Catholica medii et recentioris aevi sive summorum pontificum, S. R. E. cardinalium, ecclesiarum antistitum series... A pontificatu Pii PP. VII (1800) usque ad pontificatum Gregorii PP. XVI (1846) (in Latin). Vol. VII. Monasterii: Libr. Regensburgiana.
- Remigius Ritzler; Pirminus Sefrin (1978). Hierarchia catholica Medii et recentioris aevi... A Pontificatu PII PP. IX (1846) usque ad Pontificatum Leonis PP. XIII (1903) (in Latin). Vol. VIII. Il Messaggero di S. Antonio.
- Pięta, Zenon (2002). Hierarchia catholica medii et recentioris aevi... A pontificatu Pii PP. X (1903) usque ad pontificatum Benedictii PP. XV (1922) (in Latin). Vol. IX. Padua: Messagero di San Antonio. ISBN 978-88-250-1000-8.

=== Studies ===
- Buonocore, O. (1926). La diocesi di Ischia Napoli. (in Italian)
- Buonocore, Onofrio (1948). La Diocesi d'Ischia dall'origine ad oggi (in Italian). Naples: Rispoli.
- Cappelletti, Giuseppe (1864). Le chiese d'Italia: dalla loro origine sino ai nostri giorni : opera (in Italian). Vol. decimonono (19). Venice: G. Antonelli. pp. 549–559.
- Kamp, Norbert (1975). Kirche und Monarchie im staufischen Königreich Sizilien: I. Prosopographische Grundlegung, Bistumer und Bistümer und Bischöfe des Konigreichs 1194–1266: 2. Apulien und Calabrien München: Wilhelm Fink 1975.
- Lopez, Pasquale (1991). Ischia e Pozzuoli: due diocesi nell'età della Controriforma (in Italian). Naples: A. Gallina editore.
- Scotti, Antonio (1848), "Ischia," in: Vincenzo D'Avino (1848). Cenni storici sulle chiese arcivescovili, vescovili, e prelatizie (nullius) del Regno delle Due Sicilie (in Italian). dalle stampe di Ranucci. pp. 269–271.
- Ughelli, Ferdinando; Coleti, Niccolo (1720). Italia sacra sive De episcopis Italiæ, et insularum adjacentium (in Latin). Vol. Tomus sextus (6). Venice: apud Sebastianum Coleti. pp. 230–242.
