= Giovanni Antonio de' Vecchi =

1xth-century Roman Catholic bishop

Most Reverend Giovanni Antonio de' Vecchi
- Bishop of Ischia
- Church: Catholic Church
- Diocese: Diocese of Ischia
- In office: 1663–1672
- Predecessor: Francesco Tontori
- Successor: Gerolamo Rocca

Orders
- Consecration: 18 Feb 1663 by Giulio Cesare Sacchetti

Personal details
- Died: Apr 1672

Giovanni Antonio de' Vecchi (died 1672) was a Roman Catholic prelate who served as Bishop of Ischia (1663–1672).

== Biography ==
On 12 Feb 1663, Giovanni Antonio de' Vecchi was appointed during the papacy of Pope Alexander VII as Bishop of Ischia. On 18 Feb 1663, he was consecrated bishop by Giulio Cesare Sacchetti, Cardinal-Bishop of Sabina. He served as Bishop of Ischia until his death in Apr 1672.

== External links and additional sources ==
- Cheney, David M. "Diocese of Ischia". Catholic-Hierarchy.org. (for Chronology of Bishops) ^{[self-published]}
- Chow, Gabriel. "Diocese of Ischia". GCatholic.org. (for Chronology of Bishops) ^{[self-published]}

Catholic Church titles
| Preceded by Francesco Tontori | Bishop of Ischia; 1663–1672 | Succeeded by Gerolamo Rocca |
