= Vatican obelisk =

Egyptian obelisk in St. Peter's Square, Vatican City

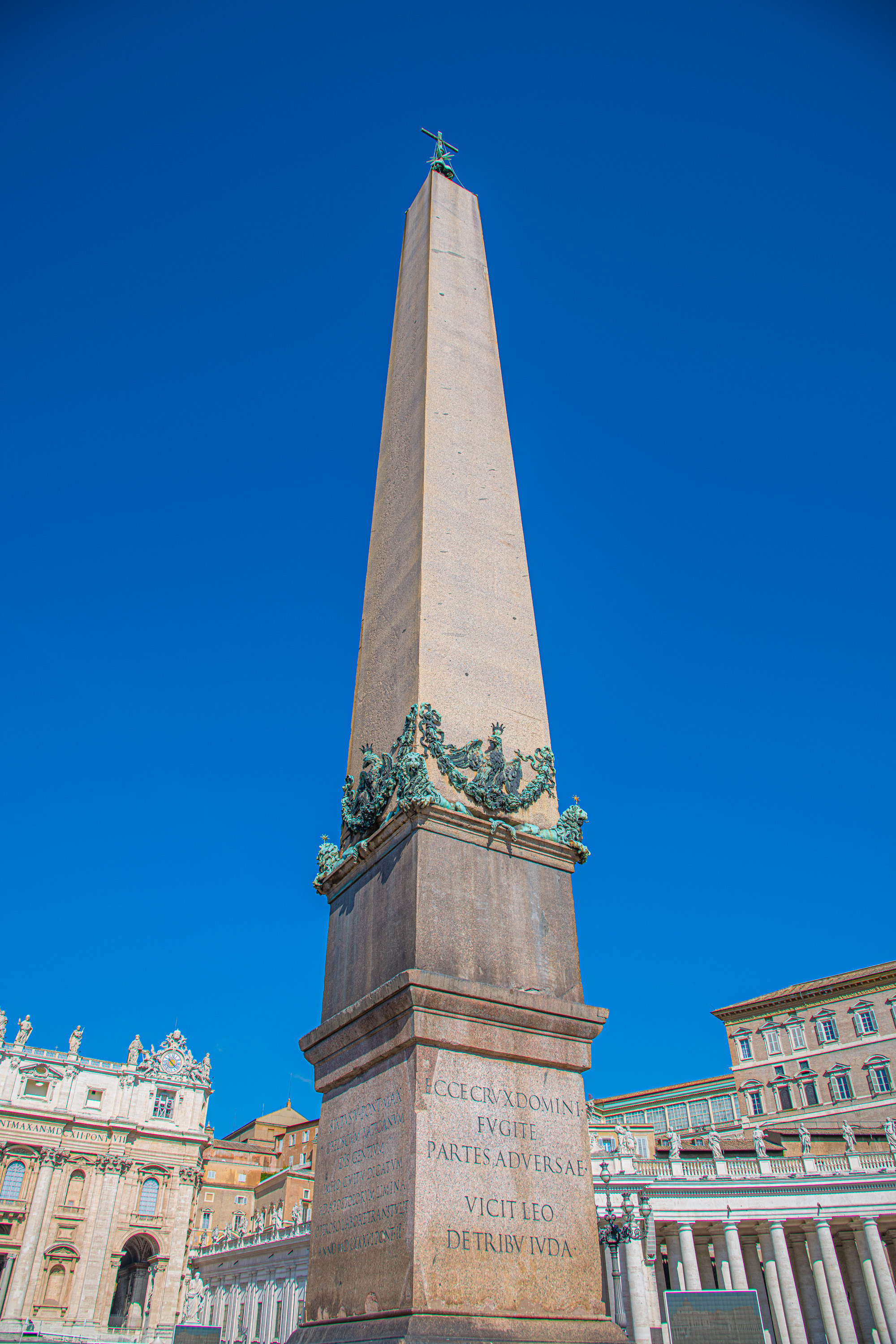
Vatican Obelisk

The Vatican Obelisk is an Egyptian obelisk, one of the thirteen ancient obelisks of Rome. This obelisk is located in St. Peter's Square, in Vatican City. It is the only ancient obelisk in Rome that has never fallen.

Made of red granite, it has a height of 25.3 meters and, together with the cross and the base (composed of four bronze lions, by Prospero Antichi), it reaches almost 40 meters.

It is of Egyptian origin, devoid of any hieroglyphs and titles. It is not known if the obelisk's inscriptions were erased before it was moved to Rome, or if it never had any. The obelisk comes, according to Pliny, from the city of Heliopolis on the Nile. Before coming to Rome, it stood at the Forum Iulii of Alexandria in Egypt. Emperor Caligula had it shipped to Rome in 40 AD, and placed it at the center of the Circus of Nero, the site of which is, in modern times, mostly in Vatican City. It remained in this position after the circus fell into disuse, occupied by a necropolis. In the 16th century it was moved next to the Old St. Peter's Basilica, at the Rotonda di Sant'Andrea.

== History ==
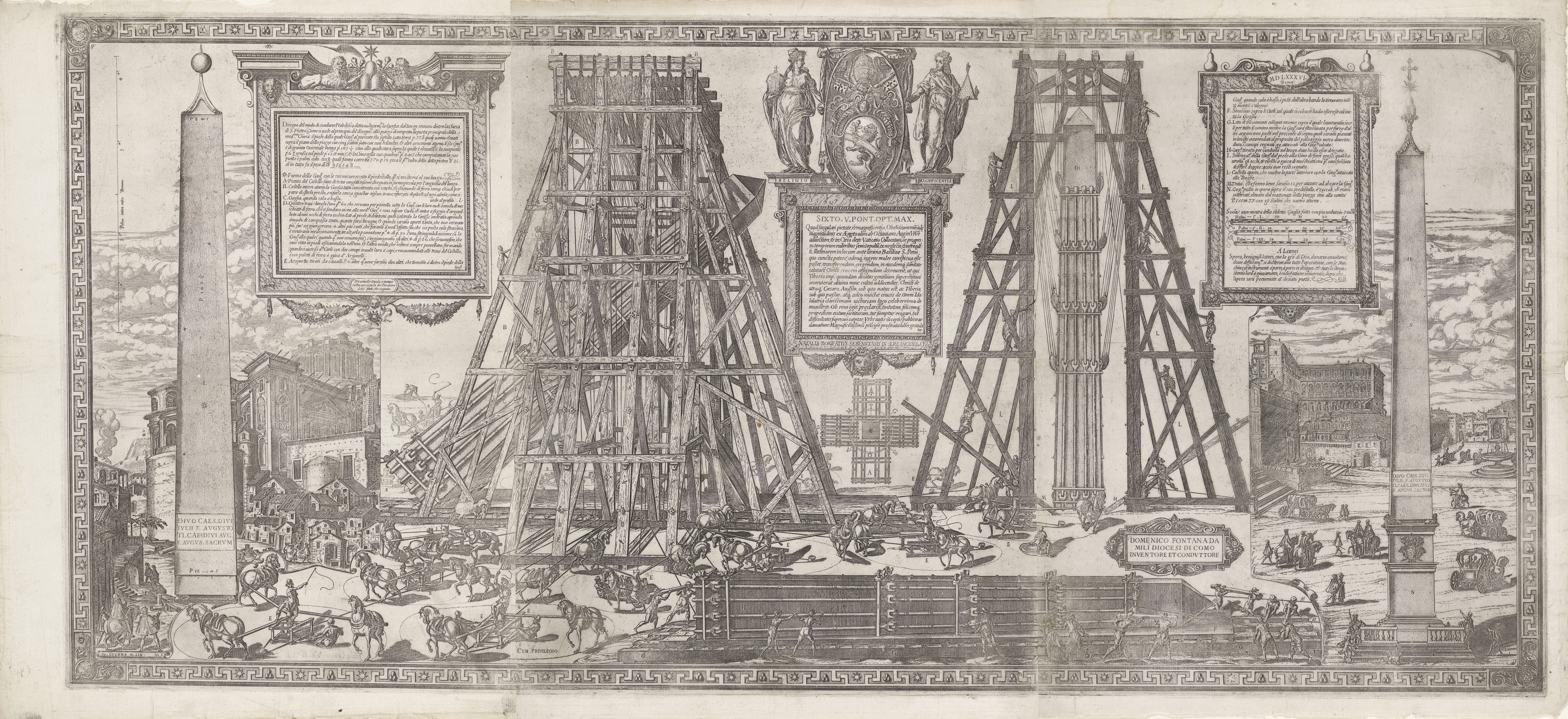
Moving of the obelisk - the left hand side shows the Obelisk topped by the globe, as it stood next to Old St. Peter's Basilica, the right hand side shows the Obelisk after its relocation, with the cross atop it.

Having stood in the same location in Rome since c.40 AD, it was moved 260 meters at the behest of Pope Sixtus V in a single day on September 10, 1586. The work was carried out under the direction of the architect Domenico Fontana who required thirteen months of preparatory work, 800 men, 160 horses and 45 winches to carry out the work. It was the first of Rome's ancient obelisks to be moved in modern times. During the move, there was a famous cry by sailor Benedetto Bresca: Acqua alle funi ("Water on the ropes!"), in order to avoid breaking the ropes that were about to give in under the great weight of the obelisk.

The idea of moving the obelisk was first raised by Pope Nicholas V. Sixtus V's relocation was considered to be a symbolic act, illustrating the triumph of Christianity over Paganism. Following the successful relocation, Fontana was commissioned to move three smaller obelisks in Rome.

A detailed account of the relocation was published in Della transportatione dell'obelisco Vaticano e delle fabriche di Sisto V (Rome, 1590). The astronomer Ignazio Danti is known to have assisted Fontana in this work.

According to a popular medieval legend, the ancient bronze globe that crowned the obelisk was believed to contain the ashes of Julius Caesar or Trajan. On the occasion of the obelisk's relocation, the globe was presented to the city by Sixtus V. It was placed first on the Marforio fountain, then in 1692 on the balustrade of the Piazza del Campidoglio. In 1848 it was brought into the Palazzo dei Conservatori.

The granting of a perpetual indulgence of ten years and as many quarantines to those who, in front of the obelisk, venerate the cross of Christ by reciting Lord's Prayer and Hail Mary, made it assumed that Sixtus V had placed in the great bronze cross installed on the obelisk a piece of the True Cross on September 26, 1586, albeit during a later restoration of the cross, no relic was found.

== Inscriptions ==
The obelisk and its base contain a number of inscriptions. Two ancient inscriptions at the base of the shaft describe its original dedication in Rome, four inscriptions on the pedestal composed by Cardinal Silvio Antoniano describe its rededication in 1586, and lower down, in smaller script, is an acknowledgement of Domenico Fontana's role in the moving of the obelisk.

	Obelisk shaft	South (base)	North (base)	East (base)	West (base)	North (base, lower)
Latin	DIVO CAESARI DIVI F AVGVSTO TI CAESARI DIVI AVGVSTI F AVGVSTO SACRVM	SIXTVS V PONT MAX / OBELISCVM VATICANVM / DIS GENTIVM / IMPIO CVLTV DICATVM / AD APOSTOLORVM LIMINA / OPEROSO LABORE TRANSTVLIT / ANNO M D LXXXVI PONT II	SIXTVS V PONT MAX / CRUCI INVICTAE / OBELISCVM VATICANVM / AB IMPVRA SVPERSTITIONE / EXPIATVM IVSTIVS / ET FELICIVS CONSECRAVIT / ANNO MDLXXXVI PONT II	ECCE CRVX DOMINI / FVGITE / PARTES ADVERSAE / VICIT LEO / DE TRIBV IVDA	CHRISTVS VINCIT / CHRISTVS REGNAT / CHRISTVS IMPERAT / CHRISTVS AB OMNI MALO / PLEBEM SVAM / DEFENDAT	DOMINICVS FONTANA EX PAGO MILI / AGRI NOVOCOMENSIS TRANSTVLIT / ET EREXIT
English translation	Sacred to the Divine Caesar Augustus, son of the Divine, to Tiberius Caesar Augustus, son of the Divine Augustus	Sixtus V, Pontifex Maximus, by a laborious task, transferred to the threshold of the Apostles the Vatican obelisk, dedicated in impious reverence to the gods of the heathen, in the year 1586, the second of his pontificate	Sixtus V, Pontifex Maximus, consecrated to the invincible cross the Vatican obelisk, expiated of impure superstition, in the year 1586, the second of his pontificate	Behold, the Cross of the Lord. Take flight hostile ranks, the Lion of Judah, has conquered	Christ conquers. Christ reigns. Christ commands. May Christ defend his people from all evil	Domenico Fontana, of the town of Mili in the territory of Como, moved and erected this

== Gallery ==
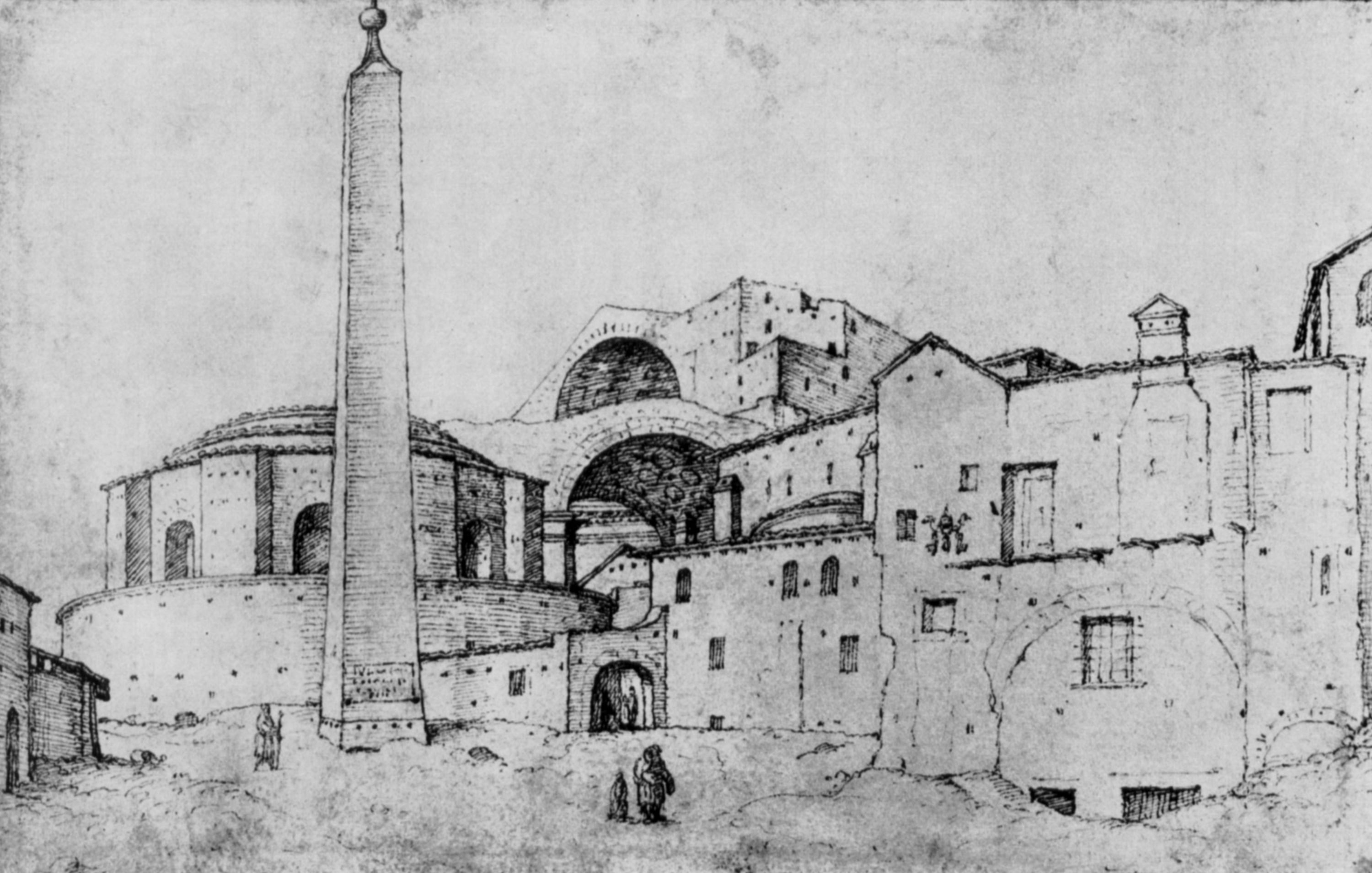
The obelisk in the Circus of Nero Maarten van Heemskerck, 1532

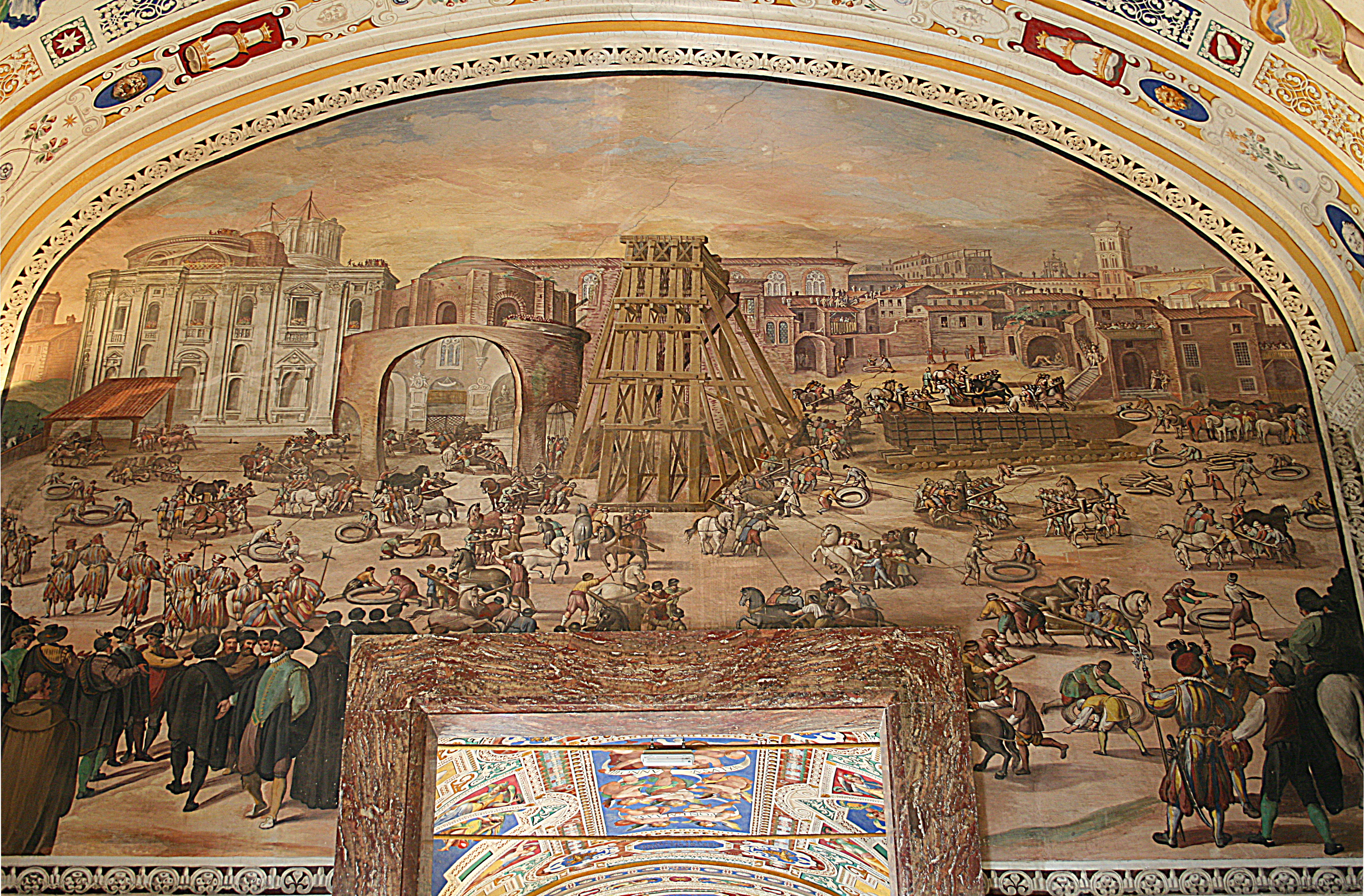
Mural (1585–1588) in the Vatican Library of the re-erection in St. Peter's Square

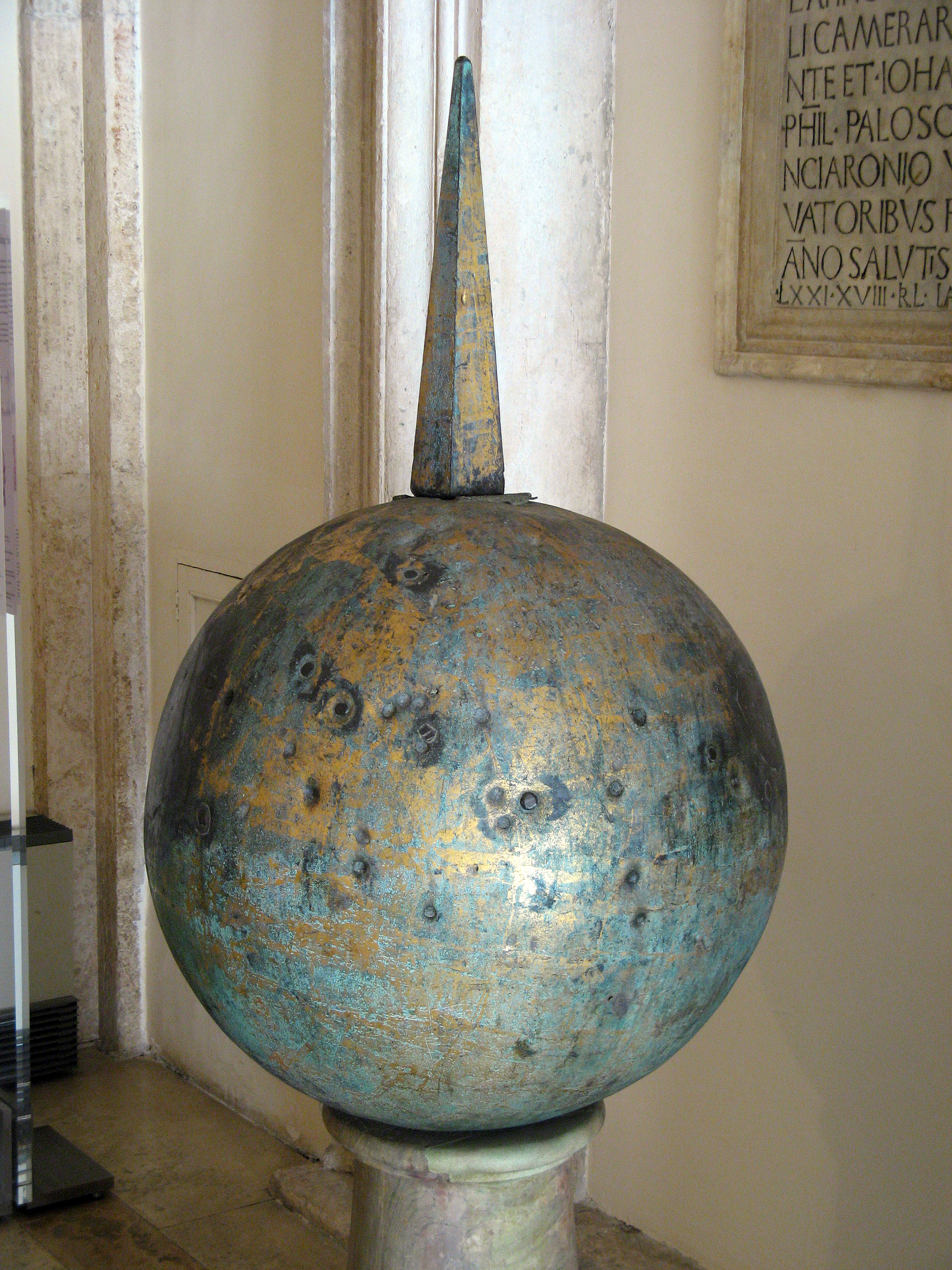
Bronze globe and spike from the top of the obelisk, now in the Capitoline Museums

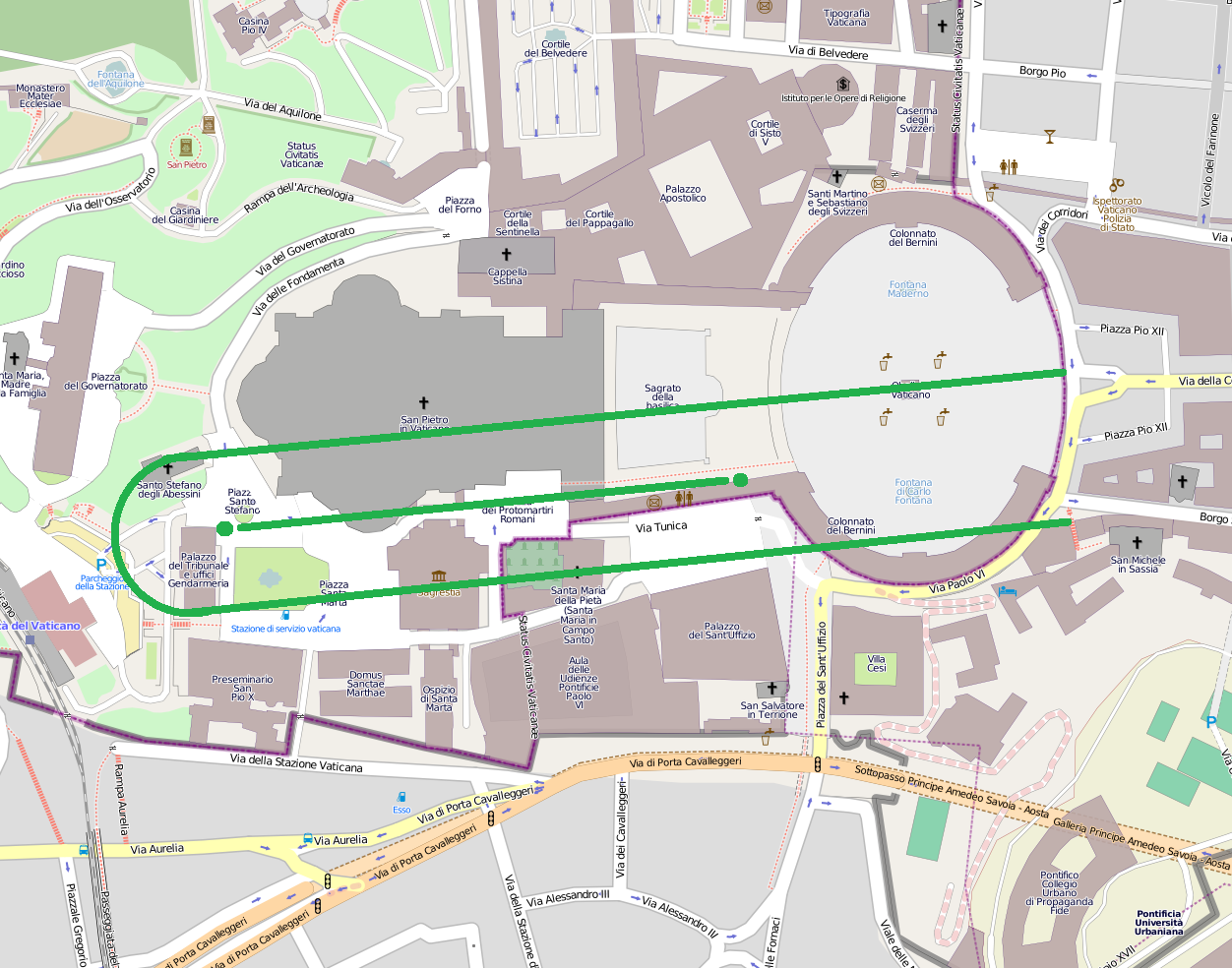
One possible modern interpretation

== Bibliography ==
- Armin Wirsching, Obelisken transportieren und aufrichten in Aegypten und in Rom, Norderstedt 2007, 3rd. ed. 2013 ISBN 978-3-8334-8513-8
- L'Italia. Roma (guida rossa), Touring Club Italiano, Milano 2004
- Cesare D'Onofrio, Gli obelischi di Roma, Bulzoni, 1967
