= San Salvatore in Lauro =

- Church of the Holy Saviour in the Laurels
- Chiesa di San Salvatore in Lauro
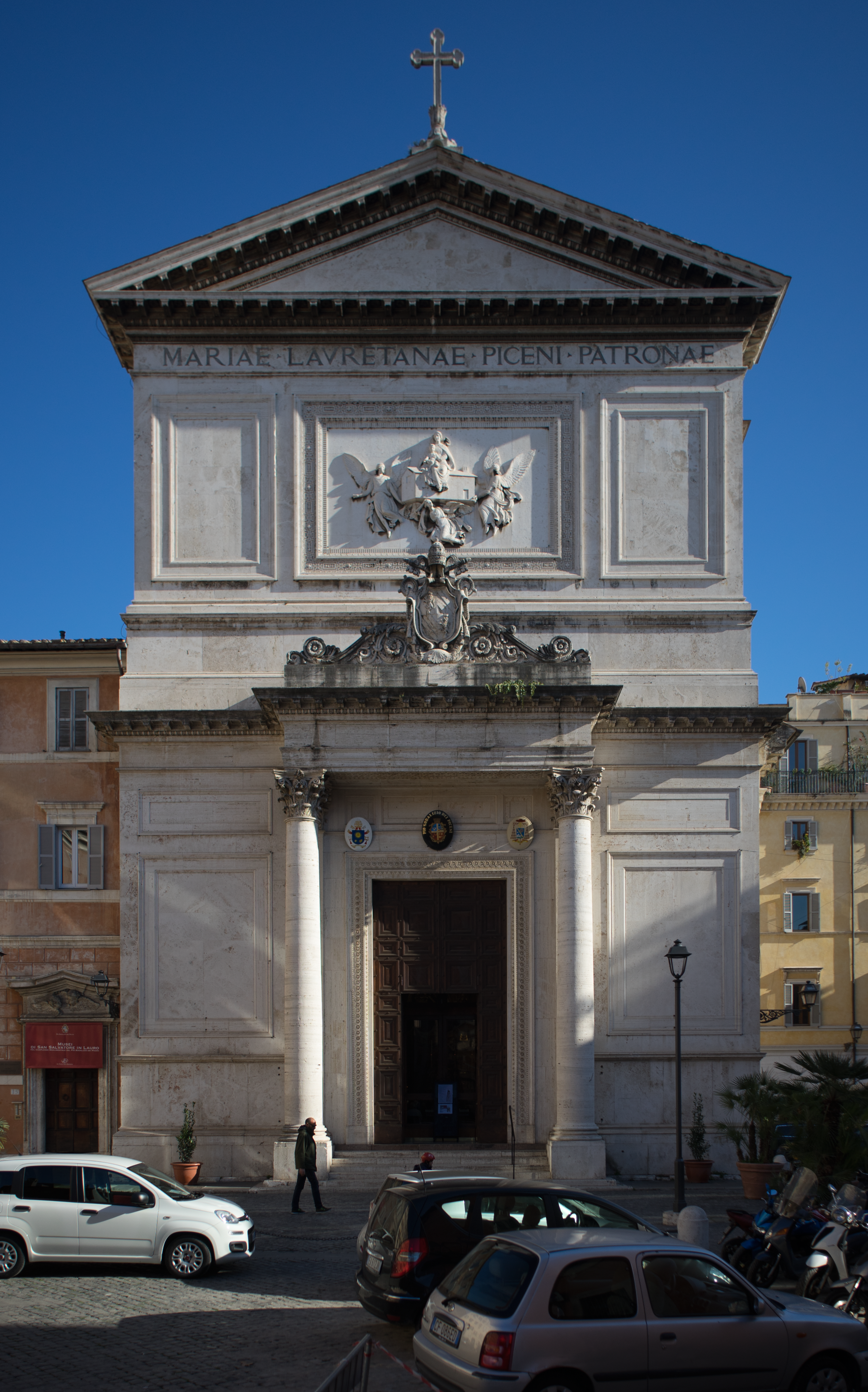
- Facade
- Click on the map for a fullscreen view
- 41°54′02.78″N 12°28′10.50″E
- Location: Piazza di San Salvatore in Lauro, Rome
- Country: Italy
- Language: Italian
- Denomination: Catholic
- Tradition: Roman Rite
- Website: sansalvatoreinlauro.org

History
- Status: titular church regional church
- Founded: 11th century
- Dedication: Jesus (as Saviour)

Architecture
- Architect(s): Ottaviano Mascherino, Ludovico Rusconi Sassi
- Architectural type: Baroque
- Completed: 19th century

Administration
- Diocese: Rome

San Salvatore in Lauro is a Catholic church in central Rome, Italy. It is located on a piazza of the same name in the rione Ponte. It stands on Via Vecchiarelli, just south of the Lungotevere Tor di Nona and north of via dei Coronari. It is the "national church" of the marchigiani, the inhabitants of the Marches, region of Italy (the population of each of Italy's regions was counted as a "nation" before Italian unification). The protector of this titulus is currently Cardinal-Priest Angelo Comastri, from 2007 a Cardinal-Deacon but after ten years promoted, as is customary, to the rank of cardinal-priest, on 19 May 2018. The Cardinal served previously, in 1996–2005, as |Archbishop-Prelate of Loreto.

== History ==
The oldest attestation of the church has it built on the ruins of an ancient pagan temple dedicated to the goddess Europa and surrounded by laurel trees. The first church at the site dates to the 11th century. It was rebuilt around 1450 by Cardinal Latino Orsini, as a chapel for a monastery he established next door, and in which he installed the Canons Regular of San Giorgio in Alga.

The church was destroyed in a fire in 1591. The present building was constructed starting in 1594 on designs of the Bolognese Ottaviano Mascherino. San Salvatore in Lauro has been the Sanctuary of the Madonna di Loreto in Rome since 1600.

Pope Innocent X granted pontifical decrees of canonical coronation to both venerated Marian images enshrine inside the church, The first image was the statue of Our Lady of Loreto which was crowned in 1644 and the painting of the Madonna delle Grazie which was crowned in 1654.

== Architecture ==
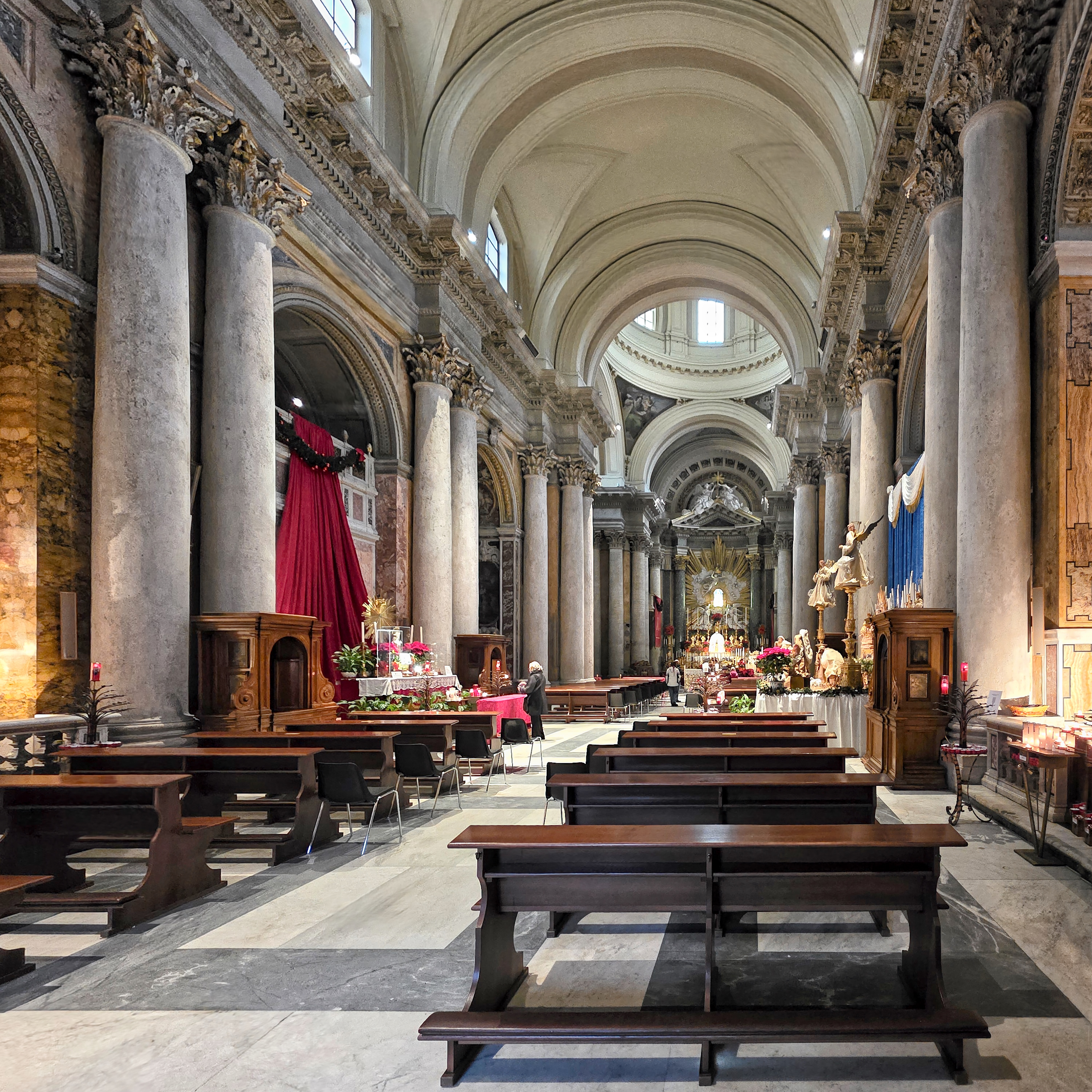
Nave

The façade, faced in travertine, was finished only in 1862 by the architect Camillo Guglielmetti, winner of the competition organized by the Accademia di San Luca. The relief over the portal is by Rinaldo Rinaldi, and depicts the Traslazione della S.Casa di Loreto. The frieze above it indicates that the church was dedicated to "To Mary of Loreto, Patroness of the Picenese".

== Interior ==
The church is in the plan of a Latin cross, with a barrel-vaulted ceiling. The main altarpiece and cupola are painted by Ludovico Rusconi Sassi.

=== Chapels ===
- The Chapel of St. Peter is the first chapel on the left upon entering the church.
- The Chapel of St. Joseph is next.
- The third chapel is dedicated to St. Lutgard.
- The Chapel of the Holy House is in the left transept and dedicated to Our Lady of Loreto.
- The Chapel of the saints of the Marches is at the end of the right transept.
- In the Chapel of the Nativity is a Nativity by Pietro da Cortona.
- The Chapel of the Crucifix contains a life-sized wooden sculpture of Christ carrying his cross.
- The second chapel on the right is dedicated to St Charles Borromeo. The Madonna and Child altarpiece is by Alessandro Turchi.
- The Cappella Pavoni is at the right of the entrance, and dedicated to Our Lady of Sorrows.

The refectory has a series of Mannerist frescoes (1550) by Francesco Salviati (1550). Parmigianino's Vision of Saint Jerome was commissioned for a chapel in the church, but was later brought away by the donors and is now in the National Gallery, London.

The tomb of Pope Eugene IV attributed to Isaia da Pisa is located in the cloister.

The titular church was first established in 1587 as a Cardinal-Priest title but was suppressed in 1670. In the consistory of 24 November 2007 Pope Benedict XVI restored the church as a Cardinal-Deaconry.

== List of Cardinal Protectors ==
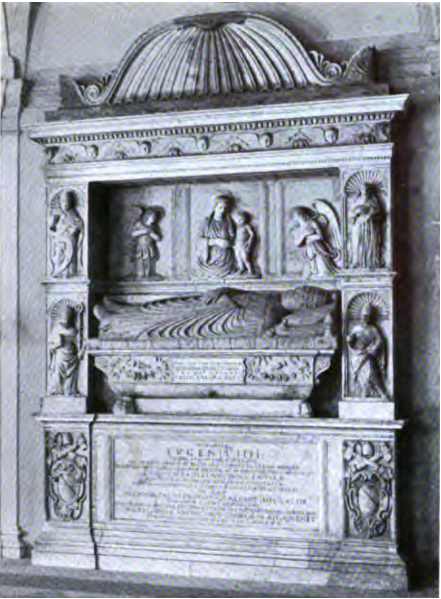
The tomb of Pope Eugene IV transferred from S. Peter's

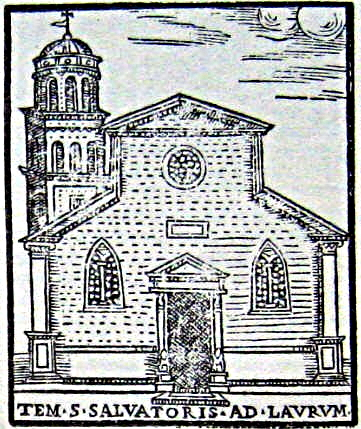
1588 engraving of San Salvatore in Lauro

- Scipione Lancelotti (20 April 1587 – 2 June 1598)
- Silvio Antoniano (17 March 1599 – 16 August 1603)
- Séraphin Olivier-Razali (25 June 1604 – 10 February 1609)
- Orazio Lancellotti (12 September 1611 – 9 December 1620)
- Pietro Valier (3 March 1621 – 18 March 1624)
- Luca Antonio Virili (17 December 1629 – 4 June 1634)
- Ciriaco Rocci (13 August 1635 – 25 September 1651)
- Pietro Vito Ottoboni (19 February 1652 – 15 November 1660)
- Francesco Maria Sforza Pallavicino (6 December 1660 – 5 June 1667)
- Giovanni Dolfin (18 July 1667 – 19 May 1670)
- Suspended
- Angelo Comastri (24 November 2007 –)

== See also ==
- 17th-century Western domes
