= Luca Antonio Virili =

Italian Catholic cardinal

His Eminence Luca Antonio Virili
- Cardinal-Priest of San Salvatore in Lauro
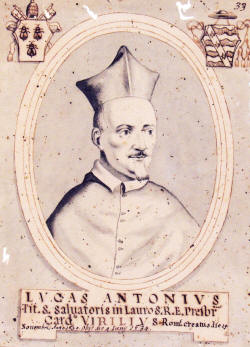
- Church: Catholic Church
- Appointed: 17 December 1629
- Term ended: 4 June 1634
- Predecessor: Pietro Valier
- Successor: Ciriaco Rocci

Orders
- Created cardinal: 19 November 1629 by Pope Urban VIII

Personal details
- Born: 1569; Rome, Papal States
- Died: 4 June 1634 (aged 64–65)

Luca Antonio Virili (1569 – 4 June 1634) was an Italian Roman Catholic cardinal.
