= Lelio Biscia =

- Cardinal-Priest of Santa Maria del Popolo
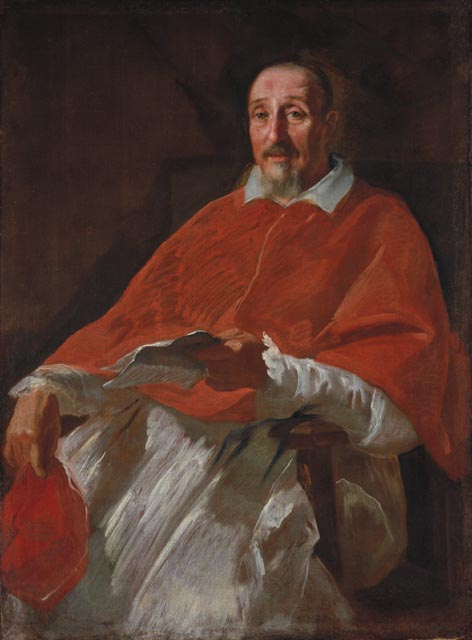
- Lelio Biscia painted by Andrea Sacchi, c. 1630, National Gallery of Canada, Ottawa
- Church: Catholic Church
- See: Santa Maria del Popolo
- In office: 9 February 1637 – 19 November 1638
- Predecessor: Guido Bentivoglio
- Successor: Lelio Falconieri
- Previous posts: Cardinal-Deacon of Santa Maria in Cosmedin (1633-1637); Cardinal-Deacon of Santi Vito, Modesto e Crescenzia (1626-1633)

Orders
- Created cardinal: 19 January 1626 by Pope Urban VIII

Personal details
- Born: 15 June 1575 Rome, Papal States
- Died: 19 November 1638 (aged 63) Rome, Papal States

Lelio Biscia (15 June 1575 – 19 November 1638) was an Italian Catholic cardinal.

== Early life ==
Biscia was born on 15 June 1575 in Rome, the second son of Bernardino Biscia and Vittoria Scapucci. Biscia's father was a minor noble and a consistorial lawyer. Biscia followed his father and received legal education before becoming a consistorial lawyer himself at the age of 20.

== Ecclesiastic career ==
He became a referendary of the Tribunals of the Apostolic Signature of Justice and of Grace and in 1600 he purchased a position as cleric to the Apostolic Chamber. He was appointed governor of Civitavecchia for a year, between 1605 and 1606 and then again between 1609 and 1610. Soon after he was appointed dean of the Apostolic Chamber.

Biscia was known as a great collector of books and manuscripts. In 1622, he employed theologian Leo Allatius to curate his personal library, considered to have been one of the most extensive of its day. Allatius later became Vatican librarian. He was also a patron of mathematician and scientist Benedetto Castelli.

== Cardinalate ==
Biscia was elevated to cardinal by Pope Urban VIII on 19 January 1626 and was appointed cardinal-deacon of the church of Santi Vito, Modesto e Crescenzia the following month.

In 1633 he was appointed cardinal-deacon of the church of Santa Maria in Cosmedin and then in 1637 he was appointed cardinal-priest of Santa Maria del Popolo.

He died in Rome on 19 November 1638 after a week spent suffering severe erysipelas.
