= Cardinal electors for the March–April 1605 conclave =

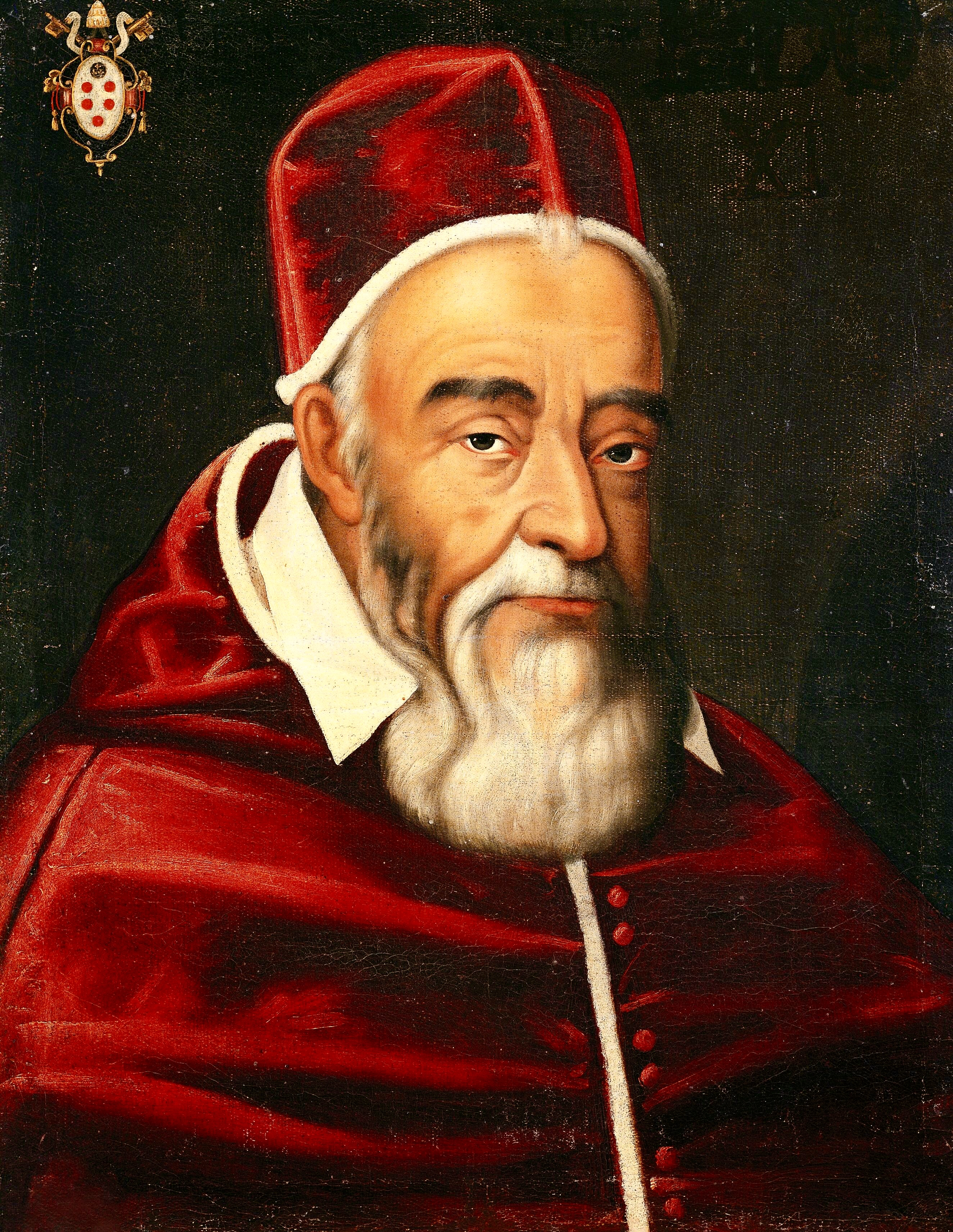
Alessandro de' Medici, the cardinal bishop of Palestrina, was elected Pope Leo XI on 1 April 1605.

The papal conclave of March–April 1605 was convened on the death of Pope Clement VIII and ended with the election of Alessandro de' Medici as Pope Leo XI on 1 April 1605. It was the first of two papal conclaves in 1605, with Leo dying on 27 April 1605, twenty-six days after he was elected, and the papal conclave to elect his successor being held in May. The conclave saw conflict regarding whether Cesare Baronius should be elected pope, and Philip III of Spain, the Spanish king, excluded both Baronius and the eventually successful candidate, Medici. Philip's exclusion of Medici was announced by Cardinal Ávila after his election to the papacy, and the other cardinals did not view it as valid since Medici had already been elected pope.

Pope Nicholas II had reserved the right to elect the pope to the cardinal bishops, priests, and deacons of Rome in 1059. The cardinal bishops were the highest rank, being the bishops of the ancient suburbicarian dioceses, the priests ranked next, who served as the titular head of historically important churches in Rome, and last ranked the cardinal deacons, who were nominally assigned one of the ancient diaconia where traditionally deacons had administered the temporal property of the Church of Rome. Cardinals were required to have been ordained at least to the rank of their order within the College of Cardinals, but could also be ordained to a higher order as well.

In 1586, Pope Sixtus V mandated that the maximum number of cardinals would be seventy. Of these, the College of Cardinals had sixty-nine total members at the time of Clement VIII's death, but only sixty were present for the first conclave of 1605 when it opened, and sixty-one total electors were present for the election of Leo XI. The electors present had been created by six different popes: Pius IV, Gregory XIII, Sixtus V, Gregory XIV, Innocent IX, and Clement VIII. Of these, Clement's creations were the most numerous, having created thirty-eight of the cardinal electors. Innocent IX had created one of the conclave's electors, Gregory XIV had created five, Sixtus V had created eleven, Gregory XIII had created four, and Pius IV had created one. (Note: Pastor lists Gregory XIII as having six electors, attributing Bernerio and Pinelli to him, and Sixtus V as having nine. Eubel counts them as being created by Sixtus V, and gives specific dates for their creations as cardinals.)

Pietro Aldobrandini, the cardinal-nephew of Clement VIII, was the elector who controlled the largest number of votes with twenty-two of Clement's thirty-eight creations following his instructions. Alessandro Peretti di Montalto, the nephew of Sixtus V, controlled eight votes. Thirteen of the cardinal electors were loyal to the Spanish monarchy, and these electors and the faction loyal to Montalto were aligned. In addition to these groups, eight of the electors formed a faction that were loyal to the French crown.

== List of cardinal electors ==
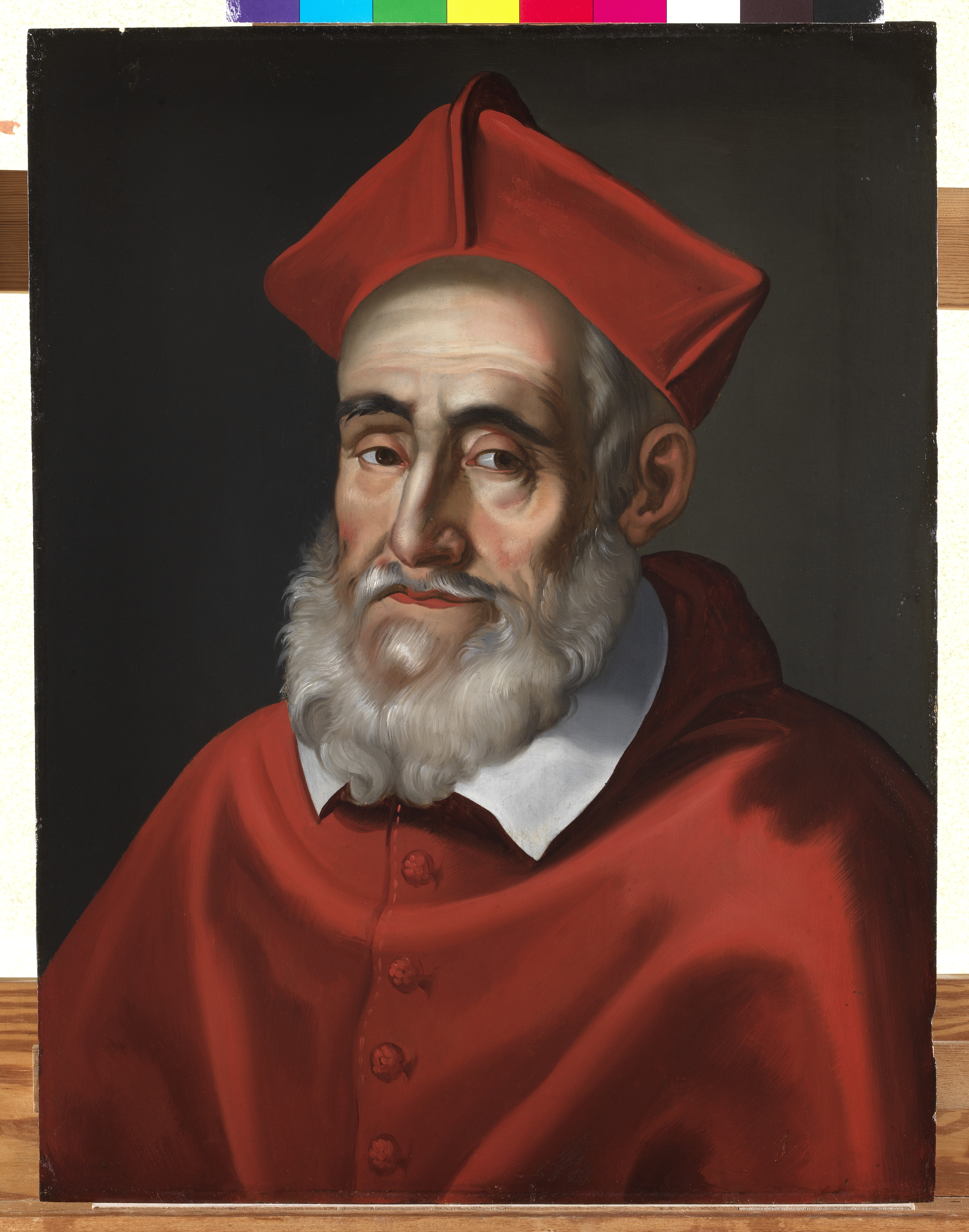
Caesar Baronius was one of the leading candidates in the March 1605 conclave, but was excluded by the Spanish monarchy.

Name	Rank (Note: Refers to rank within the College of Cardinals, and is not reflective of whether or not the individual had been ordained or consecrated to other Holy Orders)	Created cardinal by	Nationality	Sources
Tolomeo Gallio	Bishop	Pius IV	Italian	
Alessandro Ottaviano de' Medici (Note: Elected Pope Leo XI)	Bishop	Gregory XIII	Italian	
François de Joyeuse	Bishop	Gregory XIII	French	
Domenico Pinelli	Bishop	Sixtus V (Note: Pastor lists as a creation of Gregory XIII, but Eubel lists as created by Sixtus V.)	Italian	
Girolamo Bernerio	Bishop	Sixtus V	Italian	
Agostino Valier	Priest	Gregory XIII	Italian	
Antonio Maria Gallo	Priest	Sixtus V	Italian	
Antonmaria Sauli	Priest	Sixtus V	Italian	
Benedetto Giustiniani	Priest	Sixtus V	Italian	
Giovanni Evangelista Pallotta	Priest	Sixtus V	Italian	
Federico Borromeo	Priest	Sixtus V	Italian	
Francesco Maria del Monte	Priest	Sixtus V	Italian	
Gregorio Petrocchini	Priest	Sixtus V	Italian	
Mariano Pierbenedetti	Priest	Sixtus V	Italian	
Paolo Emilio Sfondrati	Priest	Gregory XIV	Italian	
Ottavio Paravicini	Priest	Gregory XIV	Italian	
Ottavio Acquaviva d'Aragona	Priest	Gregory XIV	Italian	
Flaminio Piatti	Priest	Gregory XIV	Italian	
Giovanni Antonio Facchinetti de Nuce (Note: Not Pope Innocent IX, born Giovanni Antonio Facchinetti, who died in 1591)	Priest	Innocent IX	Italian	
Pietro Aldobrandini	Priest	Clement VIII	Italian	
Francesco Maria Tarugi	Priest	Clement VIII	Italian	
Ottavio Bandini	Priest	Clement VIII	Italian	
Anne d'Escars de Givry	Priest	Clement VIII	French	
Giovanni Francesco Biandrate di San Giorgio Aldobrandini	Priest	Clement VIII	Italian	
Camillo Borghese	Priest	Clement VIII	Italian	
Caesar Baronius	Priest	Clement VIII	Italian	
Lorenzo Bianchetti	Priest	Clement VIII	Italian	
Francisco de Ávila	Priest	Clement VIII	Spanish	
Francesco Mantica	Priest	Clement VIII	Italian	
Pompeio Arrigoni	Priest	Clement VIII	Italian	
Bonifazio Bevilacqua Aldobrandini	Priest	Clement VIII	Italian	
Alfonso Visconti	Priest	Clement VIII	Italian	
Domenico Toschi	Priest	Clement VIII	Italian	
Girolamo Agucchi	Priest	Clement VIII	Italian	
Paolo Emilio Zacchia	Priest	Clement VIII	Italian	
Franz von Dietrichstein (Note: Entered the conclave on 19 March 1605)	Priest	Clement VIII	German (Note: Dietrichstein had a Spanish mother; some sources also describe him as Czech.)	
Robert Bellarmine	Priest	Clement VIII	Italian	
François de Sourdis	Priest	Clement VIII	French	
Séraphin Olivier-Razali	Priest	Clement VIII	French	
Filippo Spinelli	Priest	Clement VIII	Italian	
Carlo Conti	Priest	Clement VIII	Italian	
Carlo Gaudenzio Madruzzo	Priest	Clement VIII	German (Note: Madruzzo was bishop of Trent, in modern Italy. Gauchat classifies him as German, and does not simply list the city as he does for Italians.)	
Jacques Davy Duperron	Priest	Clement VIII	French	
Innocenzo del Bufalo-Cancellieri	Priest	Clement VIII	Italian	
Giovanni Delfino	Priest	Clement VIII	Italian	
Giacomo Sannesio	Priest	Clement VIII	Italian	
Girolamo Pamphili	Priest	Clement VIII	Italian	
Ferdinando Taverna	Priest	Clement VIII	Italian	
Anselmo Marzato	Priest	Clement VIII	Italian	
Erminio Valenti	Priest	Clement VIII	Italian	
Francesco Sforza	Deacon	Gregory XIII	Italian	
Alessandro Peretti di Montalto	Deacon	Sixtus V	Italian	
Odoardo Farnese	Deacon	Gregory XIV	Italian	
Cinzio Passeri Aldobrandini	Deacon	Clement VIII	Italian	
Bartolomeo Cesi	Deacon	Clement VIII	Italian	
Andrea Baroni Peretti Montalto	Deacon	Clement VIII	Italian	
Alessandro d'Este	Deacon	Clement VIII	Italian	
Giovanni Battista Deti	Deacon	Clement VIII	Italian	
Silvestro Aldobrandini	Deacon	Clement VIII	Italian	
Giovanni Andrea Doria	Deacon	Clement VIII	Italian	
Carlo Emanuele Pio di Savoia	Deacon	Clement VIII	Italian	
