= Cardinal electors for the May 1605 conclave =

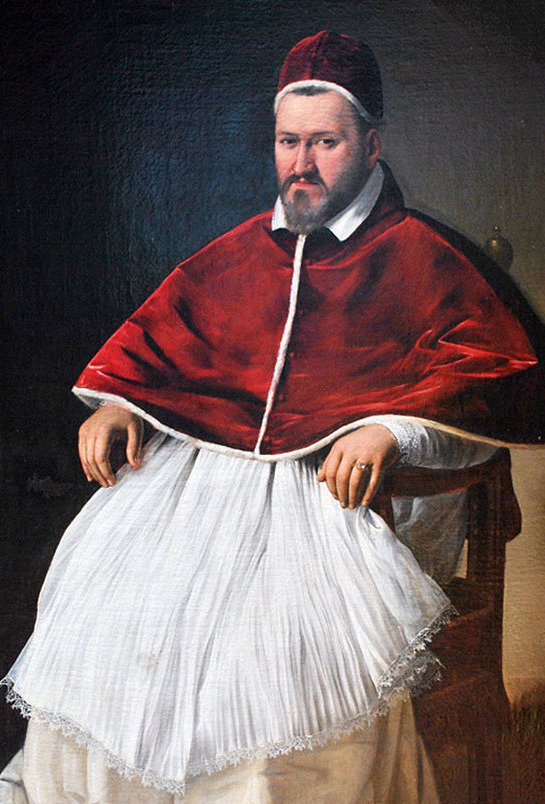
Camillo Borghese, considered too young for the papacy in the March 1605 conclave, was elected Pope Paul V on 16 May 1605.

The papal conclave of May 1605 was convened on the death of Pope Leo XI and ended with the election of Camillo Borghese as Pope Paul V on 16 May 1605. It was the second of two papal conclaves in 1605, with Leo dying on 27 April 1605, twenty-six days after he was elected in the March–April 1605 conclave.

Pope Nicholas II had reserved the right to elect the pope to the cardinal bishops, priests, and deacons of Rome in 1059. The cardinal bishops were the highest rank, being the bishops of the ancient suburbicarian dioceses. Cardinal priests ranked next, serving as the titular head of historically important churches in Rome. Last ranked the cardinal deacons, who were nominally assigned one of the ancient diaconia where traditionally deacons had administered the material possessions of the Church of Rome. Cardinals were required to have been ordained at least to the rank of their order within the College of Cardinals, but could also be ordained to a higher order.

In 1586, Pope Sixtus V had mandated that the maximum number of cardinals be seventy. Of these, the College of Cardinals had sixty-nine total members at the time of Clement VIII's death. Following Leo's election, Girolamo Agucchi had also died on 27 April, the same day as Leo, reducing the total number of cardinals in the college by two. The electors present had been created by six different popes: Pius IV, Gregory XIII, Sixtus V, Gregory XIV, Innocent IX, and Clement VIII. Clement's creations were the most numerous, as he had created thirty-nine of the cardinal electors. Innocent IX had created one of the conclave's electors, Gregory XIV had created five, Sixtus V had created eleven, Gregory XIII had created three, and Pius IV had created one. (Note: Pastor attributes Bernerio and Pinelli as creations of Gregory XIII. Eubel counts them as being created by Sixtus V, and gives specific dates for their creations as cardinals. These numbers use Eubel and Gauchet's figures, and note where Pastor disagrees. See table for specific creations and sourcing.)

== Cardinal electors ==
Fifty-nine total cardinals entered the conclave, and Paolo Emilio Zacchia and Carlo Gaudenzio Madruzzo participated in the conclave, assenting to the final vote, but did not enter the proceedings because they were sick.

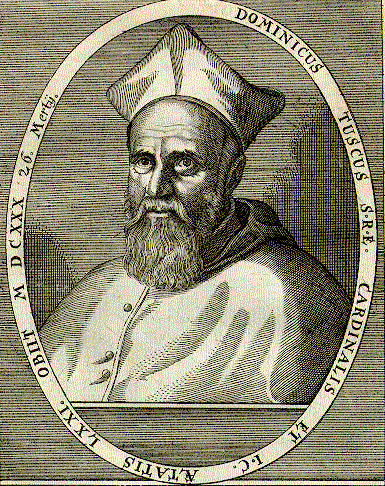
Domenico Toschi was one of the leading candidates in the May 1605 conclave, but ultimately failed to win election after Caesar Baronius objected to his use of vulgar language.

Name	Rank (Note: Refers to rank within the College of Cardinals, and is not reflective of whether or not the individual had been ordained or consecrated to other Holy Orders)	Created cardinal by	Nationality	Sources
Tolomeo Gallio	Bishop	Pius IV	Italian	
François de Joyeuse	Bishop	Gregory XIII	French	
Domenico Pinelli	Bishop	Sixtus V (Note: Pastor lists as a creation of Gregory XIII, but Eubel lists as created by Sixtus V.)	Italian	
Girolamo Bernerio	Bishop	Sixtus V	Italian	
Agostino Valier	Priest	Gregory XIII	Italian	
Antonio Maria Gallo	Priest	Sixtus V	Italian	
Antonmaria Sauli	Priest	Sixtus V	Italian	
Benedetto Giustiniani	Priest	Sixtus V	Italian	
Giovanni Evangelista Pallotta	Priest	Sixtus V	Italian	
Federico Borromeo	Priest	Sixtus V	Italian	
Francesco Maria del Monte	Priest	Sixtus V	Italian	
Gregorio Petrocchini	Priest	Sixtus V	Italian	
Mariano Pierbenedetti	Priest	Sixtus V	Italian	
Paolo Emilio Sfondrati	Priest	Gregory XIV	Italian	
Ottavio Paravicini	Priest	Gregory XIV	Italian	
Ottavio d'Aquaviva d'Aragona	Priest	Gregory XIV	Italian	
Flaminio Piatti	Priest	Gregory XIV	Italian	
Giovanni Antonio Facchinetti de Nuce (Note: Not Pope Innocent IX, who was born with the same name and died in 1591)	Priest	Innocent IX	Italian	
Pietro Aldobrandini	Priest	Clement VIII	Italian	
Francesco Maria Tarugi	Priest	Clement VIII	Italian	
Ottavio Bandini	Priest	Clement VIII	Italian	
Anne d'Escars de Givry	Priest	Clement VIII	French	
Giovanni Francesco Biandrate di San Giorgio Aldobrandini	Priest	Clement VIII	Italian	
Camillo Borghese (Note: Elected Pope Paul V.)	Priest	Clement VIII	Italian	
Caesar Baronius	Priest	Clement VIII	Italian	
Lorenzo Bianchetti	Priest	Clement VIII	Italian	
Francisco de Ávila	Priest	Clement VIII	Spanish	
Francesco Mantica	Priest	Clement VIII	Italian	
Pompeio Arrigoni	Priest	Clement VIII	Italian	
Bonifazio Bevilacqua Aldobrandini	Priest	Clement VIII	Italian	
Alfonso Visconti	Priest	Clement VIII	Italian	
Domenico Toschi	Priest	Clement VIII	Italian	
Paolo Emilio Zacchia (Note: Did not physically enter the conclave for health reasons.)	Priest	Clement VIII	Italian	
Franz von Dietrichstein	Priest	Clement VIII	German (Note: Dietrichstein was bishop of Olomouc–Olmütz in Moravia (modern Czech Republic). Gauchat classifies him as German.)	
Robert Bellarmine	Priest	Clement VIII	Italian	
François de Sourdis	Priest	Clement VIII	French	
Séraphin Olivier-Razali	Priest	Clement VIII	French	
Domenico Ginnasi	Priest	Clement VIII	Italian	
Antonio Zapata y Cisneros	Priest	Clement VIII	Spanish	
Filippo Spinelli	Priest	Clement VIII	Italian	
Carlo Conti	Priest	Clement VIII	Italian	
Carlo Gaudenzio Madruzzo	Priest	Clement VIII	German (Note: Madruzzo was bishop of Trent, in modern Italy. Gauchat classifies him as German, and does not simply list the city as he does for Italians.)	
Jacques Davy Duperron	Priest	Clement VIII	French	
Innocenzo del Bufalo-Cancellieri	Priest	Clement VIII	Italian	
Giovanni Delfino	Priest	Clement VIII	Italian	
Giacomo Sannesio	Priest	Clement VIII	Italian	
Girolamo Pamphili	Priest	Clement VIII	Italian	
Ferdinando Taverna	Priest	Clement VIII	Italian	
Anselmo Marzato	Priest	Clement VIII	Italian	
Erminio Valenti	Priest	Clement VIII	Italian	
Francesco Sforza	Deacon	Gregory XIII	Italian	
Alessandro Peretti di Montalto	Deacon	Sixtus V	Italian	
Odoardo Farnese	Deacon	Gregory XIV	Italian	
Cinzio Passeri Aldobrandini	Deacon	Clement VIII	Italian	
Bartolomeo Cesi	Deacon	Clement VIII	Italian	
Andrea Baroni Peretti Montalto	Deacon	Clement VIII	Italian	
Alessandro d'Este	Deacon	Clement VIII	Italian	
Giovanni Battista Deti	Deacon	Clement VIII	Italian	
Silvestro Aldobrandini	Deacon	Clement VIII	Italian	
Giovanni Andrea Doria	Deacon	Clement VIII	Italian	
Carlo Emanuele Pio di Savoia	Deacon	Clement VIII	Italian	
