= 1605 papal conclave =

1605 papal conclave may refer to:

- March–April 1605 papal conclave, which elected Leo XI to succeed Clement VIII
- May 1605 papal conclave, which elected Paul V to succeed Leo XI
