= Flaminio Piatti =

Italian cardinal (1552–1613)

Engraving portrait of cardinal Flaminio Piatti.

Flaminio Piatti (Turbigo, July 11, 1552 – Rome, November 1, 1613) was an Italian cardinal.

== Biography ==
Coming from a noble Milanese family that had already produced other figures in the Church, he was the son of Girolamo Piatti and Antonia Vicemale. He studied law, becoming a consistorial advocate in 1583 and an auditor of the Sacred Rota in 1586.

Pope Gregory XIV, to whom he was related, named him a cardinal-deacon during the consistory of March 6, 1591, assigning him the titular church of Santa Maria in Domnica. He received the red biretta on April 5 of the same year. Along with twelve other cardinals, he was tasked with overseeing the affairs of the Duchy of Ferrara. He participated in the 1591 conclave, which led to the election of Pope Innocent IX. He also took part in the 1592 conclave, which elected Pope Clement VIII.

During this pontificate, on March 9, 1592, he chose the deaconry of Santi Cosma e Damiano. The following year, on March 15, 1593, he moved to the title of Cardinal-Priest of San Clemente. Subsequently, on June 10, 1596, he opted for the title of Sant'Onofrio. On April 24, 1600, he changed his title once more, assuming that of Santa Maria della Pace. In 1604, together with other cardinals from Milan, he advocated for the beatification of Carlo Borromeo, who was canonized by Pope Paul V in 1610.

He participated in the first conclave of 1605, in which Pope Leo XI was elected, and in the second conclave of 1605, which saw the election of Pope Paul V. He served as Camerlengo of the Sacred College from January 1610 to January 1611.
He died on November 1, 1613, in Rome and was buried in the Church of the Gesù.
