= Paolo Emilio Sfondrati =

Italian cardinal (1560–1618)

- Cardinal-Bishop of Albano
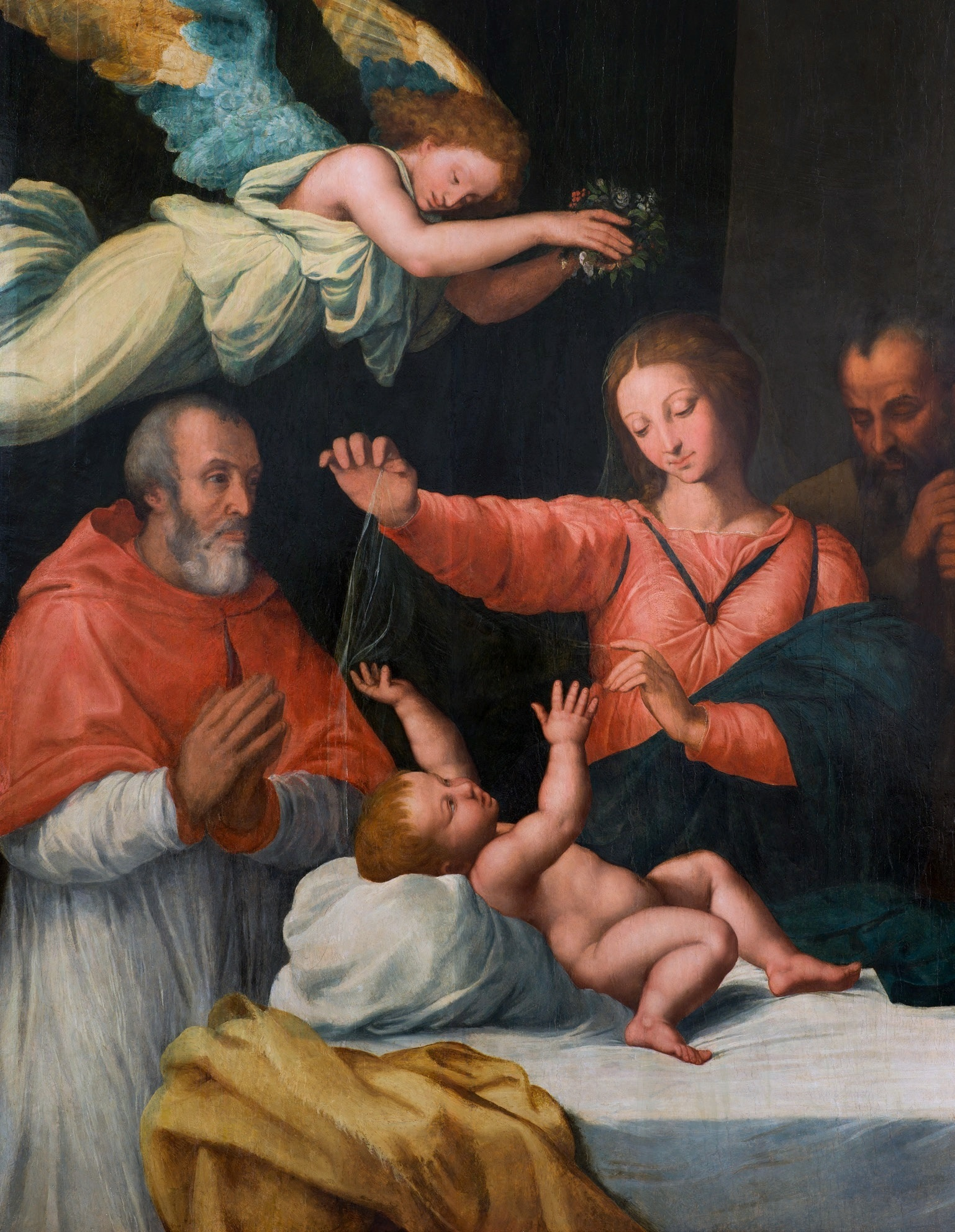
- Madonna del Velo with Cardinal Paolo Emilio Sfondrati, c. 1591, by Guido Reni (Wilanów Palace, Warsaw). The cardinal is shown kneeling at the right, his features rendered with careful realism.
- Church: Catholic Church
- See: Albano
- In office: 17 August 1611 – 14 February 1618
- Predecessor: Antonmaria Sauli
- Successor: Francesco Sforza
- Other post: Cardinal-Priest of Santa Cecilia (1591-1618)
- Previous post: Bishop of Cremona (1607-1610)

Orders
- Consecration: 16 September 1607 by Alfonso Visconti
- Created cardinal: 19 December 1590

Personal details
- Born: 21 March 1560 Milan, Duchy of Milan
- Died: 14 February 1618 (aged 57) Tivoli, Papal States

Paolo Emilio Sfondrati (21 March 1560 – 14 February 1618) was an Italian cardinal of the Catholic Church who served as a trusted papal advisor, diplomat, bishop, and patron of the arts during the height of the Counter-Reformation. The nephew of Pope Gregory XIV, he rose swiftly through the ecclesiastical ranks, holding a series of influential posts including Cardinal-Priest of Santa Cecilia in Trastevere, papal legate in Bologna, member of the Congregation of the Holy Office, and Cardinal-Bishop of Albano. His name is most enduringly associated with the rediscovery in 1599 of what were believed to be the relics of Saint Cecilia, an event that inspired a flourishing of devotional art and cemented his reputation as one of the most pious and generous churchmen of his generation. A close friend of Saint Philip Neri and a patron of Guido Reni and Stefano Maderno, Sfondrati embodied the union of aristocratic power, zealous reform, and artistic sensibility that characterised the Roman Curia at the turn of the seventeenth century.

== Family origins and the Sfondrati dynasty ==
The Sfondrati family traced its origins to the town of Cremona in Lombardy, where they had belonged to the local patriciate since the late Middle Ages. They rose to prominence through a combination of banking, landholding, and service to the Duchy of Milan. By the early sixteenth century they had established themselves among the leading noble houses of the region.

The decisive turn in the family's fortunes came with the election of Niccolò Sfondrati as Pope Gregory XIV in 1590. Niccolò was born in Somma Lombardo in 1535 and had been a reforming bishop, a close collaborator of Charles Borromeo, and a trusted cardinal under several popes. His pontificate lasted only ten months, from December 1590 to October 1591, but in that short span he elevated his nephew Paolo Emilio to the cardinalate and set the young prelate on a path that would make him one of the most visible figures in the Roman ecclesiastical establishment for nearly three decades.

Paolo Emilio's father, Giovanni Battista Sfondrati, was the pope's brother. His mother, Margherita Visconti, was a daughter of the Milanese aristocracy, linking the Sfondrati to one of the most storied lineages in northern Italy. The family's coat of arms, which featured a rampant lion and a bend of gold, could be found carved on the portals of churches, palaces, and villas throughout Lombardy and the Papal States by the end of the sixteenth century.

== Birth, childhood, and education ==
Paolo Emilio Sfondrati was born in Milan on 21 March 1560. His early childhood was shaped by the severe but deeply Catholic atmosphere of post-Tridentine Milan, where his father and uncles moved in circles influenced by the reform initiatives of Charles Borromeo. Very little is known about his earliest schooling, but it is likely that he received a humanist education typical of young noblemen destined for the Church. This would have included Latin grammar, rhetoric, philosophy, and some theology, probably under the tutelage of Jesuit fathers or diocesan clergy trained in the spirit of the Council of Trent.

The young Paolo Emilio was said to have been quiet and devout, more drawn to prayer and study than to the military exercises that occupied many of his peers. His uncle Niccolò, then Bishop of Cremona and later Cardinal, took a particular interest in him, seeing in the boy a potential instrument for the family's ecclesiastical ambitions. In 1585, when Niccolò was raised to the cardinalate by Pope Gregory XIII, Paolo Emilio accompanied him to Rome, entering the household as a conclavist and secretary. This move placed him at the centre of papal politics and gave him an intimate knowledge of the workings of the Curia.

== The pontificate of Gregory XIV and the creation of a cardinal-nephew ==
The death of Pope Urban VII in September 1590, after a reign of only twelve days, threw the Church into one of its periodic succession crises. The conclave that followed in December 1590 was deeply divided between Spanish and French factions, and the election of Cardinal Niccolò Sfondrati as Gregory XIV on 5 December 1590 was a compromise. The new pope, who was already in poor health, immediately appointed his nephew Paolo Emilio to the cardinalate, creating him cardinal deacon of San Giorgio in Velabro on 19 December 1590. The young man was thirty years old.

The appointment was a classic example of the practice of the cardinal-nephew, a system that allowed popes to place trusted relatives in key positions of power. Paolo Emilio was soon promoted to cardinal priest of Santa Cecilia in Trastevere on 13 November 1591, a title he would hold for the rest of his life. During his uncle's brief pontificate, he served as Cardinal Secretary of State in all but name, overseeing diplomatic correspondence, managing relations with the Catholic powers, and directing the papal household. When Gregory XIV died in October 1591, the Sfondrati faction lost its immediate source of power, but Paolo Emilio had already established himself as a capable administrator and a figure of considerable personal influence.

== Life in the Curia under Clement VIII and Paul V ==
After his uncle's death, Sfondrati navigated the shifting currents of Roman politics with skill. He aligned himself with the reformist circles around Pope Clement VIII (1592–1605), whose pontificate was marked by a rigorous enforcement of Tridentine discipline. In 1593 he was appointed a member of the Congregation of the Holy Office, the supreme tribunal of the Inquisition. In this capacity he participated in the examination of doctrinal cases and the censorship of books. He was also involved in the early stages of the proceedings against Giordano Bruno, though Bruno's trial and execution in 1600 were handled by a narrower committee of cardinals led by Robert Bellarmine.

Sfondrati served as papal legate in Bologna during the mid-1590s, a position that required him to administer one of the most important cities of the Papal States and to mediate between the local nobility and the central government in Rome. His tenure was considered successful; he improved the city's fiscal administration and strengthened the authority of the ecclesiastical courts. Returning to Rome, he was appointed to the Congregation of the Council, which interpreted and applied the decrees of the Council of Trent, and to the Congregation of Bishops and Regulars, which supervised the reform of religious orders.

Under Pope Paul V (1605–1621), Sfondrati continued to hold important curial posts. He was a trusted advisor on diplomatic matters, particularly concerning relations with the Spanish monarchy and the Holy Roman Empire. His correspondence, preserved in the Vatican archives and in the family papers in Cremona, reveals a man of methodical habits, cautious judgment, and deep loyalty to the Holy See.

== The rediscovery of the relics of Saint Cecilia (1599) ==
The event that assured Sfondrati's lasting fame occurred in the autumn of 1599, during the restoration of the basilica of Santa Cecilia in Trastevere, his titular church. The church, one of the oldest in Rome, was believed to have been built on the site of the house of the Roman martyr Saint Cecilia, who was executed around the year 230 under the Emperor Alexander Severus. Her body, according to the Passio Sanctae Caeciliae, had been buried in the Catacombs of Callixtus and later translated to the basilica by Pope Paschal I in the ninth century, but the exact location had been lost.

On 20 October 1599, workers digging beneath the main altar uncovered a marble sarcophagus. When the lid was raised, the body of a young woman was revealed, wrapped in a white robe stained with blood, lying on her right side. Her head, turned toward the ground, appeared to be partly severed, and her fingers were extended, three on the right hand and one on the left, a gesture that tradition interpreted as a silent profession of faith in the Holy Trinity and the oneness of God.

Sfondrati was summoned immediately. He knelt before the sarcophagus and, according to contemporary reports, wept openly. The news spread rapidly through Rome. Pope Clement VIII sent a commission of cardinals and physicians to examine the body. They pronounced it to be in a state of miraculous preservation and confirmed the identification as Saint Cecilia. On 22 November 1599, the pope himself visited the basilica to venerate the relics.

Sfondrati commissioned the young sculptor Stefano Maderno to create a life-size marble statue of the saint as she had been found. Maderno's work, completed in 1600, is a masterpiece of early Baroque naturalism. The figure lies on its side, the head turned away, the body twisted in the exact posture described by the witnesses. The folds of the robe, the delicate rendering of the hands, and the suggestion of the severed neck are executed with a restraint that heightens the emotional impact. An inscription on the plinth records that Maderno sculpted the saint "just as he saw her incorrupt body lying in the tomb". The statue stands before the high altar of the basilica and remains one of the most visited and admired sculptures in Rome.

The cardinal also paid for a new canopy over the altar, the restoration of the crypt, and the production of reliquaries to distribute fragments of the saint's clothing and bones to churches across Europe. He ordered the creation of a detailed written account of the discovery, which was published in Rome and circulated widely, and he commissioned paintings and engravings that depicted the scene. The rediscovery of Saint Cecilia's relics became a signal event of the Counter-Reformation, confirming the authenticity of the early Christian martyrs and demonstrating the vitality of the Roman Church at a time when Protestant critics ridiculed the cult of saints and relics.

== Artistic patronage ==
Sfondrati's artistic patronage extended well beyond Maderno. Around 1591 he had already hired the young Bolognese painter Guido Reni, then at the very beginning of his Roman career, to produce an altarpiece for Santa Cecilia. The resulting painting, the Madonna del Velo (also called Madonna of the Veil), shows the Virgin Mary seated with the Christ Child on her lap. Saint Cecilia kneels before them, and the infant Jesus lifts a transparent veil from her face. Sfondrati himself is portrayed kneeling at the right, dressed in his cardinal's robes, his hands clasped in prayer, his face turned toward the sacred scene with an expression of serene devotion. The painting blends the formal elegance of late Mannerism with the emotional warmth of the emerging Baroque style. It now hangs in the Wilanów Palace in Warsaw, having been acquired by Polish collectors in the eighteenth century.

Sfondrati also supported the work of other artists. He commissioned frescoes for the family chapel in Sant'Agostino and for the palace he maintained near the Quirinal Hill. He collected ancient sculpture and contemporary paintings, forming one of the notable ecclesiastical collections of the early Seicento. His household was a gathering place for poets, musicians, and scholars, and he was a generous benefactor to the Congregation of the Oratory, the community founded by his friend Saint Philip Neri.

== Friendship with Saint Philip Neri ==
Sfondrati's friendship with Philip Neri was one of the most significant relationships of his life. Neri, the founder of the Oratory, was a charismatic priest known for his joyful spirituality, his gift for conversation, and his profound influence on the religious life of Rome. He attracted a wide circle of followers that included cardinals, nobles, and commoners alike. Sfondrati was drawn into this circle in the 1580s and remained close to Neri until the saint's death in 1595.

The cardinal adopted many of Neri's devotional practices, including frequent confession, mental prayer, and visits to the Seven Pilgrim Churches of Rome. He attended Neri's informal gatherings at San Girolamo della Carità, where the Oratory was first established, and he later supported the construction of the Chiesa Nuova, the Oratory's permanent home. When Neri died, Sfondrati was among the prelates who pressed for his canonisation, which was eventually proclaimed in 1622. The influence of Oratorian spirituality can be seen in Sfondrati's own approach to piety, which combined rigorous orthodoxy with a gentle, humane warmth.

== Episcopal ministry in Cremona and Albano ==
Although Sfondrati had been a cardinal for seventeen years, he did not receive episcopal consecration until 16 September 1607, when he was ordained bishop by Cardinal Alfonso Visconti. The delay was not unusual; many cardinal priests in this period remained laymen or in minor orders for years, especially those whose duties kept them in the Curia.

In the same year he was appointed Bishop of Cremona, a diocese with deep family ties. He governed the see for three years, undertaking a programme of reform that included regular pastoral visitations, the enforcement of clerical discipline, and the establishment of a diocesan seminary in line with the decrees of Trent. He also beautified the cathedral and encouraged devotion to local saints.

In 1610 he resigned the diocese in favour of his coadjutor, Giambattista Brivio, and the following year was promoted to the suburbicarian see of Albano, one of the seven ancient bishoprics surrounding Rome held by senior cardinals. In Albano he devoted himself to the pastoral care of his flock, rebuilding the episcopal palace and endowing charities for the poor. He continued to attend curial meetings and to advise the pope on matters of state, dividing his time between the Roman palace, the villa at Tivoli, and the quiet episcopal residence in the hills.

== Character and personal life ==
Contemporary descriptions of Sfondrati emphasise his piety, his generosity, and his gentle manner. The Venetian ambassador described him as "a man of good intentions, but not of strong spirit", a judgment that suggests a temperament more suited to prayer and patronage than to the cut and thrust of papal politics. Others noted his habit of rising early to pray, his abstemious diet, and his reluctance to engage in the factional intrigues that consumed many of his colleagues.

He lived modestly for a prince of the Church, channelling much of his income into churches, convents, and charitable foundations. His household accounts, preserved in the family archives, record regular disbursements to the poor, to orphanages, and to religious communities. He owned a large library that included works of theology, history, and classical literature, and he corresponded with scholars across Italy.

Despite his ecclesiastical rank, he seems to have been happiest in the company of his sister Paola Antonia, who was prioress of the Angelic Sisters of Saint Paul, and of his close friends among the Oratorians. He never married, and there is no evidence of the worldly attachments that sometimes marked the lives of cardinal-nephews.

== Death, burial, and legacy ==
In the winter of 1618, Sfondrati's health began to fail. He withdrew to Tivoli, a town in the hills east of Rome, hoping that the clear air would restore him. It did not. He died there on 14 February 1618, at the age of fifty-seven. His body was brought back to Rome and interred in the basilica of Santa Cecilia in Trastevere, before the altar of the saint he had helped to exalt.

A funerary monument, modest in scale but elegant in design, was erected in the basilica. It bears an inscription recording his titles and his role in the discovery of the relics, and it invites passers-by to pray for his soul.

Sfondrati's legacy is multiple. As a cardinal-nephew, he exemplifies the system by which papal families consolidated power and shaped the Church's direction in the early modern period. As a reformer, he contributed to the implementation of the Council of Trent's decrees, particularly in the fields of episcopal governance and clerical education. As a patron, he left behind some of the most poignant works of early Roman Baroque art, including Maderno's Saint Cecilia and Reni's Madonna del Velo. And as a man of faith, he lived a life that those who knew him regarded as genuinely holy, if not quite heroic enough for canonisation.

Historians have sometimes treated him as a secondary figure, overshadowed by more dynamic contemporaries such as Cesare Baronio, Robert Bellarmine, and Scipione Borghese. Yet the rediscovery of Saint Cecilia's body and its artistic commemoration remain among the defining moments of Counter-Reformation piety, and it is through these that Sfondrati's name endures. In the basilica of Santa Cecilia, the statue by Maderno continues to move visitors, and the cardinal who knelt before the open sarcophagus in October 1599 has not been forgotten.

== Episcopal succession ==
Episcopal succession of Paolo Emilio Sfondrati

While bishop, he was the principal consecrator of:

- Juan Torres de Osorio, Bishop of Siracusa (1613);
- Juan Serrano Ortiz, Bishop of Acerno (1613);
- Clemente Gera, Bishop of Terni (1613);
- Crisostomo Antichi, Bishop of Trebinje e Mrkan (1615); and
- Vincenzo Lanteri, Archbishop of Dubrovnik (1616).

== Notes ==
Catholic Church titles
Preceded by Niccolò Sfondrati	Cardinal-Priest of Santa Cecilia in Trastevere; 1591–1611	Succeeded by Giambattista Leni
Preceded by Cesare Speciano	Bishop of Cremona; 1607–1618	Succeeded by Giambattista Brivio
Preceded by Antonmaria Sauli	Cardinal-Bishop of Albano; 1611–1618	Succeeded by Francesco Sforza
