= May 1605 conclave =

Election of Catholic Pope Paul V

Papal conclave May 1605

Dates and location
- 8–16 May 1605; Apostolic Palace, Papal States
- Electors: 58 (list)

Elected pope
- Camillo Borghese; Name taken: Paul V
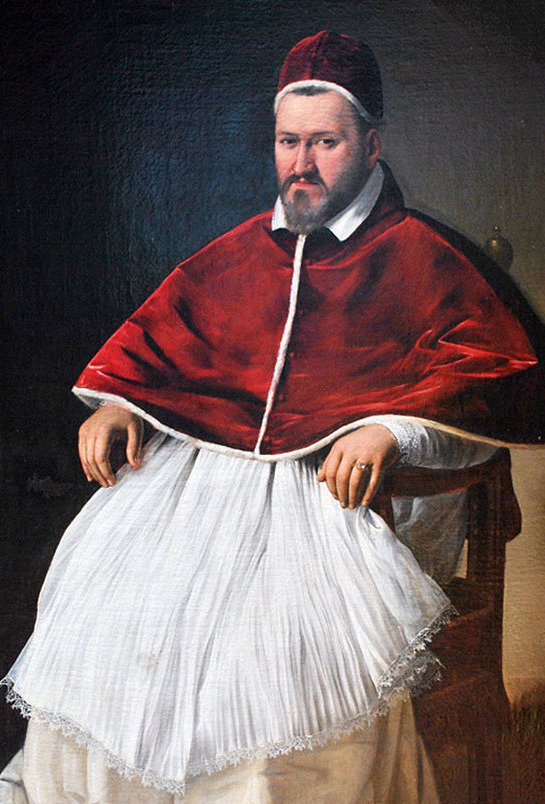

The May 1605 conclave held from 8 to 16 May 1605; Cardinal Camillo Borghese was elected to succeed Leo XI as pope. Borghese took the name Paul V. This was the second conclave of 1605, with the one that had elected Leo XI having concluded just 37 days earlier. It had the only recorded case of an injury at a conclave, which was the result of a physical fight amongst the cardinals over who should be elected pope.

== Background ==
Pope Clement VIII died in March 1605. The 60 cardinal electors who met in the conclave to elect his successor were split among various factions roughly equally divided between loyalty to France and to Spain. In addition to the secular politics that influenced these papal elections, during this period they were marked by a strategy among elite families to acquire prestige and power. These strategies often played out over several generations through patronage and the accumulation of wealth, and bestowing favours on family members once an individual's election to the papacy was expected.

Sources from the time of the March 1605 conclave listed up to twenty-one possible candidates considered by the cardinals, but the only ones that were seriously discussed during the conclave were Cesare Baronius and Alessandro Ottaviano de' Medici. That conclave saw Spain veto Cesare Baronius after the first ballot. Medici, the candidate who was finally elected, was also vetoed by the cardinal representing Spain but this occurred after the election of Leo XI, and the cardinals did not view the veto as valid. The March conclave had seen the rival Aldobrandini and Montalto factions unable to elect a member of either of their families to the papacy; both eventually agreed to elect Leo, a member of the cadet branch of the Medici.

Leo was 70 at the time of his election and, though in good health previously, fell ill on the day of his coronation. He died on 27 April 1605, 26 days after his election to the papacy. During his illness, Leo had been encouraged to appoint a cardinal nephew, but declined to do so.

== Conclave ==
In addition to Leo, another cardinal had died, reducing the number of cardinal electors in the May conclave to 59. At the beginning of the conclave, Alessandro Peretti di Montalto supported Antonio Sauli. A significant number of the electors loyal to Pietro Aldobrandini, the nephew of Pope Clement VIII, were willing to support Sauli. Aldobrandini, however, opposed Sauli's election due to Sauli's previous opposition to electing Clement, and was able to prevent Sauli from reaching the two-thirds majority required for election.

Aldobrandini moved to support Robert Bellarmine for the papacy, but Bellarmine said he would "not lift a straw" to advance his own election. Anselmo Marzato opposed Bellarmine, and was able to undermine his candidacy because he had taken a very public position on the De Auxilliis controversy. Bellarmine was eventually vetoed by Spain, which put an end to his candidacy. Aldobrandini also moved for the election of Domenico Toschi, going so far as to get 38 electors to bring him to the Pauline Chapel to be acclaimed pope. Caesar Baronius, however, was opposed to Toschi's election and spoke against it, causing his friends to urge for Baronius's election as pope. Thomas Hobbes later reported that Baronius's opposition to Toschi was based on Toschi's frequent usage of the word cazzo, Lombard slang for penis, and that he urged the cardinals not to elect Toschi because of this. This led to a physical altercation between the two sides that could be heard on the streets outside the conclave. The fight resulted in the only known instance of serious injury being suffered in a conclave: Alfonso Visconti had several bones broken.

== Election of Paul V ==
Following the disruption, a vote was taken and it became clear that Toschi lacked the support needed for election by two votes. The leaders of the competing factions met to select a compromise candidate and Camillo Borghese was unanimously elected pope the same day. Borghese had been among the papabili at the conclave that had elected Leo XI, but was considered too young at the time to become pope. At the May conclave, it became clear to the electors that he would be the only candidate acceptable to all the factions, and he was elected as a compromise candidate, taking the name Paul V.

As a cardinal, Paul had previously maintained neutrality between the great powers of Spain and France that had dominated the previous conclave and were present in the current one as well. While he had been the papal envoy to Spain and was receiving a pension from them, he was largely low profile as a cardinal and perceived as neutral. At 54, Paul was relatively young at the time of his election, and was anticipated to have a lengthy papacy, not requiring a third conclave soon. He lived until 1621, reigning nearly 16 years.

== See also ==
- Cardinal electors for the May 1605 conclave
