= James Chater =

British composer

James Chater is a British composer and musicologist born in Henley-on-Thames in 1951. He studied music at the University of Oxford, taking the BA in 1973 and the D.Phil. in 1980. His thesis, Luca Marenzio and the Italian Madrigal, 1577–1593, was published as a book (Ann Arbor: UMI Research Press) in 1981. He is the author of many articles on secular music in Italy in the late 16th century; these have appeared in Early Music, the Journal of American Musicology, Journal of Musicology, Music & Letters, The Musical Times, Notes, the Rivista italiana di musicologia, Il saggiatore musicale, Studi musicali and other periodicals and Festschrifts. In his writings several previously anonymous madrigal texts are identified, and the intimate ties between poets, musicians and patrons are explored. Chater was a Fellow of the Harvard Center for Italian Renaissance Studies (Villa I Tatti, Florence) from 1981–82.

From 1982 to 1986 James Chater taught history of music at the University of Wales (Aberystwyth), Washington University in St. Louis (USA), the University of Victoria (BC, Canada) and the University of British Columbia (Vancouver, Canada). From 1986 to 1997 he was English-language Editor of classical music CD booklets for Philips Classics Records (Baarn, The Netherlands), and has been pursuing a career in publishing ever since then.

== Compositions ==
From the 1990s James Chater has also been active as a composer. The focus of his activities in this field has been the composing and arranging of choral works for liturgical use within the Orthodox Church, of which he has been a member since 1995. Most of his liturgical works are written to texts in the English, Dutch and French languages, with a few other compositions in Church Slavonic. Since 2008 he has been living in France, and in 2024 he founded a vocal chamber group, the Ensemble Chrysostome, specializing in recently composed liturgical works for the Orthodox Church. Its premiere took place in the Joan of Arc Church (parish of St John the Theologian), Meudon, France, on 30 June 2024 . In a number of articles and conference papers (which have appeared in In Communion, The Messenger, the 2005 and 2007 Proceedings of the International Society for Orthodox Church Music (ISOCM) and Sourozh) he has addressed issues of liturgical music in the Orthodox parishes of countries that are not traditionally Orthodox. These topics include translation, the relationship between text and music, and striking the right balance between conservation and creativity. His works have been performed in Finland, Russia and Serbia.

== Recordings ==
In 2008 a recording of his Great Prokeimenon for Forgiveness Sunday, sung by the Orthodox Choir of Joensuu University directed by Petri Nykänen, was issued on as part of the CD anthology "Oi Kuningas ja Herra" ("O King and Lord").
