= Giovanni Battista Deti =

Italian cardinal and bishop

His Eminence Giovanni Battista Deti
- Cardinal-Bishop of Ostia e Velletri; Bishop of Reggio Emilia
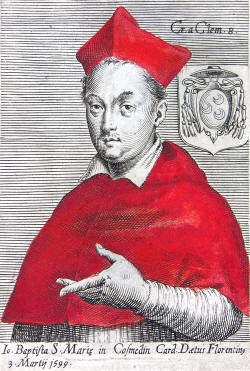
- Church: Catholic Church

Orders
- Consecration: 24 Jun 1623 by Ottavio Bandini

Personal details
- Born: 16 Feb 1580 Ferrara, Italy
- Died: 13 Jul 1630 (age 50) Rome, Italy
- Coat of arms

Giovanni Battista Deti (1580–1630) was a Roman Catholic cardinal.

== Biography ==
On 24 Jun 1623, he was consecrated bishop by Ottavio Bandini, Cardinal-Bishop of Palestrina, with Alfonso Gonzaga, Titular Archbishop of Rhodus, and Federico Baldissera Bartolomeo Cornaro, Bishop of Bergamo, serving as co-consecrators.

Catholic Church titles
Preceded by Francesco Mantica	Cardinal-Deacon of Sant'Adriano al Foro; 1599	Succeeded by Alessandro d'Este
Preceded by Ascanio Colonna	Cardinal-Deacon of Santa Maria in Cosmedin; 1599–1614	Succeeded by Alessandro Orsini
Preceded by Orazio Maffei	Cardinal-Priest of Santi Marcellino e Pietro; 1614–1623	Succeeded by Girolamo Boncompagni
Preceded by Alessandro Damasceni Peretti	Cardinal-Bishop of Albano; 1623–1626	Succeeded by Andrea Baroni Peretti Montalto
Preceded by Odoardo Farnese	Cardinal-Bishop of Frascati; 1626	Succeeded by Bonifazio Bevilacqua Aldobrandini
Preceded by Ottavio Bandini	Cardinal-Bishop of Ostia e Velletri; 1626–1630	Succeeded by Domenico Ginnasi
