= Francesco Sforza (cardinal) =

Italian cardinal and bishop

His Eminence Francesco Sforza
- Marquess of Castell'Arquato; Cardinal-Bishop of Porto–Santa Rufina
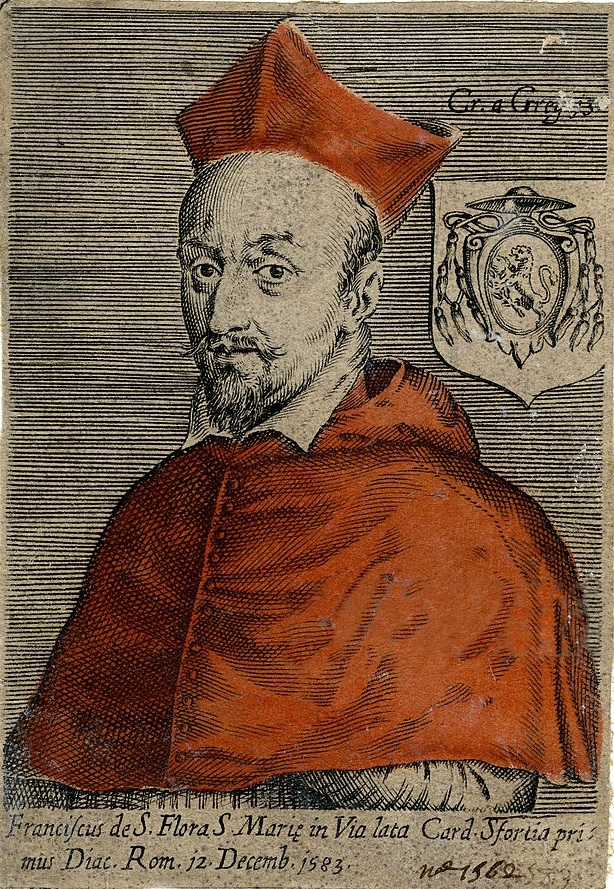
- Church: Catholic Church
- Appointed: 27 September 1623
- Term ended: 9 September 1624
- Predecessor: Francesco Maria del Monte
- Successor: Ottavio Bandini
- Previous posts: Cardinal-Deacon of San Giorgio in Velabro (1584–1585); Cardinal-Deacon of Santa Maria in Via Lata (1588–1617); Cardinal-Bishop of Albano (1618–1620)

Orders
- Ordination: 1614
- Consecration: 1 May 1618 by Pope Paul V
- Created cardinal: 12 December 1583 by Pope Gregory XIII
- Rank: Cardinal-Bishop

Personal details
- Born: Francesco Sforza di Santa Fiora; 6 November 1562 Parma, Duchy of Parma
- Died: 9 September 1624 (aged 61) Rome, Papal States
- Coat of arms

Francesco Sforza (Parma, 6 November 1562 – Rome, 5 February 1624) was an Italian cardinal and bishop. He was very influential in a number of conclaves.

== Biography ==
=== Background and early career in the military ===
Francesco was born in Parma on 6 November 1562, the son of Sforza Sforza of Santa Fiora, 1st Marquess of Castell'Arquato, 11th Count of Santa Fiora, and Caterina de' Nobili. He was the 2nd Marquess of Castell'Arquato, 1st Marquess of Varzi and 12th Count of Santa Fiora. Francesco received a military education under Ottavio Farnese, Duke of Parma and later at the court of Francesco I de' Medici, Grand Duke of Tuscany. He also studied Latin, rhetoric, mathematics, philosophy, and politics. At age 18, he served in Flanders under his cousin Alexander Farnese, Duke of Parma; he commanded Italian troops.

=== Early ecclesiastical career ===
Francesco was temporarily engaged to Virginia de Medici, a sister of Francesco I de' Medici, Grand Duke of Tuscany. His half-sister Costanza Sforza, duchess of Sora, who was married to Giacomo Boncompagni, the legitimized son of Pope Gregory XIII, encouraged him to pursue an ecclesiastical career. He became a cleric in Rome and rose quickly in the church, first becoming a canon of the cathedral chapter of San Nicola in Carcere before he had even been ordained as a priest.

=== Cardinalate ===
Pope Gregory XIII made him a cardinal deacon in the consistory of 12 December 1583. He received the red hat and the deaconry of San Giorgio in Velabro on 6 January 1584, but later exchanged it for Santa Maria in Via Lata. He participated in the papal conclave of 1585 that elected Pope Sixtus V; and in the first papal conclave of 1590 that elected Pope Urban VII. Contemporary newspapers reported that a disagreement between Cardinals Ascanio Colonna and Sforza di Santa Fiora during the conclave nearly became violent.

In the second papal conclave of 1590 he was a member of the Gregorian faction and threw his support to Niccolò Sfondrati, who was elected Pope Gregory XIV. He also participated in the papal conclave of 1591 that elected Pope Innocent IX. In the papal conclave of 1592, Sforza opposed Philip II of Spain's candidate, Giulio Antonio Santorio. Sforza'a brother-in-law and French ally, Ferdinando I de' Medici, Grand Duke of Tuscany secretly engineered the election of Ippolito Aldobrandini as Pope Clement VIII.

From 20 July 1591 until 1597 he was papal legate in Romagna, where he was charged with ridding the province of bandits, which he accomplished. He represented Pope Clement VIII at the baptism of his nephew Cosimo II de' Medici, Grand Duke of Tuscany. He accompanied the pope to Ferrara in 1598. He participated in the first papal conclave of 1605, where he had been angered by Spain's exclusion of Caesar Baronius. The conclave chose Alessandro Ottaviano de' Medici, who had also been excluded after the fact, as Pope Leo XI. He was also present at the second papal conclave of 1605 that elected Pope Paul V. Sforza crowned Pope Paul V in the papal coronation held on 29 May 1605.

He was ordained as a priest in 1614. On 13 November 1617 he opted for the order of cardinal priests and received the titular church of San Matteo in Via Merulana. He became the protopriest of the College of Cardinals.

He opted for the order of cardinal bishop on 5 March 1618, receiving the Suburbicarian Diocese of Albano. He was consecrated as a bishop by Pope Paul V in the apostolic chapel of the Quirinal Palace on 1 May 1618. He opted for the Suburbicarian Diocese of Frascati on 6 April 1620.

He participated in the papal conclave of 1621 that elected Pope Gregory XV and in the papal conclave of 1623 that elected Pope Urban VIII.

On 27 September 1623 he opted for the Suburbicarian Diocese of Porto-Santa Rufina. He was Vice-Dean of the College of Cardinals.

He died in Rome on 9 September 1624. He was buried in San Bernardo alle Terme, the church built by his mother.

=== Issue ===
By an unknown mistress he had:

- Caterina Sforza (1587 - 1609), legitimized by Pope Paul V on 5 July 1599, married firstly on 19 November 1601 Fabrizio Savelli of the Lords of Ariccia (? - 16 September 1605), 1st Prince of Albano, she married secondly on 2 August 1606 Federico I de' Rossi (18 May 1580 - 22 March 1632), 5th Marquess of San Secondo, without issue

By Cecilia Pariseni-Mezangola he had:

- Sforzino Sforza (1593 - Castell'Arquato, 5 February 1644), legitimized by Pope Paul V on 5 July 1599, 2nd Marquess of Varzi in 1604, 1st Duke of Fiano in 1607 with Papal Bull of Pope Paul V until 1621, 3rd Marquess of Castell'Arquato in 1624, married in 1606 Maria di Rodolfo Pio di Carpi, already Lady of Meldola, separated, without issue

== Sources ==
- Fosi, Irene; Visceglia, Maria Antonietta (2002). "Marriage and Politics at the papal court in the sixteenth and seventeenth centuries". In Lowe, K. J. P.; Dean, Trevor (eds.). Marriage in Italy, 1300-1650. Cambridge University Press. pp. 197–226. ISBN 9780521893763.
- Le Thiec, Guy (2012). "Portraits d'un conquerant. Selim I au miroir de la culture artistique italienne de la Renaissance (1517-1575)". In Lellouch, Benjamin; Michel, Nicolas (eds.). Conquête Ottomane de L'Égypte (1517): Arrière-plan, Impact, Échos (in Italian). Brill. pp. 339–380. ISBN 9789004232082.
- Schleuse, Paul (2015). Singing Games in Early Modern Italy: The Music Books of Orazio Vecchi. Indiana University Press. ISBN 9780253015044.
- Williams, George L. (2024). Papal Genealogy: The Families and Descendants of the Popes. McFarland, Inc. ISBN 9781476632278.201
