= Giacomo Sannesio =

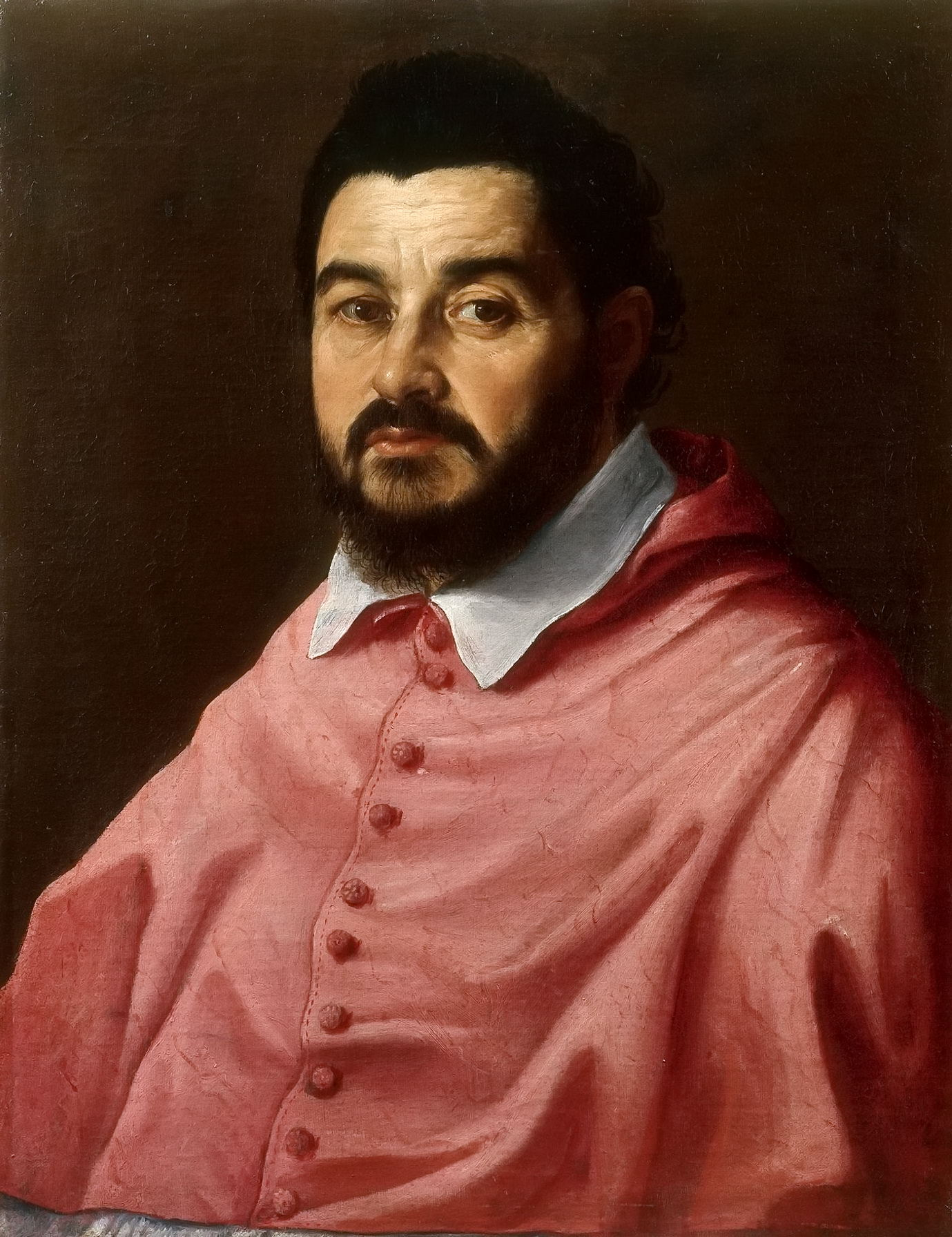
1609 portrait of Cardinal Giacomo Sannesio by Guido Reni.

Giacomo Sannesio (c. 1557/1560 – 19 February 1621) was an Italian Catholic cardinal, prominent art collector and patron of early 17th-century artists.

== Early life ==
Sanessio was born in Belforte del Chienti to a "very humble" family.

He studied law and then, assisted by his brother, he went to Rome and entered the service of Cardinal Pietro Aldobrandini. He was appointed to a number of administrative church positions.

== Cardinalate ==
In 1604 Sannesio was elevated to cardinal by Pope Clement VIII and was appointed cardinal-priest of Santo Stefano Rotondo. He was elected Bishop of Orvieto in 1605. He was appointed Camerlengo of the Sacred College of Cardinals in 1620 but died early the following year on 19 February 1621 and was buried at the church of San Silvestro al Quirinale

== Art patronage and collection ==
As cardinal, Sannesio became a renowned art collector and patron.

He became an early supporter of Caravaggio. The artist submitted a number of works as part of a commission from the church of Santa Maria del Popolo. But when some early works were rejected, Sannesio provided financial support by buying the paintings himself. Caravaggio's paintings, the Crucifixion of St. Peter and the Conversion on the Way to Damascus were eventually accepted by the church. Other historians have queried this version of events, suggesting that Sannesio's purchases were, more simply, retouched copies, though still created by Caravaggio. In any event, the versions were of such a quality that some scholars even queried their authorship. Only one, Sannesio's version of the Conversion on the Way to Damascus, survives and is now in the Odescalchi collection.

Sannesio also bought a series of paintings from Orazio Gentileschi, some of which remained in the estates of his descendants for many generations.
