= Anselmo Marzato =

17th-century Catholic cardinal

His Eminence Anselmo Marzato
- Cardinal-Priest of San Pietro in Montorio; Archbishop of Chieti
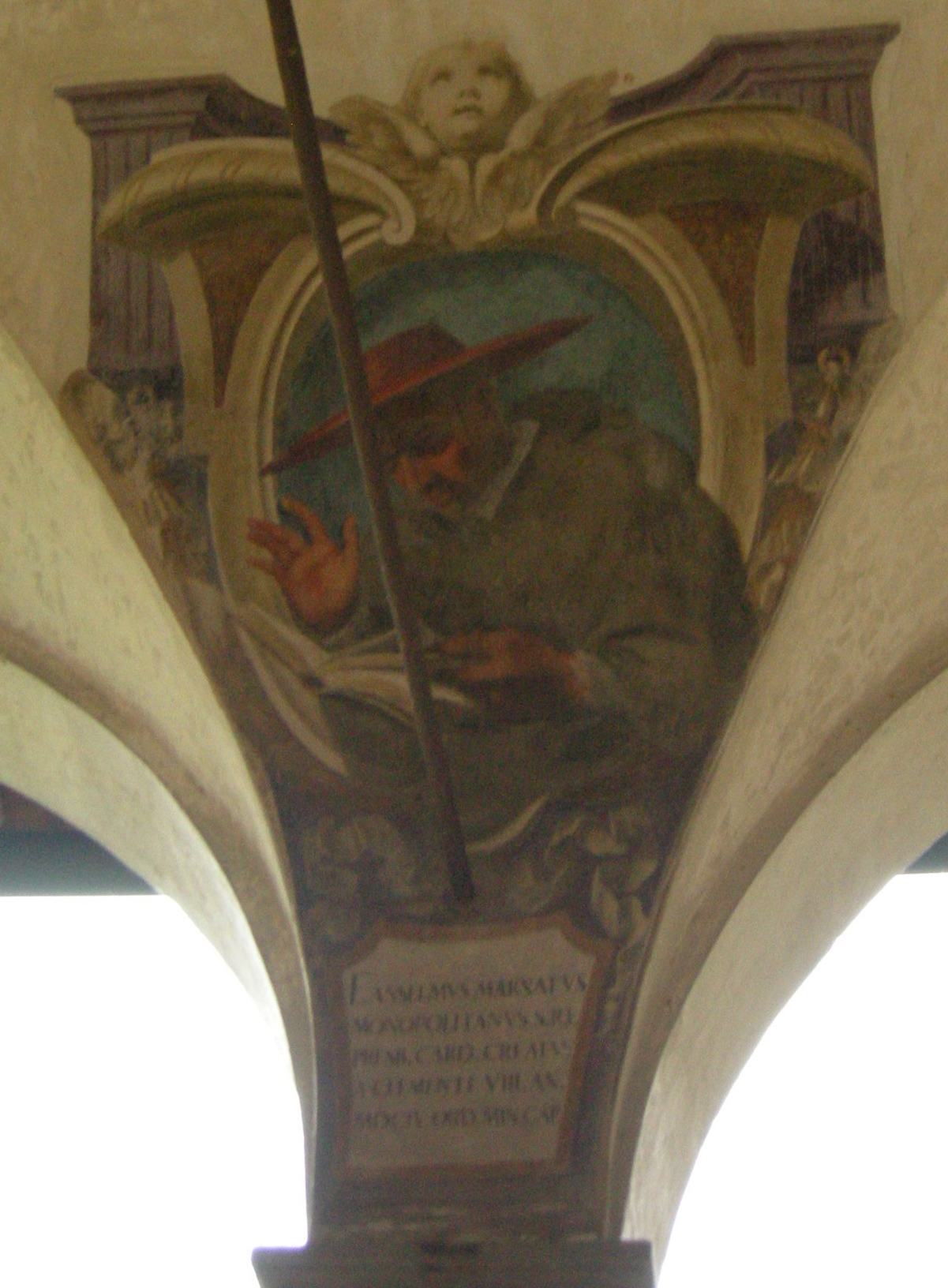
- Church: Catholic Church

Orders
- Consecration: 24 Feb 1607 by Pope Paul V

Personal details
- Born: 6 Nov 1543 Monopoli, Italy
- Died: 17 Aug 1607 (age 63)

Anselmo Marzato, OFMCap (1543–1607) was a Roman Catholic cardinal.

On 24 Feb 1607, he was consecrated bishop Pope Paul V, with Ludovico de Torres, Archbishop of Monreale, with Marcello Lante della Rovere, Bishop of Todi, serving as co-consecrators.

Catholic Church titles
| Preceded by Domenico Toschi | Cardinal-Priest of San Pietro in Montorio; 1604–1607 | Succeeded by Maffeo Barberini |
| Preceded by Matteo Sanminiato | Archbishop of Chieti; 1607 | Succeeded by Orazio Maffei |
