= Domenico Toschi =

Italian cardinal

His Eminence Domenico Toschi
- Cardinal-Priest of San Pietro in Montorio
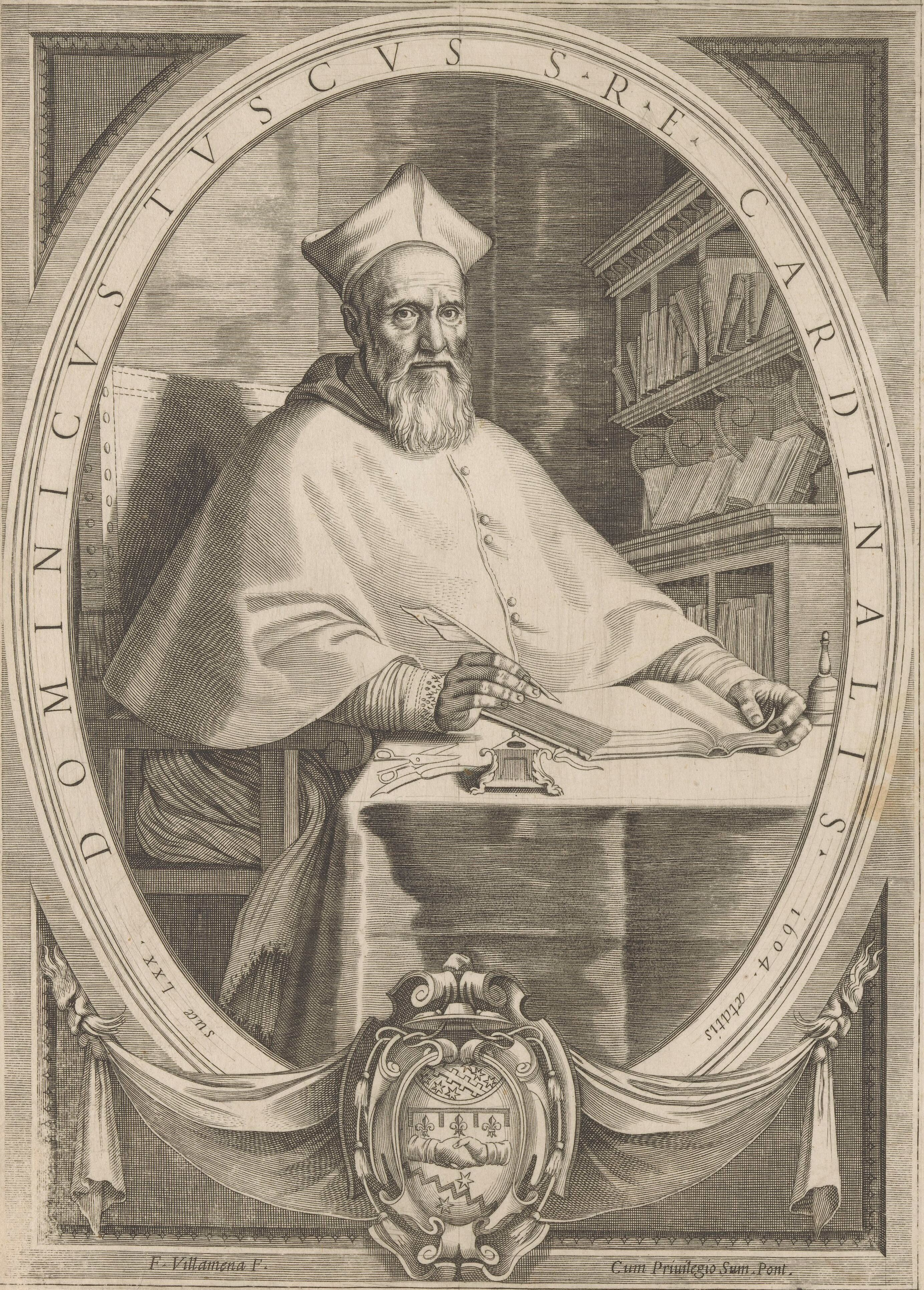

Orders
- Consecration: 21 May 1595 by Mariano Pierbenedetti
- Created cardinal: 3 March 1599 by Pope Clement VIII
- Rank: Cardinal-Priest

Personal details
- Born: 11 June 1535
- Died: 26 March 1620 (aged 84)
- Denomination: Catholic Church

Domenico Toschi (June 11, 1535 – March 26, 1620) was an Italian soldier, jurist, and cardinal of the Catholic Church.

He was born in Castellarano in Reggio Emilia to a poor family. After having originally served as a soldier, Toschi trained in Rome and became a noted canon lawyer. He wrote the multi-volume legal treatise Practicarum conclusionum iuris in omni foro frequentiorum. He served as Vice-Legate in Bologna and was its governor (1585–1588), and then as a councillor in Tuscany (1588–1592).

He was Bishop of Tivoli from 1595 to 1606. He wrote the manuscript "L'Antichità di Tivoli e della Villa d'Adriano Imperatore" He was created Cardinal-Priest of San Pietro in Montorio on 3 March 1599 by Pope Clement VIII as a reward for successfully governing Rome while Clement was in Ferrara.

He participated in the Papal conclaves of March and May 1605. Toschi was a candidate for the papacy in the May 1605 papal conclave, and was almost acclaimed pope, but Caesar Baronius intervened, objecting that Toschi was unfit for the papacy because his language and dress would cause scandal. Following Baronius' intervention, a scrutiny was taken, and Toschi fell short of election to the papacy by two votes.

He transferred his titular church to Sant'Onofrio in 1604, returning to San Pietro in Montorio in 1610. He resigned as Bishop of Tivoli in 1606, and was replaced by his nephew, Giovanni Battista Toschi. He served as Camerlengo of the Sacred College of Cardinals in 1616–17. He published a number of works on canon law, and was known for fostering the education of indigent students, who like him, had wished to use their education to rise in position. He died in Rome.

== Works ==
- Practicae conclusiones juris (Rome, 1605–1608, 8 volumes in folio)
- Tractatus de jure statuum in imperio Romano (Frankfort, 1620 in quarto)
- Theologicarum quasetionum ac ractationum omnium series (Bologna, 1662 in quarto)

Records
Preceded by Pierre de Gondi	Oldest living Member of the Sacred College; 17 February 1616 – 26 March 1620	Succeeded by Ladislao d'Aquino
