= Anne d'Escars de Givry =

French Benedictine churchman

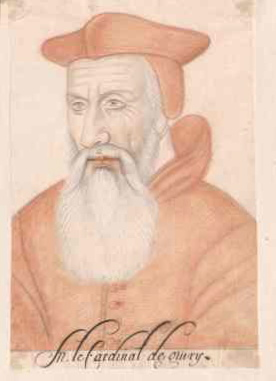
Anne de Perusse d'Escars, cardinal of Givry

Anne d'Escars de Givry (29 March 1546 – 19 April 1612) was a French Benedictine churchman, supporter of the Ligue, and cardinal.

== Biography ==
Anne was born in Paris, the son of Jacques de Pérusse, Seigneur d'Escars and Françoise de Longwy, Dame de Pagny and de Mirebeau.

He became bishop of Lisieux in 1584. He was created Cardinal in 1596, without the knowledge of Henry IV of France, and had to give up his see. He became bishop of Metz in 1608.

== Books ==
- Cardella, Lorenzo (1793). Memorie storiche de' cardinali della santa Romana chiesa (in Italian). Vol. Tomo sesto. Roma: Pagliarini. pp. 23–27.
- Formeville, H. de (1763). Histoire de l'ancien évêché-comté de Lisieux (in French). Vol. Tome second. Brionne (Eure): le Portulan. pp. 234–240.
- Mellinghoff-Bourgerie, Viviane (1999). François de Sales, 1567-1622: un homme de lettres spirituelles : culture, tradition, épistolarité (in French). Librairie Droz S.A. ISBN 9782600003551.
