= Alessandro Peretti di Montalto =

Italian Catholic Cardinal Bishop

His Eminence Alessandro Peretti di Montalto
- Cardinal-Bishop of Albano
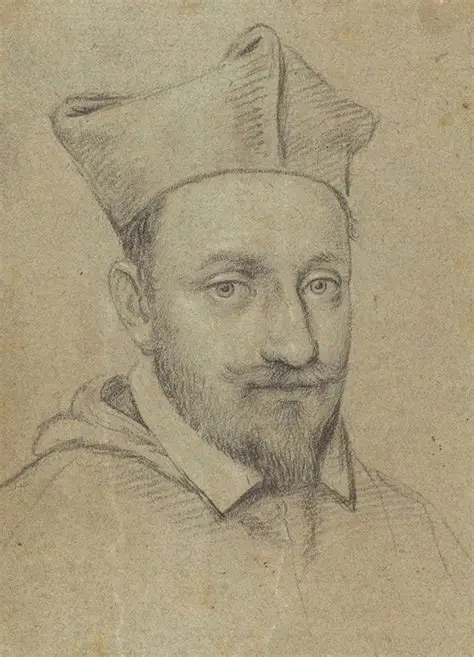
- Drawing of Cardinal Peretti, by Ottavio Leoni, 17th century
- Church: Catholic Church
- Appointed: 6 April 1620
- Term ended: 2 June 1623
- Predecessor: Francesco Sforza
- Successor: Giovanni Battista Deti
- Previous posts: See list: Cardinal-Deacon of San Girolamo dei Croati (1585–1587); Cardinal-Deacon of Sant'Eustachio (1587-1589); Cardinal-Priest of San Lorenzo in Damaso (1589-1620)

Orders
- Created cardinal: 13 May 1585 by Pope Sixtus V
- Rank: Cardinal-Bishop

Personal details
- Born: Alessandro Damasceni Peretti di Montalto; 1571 Montalto delle Marche, Italy
- Died: 2 June 1623 (aged 51–52) Rome, Papal States
- Coat of arms: Alessandro Peretti di Montalto's coat of arms

Alessandro Damasceni Peretti di Montalto (1571 – 2 June 1623) was an Italian Catholic Cardinal Bishop. He received the title from his great-uncle Felice Piergentile after the latter was elected Pope Sixtus V on 24 April 1585, in the consistory on 13 May, and was installed as Cardinal Deacon of San Girolamo dei Croati on 14 June 1585; the cardinal was then fourteen years old. The Republic of Venice inscribed him in the Libro d'Oro as a patrician of Venice that same year. Though he was made the permanent governor of Fermo the following year, and was often the papal legate in Bologna, he was not made a bishop until 1620, when he became Cardinal-Bishop of Albano. He also served as Vice-Chancellor of the Holy Roman Church (1589–1623) and Cardinal Protector of the Kingdom of Poland (named on 19 September 1589 by King Sigismund III) and of several religious orders.

Alessandro Peretti was born at Montalto delle Marche, the son of Fabio Damasceni and Maria Felice Mignucci Peretti, who was a niece of the pope on her mother's side. Like his great-uncle before him, Alessandro Peretti was also known as Cardinal di Montalto. His primary works as a great patron were the Villa Lante at Bagnaia, where he contributed to the gardens a casino matching the earlier one, and the church (though not the facade) of Sant'Andrea della Valle in Rome, (begun in 1591), where Carlo Maderno constructed at the Cardinal's personal expense the second-largest dome in Rome, 1608 to 1621.

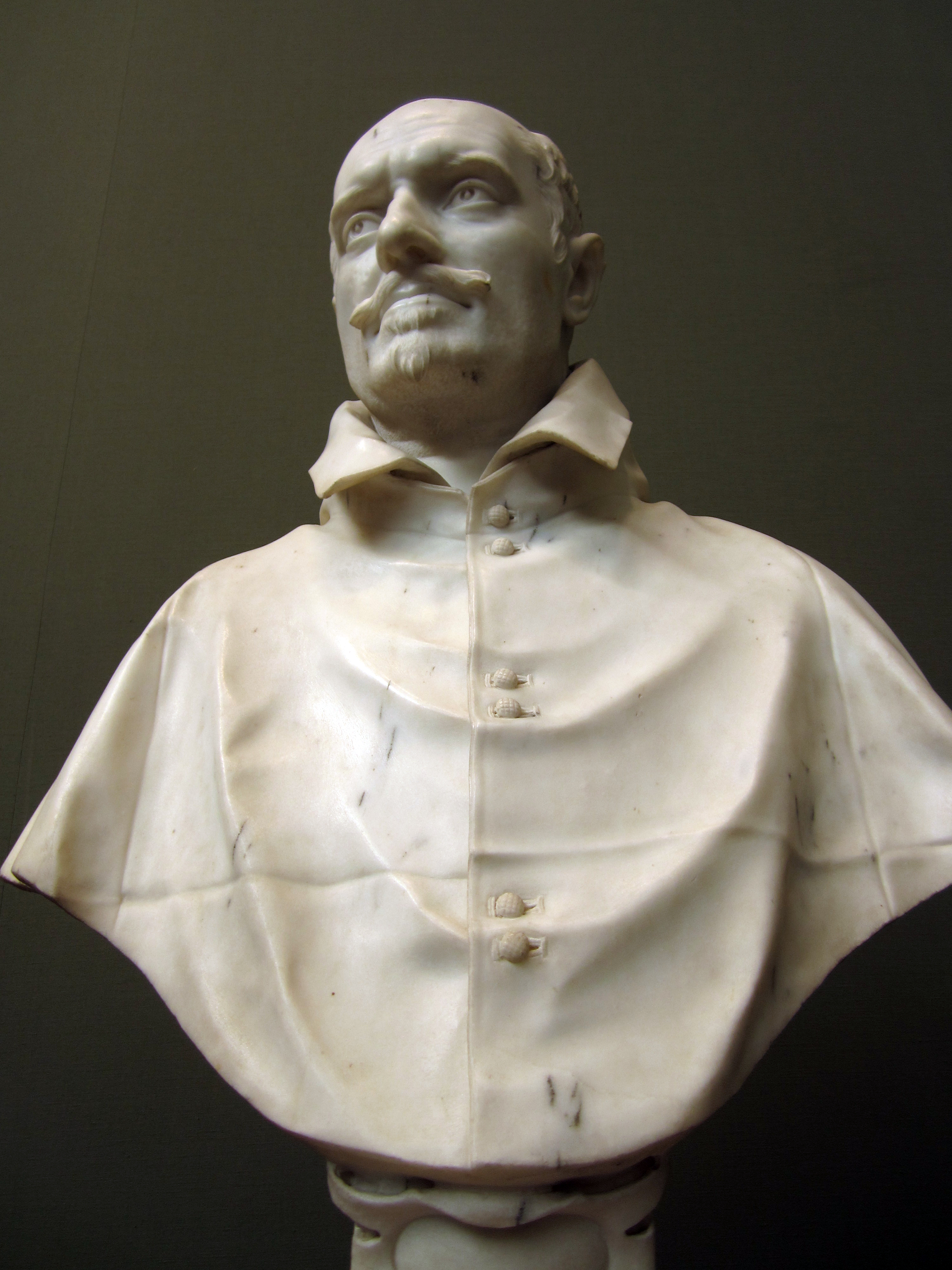
Bust of Alessandro Peretti di Montalto, sculpture by Gianlorenzo Bernini in Kunsthalle Hamburg

As a cardinal, Peretti lived an extravagant lifestyle in which he indulged his taste for music and lavish theatrical productions staged in his residence, the Cancelleria palace. He retained several musicians in his service and encouraged the art of monody or solo song.

His portrait bust by Gian Lorenzo Bernini is at the Hamburg Kunsthalle. Surviving books from Cardinal Alessandro's library reflect pride in his relationship to the Pope through elaborate armorials and his perfect taste.

Cardinal Montalto was in turn the uncle of Cardinal Francesco Peretti di Montalto (1597‑1655), raised to the purple in 1641.

== Sources ==
- James Chater, "Music and Patronage in Rome: the Case of Cardinal Montalto", Studi musicali, xvi (1987), 179–227
- Hill, John Walter, Roman Monody, Cantata, and Opera from the Circles around Cardinal Montalto. Two volumes. Oxford, Clarendon Press, 1997
