= Alfonso Visconti =

Italian cardinal (1552–1608)

His Eminence Alfonso Visconti
- Cardinal-Priest of San Sisto
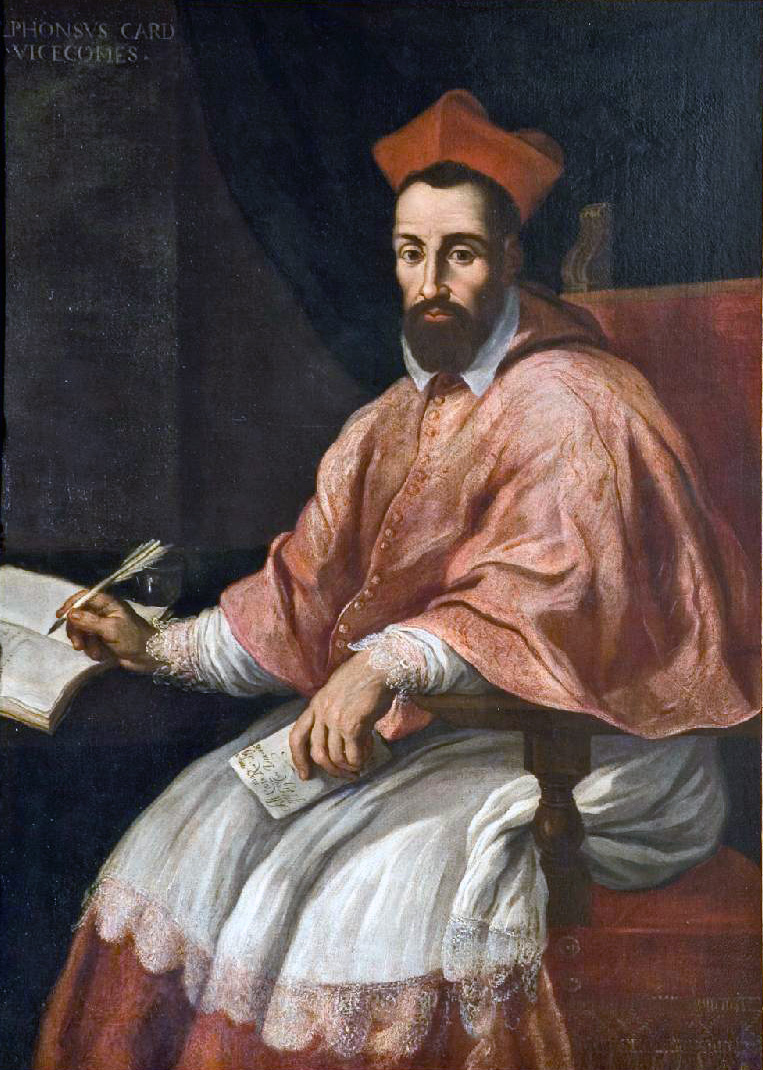
- Alfonso Visconti
- Church: Catholic Church
- See: Bishop of Spoleto

Orders
- Consecration: 14 July 1591 (Bishop) by Wolf Dietrich von Raitenau
- Created cardinal: 3 March 1599 by Pope Clement VIII
- Rank: cardinal priest

Personal details
- Born: 1552 Milan, Italy
- Died: 19 September 1608 (aged 55–56) Macerata, Italy

Alfonso Visconti (1552–1608) was an Italian Catholic cardinal and diplomat.

== Life ==
Alfonso Visconti was born in Milan in 1552. He was the son of Count Annibale, a member of the Saliceto branch of the noble family of Visconti, and of Lucia Sauli of Genoa.

He graduated in utroque iure in the University of Pavia and he moved to Rome. He was ordained a priest in 1575, and two years later he entered in the Oratory of Saint Philip Neri. His first important step in the ecclesiastical career was the appointment as referendary of the Tribunals of the Apostolic Signature of Justice and of Grace.

=== Diplomat ===
Pope Gregory XIII appointed him on 14 May 1584 Apostolic Nuncio to Portugal (with the title of Collector), an office he kept until 22 February 1586 when the Pope sent him vice-legate before Archduke Albert of Austria, ruler of the Habsburg Netherlands. When he returned to Rome, he was appointed Auditor of the Apostolic Camera by Pope Sixtus V.

The new Pope Gregory XIV, a distant relative, on 15 April 1489 appointed Alfonso as Apostolic Nuncio to the Emperor, and already on 4 July of that year he arrived in Prague where Emperor Rudolf II kept his court. As Nuncio, Alfonso tried without success to persuade the Emperor to appoint the Archduke Ernest of Austria as successor, and in 1590 he tried to quickly find a successor to the Archbishop of Prague, while this diocese, important for the fight against the Protestants, remained vacant for three years. He remained Nuncio to the Emperor up to 22 April 1591.

Pope Gregory XIV made him Bishop of Cervia on 8 February 1591 with the idea of sending him as Nuncio in Spain. He left Prague on 1 July 1591 and on the way back to Italy he was consecrated Bishop in Salzburg on 14 July by Wolf Dietrich von Raitenau. The sudden death of Pope Gregory XIV did not allow him to go to Spain, but he obtained some offices in the administration of the Papal States, being appointed Governor of the conclaves of 1591 and 1592 (and in the meantime also Governor of Borgo in Rome), and Governor of Ascoli Piceno, Norcia and of Montalto on 5 February 1592.

In 1595 the Pope entrusted him of the important diplomatic mission to the Prince of Transylvania Sigismund Báthory, in order to strengthen the Holy League organised by the Pope against the Ottoman Empire. Following the instructions of the Pope, Alfonso urged Sigismund Báthory to reconcile himself with the Emperor Rudolf II, and supported his cavalry with huge amounts of money. Before returning to Italy, Alfonso visited the King of Poland Sigismund III Vasa.

=== Cardinal ===
Pope Clement VIII elevated him to the dignity of cardinal in the consistory of 3 March 1599. Initially appointed as cardinal priest of the Titular church of San Giovanni a Porta Latina, on 24 January 1600 until he was appointed cardinal priest of San Sisto Vecchio.

From 10 September 1601 until his death, Alfonso Visconti served as Bishop of Spoleto and from 1604 to 1607 as Cardinal Protector for the Austrian hereditary lands. Cardinal Visconti participated in the two conclaves of March 1605 and May 1605, where he had several bones broken during an altercation.

On 23 October 1606 he was made Legate (i.e. Governor) of the Marche region, based in the town of Macerata, where he fought the bandits present in the Apennine Mountains. He died in Macerata on 19 September 1608 and he was buried in the Basilica of Loreto.

Catholic Church titles
Preceded by Giovanni Andrea Caligari	Apostolic Collector to Portugal; 1584–1586	Succeeded by Fabio Biondi
Preceded by Antonio Puteo	Apostolic Nuncio to Emperor; 1589–1591	Succeeded by Camillo Caetani
Preceded by Annibal Pauli	Bishop of Cervia; 1591–1601	Succeeded by Bonifazio Bevilacqua Aldobrandini
Preceded by Ottavio Paravicini	Cardinal-Priest of San Giovanni a Porta Latina; 1591–1601	Succeeded by Bernard Maciejowski
Preceded by Jerzy Radziwiłł	Cardinal-Priest of San Sisto; 1600–1608	Succeeded by Giambattista Leni
Preceded by Paolo Sanvitale	Bishop of Spoleto; 1601–1608	Succeeded by Maffeo Barberini
