= Séraphin Olivier-Razali =

Italian Catholic cardinal

His Eminence Séraphin Olivier-Razali
- Cardinal-Priest of San Salvatore in Lauro
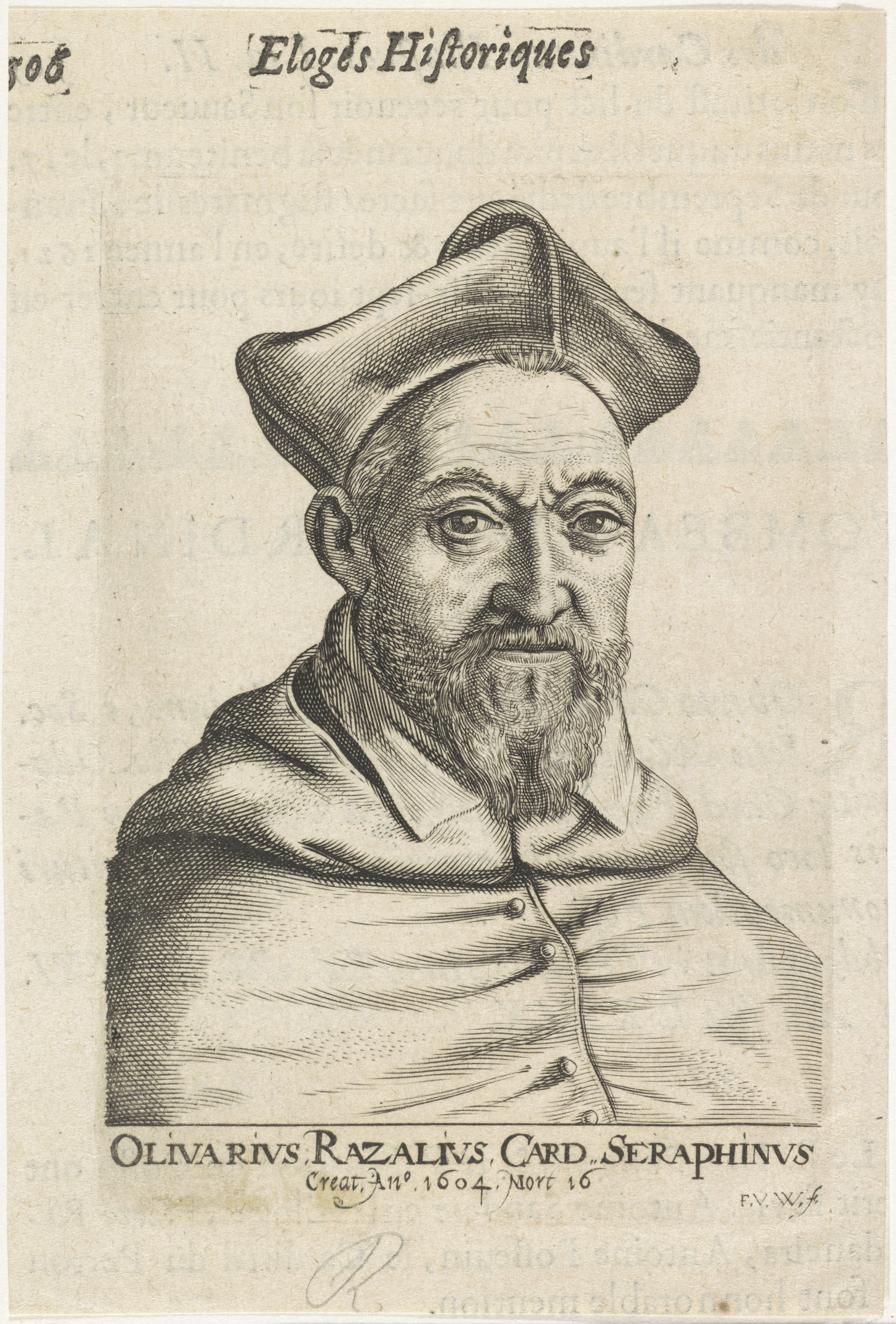
- Church: Catholic Church
- Installed: 25 June 1604
- Term ended: 10 February 1609
- Predecessor: Silvio Antoniano
- Successor: Orazio Lancellotti
- Other post: Titular Patriarch of Alexandria (1602–1604)

Orders
- Consecration: 15 September 1602 by Arnaud d'Ossat
- Created cardinal: 9 June 1604 by Pope Clement VIII

Personal details
- Born: 2 August 1538 Lyon, Kingdom of France
- Died: 10 February 1609 (aged 70)

Séraphin Olivier-Razali (2 August 1538 – 10 February 1609) was a French Roman Catholic cardinal.
