= Francesco Mantica =

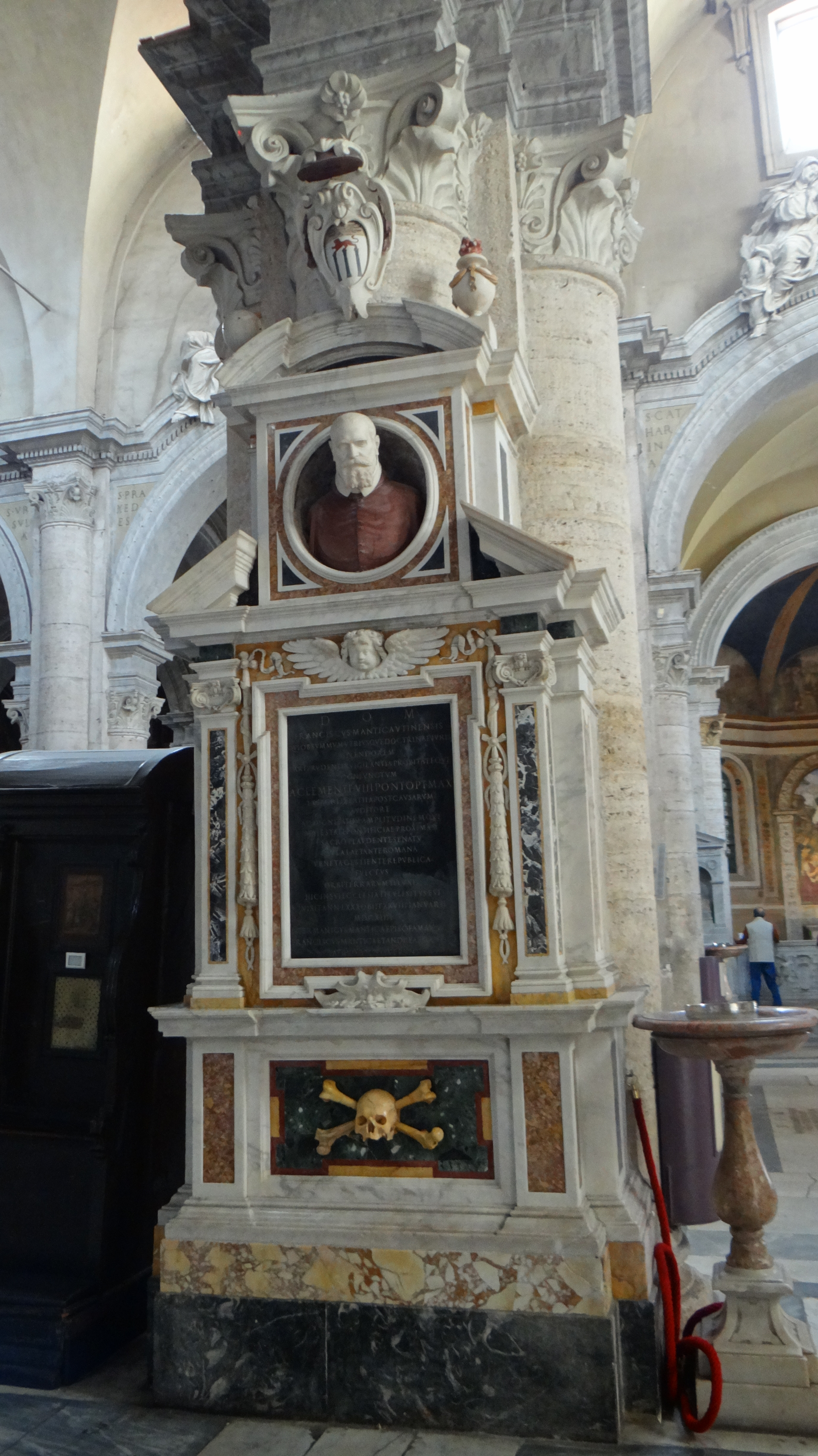
Monument of Cardinal Francesco Mantica in Santa Maria del Popolo, Rome

Francesco Mantica (1534–1614) was a Roman Catholic cardinal.

== Biography ==
He was born in Udine, and studied canon law at the University of Padua. He became auditor of the Rota and Capella di Mano of pope Clement VIII, who named Mantica as cardinal in 1596. He died in Rome and is buried in Santa Maria del Popolo. He wrote De conjecturis ultimatum voluntatum (about last will and testaments), lib XI, published in 1754.
