= March–April 1605 conclave =

Election of Catholic Pope Leo XI

Papal conclave March–April 1605

Dates and location
- 14 March – 1 April 1605; Apostolic Palace, Papal States
- Electors: 60 (list)

Elected pope
- Alessandro de' Medici; Name taken: Leo XI
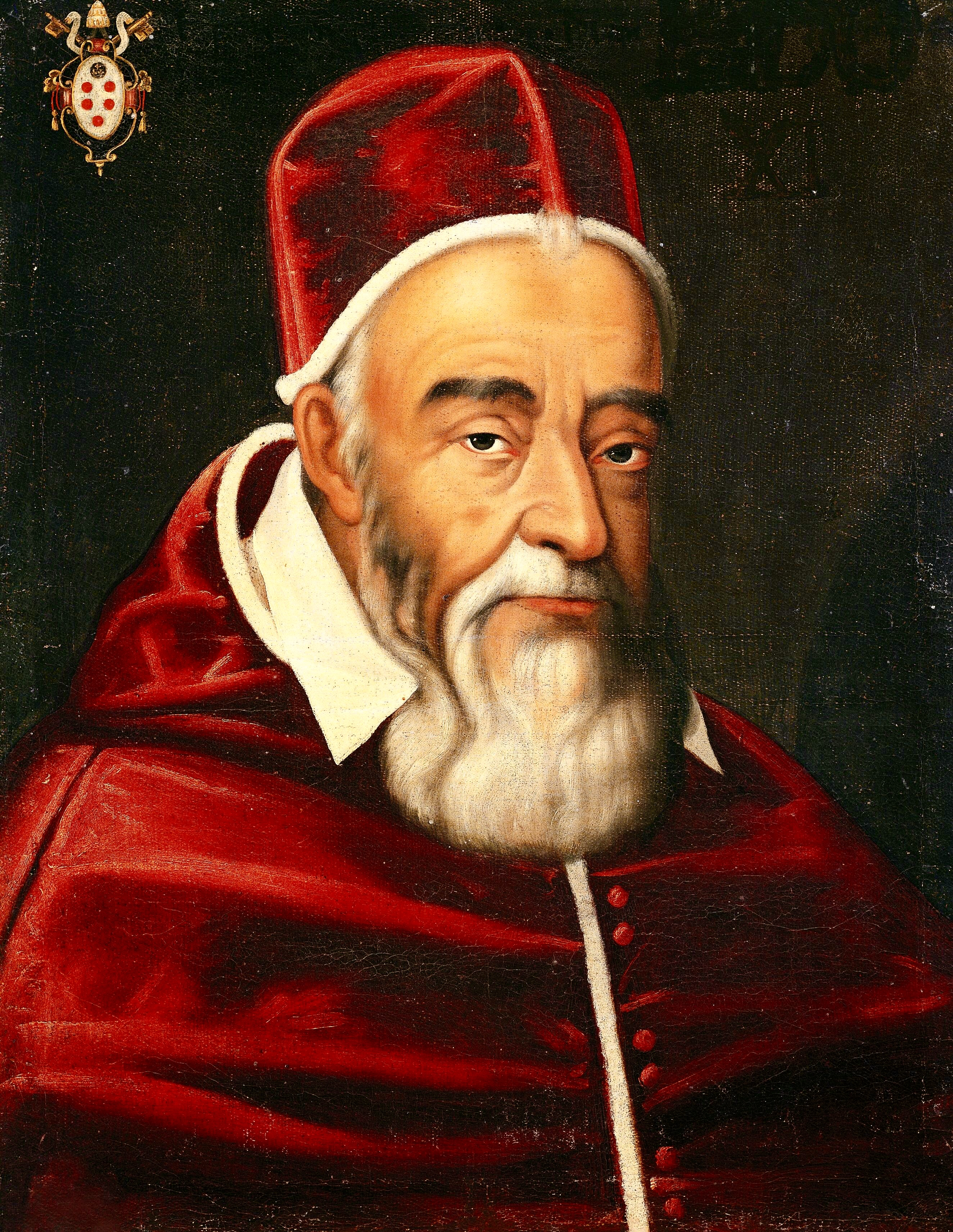

The March–April 1605 conclave was convened on the death of Clement VIII and ended with the election of Cardinal Alessandro de' Medici as Pope Leo XI. It was the first of the two papal conclaves in 1605; Leo XI died on 27 April 1605, just twenty-six days after he was elected. The conclave was dominated by conflict over whether Cardinal Cesare Baronius should be elected pope, and Philip III of Spain excluded both Baronius and the eventually successful candidate, Medici.

== Background ==
On 17 September 1595, Clement VIII accepted the decision of Henry IV of France to convert to the Catholic Church, which Henry had previously made to secure the French monarchy, and presided over a ceremony of papal absolution that removed the excommunication order placed on him by Sixtus V. The Spanish faction had previously opposed the pope taking these actions, but the French negotiators had talked about the possibility of a schism; this, along with Henry's victories in the French Wars of Religion, overcame Spanish opposition.

Clement also formed a commission that annulled Henry's marriage to Marguerite of Valois following the death of his mistress Gabrielle d'Estrées. Afterwards, Clement helped arrange Henry's marriage to Marie de' Medici that ensured a Catholic succession.

Clement worked to decrease the influence of Spanish cardinals in the College of Cardinals; he created five French cardinals and the Italian cardinals he created were considered neutral. Clement wanted the French cardinals he created to be present in Rome and to take part in the governance of the Church. Henry IV likewise demanded that three French cardinals go to Rome, and they were present at Clement's death on 3 March 1605.

In addition to the secular politics that impacted them, papal elections during this period were marked by a strategy by elite families who wanted to acquire prestige and power. These strategies often played out over several generations through patronage and the accumulation of wealth, and the bestowing of favours on family members once an individual was elected to the papacy was expected.

When Clement died, there was an unresolved dispute between the Society of Jesus and the Dominican Order about the nature of divine grace and free will. The cardinals who entered the conclave took oaths promising to resolve the dispute quickly if they were elected pope.

== Participants ==
Pope Nicholas II had reserved the right to elect the pope to the cardinal bishops, priests, and deacons of Rome in 1059. In 1586, Pope Sixtus V mandated that the maximum number of cardinals would be seventy. Of this seventy, the College of Cardinals had sixty-nine members at the time of Clement VIII's death but only sixty of these were present for the opening of the first conclave of 1605, and sixty-one electors were present for the election of Leo XI.

When it was convened, the college contained members who had been created by six different popes: Pius IV, Sixtus V, Gregory XIII, Gregory XIV, Innocent IX, and Clement VIII. Of these, Clement's creations were the most numerous, numbering thirty-eight of the cardinal-electors. Innocent IX had created one of the conclave's electors; Gregory XIV had created five, Sixtus V had created eleven, Gregory XIII had created four, and Pius IV had created one. (Note: Pastor lists Gregory XIII as having six electors, attributing Bernerio and Pinelli to him, and Sixtus V as having nine. Eubel counts them as being created by Sixtus V and gives specific dates for their creations as cardinals.)

Pietro Aldobrandini, the cardinal-nephew of Clement VIII, was the elector who led the faction with the largest number of votes, having twenty-two of Clement's thirty-eight creations following his instructions. Alessandro Peretti di Montalto, the nephew of Sixtus V, led a faction of eight cardinals. Thirteen of the cardinal electors were loyal to the Spanish monarchy; these electors and the faction loyal to Montalto were aligned. In addition to these groups, eight of the electors formed a faction that was loyal to the French crown.

== Conclave ==
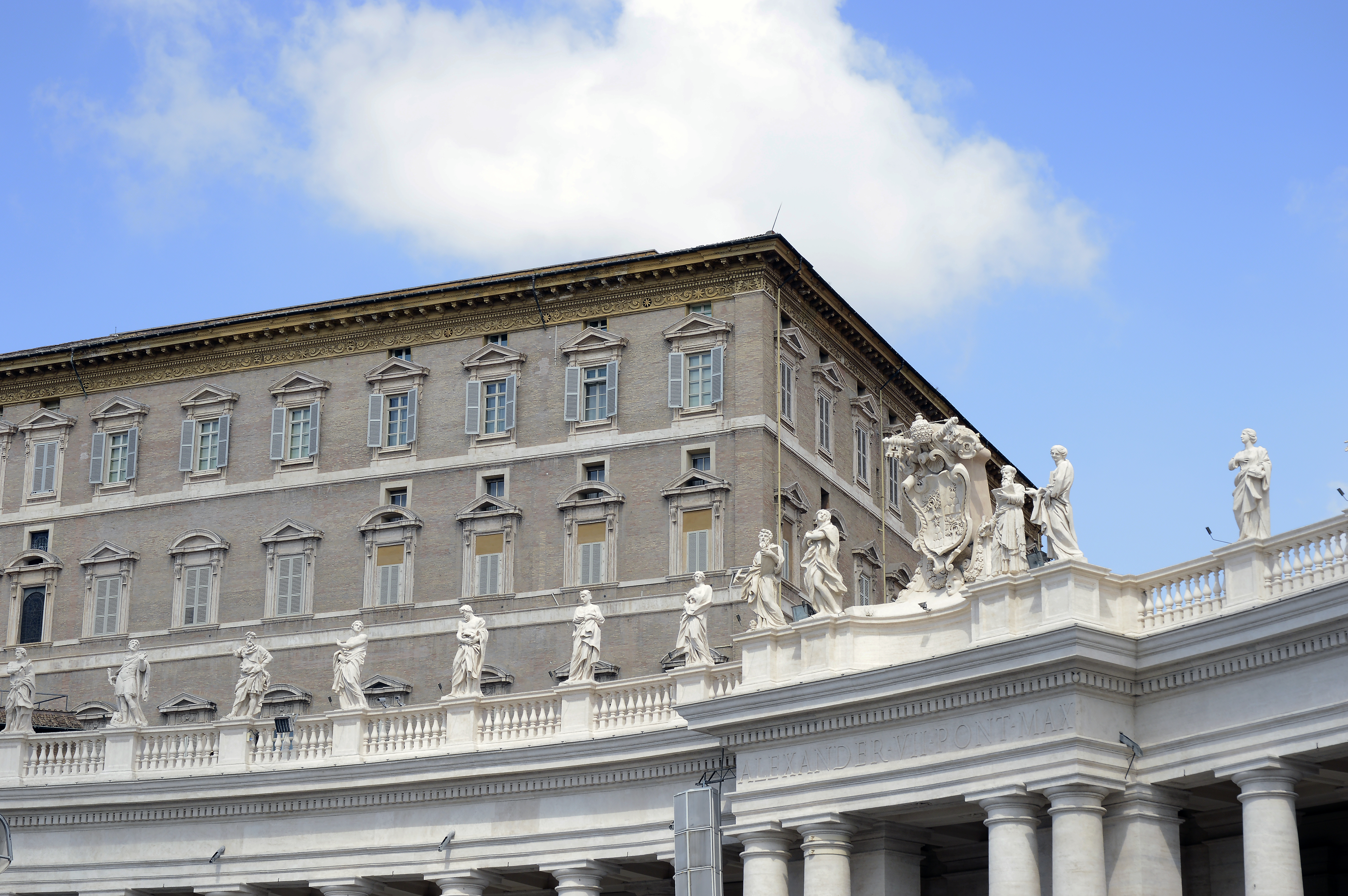
The conclave took place in the Apostolic Palace in Rome.

Sources from the time of the conclave list up to twenty-one possible candidates considered by the cardinals but only Cesare Baronius and Alessandro Ottaviano de' Medici, both of whom were supported by the French but opposed by the Spanish, were seriously discussed during the conclave. Baronius was the favourite candidate; the odds of him being elected were 10:100 according to Roman bookmakers, who took bets on the election despite the prohibition of the practice by Gregory XIV. Baronius received 23 votes during the first scrutiny; this was considered good because many electors who supported him had cast their first ballots for friends. France favoured Baronius, who also had the backing of the French cardinals. He was also the first-choice candidate of Pietro Aldobrandini, the nephew of Clement VIII, who sought to elect a cardinal who was created by his uncle, as was Baronius.

Aldobrondini had reached an agreement with the French government through François de Joyeuse to withdraw support from Antonio Maria Gallo. In return, Aldobrandini demanded that the French would not support Girolamo Bernerio and Alessandro Peretti di Montalto. The French also agreed not to veto Paolo Emilio Zacchia, Aldobrondini's secret candidate in this election.

After the results of the first scrutiny, Cardinal Avila, Philip III of Spain's representative at the conclave, announced that Philip had vetoed Baronius, who in a volume of his Annales Ecclesiastici that had been published in 1605 had criticized the interference of Spanish monarchs in ecclesiastical affairs. This led the Spanish monarchy to so intensely dislike Baronius that the publication of the volume was banned in Spanish territory. Some of the electors loyal to Spain were displeased with Baronious's exclusion and Filippo Spinelli was hostile to it. Federico Borromeo and Francesco Sforza were also thought to be angry with the exclusion.

Baronius's exclusion by Avila led to a clash with Aldobrandini; the cardinals began raising their voices at each other, each stating that he would be willing to make the conclave last over a year to elect his preferred candidate. Avila and Aldobrandini fought a second time, which led to shouting and pushing; the crowds outside mistakenly took this as a sign of election by acclamation and opened the doors of the conclave while it was still in session.

At this point, the Spanish hoped cardinals Guevera, Colona, and Zappata would arrive before the end of the conclave to aid their numbers but they did not arrive. Likewise, Aldobrandini hoped for the arrival of Cardinal Ginasio, who also did not enter the conclave before it ended. The only additional cardinal elector to arrive was Franz von Dietrichstein; the anti-Spanish party attempted to win his support for Baronius by reminding him of favours he had received from Clement VIII, ultimately, however, Giovanni Andrea Doria, Carlo Gaudenzio Madruzzo, and Odoardo Farnese—all of whom were loyal to Spain—persuaded him to oppose Baronius.

Baronius came within nine votes of election; thirty-two of the electors supported him but he refused to advocate his own election or accept election by acclamation. Aldobrandini could not persuade some members of his faction to vote for Baronius, whom they viewed as too strict. By 30 March, Aldobrandini had resigned himself to looking for other candidates.

== Election of Leo XI ==
The election was further complicated by struggles between the factions loyal to Aldobrandini and Montalto, whose approximately equal numbers cancelled each other out. The initial scrutiny on 1 April yielded twenty-eight votes for Baronius and thirteen for Medici. The French cardinal François de Joyeuse had been seeking Medici's election throughout the conclave and had secured the support of Montalto for his candidate. Montalto was allied with the Spanish and had previously backed Tolomeo Gallio. Joyeuse had been anticipating Aldobrandini's support for the election of Medici but this did not occur immediately. Aldobrandini supported Laudivio Zacchia, but eventually transferred his support to Medici. Aldobrandini was eventually persuaded of the need to elect Medici, switching his vote to Medici upon hearing Baronius urging his rival's immediate election.

Aldobrondini then went to Medici's room, where more than two-thirds of the electors had gathered, and they elected Medici pope. Medici was related to Marie de' Medici, Queen of France; the French king Henry IV had spent significant money on his candidacy.

After Medici's election, Avila revealed that Philip III had excluded Medici as well, and protested so loudly he could be heard on the street. The cardinals who had elected Medici answered that protesting the election was useless once the candidate had been elected pope. Following his election in his room, a scrutiny confirming the result was held. Upon his election, Medici took the name Leo XI in honour of his great-uncle Leo X. His election made Leo the fourth cardinal created by Gregory XIII in his consistory in 1583 to become pope.

Leo's election was seen as a victory for France because he was a relative of the French queen. After his election, supporters of the French crown celebrated in Rome's streets. Leo's reign, however, was limited to the month of April 1605; he caught a cold while appearing in public and died on 27 April 1605, twenty-six days after his election.
