= Pope Leo XI =

Head of the Catholic Church in 1605

- Bishop of Rome
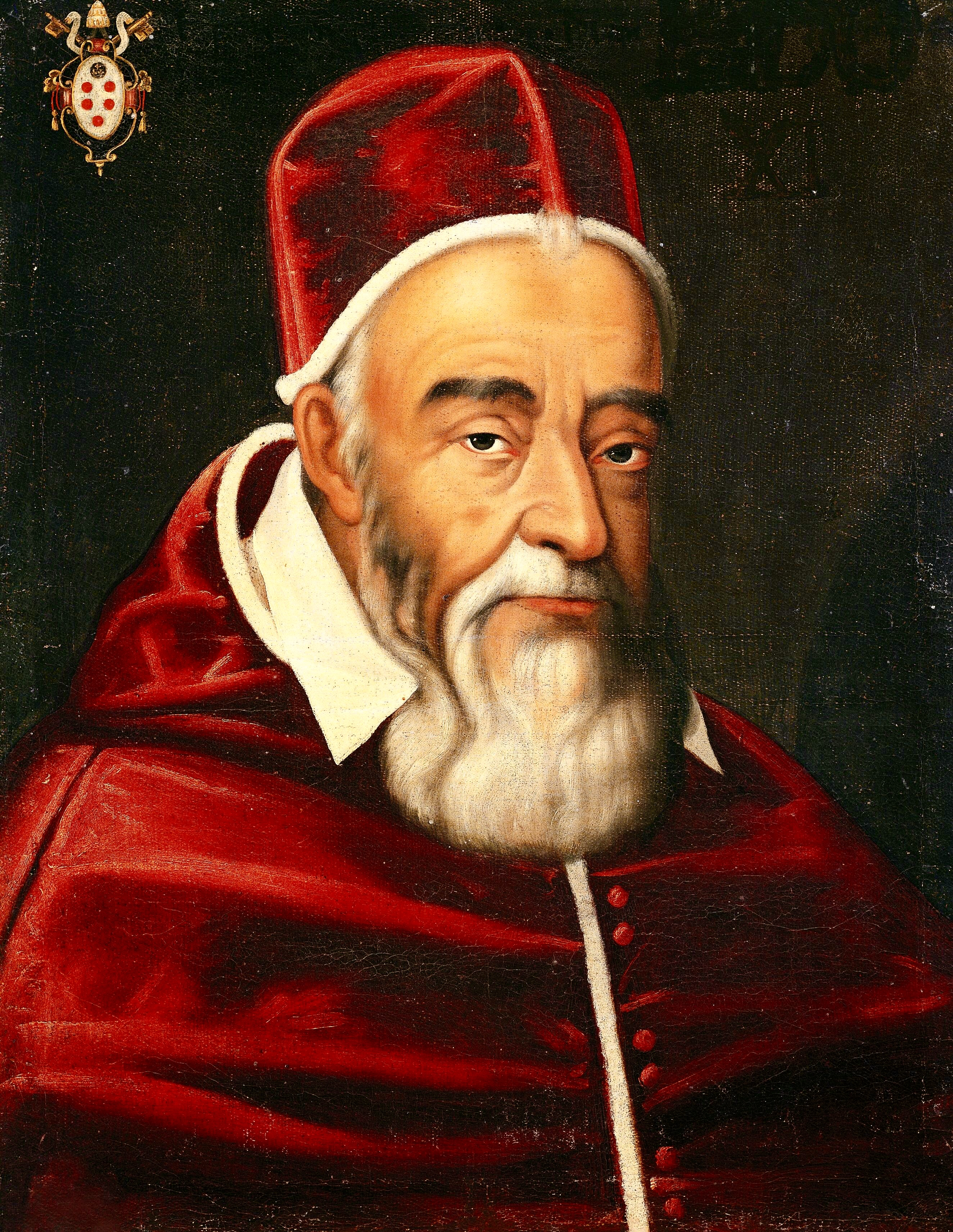
- Portrait of Leo XI c. 1605
- Church: Catholic Church
- Papacy began: 1 April 1605
- Papacy ended: 27 April 1605
- Predecessor: Clement VIII
- Successor: Paul V
- Previous posts: Bishop of Pistoia (1573); Archbishop of Florence (1574–1596); Cardinal-Priest of Santi Quirico e Giulitta (1583–1591); Cardinal-Priest of Santi Giovanni e Paolo (1591–1592); Cardinal-Priest of Santa Prassede (1592–1594); Cardinal-Priest of San Pietro in Vincoli (1594–1600); Prefect of the Congregation of Bishops and Regulars (1598–1605); Cardinal-Priest of Santa Maria in Trastevere (1600); Cardinal-Bishop of Albano (1600–1602); Cardinal-Bishop of Palestrina (1602–1605)

Orders
- Ordination: 22 July 1567 by Antonio Altoviti
- Consecration: March 1573 by Francisco Pacheco de Villena (Toledo)
- Created cardinal: 12 December 1583 by Gregory XIII

Personal details
- Born: Alessandro di Ottaviano de' Medici; 2 June 1535 Florence, Duchy of Florence
- Died: 27 April 1605 (aged 69) Rome, Papal States

- Coat of arms

Pope Leo XI (Italian: Leone XI; 2 June 1535 – 27 April 1605), born Alessandro di Ottaviano de' Medici, was head of the Catholic Church and ruler of the Papal States from 1 April 1605 to his death, on 27 April 1605. His pontificate is one of the briefest in history, lasting under a month. He was from the prominent House of Medici originating from Florence.

In his career he served as Florence's ambassador to the pope, Bishop of Pistoia, Archbishop of Florence, Papal legate to France, and as the cardinal Prefect for the Congregation of Bishops and Regulars. He was elected to the papacy in the March 1605 papal conclave when he was almost seventy. He almost immediately suffered from fever and died 27 days into his papacy.

== Biography ==
=== Early life ===
Alessandro di Ottaviano de' Medici was born in Florence as the son of Ottaviano de' Medici and Francesca Salviati. His family belonged to Medici di Ottajano, a cadet branch of the House of Medici. Ottaviano died early in his son's life, and thereafter Alessandro was home schooled by a Dominican priest, Vincenzo Ercolano.

Alessandro's mother was a daughter of Lucrezia de' Medici and a sister of the influential cardinal Giovanni Salviati. Through her, Leo XI was a second cousin of Catherine de' Medici, Queen of France (both descended from Lorenzo the Magnificent). Francesca opposed Alessandro's entering the priesthood and sought to prevent it by having him given secular honours, but after her death he eventually was ordained a priest in 1567.

Alessandro felt the call to the priesthood, but his mother opposed this since he was the only male in the family. She sent him instead to the court of the Grand Duke of Tuscany, who appointed him a knight of San Stefano. In 1560 he travelled to Rome where he commenced a lifelong friendship and collaboration with Philip Neri, the future saint. It was Philip who predicted that Alessandro would ascend to the pontificate. His mother died in 1566, at which point he resumed his studies to become a priest. His ordination took place on 22 July 1567.

=== Priesthood ===
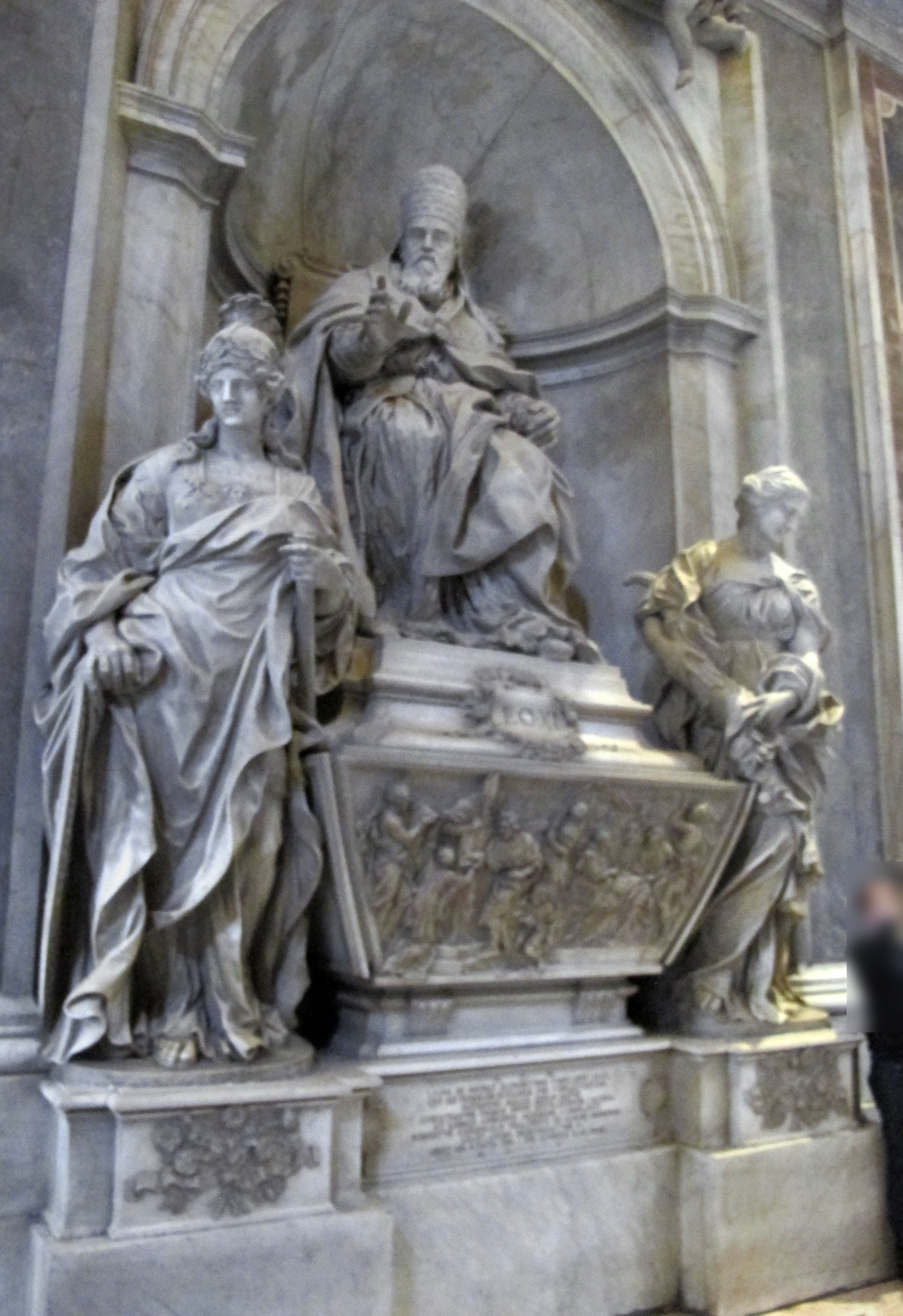
Tomb of Leo XI in St. Peter's Basilica, by Alessandro Algardi

Alessandro served as the Florentine ambassador to Pope Pius V from 1569 to 1584 and in 1573 was appointed by Pope Gregory XIII Bishop of Pistoia. In March 1573 he received episcopal consecration in Rome. In 1574 he was made Archbishop of Florence.

In 1583 he was made a cardinal by Pope Sixtus V and on 9 January 1584 received the title of Cardinal-Priest of Santi Quirico e Giulitta, after a titular church previously known as San Ciriaco alle Terme Diocleziane. In later years, according to custom he would opt for other titular churches.

In 1596 Pope Clement VIII sent Alessandro as a papal legate to France, where he remained until 1598, when he received word of his appointment as Prefect of the Congregation of Bishops and Regulars.

== Pontificate ==
=== Papal election ===
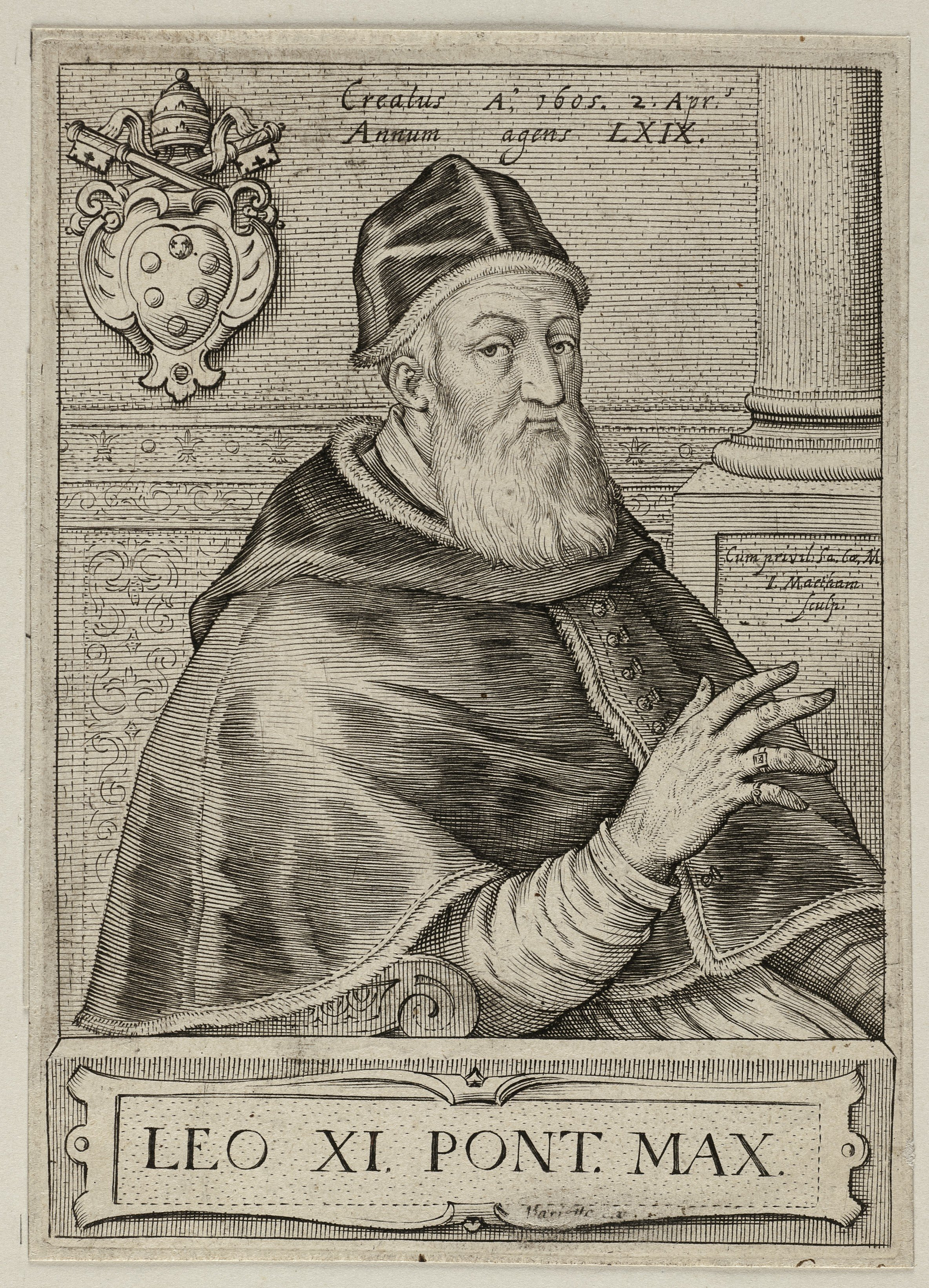
Engraving of Leo XI by Jacob Matham, 1605

On 14 March 1605, eleven days after the death of Clement VIII, 62 cardinals entered the conclave. Prominent among the candidates for the papacy were the great historian Caesar Baronius and the famous Jesuit controversialist Robert Bellarmine, future saint.

But Pietro Aldobrandini, the leader of the Italian party among the cardinals, allied with the French cardinals and brought about the election of Alessandro against the express wish of King Philip III of Spain. King Henry IV of France is said to have spent 300,000 écus in the promotion of Alessandro's candidacy.

On 1 April 1605, Cardinal Alessandro de' Medici was elected as pope. He chose to be called Leo XI in honor of his uncle Pope Leo X. He was crowned on 10 April 1605 by the protodeacon, Cardinal Francesco Sforza and he took possession of the Basilica of Saint John Lateran on 17 April 1605.

== Death ==
When he was elected, Leo XI was almost 70 years of age, and he died 27 days later. His death came as a result of fatigue and cold in the ceremony of taking possession of the Basilica of St John Lateran on 17 April; he started suffering from a fever the following day.

== See also ==
- List of popes
- List of popes from the Medici family
- List of popes by length of reign

Catholic Church titles
Preceded by Clement VIII	Pope; 1–27 April 1605	Succeeded by Paul V
