= Caesar Baronius =

Italian cardinal and ecclesiastical historian (1538–1607)

Venerable Cesare Baronio CO
- Cardinal Priest of Santi Nereo ed Achilleo
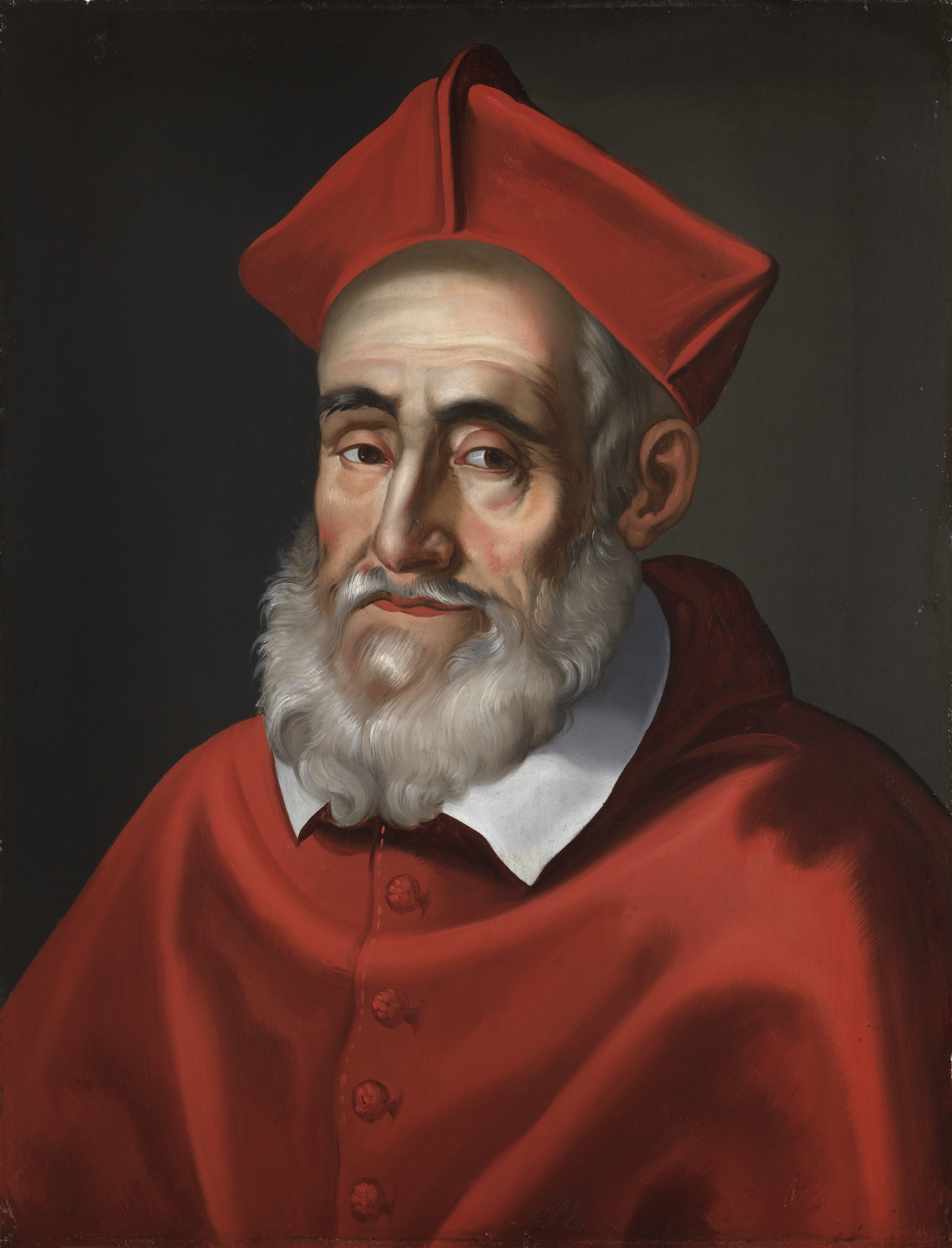
- Church: Catholic Church
- Appointed: 21 June 1596
- Term ended: 30 June 1607
- Predecessor: Gianfrancesco Morosini
- Successor: Innocenzo Del Bufalo-Cancellieri
- Other post: Librarian of the Vatican Library (1597 – 1607)

Orders
- Ordination: 27 May 1564
- Created cardinal: 5 June 1596 by Pope Clement VIII
- Rank: Cardinal-Priest

Personal details
- Born: Cesare Baronio; 30 August 1538 Sora, Duchy of Sora
- Died: 30 June 1607 (aged 68) Rome, Papal States
- Buried: Santa Maria in Vallicella

Styles of Caesar Baronius
- Reference style: His Eminence
- Spoken style: Your Eminence
- Informal style: Cardinal

Cesare Baronio, known more commonly as Caesar Baronius^{[a]} CO (30 August 1538 – 30 June 1607), was an Italian Oratorian, cardinal and historian of the Catholic Church. His best-known works are his Annales Ecclesiastici ("Ecclesiastical Annals"), which appeared in 12 folio volumes (1588–1607). He is a candidate for sainthood, having been declared venerable in 1745 by then-Pope Benedict XIV.

== Life ==
Cesare Baronio was born in the Duchy of Sora (present day Sora in Italy) on 31 October 1538, the only child of Camillo Baronio and his wife Porzia Febonia. His family was of Neapolitan origin.

Baronio was educated at Veroli and Naples, where he commenced his law studies in October 1556. Because of the fear of an imminent French invasion, he left Naples on 29 October 1557, and traveled to Rome, where he continued his legal studies and obtained a doctorate in utroque iure in 1561. He took up residence in a house on the Piazza Duca, now the Piazza Farnese, not far from the church of San Girolamo della Carità, where Philip Neri lived. Baronio was soon drawn to the circle of Philip Neri, who opened a meeting place for churchmen and laity who were interested in intellectual discussions on religion and philosophy. The Bible, church reform, ethics, and liturgy were some of the main themes of their evening discussions. Among those who frequented the evening meetings at Neri's residence were some of the most influential church leaders of the Counter-Reformation - Charles Borromeo, Federico Borromeo, Jacopo Sadoleto, and Gian Matteo Giberti, to name a few.

Contacts with such illustrious humanist-reformers and the charismatic Neri brought about a dramatic change in the young Baronio. As a result he switched his main interest from law to theology. In 1557 Baronio became a member of the Congregation of the Oratory founded by Philip Neri, and was ordained to the subdiaconate on 21 December 1560 and to the diaconate on 20 May 1561. Ordination to the priesthood followed in 1564.

Neri directed Baronius to focus his attention on the study and explanation of Church History. Baronius spent the next few years balancing his studies, lectures, and continued involvement in apostolic work. In 1588, he began to publish the Annales. He succeeded Philip Neri as superior of the Roman Oratory in 1593.

Pope Clement VIII, whose confessor he was from 1594, made him a cardinal on 5 June 1596 and also appointed him to head the Vatican Library. Baronio was given the red hat on 8 June and on 21 June was assigned the title of Cardinal Priest of Santi Nereo e Achilleo. Baronio restored this titular church and in 1597 a procession was held to transfer there a number of relics. Baronius also renovated the Church of San Gregorio Magno al Celio.

At subsequent conclaves, Baronio was twice considered to be papabile – the conclaves which in the event elected Pope Leo XI and Pope Paul V. On each occasion, Baronio was opposed by Spain on account of his work "On the Monarchy of Sicily", in which he supported the papal claims against those of the Spanish government. In 1602 he commissioned the Oratorio di Santa Silvia in San Gregorio Magno al Celio.

Baronio's last days were spent in the Oratory at Santa Maria in Vallicella. He found solace in the humble surroundings of the Oratory and in the company of his fellow Oratorians. There he died on 30 June 1607, and was buried in that same church. He was named "Venerable", an honor to which Pope Benedict XIV elevated him in 1745.

== Works ==
Baronio is best known for his Annales Ecclesiastici. It was after almost three decades of lecturing at Santa Maria in Vallicella that he was asked by Philip Neri to tackle this work, as an answer to a polemical anti-Catholic historical work, the Magdeburg Centuries. Baronio was at first unwilling that the task should be given to him and tried to persuade Neri to entrust the work to Onofrio Panvinio, who was already working on a history of the Church. After repeated commands from Neri, however, Baronius changed his mind and spent the rest of his life devoted to this enormous task.

In the Annales, he treats history in strict chronological order and keeps theology in the background. Lord Acton called it "the greatest history of the Church ever written". In the Annales, Baronio coined the term "Dark Age" in the Latin form saeculum obscurum, to refer to the period between the end of the Carolingian Empire in 888 and the first inklings of the Gregorian Reform under Pope Clement II in 1046.

Notwithstanding its errors, especially in Greek history where he was obliged to depend upon secondhand information, Baronio's work stands as an honest attempt at historiography. Sarpi, in urging Casaubon to write a refutation of the Annales, warned him never to accuse or suspect Baronio of bad faith.

Baronio also undertook a new edition of the Roman Martyrology (1586). In the course of his work he applied critical considerations in removing entries he considered implausible for historical reasons, and added or corrected others according to what he found in the sources to which he had access. He is also considered as saying, cited in the context of the controversies about the work of Copernicus and Galileo, "The Bible teaches us how to go to heaven, not how the heavens go." This remark, which probably Baronio (according to some) made in conversation with Galileo, before the controversy, as he died before it, was cited by the latter (without precise attribution) in his Letter to the Grand Duchess Christina (1615).

At the time of the Venetian Interdict, Baronio published a pamphlet, Paraenesis ad rempublicam Venetam (1606). It took a stringent papalist line on the crisis. It was answered in the same year by the Antiparaenesis ad Caesarem Baronium of Nicolò Crasso.

== Biographies ==
A Latin biography of Baronio by the oratorian Hieronymus Barnabeus (Girolamo Barnabeo or Barnabò) appeared in 1651 as Vita Caesaris Baronii. Another Oratorian, Raymundus Albericus (Raimondo Alberici), edited three volumes of Baronio's correspondence from 1759. There are other biographies by Amabel Kerr (1898), and by Generoso Calenzio (La vita e gli scritti del cardinale Cesare Baronio, Rome 1907). The works of Mario Borrelli also contributed to the biographia of Baronius.

== Beatification ==
Baronio left a reputation for sanctity, which led Pope Benedict XIV to approve the introductions of his cause for canonization; Baronio was proclaimed "Venerable" on 12 January 1745.

In 2007, on the 400th anniversary of his death, a petition was presented by the Procurator General of the Oratory of St Philip Neri. to reopen the cause for his canonization.

== Other sources ==
- Angelo Giuseppe Roncalli. "Il cardinale Cesare Baronio. Nel terzo centenario della sua morte," in La Scuola Cattolica (Monza), XXXVI, 1908, no. 12, pp. 1–29. (Reprinted with preface and notes by Giuseppe De Luca, Edizioni di Storia e Letteratura, Roma, 1961) Roncalli's episcopal motto 'Obedientia et Pax' was taken from Baronio. [Peter Hebblethwaite JOHN XXIII: POPE OF THE CENTURY 2005 edition, p. 57.]
- Miranda, Salvador. "Biographical Dictionary - Consistory of June 5, 1596 - BARONIO, Orat., Cesare (1538-1607)". The Cardinals of the Holy Roman Church. Florida International University. OCLC 53276621.
- This article incorporates text from a publication now in the public domain: Taunton, Ethelred Luke (1911). "Baronius, Caesar". In Chisholm, Hugh (ed.). Encyclopædia Britannica. Vol. 3 (11th ed.). Cambridge University Press. p. 424.
- Pincherle, Alberto (1964). "BARONIO, Cesare". Dizionario Biografico degli Italiani (in Italian). Vol. 6: Baratteri–Bartolozzi. Rome: Institute of the Italian Encyclopaedia. OCLC 883370.
- This article incorporates text from a publication now in the public domain: Herbermann, Charles, ed. (1913). "Venerable Cesare Baronius". Catholic Encyclopedia. New York: Robert Appleton Company.

== Notes ==
^[a] The Latin rendition of his name — Caesar Baronius — is the name by which he was known in most of his writings and correspondences, as clerics, academics, and scholars of his contemporary early modern period primarily communicated and published in Latin.
