= 1681 =

1681 in various calendars
- Gregorian calendar: 1681; MDCLXXXI
- Ab urbe condita: 2434
- Armenian calendar: 1130; ԹՎ ՌՃԼ
- Assyrian calendar: 6431
- Balinese saka calendar: 1602–1603
- Bengali calendar: 1087–1088
- Berber calendar: 2631
- English Regnal year: 32 Cha. 2 – 33 Cha. 2
- Buddhist calendar: 2225
- Burmese calendar: 1043
- Byzantine calendar: 7189–7190
- Chinese calendar: 庚申年 (Metal Monkey); 4378 or 4171 — to — 辛酉年 (Metal Rooster); 4379 or 4172
- Coptic calendar: 1397–1398
- Discordian calendar: 2847
- Ethiopian calendar: 1673–1674
- Hebrew calendar: 5441–5442
- Hindu calendars
- Vikram Samvat: 1737–1738
- Shaka Samvat: 1602–1603
- Kali Yuga: 4781–4782
- Holocene calendar: 11681
- Igbo calendar: 681–682
- Iranian calendar: 1059–1060
- Islamic calendar: 1091–1092
- Japanese calendar: Enpō 9 / Tenna 1 (天和元年)
- Javanese calendar: 1603–1604
- Julian calendar: Gregorian minus 10 days
- Korean calendar: 4014
- Minguo calendar: 231 before ROC 民前231年
- Nanakshahi calendar: 213
- Thai solar calendar: 2223–2224
- Tibetan calendar: ལྕགས་ཕོ་སྤྲེ་ལོ་ (male Iron-Monkey); 1807 or 1426 or 654 — to — ལྕགས་མོ་བྱ་ལོ་ (female Iron-Bird); 1808 or 1427 or 655

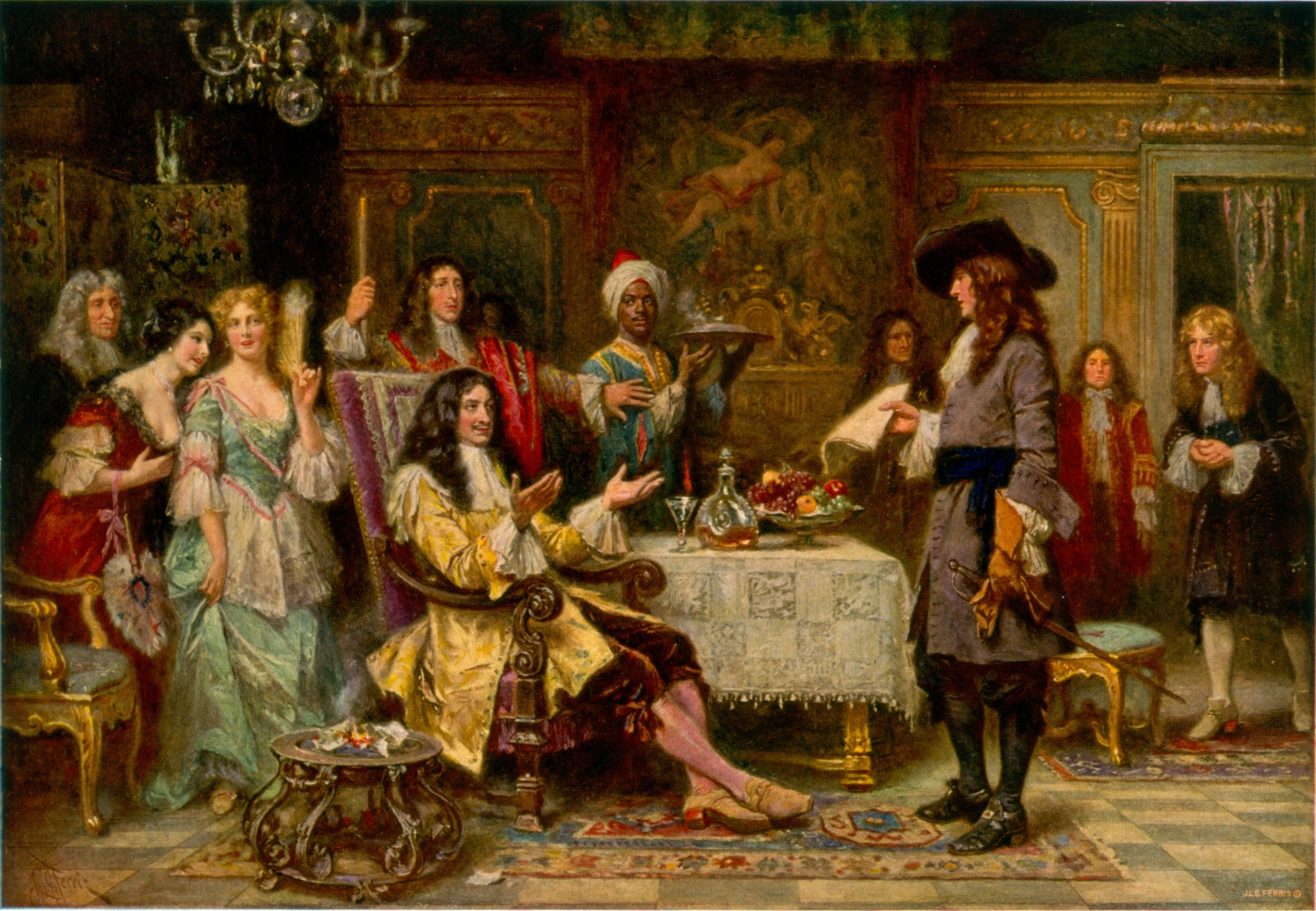
March 4: King Charles II of England grants land charter to William Penn British American territory west of Delaware River, later to become Pennsylvania.

1681 (MDCLXXXI) was a common year starting on Wednesday of the Gregorian calendar and a common year starting on Saturday of the Julian calendar, the 1681st year of the Common Era (CE) and Anno Domini (AD) designations, the 681st year of the 2nd millennium, the 81st year of the 17th century, and the 2nd year of the 1680s decade. As of the start of 1681, the Gregorian calendar was 10 days ahead of the Julian calendar, which remained in localized use until 1923.

== Events ==
=== January–March ===
- January 1 – Prince Muhammad Akbar, son of the Mughal Emperor Aurangzeb, initiates a civil war in India. With the support of troops from the Rajput states, Akbar declares himself the new Mughal Emperor and prepares to fight his father, but is ultimately defeated.
- January 3 – The Treaty of Bakhchisarai is signed, between the Ottoman vassal Crimean Khanate and the Russian Empire.
- January 18 – The "Exclusion Bill Parliament", summoned by King Charles II of England in October, is dissolved after three months, with directions that new elections be held, and that a new parliament be convened in March in Oxford.
- February 2 – In India, the Mughal Empire city of Burhanpur (now in the Indian state of Madhya Pradesh) is sacked and looted by troops of the Maratha Empire on orders of the Maratha emperor, the Chhatrapati Sambhaji. General Hambirrao Mohite began the pillaging three days earlier.
- March 4 – In order to settle a debt of £16,000, King Charles II of England grants a land charter to William Penn, for territory west of Delaware River in America between 40° N and 42° N, later to be called Pennsylvania.
- March 21 – The "Oxford Parliament" is summoned in England by King Charles II and meets in Oxford rather than in Westminster, but is dissolved seven days later. No further sessions of parliament are held until after the death of Charles in 1685.

=== April–June ===
- April 11 – Following the death of its last count, the Palatinate-Landsberg passes to the King of Sweden.
- May 15 – The Canal du Midi in France is opened officially, as the Canal Royal de Languedoc.
- June 23 – The Church of the East, an Eastern Orthodox rite in Mesopotamia (now Iraq), already split between two patriarchs in the Eliya line and the Shimun line, is split along a third line by the Roman Catholic Church when Mar Yousip of the Archdiocese of Amid (now Diyarbakır in Turkey) is proclaimed by Pope Innocent XI as Joseph I, "Patriarch of the Chaldean nation deprived of its patriarch", creating the "Josephite line" of the Chaldean Catholic Church.

=== July–September ===
- July 1 – Oliver Plunkett, Roman Catholic Archbishop of Armagh and Primate of All Ireland, falsely convicted in June of treason, is hanged, drawn and quartered at Tyburn, London, the last Catholic martyr to die in England; he is canonised in 1975.
- July 23 – The Bombardment of Chios during the French-Tripolitania War (1681-1685) is part of a wider campaign by France against the Barbary Pirates in the 1680s.
- August 10 – English sea captain Robert Knox of the East India Company publishes his book An Historical Relation of the Island Ceylon, about his adventures, 20-years imprisonment and escape from Ceylon.
- August 12 – Ahom King Gadadhar Singha (or Gadapani), who takes the Tai name Supaatphaa, ascends the throne.
- August 31 – English perjurer Titus Oates is told to leave his state apartments in Whitehall; his fame begins to wane, and he is soon arrested and imprisoned for sedition.
- September 30 – France annexes the city of Strasbourg (German: Strassburg), previously a free imperial city of the Holy Roman Empire.

=== October–December ===
- October 27 – Sir John Child of England becomes the new Governor of Bombay province and, unofficially, Governor-General of all of the settlements of the East India Company in India. With the exception of a rebellion by Captain Richard Keigwin during the year 1684, Child expands British control until involving the British in a war with the Mughal Empire.
- November 20 – Don Melchor de Navarra, Duke of Palata arrives in Lima after a voyage of almost 10 months from Spain and becomes the new Viceroy of Peru, succeeding the Archbishop of Lima, Melchor Liñán y Cisneros, who had administered the area since 1678.
- November 25 – Cornelis Speelman of the Netherlands becomes the new Governor-General of the Dutch East Indies (now Indonesia) and concludes an alliance with the Sultan Amangkurat II of the Mataram Sultanate on the island of Java, then uses the Dutch Army to suppress the rebellion started by the Sultan's half-brother, Prince Puger. Puger surrenders on November 28 to the ranking Dutch officer, Jacob Couper.
- November 29 – A storm strikes the Isthmus of Panama and overwhelms the Spanish Navy's Flota de Tierra Firma, sinking the ship Nuestra Señora de Encarnación in the Chagres River. The Encarnación wreckage is not found until almost 340 years later, in 2011, mostly intact and still loaded with most of its cargo.
- December 3 – Another ship in the Flota de Terra Firma, Nuestra Señora de la Soledad, sinks in the Chagres River with the loss of its 280 crew.
- December 7 – Wu Shifan, grandson of Chinese general Wu Sangui, commits suicide at Kunming in Yunnan province, ending the 8-year Revolt of the Three Feudatories against the Kangxi Emperor and the Qing dynasty in China.
- December 22 – King Charles II of England signs a warrant for the building of the Royal Hospital Chelsea in London for wounded and retired soldiers.

=== Date unknown ===
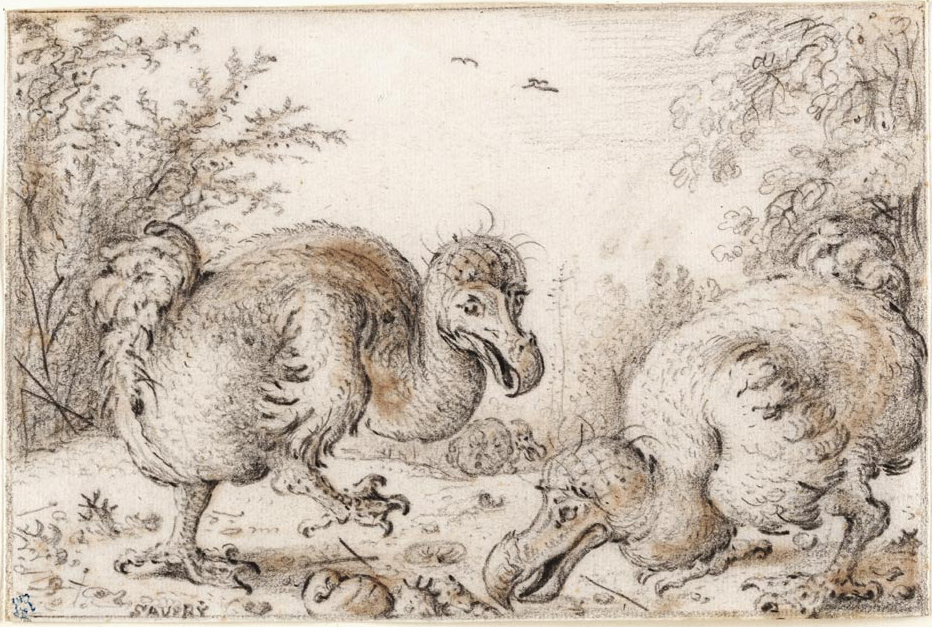
Savery sketch of three dodos from c. 1626, Crocker Art Gallery

- Collections are made in England for needy French refugees.
- Havertown and Bryn Mawr are founded in Pennsylvania by Welsh Quakers.
- The bell Emmanuel in Notre-Dame de Paris is recast.
- The Port of Honfleur, France, is re-modelled by Abraham Duquesne.
- The basilica of Santa Maria della Salute in Venice, designed by Baldassare Longhena in 1631, is dedicated.
- The dodo becomes extinct.

== Births ==
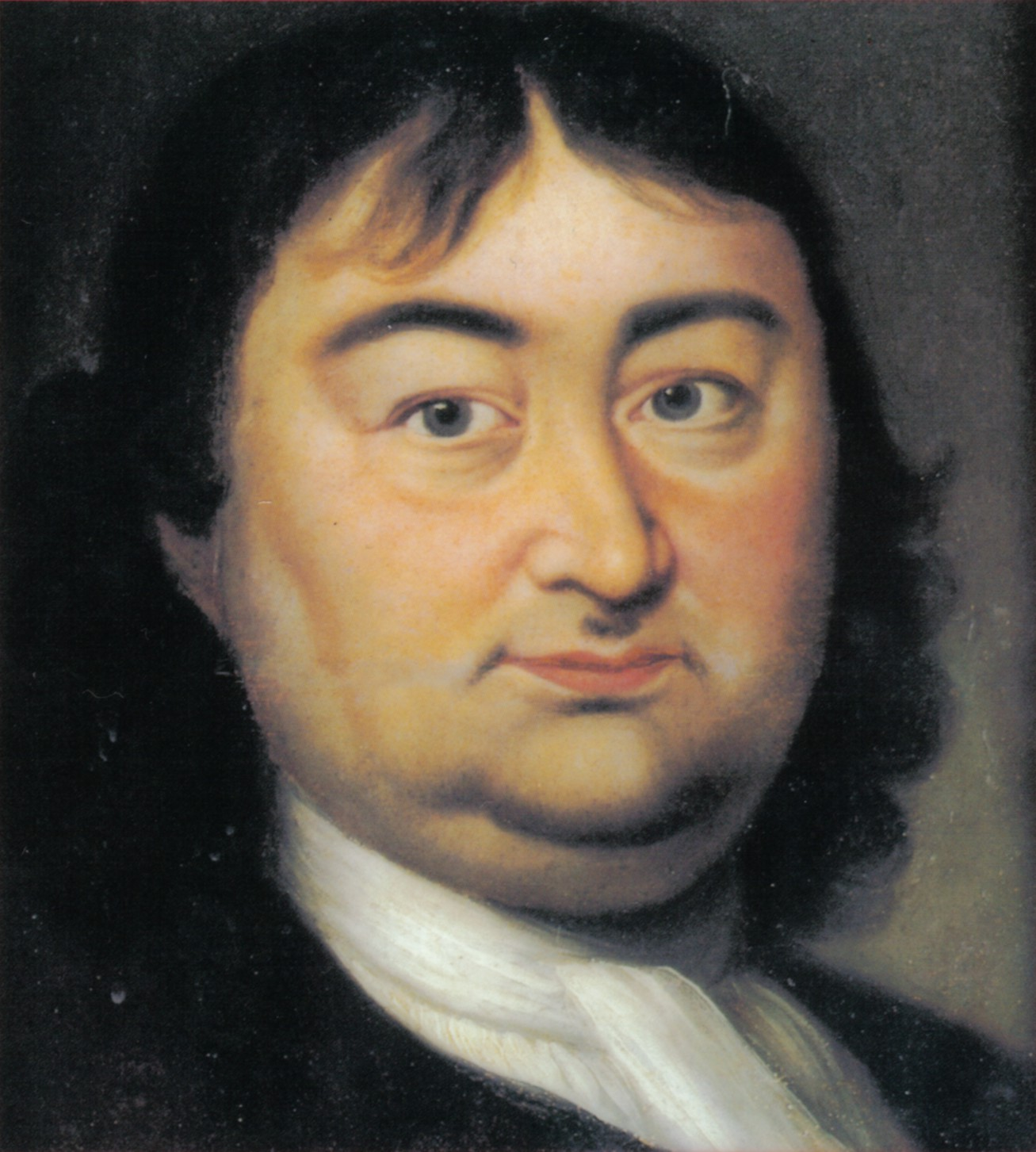
Vitus Bering

- March 24 – Georg Philipp Telemann, German composer (d. 1767)
- June 26 – Hedvig Sophia of Sweden, Swedish princess (d. 1708)
- August 5 – Vitus Bering, Danish-born Russian explorer (d. 1741)
- September 11 – Johann Gottlieb Heineccius, German jurist (d. 1741)
- September 28 – Johann Mattheson, German composer (d. 1764)
- October 1 – Giulia Lama, Italian painter (d. 1747)
- November 17 – Pierre François le Courayer, French theologian (d. 1776)
- November 28 – Jean Cavalier, French Protestant rebel leader (d. 1740)

== Deaths ==
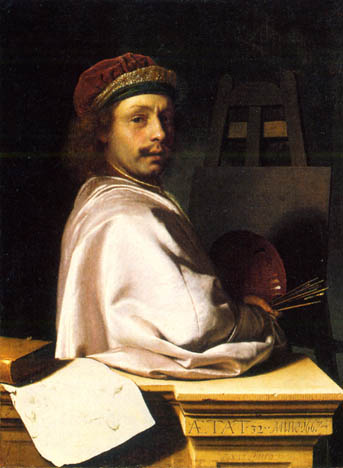
Frans van Mieris the Elder

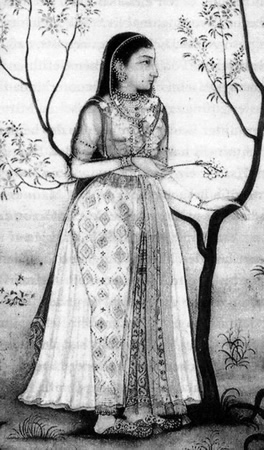
Jahanara Begum

- January 5 – Pietro Vidoni, Italian Catholic cardinal (b. 1610)
- January 7 – Magdalena Sibylla of Saxe-Weissenfels, German noblewoman (b. 1648)
- January 27 – Edmund Bowyer, English politician (b. 1613)
- January 28 – Richard Allestree, English royalist churchman (b. c. 1621)
- March 6 – Michel de Marolles, French translator and churchman (b. 1600)
- March 12 – Frans van Mieris the Elder, Dutch painter (b. 1635)
- March 17 – Zheng Jing, Chinese pirate (b. 1642)
- April 3 – Lucas Franchoys the Younger, Flemish painter (b. 1616)
- April 5 – John Cutt, New England merchant and politician (b. 1613)
- April 8 – Gabriel Druillettes, French missionary (b. 1610)
- April 10 – Philip I, Count of Schaumburg-Lippe (1640–1681) (b. 1601)
- April 11 – Frederick Louis, Count Palatine of Zweibrücken (b. 1619)
- April 12 – Pietro Paolini, Italian painter (b. 1603)
- April 22
  - Jeffrey Daniel, English politician (b. 1626)
  - Marie Fouquet, French medical writer and philanthropist (b. 1590)
- April 23 – Justus Sustermans, Flemish painter (b. 1597)
- April 26 – Charles Howard, 3rd Earl of Nottingham, son of Charles Howard (b. 1610)
- May 4 – Johannes Musaeus, German theologian (b. 1613)
- May 6 – Catherine Trianon, French fortune teller and poisoner (b. 1627)
- May 6 – Sir Philip Wodehouse, 3rd Baronet, English baronet (b. 1608)
- May 24 – Nicodemus Tessin the Elder, Swedish architect (b. 1615)
- May 25 – Pedro Calderón de la Barca, Spanish dramatist and poet (b. 1600)
- June 9 – William Lilly, English astrologer (b. 1602)
- June 12 – Sigmund von Birken, German Baroque poet (b. 1626)
- July 1 – Oliver Plunkett, Irish saint (b. 1629)
- July 8 – Georg Neumark, German poet and composer of hymns (b. 1621)
- July 10 – Christian Lupus, Flemish historian (b. 1612)
- July 20 – Louis Günther II, Count of Schwarzburg-Ebeleben (1642–1681) (b. 1621)
- July 25 – Urian Oakes, English-born president of Harvard University (b. 1631)
- July 31 – Sir Baynham Throckmorton, 3rd Baronet, English Member of Parliament (b. 1629)
- August 12 – Sir George Wharton, 1st Baronet, English baronet (b. 1617)
- August 17 – Patriarch Nikon of Moscow, Patriarch of the Russian Orthodox Church (b. 1605)
- August 18 – Thomas Allen, English politician (b. 1603)
- August 22 – Philippe Delano, Dutch Plymouth Colony settler (b. 1602)
- August 27 – William Christoph, Landgrave of Hesse-Homburg (b. 1625)
- September 11
  - Dirk van Bleiswijk, Dutch politician, writer (b. 1639)
  - Godfrey Henschen, Jesuit hagiographer (b. 1601)
- September 16 – Jahanara Begum, Mughal princess (b. 1614)
- September 27 – Jacob Masen, German poet (b. 1606)
- October 7 – Nicolaas Heinsius the Elder, Dutch scholar (b. 1620)
- October 15 – Johann Ludwig Schönleben, Carniolan priest (b. 1618)
- November 2 – Eleanor of Anhalt-Zerbst, duchess consort of Schleswig-Holstein-Sønderburg-Norburg (b. 1608)
- November 13 – Arnold Braemes, English politician (b. 1602)
- November 17 – Tito Livio Burattini, Italian inventor, Egyptologist and instrument-maker (b. 1617)
- November 23 – Hedwig of the Palatinate-Sulzbach, Archduchess of Austria, Duchess of Saxe-Lauenburg (b. 1650)
- November 26
  - Jean Garnier, French historian (b. 1612)
  - Giovanni Paolo Oliva, Italian Jesuit (b. 1600)
- December 4 – Maurice, Duke of Saxe-Zeitz (b. 1619)
- December 5 – Agatha Christine of Hanau-Lichtenberg, German noblewoman (b. 1632)
- December 8 – Gerard ter Borch, Dutch painter (b. 1617)
- December 12 – Hermann Conring, German philosopher (b. 1606)
- December 15 – James Compton, 3rd Earl of Northampton, English politician (b. 1622)
- December 16 – François Vavasseur, French writer (b. 1605)
- December 18 – Olimpia Aldobrandini, Italian Aldobrandini family member, heiress (b. 1623)
- December 21 – Lacuzon, Franche-Comté military leader (b. 1607)
- December 22 – Richard Alleine, English Puritan clergyman (b. 1611)
- c. December – John Pordage, Anglican vicar (b. 1607)
- date unknown – Fatima Soltan, sovereign queen of the Qasim Khanate
