= 1605 =

1605 in various calendars
- Gregorian calendar: 1605; MDCV
- Ab urbe condita: 2358
- Armenian calendar: 1054; ԹՎ ՌԾԴ
- Assyrian calendar: 6355
- Balinese saka calendar: 1526–1527
- Bengali calendar: 1011–1012
- Berber calendar: 2555
- English Regnal year: 2 Ja. 1 – 3 Ja. 1
- Buddhist calendar: 2149
- Burmese calendar: 967
- Byzantine calendar: 7113–7114
- Chinese calendar: 甲辰年 (Wood Dragon); 4302 or 4095 — to — 乙巳年 (Wood Snake); 4303 or 4096
- Coptic calendar: 1321–1322
- Discordian calendar: 2771
- Ethiopian calendar: 1597–1598
- Hebrew calendar: 5365–5366
- Hindu calendars
- Vikram Samvat: 1661–1662
- Shaka Samvat: 1526–1527
- Kali Yuga: 4705–4706
- Holocene calendar: 11605
- Igbo calendar: 605–606
- Iranian calendar: 983–984
- Islamic calendar: 1013–1014
- Japanese calendar: Keichō 10 (慶長１０年)
- Javanese calendar: 1525–1526
- Julian calendar: Gregorian minus 10 days
- Korean calendar: 3938
- Minguo calendar: 307 before ROC 民前307年
- Nanakshahi calendar: 137
- Thai solar calendar: 2147–2148
- Tibetan calendar: ཤིང་ཕོ་འབྲུག་ལོ་ (male Wood-Dragon); 1731 or 1350 or 578 — to — ཤིང་མོ་སྦྲུལ་ལོ་ (female Wood-Snake); 1732 or 1351 or 579

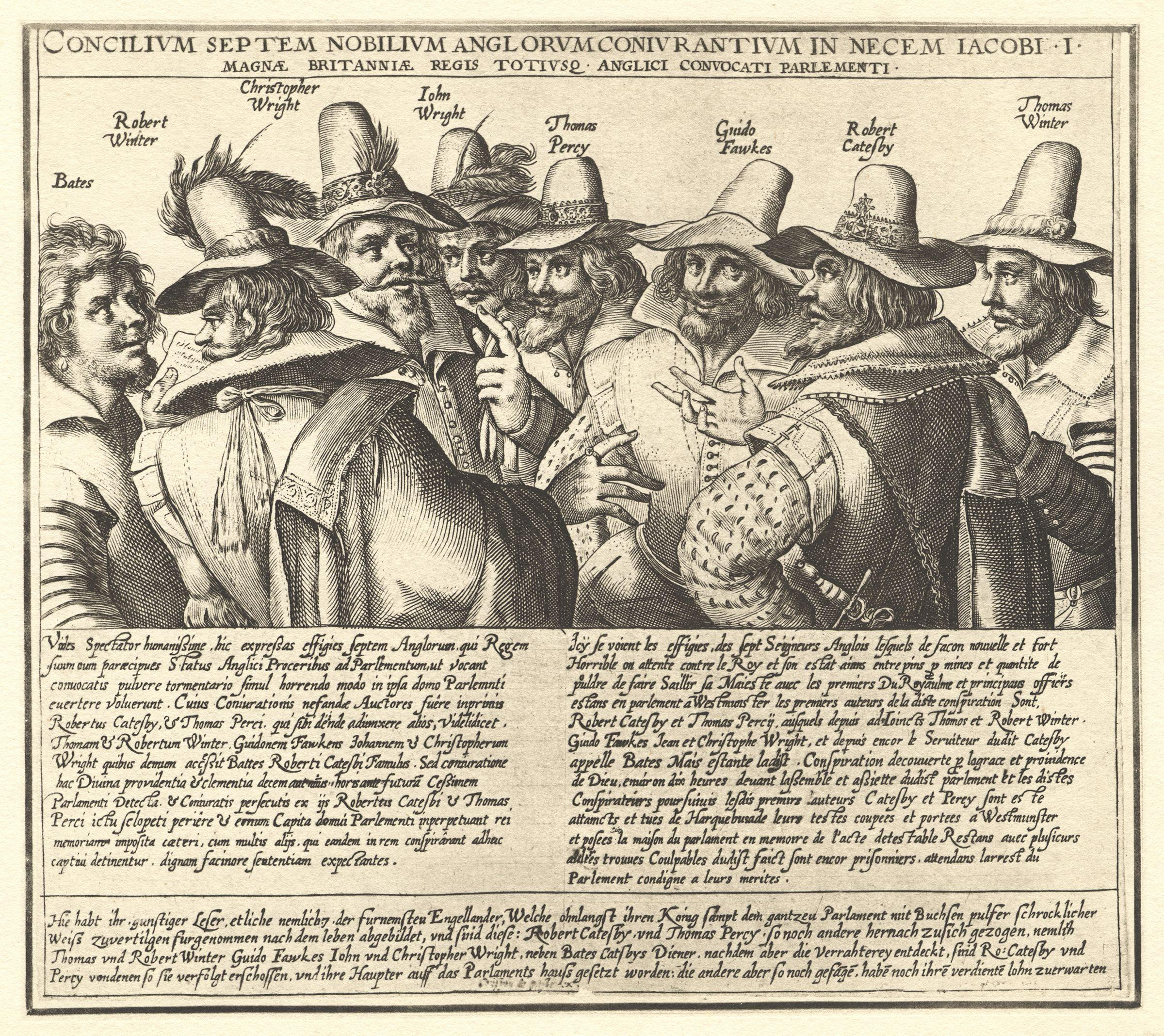
November 5: The Gunpowder Plot of Guy Fawkes to bomb Parliament is foiled

1605 (MDCV) was a common year starting on Saturday of the Gregorian calendar and a common year starting on Tuesday of the Julian calendar, the 1605th year of the Common Era (CE) and Anno Domini (AD) designations, the 605th year of the 2nd millennium, the 5th year of the 17th century, and the 6th year of the 1600s decade. As of the start of 1605, the Gregorian calendar was 10 days ahead of the Julian calendar, which remained in localized use until 1923.

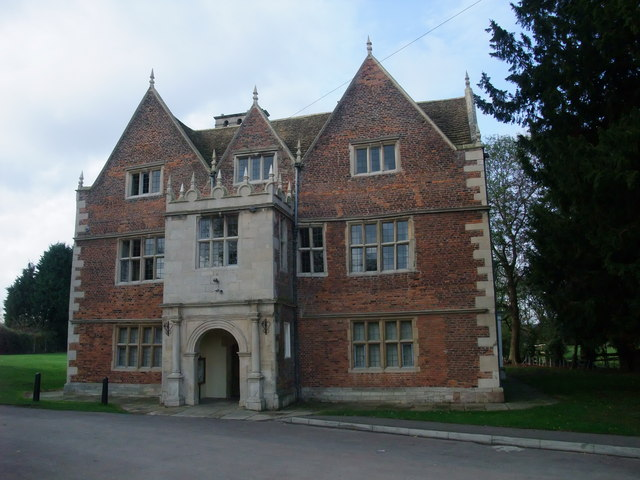
The Red Hall, Bourne, England, dating from 1605

== Events ==
=== January–March ===
- January 1 – William Shakespeare's play A Midsummer Night's Dream, copyrighted 1600, is given its earliest recorded performance, and witnessed by the Viscount Dorchester.
- January 7 – Shakespeare's play Henry V, copyrighted 1600, is given its earliest recorded performance, presented by the Lord Chamberlain's Men for King James I of England.
- January 15 – Shakespeare's play Love's Labour's Lost, copyrighted 1598, is given its second recorded performance, probably presented at the home of the Earl of Southampton for Queen Anne, wife of King James I of England.
- January 16 – The first part of Miguel de Cervantes' satire on the theme of chivalry, Don Quixote (El ingenioso hidalgo don Quixote de la Mancha, "The Ingenious Hidalgo Don Quixote of La Mancha"), is published in Madrid. One of the first significant novels in the western literary tradition, it becomes a global bestseller almost at once.
- February 3 – The 1605 Keichō earthquake, of estimated 7.9 magnitude, strikes Japan south of the island of Honshu, and triggers a tsunami that washes away hundreds of houses and kills thousands of people.
- February 10 – Shakespeare's play The Merchant of Venice is given its earliest recorded performance, presented by the King's Men players at the Palace of Whitehall for King James I of England. A second performance is given on February 12, Shrove Tuesday, at the King's request.
- February 21 – Stephen Bocskai is elected Prince of Transylvania at the capital, Belugrad (modern-day Alba Iulia in Romania.)
- February 25 – Admiral Steven van der Hagen leads a fleet of ships for the Dutch East India Company and makes the first capture of land for the Netherlands in what will become the Dutch East Indies, and later Indonesia. Hagen's men capture the Portuguese citadel of Forte Amboino and the rest of Ambon Island, and make it the capital of the Dutch possessions in Asia.
- March 11 – A proclamation declares all people of Ireland to be the direct subjects of the British Crown and not of any local lord or chief.
- March 3 – Pope Clement VIII dies at the age of 69 after a reign of 13 years.
- March 14 – The March–April 1605 papal conclave of Roman Catholic cardinals to elect a successor to Pope Clement VIII opens at the Vatican in Rome, 11 days after Clement's death. Sixty-one of the 69 cardinals meet behind closed doors for the rest of the month. Discussion becomes heated, with shouting and jostling.

=== April–June ===
- April 1 – Cardinal Alessandro Ottaviano de' Medici, the Bishop of Pistoia, is elected by the assembled 61 cardinals at the papal conclave after 17 days of balloting. He takes the regnal name of Pope Leo XI to become the 232nd pope, but serves for less than four weeks.
- April 8 – The city of Oulu (Swedish: Uleåborg) is founded by King Charles IX of Sweden.
- April 13 – Tsar Boris Godunov dies; Feodor II accedes to the Russian throne.
- April 16
  - Tokugawa Ieyasu abdicates as shogun of Japan, becoming Ogosho (retired shogun). His son Tokugawa Hidetada succeeds him to the office.
  - In England, John Winthrop, later governor of the future Massachusetts Bay Colony, marries his first wife (of 4), Mary Forth, daughter of John Forth, of Great Stambridge, Essex.
- April 27 – Pope Leo XI dies suddenly from a cold at the age of 69, after a reign of only 26 days, prompting the return of the cardinals for the second papal conclave in less than two months. During his brief reign, the Pope issued a bill requiring secret balloting in papal conclaves.
- May 8 – A group of 59 Roman Catholic cardinals assemble at Rome for another papal conclave to elect a successor to Pope Leo XI. During the meeting, a fistfight breaks out among the cardinals over the two rival candidates, Antonio Sauli and Domenico Toschi, neither of whom receive the necessary 40 votes for a two-thirds election. In the fight, Cardinal Alfonso Visconti sustains several fractures.
- May 16 – Camillo Borghese, Cardinal Vicar of Rome and cardinal-priest of Sant'Eusebio is elected the 233rd pope, and takes the name of Pope Paul V. Another "Year of Three Popes" will not occur until 373 years later, in 1978. Borghese is elected as a compromise candidate after the physical disagreements during the conclave.
- June 1 – Russian troops in Moscow imprison Feodor II and his mother, later executing them.
- June 20 – Pretender Dmitriy and his supporters, including troops of the Polish–Lithuanian Commonwealth, march to Moscow.

=== July–September ===
- July 4 – A proclamation commands all Roman Catholic seminary priests and Jesuits to leave Ireland by December 10 and directs the laity to attend Church of Ireland services.
- July 13 – The 1605 Guangdong earthquake, of 7.5 magnitude, strikes China's Hainan Province causing widespread damage and thousands of deaths.
- July 21 – Claiming to be Dmitriy, son of Ivan the Terrible, a pretender is officially crowned Tsar Dimitriy Ioannovich of Russia in Moscow by Patriarch Ignatius.
- August 14 – A Spanish attack on the Moorish fortress of Hammamet, in Ottoman Tunisia, ends in a disaster for the Spaniards. Although Spanish troops had managed to scale the walls and open the gates, they are suddenly ordered to retreat and are massacred while waiting on the coast for the return of the ships that brought them.
- August 19 – Eighty Years' War: The siege of the Dutch city of Lingen, by 13,000 Spanish troops and 3,000 cavalry, ends with the surrender of Captain Maerten Cobben after nine days of defense. Although the Dutch Republic's stadtholder, Maurice, Prince of Orange, had proclaimed that Lingen must be held at all costs, Dutch troops failed to come to Cobben's aid and Don Ambrogio Spinola of Spain peacefully takes control of the city.
- September 27 – Swedish armies are decisively defeated by Polish–Lithuanian Commonwealth cavalry in the Battle of Kircholm.

=== October–December ===
- October 27 – The 3rd Mughal Emperor, Akbar "the Great", dies of dysentery at Fatehpur Sikri in India.
- October 28 – Eighty Years' War: Spanish troops under Ambrogio Spinola, 1st Marquess of Los Balbases, Captain-General of the Army of Flanders (newly appointed a Knight of the Order of the Golden Fleece), occupy Wachtendonk after a 20-day siege.
- October
  - The first issue of Relation aller Fürnemmen und gedenckwürdigen Historien by Johann Carolus in Strasbourg (Holy Roman Empire), generally regarded as the world's first newspaper, is published. De Nieuwe Tijdinghen, a Dutch proto-newspaper, is also published this year.
  - Francis Bacon's Of the Proficience and Advancement of Learning, Divine and Human is published in London.
- November 3 – Jahangir, the fourth Mughal Emperor, begins his 22-year reign over the Mughal Empire in northern India.
- November 5 (O.S.) – The Gunpowder Plot, a scheme to bomb England's Palace of Westminster during the opening of Parliament, is foiled after Sir Thomas Knyvet is tipped off, and finds Catholic plotter Guy Fawkes in a cellar below the Parliament building. Knyvet orders a search of the area and 36 barrels of gunpowder are found. Fawkes is arrested for trying to assassinate King James I and the members who had been scheduled to sit together in Parliament the next day.
- November 6 – The Iranian Safavid ruler Abbas the Great leads the Persian troops to a victory over a larger force of Ottoman Empire troops in the Battle of Sufiyan, and captures Tabriz.
- December 6 – In England, Thomas Bonham petitions to become a member of the College of Physicians in order for his practice to be legal, and is rejected. Dr. Bonham continues to practice, and is eventually imprisoned on November 13, 1606, leading to the landmark decision in Dr. Bonham's Case in 1610.
- December 11 – King Sigismund III of Poland marries his former sister-in-law, Constance, daughter of Charles II, Archduke of Austria, after Rudolf II, Holy Roman Emperor refuses to permit the King to marry Anna of Tyrol. King Sigismund, a widow, had previously been married to Constance's older sister, Anne.
- December 21 – On behalf of Spain, Portuguese navigator Pedro Fernandes de Queirós begins his expedition to the South Pacific Ocean with 160 men on three ships. Queiros departs from Callao in the Viceroyalty of Peru with his flagship, San Pedro y San Pablo, and San Pedro and Los Tres Reyes.

=== Date unknown ===
- Habitation at Port-Royal established by France under Pierre Dugua, Sieur de Mons, the first European colonization of Nova Scotia in North America (at this time part of Acadia); the Gregorian calendar is adopted.
- Crew of the Olive become the first English visitors to Barbados.
- Refugee French Huguenot merchants begin to settle in Dublin and Waterford.
- The Priory of St. Gregory's is founded at Douai, Flanders, at this time in the Spanish Netherlands, by its first prior, John Roberts, and other exiles, thus becoming the first English Benedictine house to renew conventual life after the English Reformation. More than two centuries later the community will establish Downside Abbey back in England.
- The Irish College in Paris is co-founded by John Lee, an Irish priest, and John de l'Escalopier, President of the Parlement.
- Central Mexico's Amerindian population reaches one million.

== Births ==
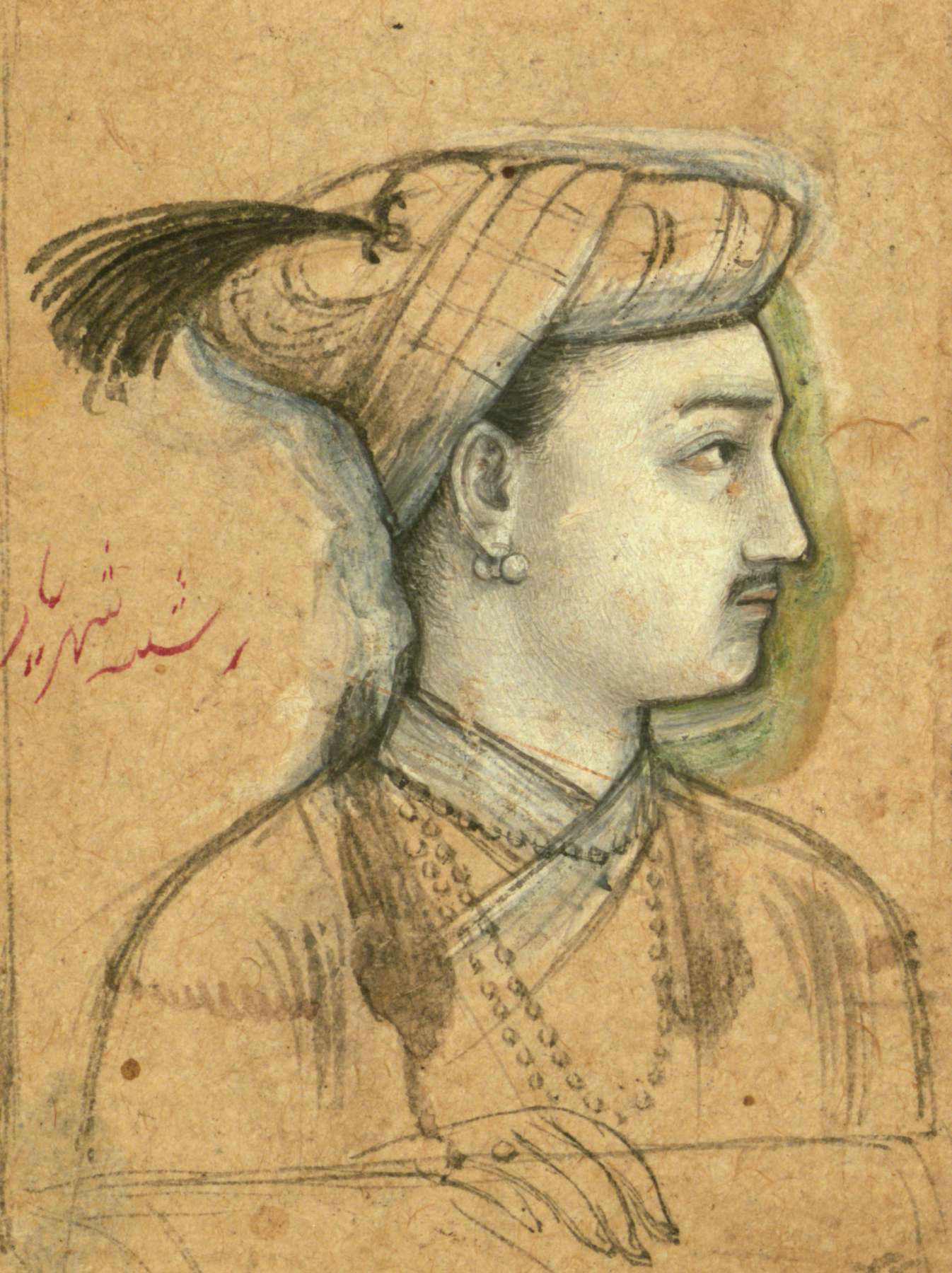
Shahryar

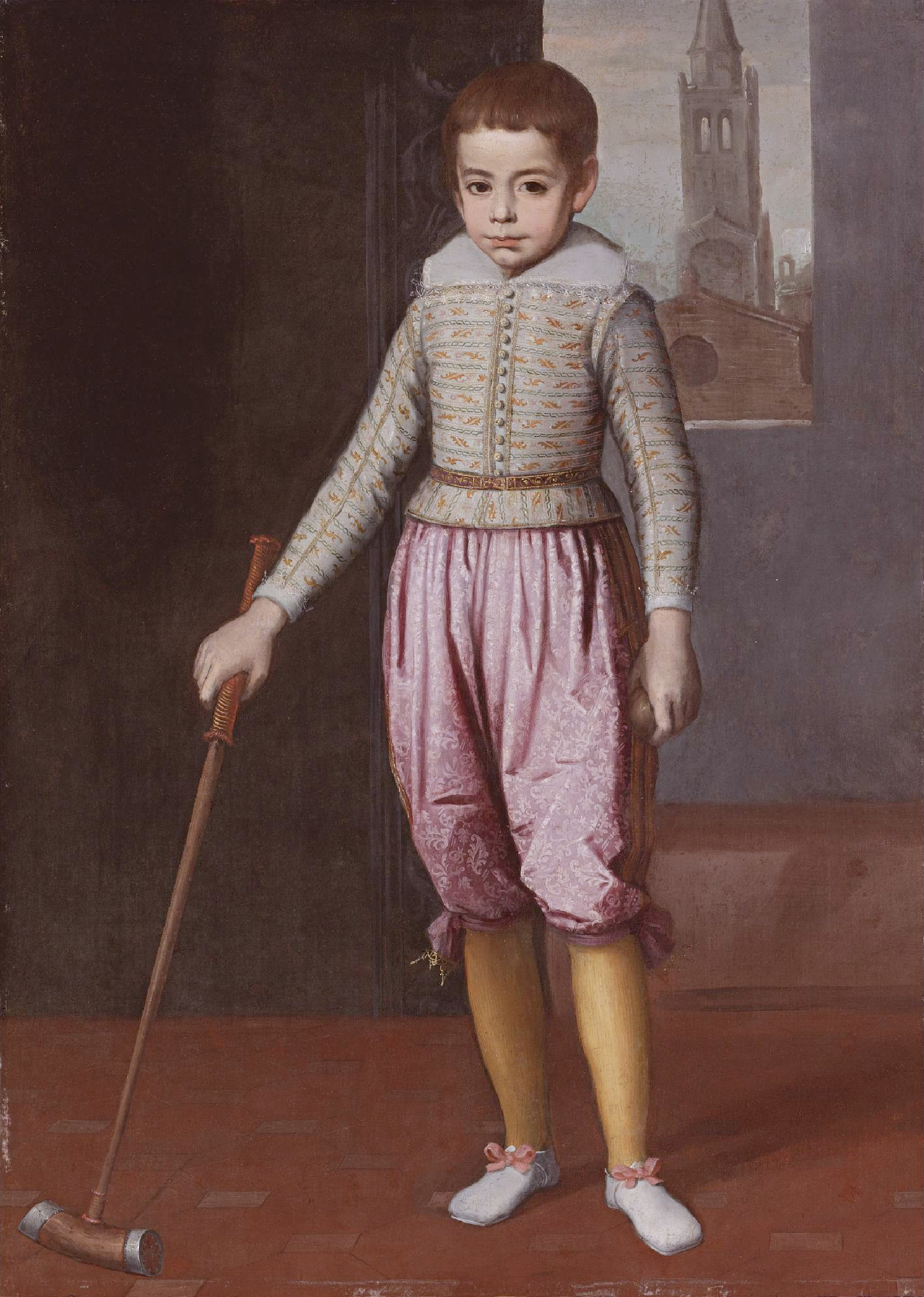
Federico Ubaldo della Rovere, Duke of Urbino

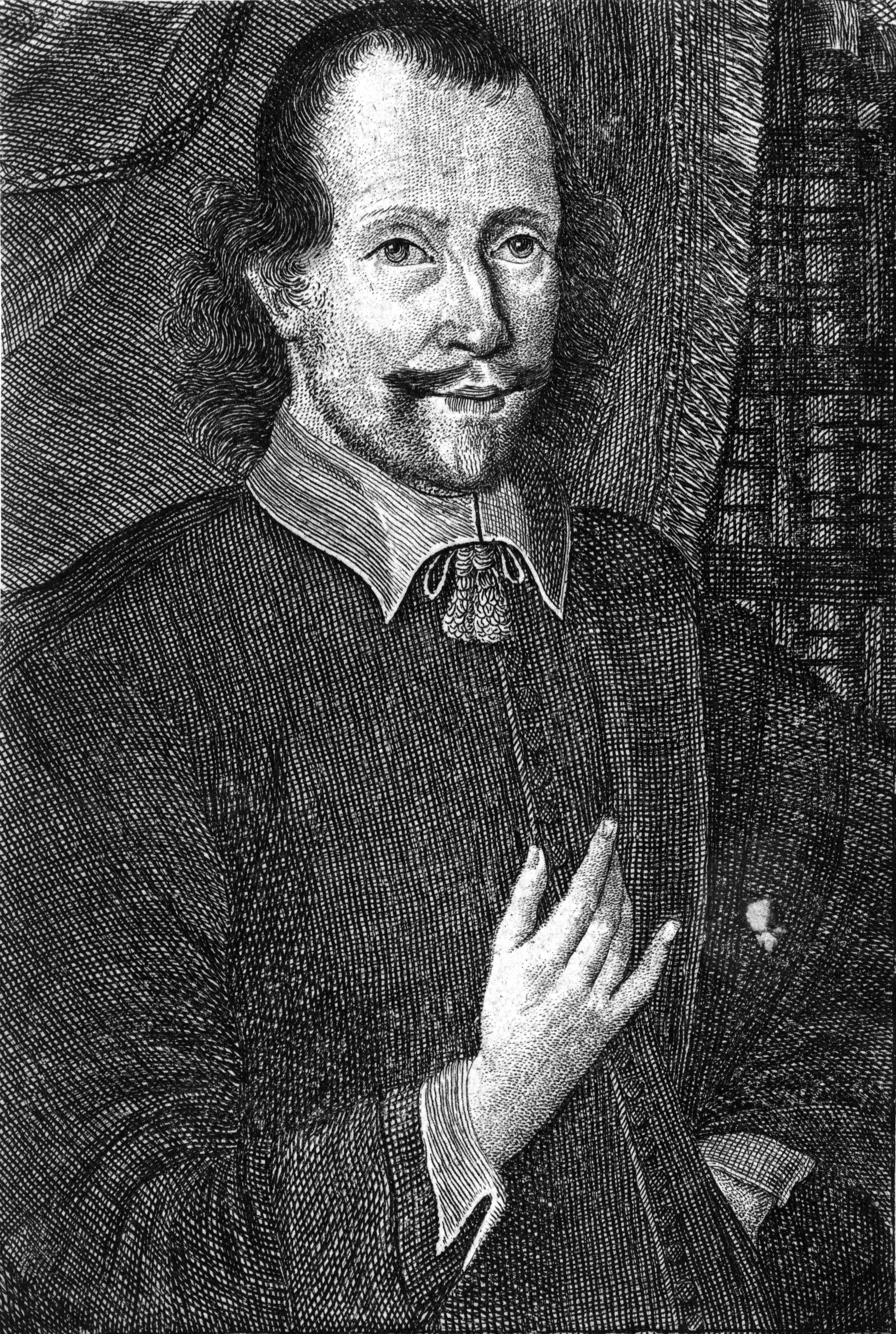
Simon Dach

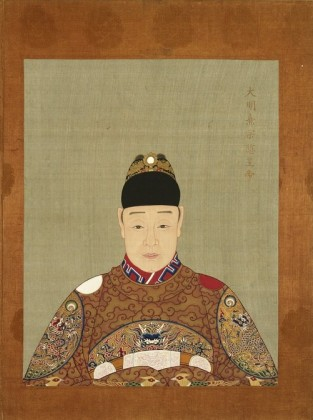
Tianqi Emperor

=== January–March ===
- January 16 – Shahryar, fifth and youngest son of the Mughal Emperor Jahangir (d. 1628)
- January 17 – Anthony Irby, English politician (d. 1682)
- February 1 – Isaac Aboab da Fonseca, Portuguese Sephardic rabbi (d. 1693)
- February 17 – Luca Ferrari, Italian painter (d. 1654)
- February 18
  - Juan de Almoguera, Roman Catholic prelate who served as Archbishop of Lima (1673–1676) and Bishop of Arequipa (1659–1673) (d. 1676)
  - Abraham Ecchellensis, Lebanese Maronite philosopher (d. 1664)
- February 20 – Sir John Lowther, 1st Baronet, of Lowther, English politician (d. 1675)
- March 1 – James Wriothesley, Lord Wriothesley, English politician (d. 1624)
- March 2 – René Menard, Canadian explorer (d. 1661)
- March 3 – George Horner, English politician (d. 1677)
- March 14 – Francis Davies, Welsh bishop (d. 1675)
- March 17 – George II, Landgrave of Hesse-Darmstadt (1626–1661) (d. 1661)

=== April–June ===
- April 8
  - King Philip IV of Spain (d. 1665)
  - Mary Stuart, English-Scottish princess (d. 1607)
- April 18 – Giacomo Carissimi, Italian composer (d. 1674)
- April 19 – Orazio Benevoli, Italian composer (d. 1672)
- April 30 – Peder Winstrup, Bishop of Lund (d. 1679)
- May 7 – Patriarch Nikon of Moscow, Patriarch of the Russian Orthodox Church (d. 1681)
- May 16 – Federico Ubaldo della Rovere, Duke of Urbino, Italian noble (d. 1623)
- May 29 – Hendrick van Anthonissen, Dutch painter (d. 1656)
- June 6 – Peregrine Palmer, English politician (d. 1684)
- June 15 – Thomas Randolph, English poet and dramatist (d. 1635)
- June 22 – Andrea Bolgi, Italian sculptor (d. 1656)

=== July–September ===
- July 6 – Ulrich II, Count of East Frisia, ruler of East Frisia in the later years of the Thirty Years' War (d. 1648)
- July 25 – Theodore Haak, German scholar (d. 1690)
- July 29 – Simon Dach, Prussian German lyrical poet and writer of hymns (d. 1659)
- August 6
  - Johann Philipp von Schönborn, Archbishop-Elector of Mainz (1647– (d. 1673)
  - Bulstrode Whitelocke, English lawyer (d. 1675)
- August 8 – Cecil Calvert, 2nd Baron Baltimore, first Proprietor and Proprietary Governor of the Province of Maryland (d. 1675)
- August 18 – Henry Hammond, English churchman (d. 1660)
- August 25 – Philipp Moritz, Count of Hanau-Münzenberg, German noble (d. 1638)
- August 30 – Felice Ficherelli, Italian painter (d. 1660)
- August 31 – Nicolas Talon, French Jesuit (d. 1691)
- September 1 – Michele Mazzarino, Italian Catholic cardinal (d. 1648)
- September 8 – Cornelis Jan Witsen, Mayor of Amsterdam (d. 1669)
- September 12 – William Dugdale, English antiquary and herald (d. 1686)
- September 14 – Brynjólfur Sveinsson, Icelandic bishop and scholar (d. 1675)
- September 17 – Francesco Sacrati, Italian composer (d. 1650)
- September 24 – Antoine Godeau, French bishop and poet (d. 1672)
- September 28 – Ismaël Bullialdus, French astronomer (d. 1694)

=== October–December ===
- October 15 – Marie de Bourbon, Duchess of Montpensier, French princess (d. 1627)
- October 16 – Charles Coypeau d'Assoucy, French writer and composer (d. 1677)
- October 19 – Sir Thomas Browne, English physician and philosopher (d. 1682)
- October 22 – Frédéric Maurice de La Tour d'Auvergne, prince of the independent principality of Sedan (d. 1652)
- November 3 – John Henderson, 5th of Fordell, Scottish noble (d. 1650)
- November 4 – William Habington, English poet (d. 1654)
- November 5 – Thomas Shepard, American Puritan minister and a significant figure in early colonial New England (d. 1649)
- December 1 – Roger Hill, English politician (d. 1667)
- December 8 – François Vavasseur, French writer (d. 1681)
- December 16 – Jerome Weston, 2nd Earl of Portland, English diplomat and landowner (d. 1663)
- December 23 – Tianqi Emperor, Ming emperor of China (d. 1627)
- December 25 – Francis Godolphin, English politician (d. 1667)

=== Date unknown ===
- William Berkeley, English governor of Virginia (d. 1677)
- Adriaen Brouwer, Flemish painter (d. 1638)
- Aleksander Dominik Kazanowski, Polish nobleman (d. 1648)
- Alexandra Mavrokordatou, Greek intellectual and salonist (d. 1684)
- Afanasy Ordin-Nashchokin, Russian statesman (d. 1680)
- Jean-Baptiste Tavernier, French traveller and pioneer of trade with India (d. 1689)
- Constantia Zierenberg, German-Polish singer (d. 1653)
- Thomas Hastings, American politician (d. 1685)
- Johann Rudolf Stadler, Swiss clock-maker (d. 16 October 1637)
- Ayşe Sultan and/or Gevherhan Sultan, Ottoman princesses, daughters of Ahmed I

=== Approximate date ===
- Semyon Dezhnev, Pomor navigator (d. 1672)
- John Gauden, English bishop and writer (d. 1662)
- William Goffe, English parliamentarian and regicide (d. 1679)
- Thomas Nabbes, English dramatist (d. c. 1645)
- Francis Willoughby, 5th Baron Willoughby of Parham, English noble (d. 1666)

== Deaths ==
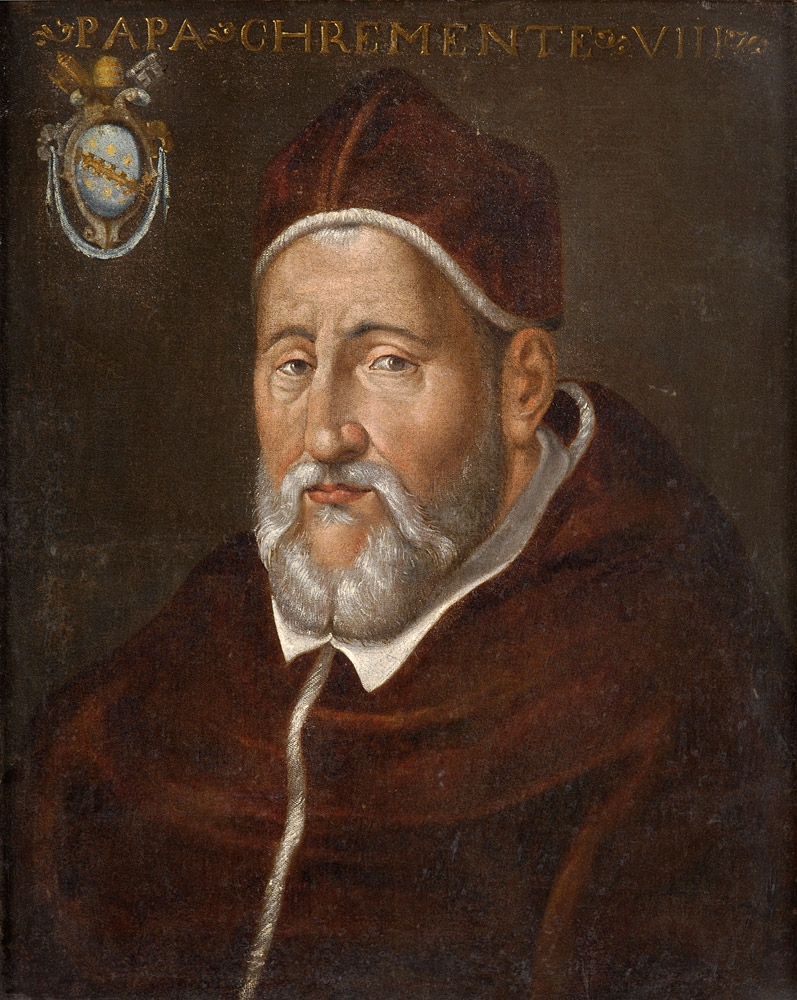
Pope Clement VIII

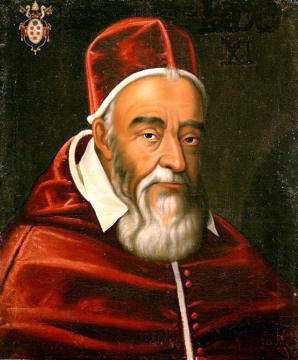
Pope Leo XI

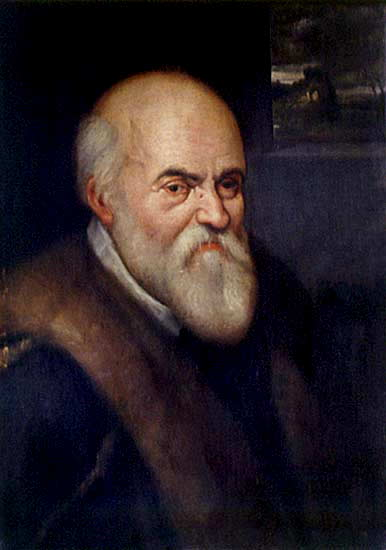
Ulisse Aldrovandi

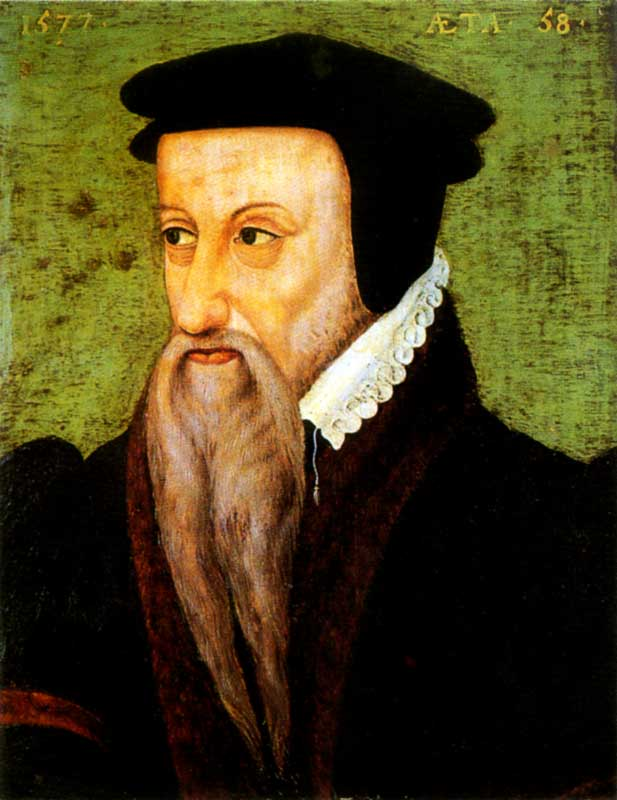
Theodore Beza

=== January–March ===
- January 16 – Eitel Friedrich IV, Count of Hohenzollern (b. 1545)
- February 5 – Edward Stafford, English diplomat (b. 1552)
- February 15 – Maria of Hanau-Münzenberg, German noblewoman (b. 1562)
- February 19 – Orazio Vecchi, Italian composer (b. 1550)
- February 24 – Girolamo Simoncelli, Italian Catholic cardinal (b. 1522)
- February 26 – George III, Count of Erbach-Breuberg (1564–1605) (b. 1548)
- March 5 – Pope Clement VIII (b. 1536)
- March 12 – King Alexander II of Kakheti (b. 1527)
- March 17 – Pieter Bast, Dutch cartographer, engraver and draftsman (b. 1550)

=== April–June ===
- April 5 – Adam Loftus, English Catholic archbishop (b. c. 1533)
- April 6 – John Stow, English historian and antiquarian (b. 1525)
- April 10 – Albrecht VII, Count of Schwarzburg-Rudolstadt (b. 1537)
- April 13 – Boris Godunov, Tsar of Russia (b. 1551)
- April 14 – Francis Cherry, English diplomat (b. 1552)
- April 25 – Naresuan, Siamese King of Ayutthaya kingdom (b. c. 1555)
- April 27 – Pope Leo XI (b. 1535)
- May 4 – Ulisse Aldrovandi, Italian naturalist (b. 1522)
- May 10 – Casimir VI, Duke of Pomerania, Lutheran Administrator of Cammin Prince-Bishopric (b. 1557)
- June 3 – Jan Zamoyski, Polish nobleman (b. 1542)
- June 9 – John Louis II, Count of Nassau-Wiesbaden-Idstein (1596–1605) (b. 1596)
- June 20 – Tsar Feodor II of Russia (b. 1589)

=== July–September ===
- July 2 – Louis I, Count of Sayn-Wittgenstein (1588–1605) (b. 1532)
- July 18 – Johann II, Duke of Saxe-Weimar, German duke (b. 1570)
- July 26 – Rev. Fr. Miguel de Benavides, O.P., Spanish clergyman and sinologist (b. 1552)
- August 2 – Richard Leveson, English admiral (b. c. 1570)
- August 4 – Charles I, Duke of Elbeuf, French duke and nobleman (b. 1556)
- September 9 – Heinrich Khunrath, German physician (b. 1560)
- September 11 – Sir Thomas Tresham, English politician (b. 1550)
- September 14 – Jan Tarnowski, Archbishop of Kraków (b. 1550)
- September 19 – Edward Lewknor, English politician (b. 1542)
- September 23 – Pontus de Tyard, French poet (b. c. 1521)
- September 24 – Manuel Mendes, Portuguese composer (b. 1547)

=== October–December ===
- October 13 – Theodore Beza, French theologian (b. 1519)
- October 18 – Beate Clausdatter Bille, Danish noblewoman (b. 1526)
- October 22 – King Constantine I of Kakheti (b. 1567)
- October 27 – Akbar The Great, Mughal emperor (b. 1542)
- October 30 – George Clifford, 3rd Earl of Cumberland, English noble (b. 1558)
- October 31 – Dorothy Bray, Baroness Chandos, English noble (b. 1524)
- November 5 – Nyaungyan Min, Burmese king (b. 1555)
- November 8 – Robert Catesby, English conspirator (b. 1573)
- November 9 – Handan Sultan, Valide Sultan, mother of Ahmed I of Ottoman Empire (b.1568)
- November 12 – Jan Tomasz Drohojowski, Polish noble (b. 1535)
- November 14 – Anna Maria of Anhalt, German noblewoman (b. 1561)
- December – Francis Tresham, English conspirator (b. 1567)
- December 3 – Guy XX de Laval, French noble (b. 1585)
- December 6 – Murai Nagayori, Japanese samurai (b. 1543)
- December 25 – Marino Grimani, Doge of Venice (b. 1532)
- December 29 – John Davis, English explorer (b. 1550)

=== Date unknown ===
- Marek Sobieski, Polish nobleman (b. 1549)
