= 1612 =

1612 in various calendars
- Gregorian calendar: 1612; MDCXII
- Ab urbe condita: 2365
- Armenian calendar: 1061; ԹՎ ՌԿԱ
- Assyrian calendar: 6362
- Balinese saka calendar: 1533–1534
- Bengali calendar: 1018–1019
- Berber calendar: 2562
- English Regnal year: 9 Ja. 1 – 10 Ja. 1
- Buddhist calendar: 2156
- Burmese calendar: 974
- Byzantine calendar: 7120–7121
- Chinese calendar: 辛亥年 (Metal Pig); 4309 or 4102 — to — 壬子年 (Water Rat); 4310 or 4103
- Coptic calendar: 1328–1329
- Discordian calendar: 2778
- Ethiopian calendar: 1604–1605
- Hebrew calendar: 5372–5373
- Hindu calendars
- Vikram Samvat: 1668–1669
- Shaka Samvat: 1533–1534
- Kali Yuga: 4712–4713
- Holocene calendar: 11612
- Igbo calendar: 612–613
- Iranian calendar: 990–991
- Islamic calendar: 1020–1021
- Japanese calendar: Keichō 17 (慶長１７年)
- Javanese calendar: 1532–1533
- Julian calendar: Gregorian minus 10 days
- Korean calendar: 3945
- Minguo calendar: 300 before ROC 民前300年
- Nanakshahi calendar: 144
- Thai solar calendar: 2154–2155
- Tibetan calendar: ལྕགས་མོ་ཕག་ལོ་ (female Iron-Boar); 1738 or 1357 or 585 — to — ཆུ་ཕོ་བྱི་བ་ལོ་ (male Water-Rat); 1739 or 1358 or 586

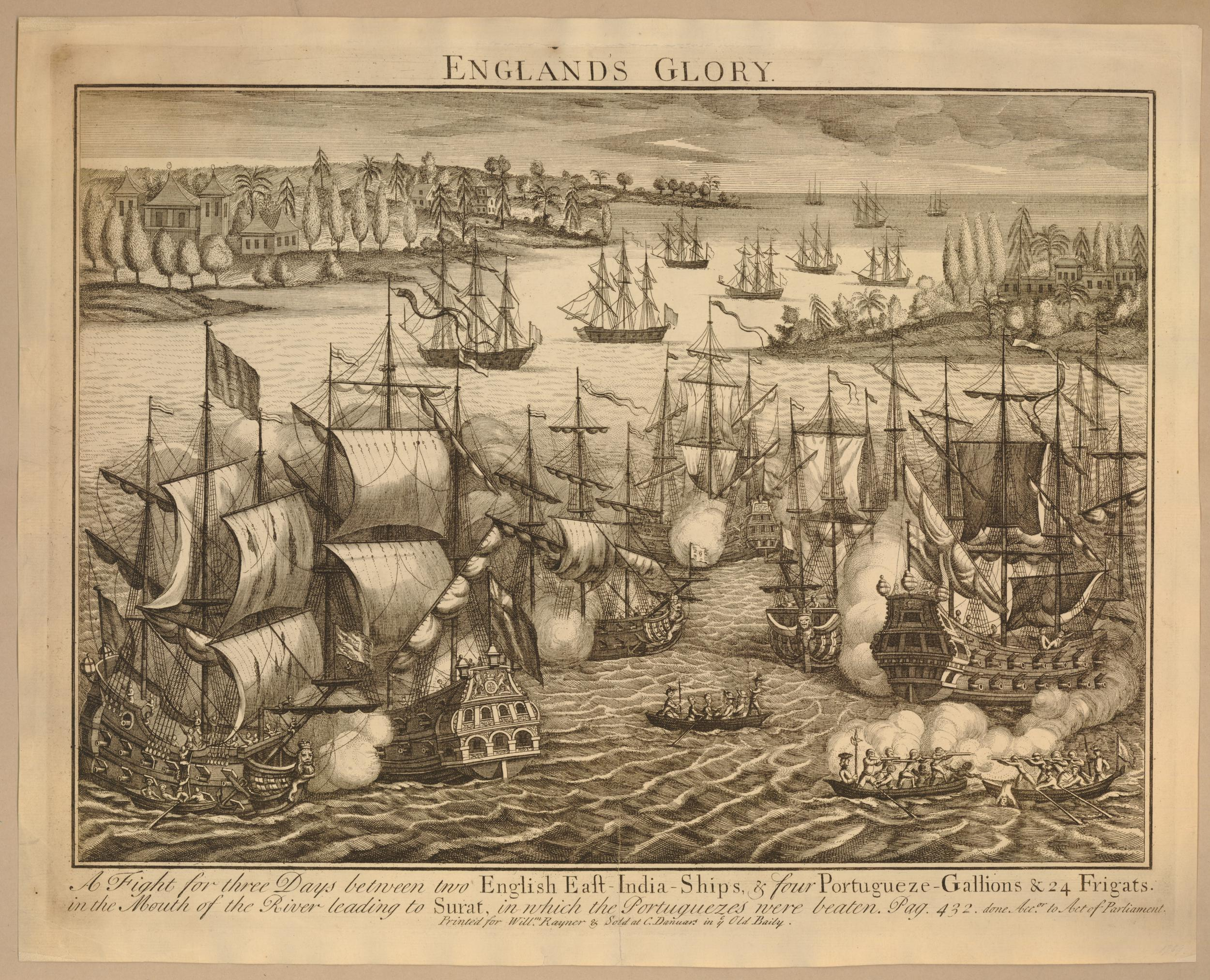
November 30: Battle of Swally

1612 (MDCXII) was a leap year starting on Sunday of the Gregorian calendar and a leap year starting on Wednesday of the Julian calendar, the 1612th year of the Common Era (CE) and Anno Domini (AD) designations, the 612th year of the 2nd millennium, the 12th year of the 17th century, and the 3rd year of the 1610s decade. As of the start of 1612, the Gregorian calendar was 10 days ahead of the Julian calendar, which remained in localized use until 1923.

== Events ==
=== January–March ===
- January 6 – Axel Oxenstierna becomes Lord High Chancellor of Sweden. He persuades the Riksdag of the Estates to grant the Swedish nobility the right and privilege to hold all higher offices of government.
- January 10 – Gustavus Adolphus replies to Metropolitan Isidor, Odoevskij and the estates of Novgorod, stating that he himself wishes to assume responsibility for the government of Novgorod and also of all Russians. A number of land grants signed the same day show that the Swedish king has assumed the title of Tsar.
- January 20
  - Rudolf II, Holy Roman Emperor, dies and several candidates vie to succeed him, with Archduke Matthias eventually being elected.
  - An uprising led by Dmitry Pozharsky begins in Moscow against occupying Polish troops.
- February 11 – Battle of Vittsjö: King Gustavus Adolphus of Sweden and 3,000 of his troops are forced to retreat from Denmark. The 17-year old king almost drowns while attempting to ride his horse across a frozen lake, but is rescued by two other members of his cavalry. The horse is lost.
- March 2 – The False Dmitry III, one of three pretenders to the Russian throne who all claim to be sons of Ivan the Terrible, is recognized as Tsar of Russia by the Cossacks.
- March 12 – At Daulambapur, near Kamalganj in what is now the Sylhet Division in Bangladesh, a battle takes place between 4,500 troops led by General Islam Khan I of India's Mughal Empire, and 12,000 defenders led by the Afghan warlord Khwaja Usman. The Mughals are almost defeated until Usman is struck in the eye by an arrow fired from a crossbow.

=== April–June ===
- April 10 – In England, 12 persons who become known as the Pendle witches allegedly hold a coven at the Malkin Tower in Lancashire on Good Friday, after which 10 people die mysteriously. All but two of the accused witches are tried for causing harm by witchcraft on August 18.
- April 11 – In Lichfield, Edward Wightman, a radical Anabaptist, becomes the last person to be burned at the stake in England as punishment for heresy.
- May 10 – Prince Khurram, the 20-year-old son of the Mughal Emperor Jahangir, marries 19-year-old Arjumand Banu Begum at a ceremony in Delhi. In 1628, Khurram becomes the Emperor Shah Jahan with Arjumand Begum as his chief consort Mumtaz Mahal. Arjumand dies in 1631 and Khurram later commissions and builds the Taj Mahal in her memory.
- May 25 – A Sicilian–Spanish galley fleet defeats the Tunisians at La Goulette after a battle.
- June 13 – Archduke Matthias of Austria is formally elected as the new Holy Roman Emperor.
- June 26 – The coronation of Matthias as Holy Roman Emperor takes place at the Frankfurt Cathedral.

=== July–September ===
- July 4 – (8th waxing of Waso 974 ME) In what is now Myanmar, Min Khamaung becomes the new King of Arakan upon the death of his father, King Min Razagyi.
- July 22 – Four women and one man are hanged following the Northamptonshire witch trials in England.
- July 24 – Marcantonio Memmo is elected as the Doge of the Republic of Venice on the first ballot of the Venetian council, winning 38 of the 41 votes. Memmo succeeds the late Doge Leonardo Donato, who died on July 16.
- August 20 – Ten Pendle witches are hanged, having been found guilty of practising witchcraft in Lancashire in England.
- August 26 – Battle of Kringen: A Scottish mercenary force is destroyed in Norway.
- September 1 – Battle of Moscow (1612): Led by General Jan Karol Chodkiewicz, a relief force from the Polish-Lithuanian Commonwealth, whose troops had been occupying Moscow for two years, make an unsuccessful attempt to break the Russian siege of the Kremlin, where General Mikolaj Strus and his troops are trapped. Both the Russians (led by Dmitry Pozharsky) and the Commonwealth troops suffer at least 1,000 deaths, but the Russians prevail. General Chodkiewicz tries a second attack the next day and fails.
- September 2 (August 23 O.S.) – The Lutheran Duchy of Prussia, a fiefdom within Poland, becomes the first Protestant government to follow the Roman Catholic nations in adopting the Gregorian calendar.
- September 5 – England's East India Company gets its first warships and establishes the "'Honourable East India Company's Marine'" to protect its freighters. The force develops over the centuries into the Royal Indian Navy and, after India's independence in 1947, the Indian Navy.
- September 22 – Retreating Polish and Lithuanian troops burn the Russian city of Vologda in reprisal for their defeat at Moscow.

=== October–December ===
- October 27 – Forces of the Polish-Lithuanian Commonwealth, which had been occupying Moscow for more than two years, surrender unconditionally to Russian militia forces and are allowed to leave after the Kremlin is liberated by Prince Dmitry Pozharsky and Prince Kuzma Minin.
- November 20 – The Treaty of Nasuh Pasha is signed, between the Ottoman Empire (Turkey) and the Safavid Empire (Iran), with the Ottomans ceding back land they had captured from the Safavids after 1555, in return for Safavid payment of 200 loads of silk.
- November 30 – Battle of Swally: Forces of the British East India Company and Portugal engage off the coast of India, resulting in an English victory.
- December 15 – Simon Marius becomes the first person on Earth to observe the Andromeda Galaxy through a telescope.
- December 28 – Galileo Galilei becomes the first astronomer to observe the planet Neptune when in conjunction with Jupiter. He mistakenly catalogues it as a fixed star, because of its extremely slow motion along the ecliptic. Neptune will not be truly recognized as a planet until 1846, about 234 years later, when Johann Gottfried Galle first sights it in the Berlin Observatory.

=== Date unknown ===
- The Nagoya Castle is completed in Japan.
- The Okamoto Daihachi incident in Japan.
- Thomas Shelton's English translation of the first half of Don Quixote is published. It is the first translation of the Spanish novel into any language.

== Births ==
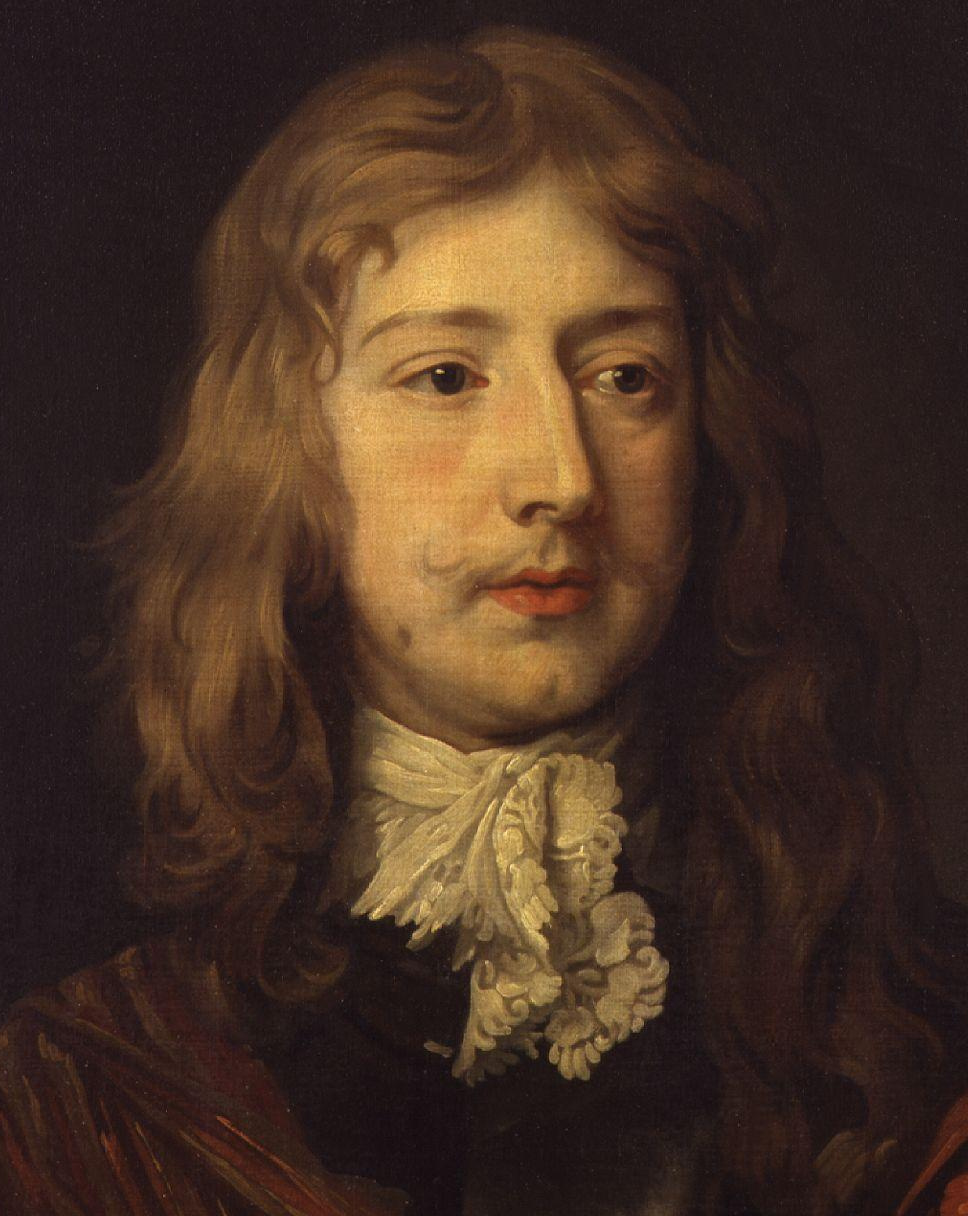
Thomas Killigrew

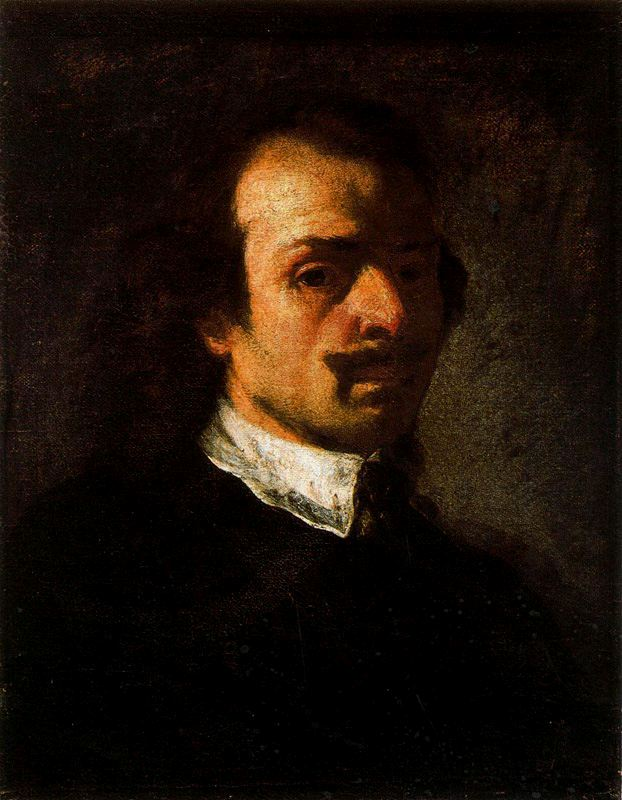
Pier Francesco Mola

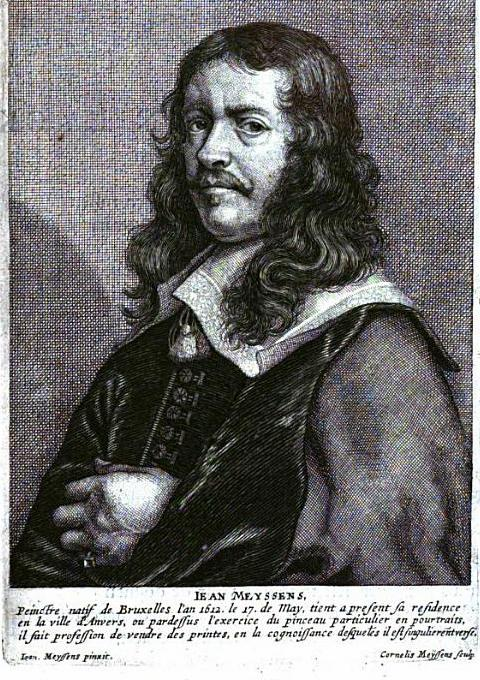
Joannes Meyssens

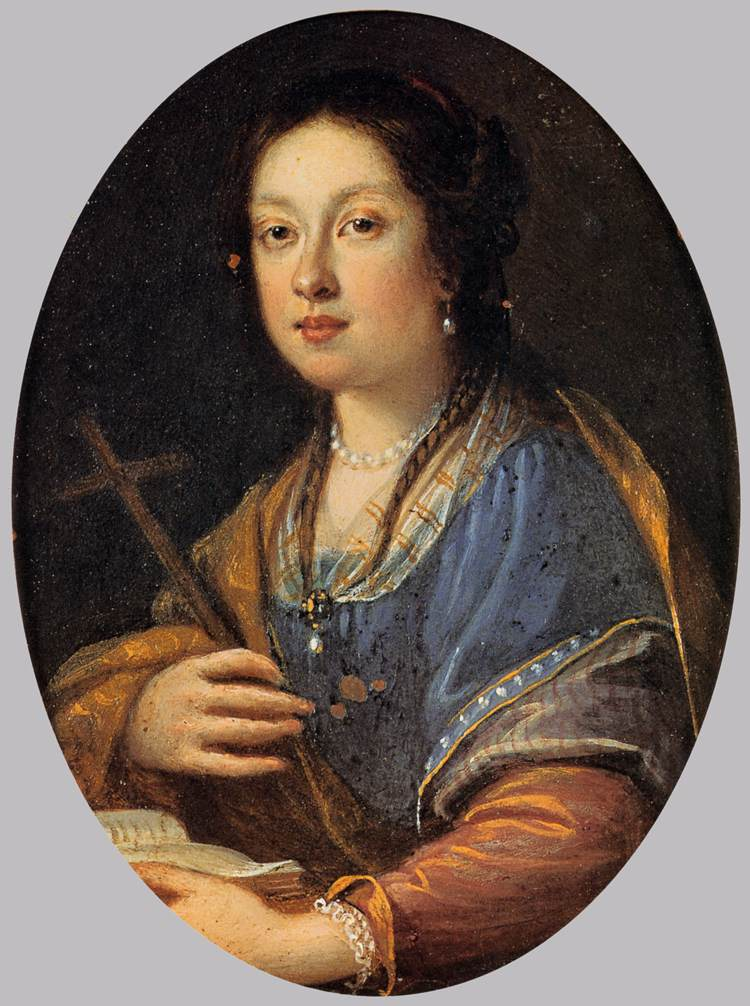
Margherita de' Medici

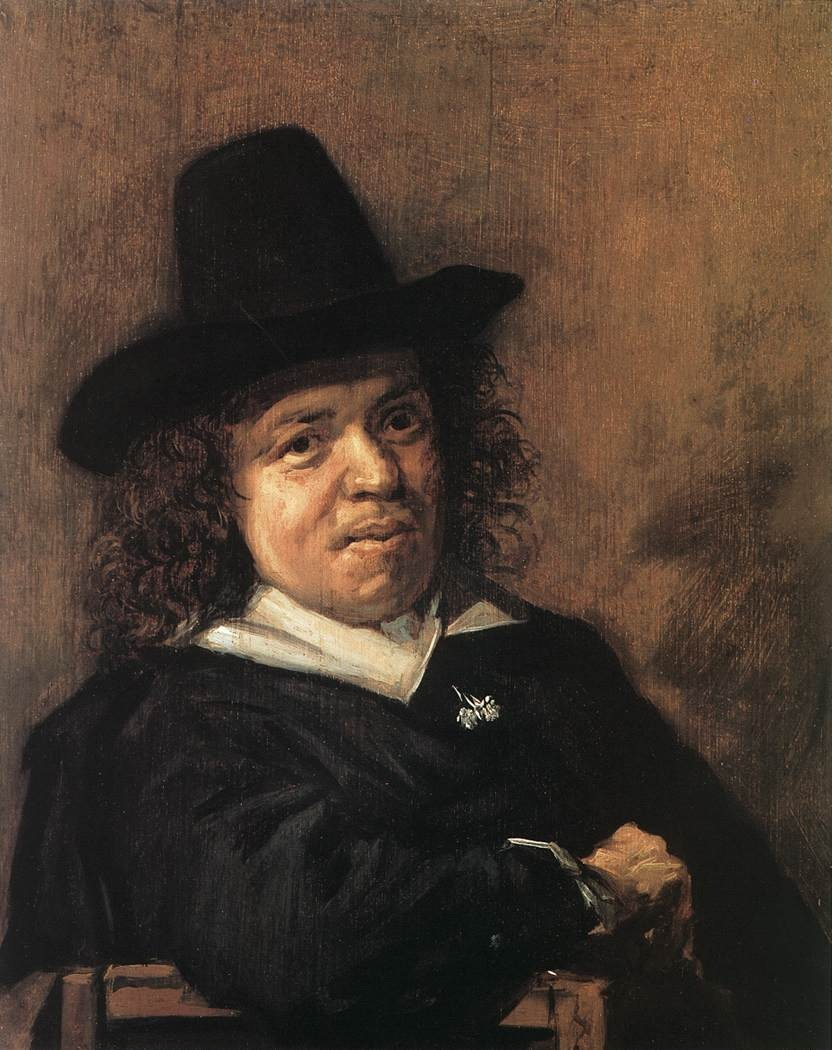
Frans Post

=== January–March ===
- January 17 – Thomas Fairfax, English Civil War general (d. 1671)
- January 21 – Henry Casimir I of Nassau-Dietz, Stadtholder of Groningen, Friesland and Drenthe (d. 1640)
- January 22 – Daniel Zwicker, German physician (d. 1678)
- January 23 – George FitzGerald, 16th Earl of Kildare, Irish earl (d. 1660)
- February 1 – William West, English politician (d. 1670)
- February 2 – Thomas Wentworth, 5th Baron Wentworth, English baron and politician (d. 1665)
- February 4 – Arthur Spry, English politician (d. 1685)
- February 5 – Crown Prince Sohyeon, Korean crown prince (d. 1645)
- February 6 – Antoine Arnauld, French theologian (d. 1694)
- February 7 – Thomas Killigrew, English dramatist and theatre manager (d. 1683)
- February 9 – Pier Francesco Mola, Italian painter of the High Baroque (d. 1666)
- February 15 – Paul de Chomedey, Sieur de Maisonneuve, French military officer, founder of Montreal in New France (d. 1676)
- February 20 – Richard Olmsted, Connecticut settler (d. 1687)
- February 21 – Lorenzo Imperiali, Italian cardinal (d. 1673)
- February 22 (bapt.) – George Digby, 2nd Earl of Bristol, English statesman (d. 1677)
- March 20 – Anne Bradstreet, née Dudley, English-born American Puritan poet (d. 1672)

=== April–June ===
- April 6 – James Stewart, 1st Duke of Richmond (d. 1655)
- April 10 – Francesco Lorenzo Brancati di Lauria, Italian Catholic cardinal (d. 1693)
- April 12 – Simone Cantarini, Italian painter and engraver (d. 1648)
- April 28 – Odoardo Farnese, Duke of Parma and Piacenza from 1622 to 1646 (d. 1646)
- May 6 – François-Joseph Bressani, Italian missionary (d. 1672)
- May 10 – Francesco Palliola, Italian Servant of God (d. 1648)
- May 12 – Laurence Womock, English Bishop of St David's (d. 1687)
- May 17
  - Matthew Babington, English politician (d. 1669)
  - Joannes Meyssens, Flemish painter (d. 1670)
- May 26 – Raja Wodeyar II, King of Mysore (d. 1638)
- May 31 – Margherita de' Medici, Italian noble (d. 1679)
- June 1 – Frans Post, Dutch painter (d. 1680)
- June 23 – André Tacquet, Brabantian mathematician, Jesuit priest (d. 1660)
- June 25 – John Albert Vasa, Polish bishop (d. 1634)
- June 29 – Sir William Bowyer, 1st Baronet, English politician (d. 1679)

=== July–September ===
- July 23 – Christian Lupus, Flemish historian (d. 1681)
- July 27 – Murad IV, Ottoman Sultan (d. 1640)
- August 2 – Saskia van Uylenburgh, wife of painter Rembrandt van Rijn (d. 1642)
- August 10 – Charles de Grimaldi-Régusse, French aristocrat (d. 1687)
- August 12 – Allart Pieter van Jongestall, Dutch jurist, politician, and diplomat (d. 1676)
- August 17 – Jeremi Wiśniowiecki, Polish nobleman (d. 1651)
- August 23 – Francis Lascelles, English politician (d. 1667)
- August 28 – Marcus Zuerius van Boxhorn, Dutch scholar (d. 1653)
- September 1 – Nicolas Chorier, French historian, lawyer and writer (d. 1692)
- September 24 – William Gawdy, English politician (d. 1669)

=== October–December ===
- October 6
  - Claude Françoise de Lorraine, Princess of Lorraine (d. 1648)
  - Louis Maracci, Italian priest (d. 1700)
- October 14
  - Pierre Bailloquet, French missionary (d. 1692)
  - Thomas Fitch, Connecticut settler (d. 1704)
- October 18 – John Eliot, English politician (d. 1685)
- October 19 – Nicolas Chaperon, French painter (d. 1656)
- October 20 – Richard Boyle, 1st Earl of Burlington, Anglo-Irish nobleman, Lord High Treasurer of Ireland, Cavalier (d. 1698)
- October 23 – Henry Lingen, English politician (d. 1662)
- October 25 – James Graham, 1st Marquess of Montrose, Scottish soldier (d. 1650)
- October 26 – Henry Wilmot, 1st Earl of Rochester (d. 1658)
- October 27 – Margravine Magdalene Sibylle of Brandenburg-Bayreuth, Electress of Saxony by marriage (1656–1680) (d. 1687)
- October 30 – Paul Würtz, Swedish general (d. 1676)
- November 7 – Pierre Mignard, French painter (d. 1695)
- November 11
  - Jean Garnier, French historian (d. 1681)
  - August Philipp, Duke of Schleswig-Holstein-Sonderburg-Beck, Danish-German prince and member of the House of Oldenburg (d. 1675)
  - Richard Sherlock, English priest (d. 1689)
- November 17 – Dorgon, Chinese Manchu prince (d. 1650)
- November 28 – Sir Thomas Whitmore, 1st Baronet, English politician and Baronet (d. 1653)
- December 2 – David Ryckaert III, Flemish painter (d. 1661)

== Deaths ==
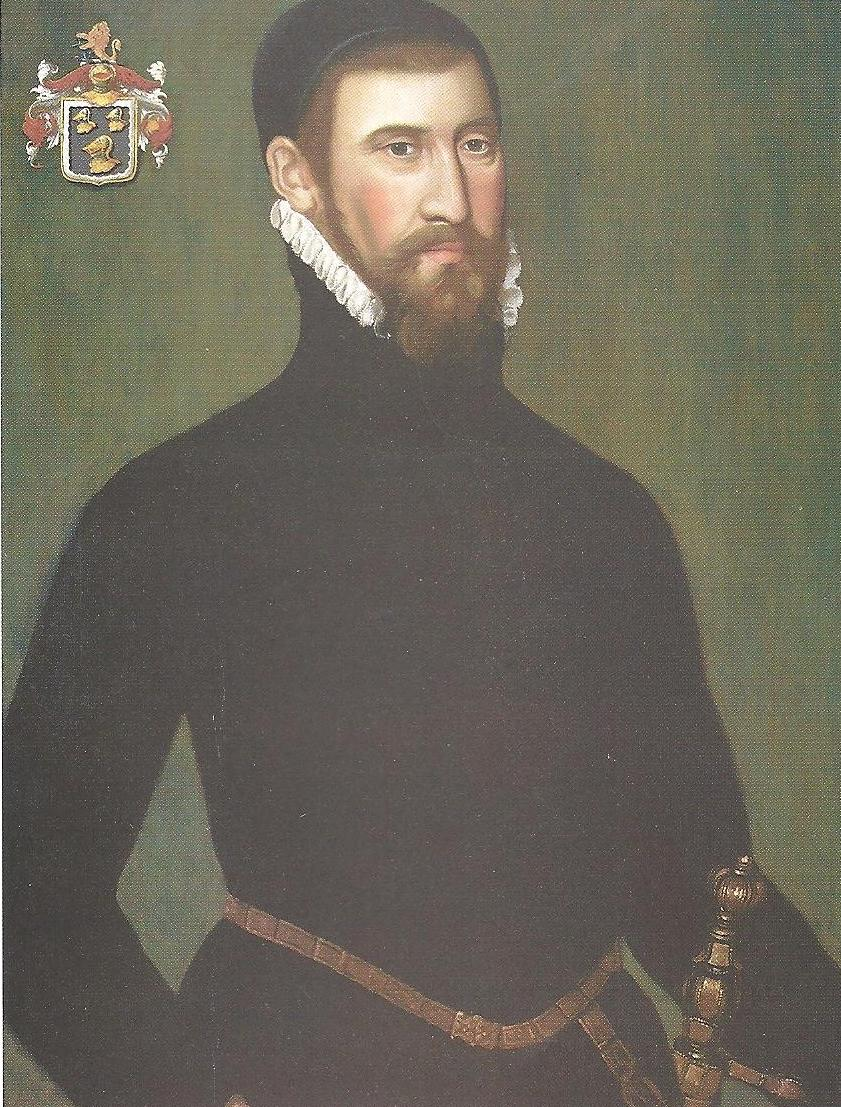
Leonard Holliday

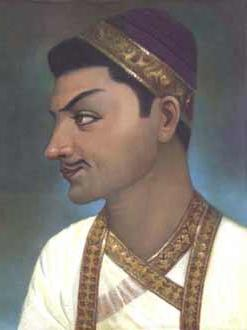
Muhammad Quli Qutb Shah

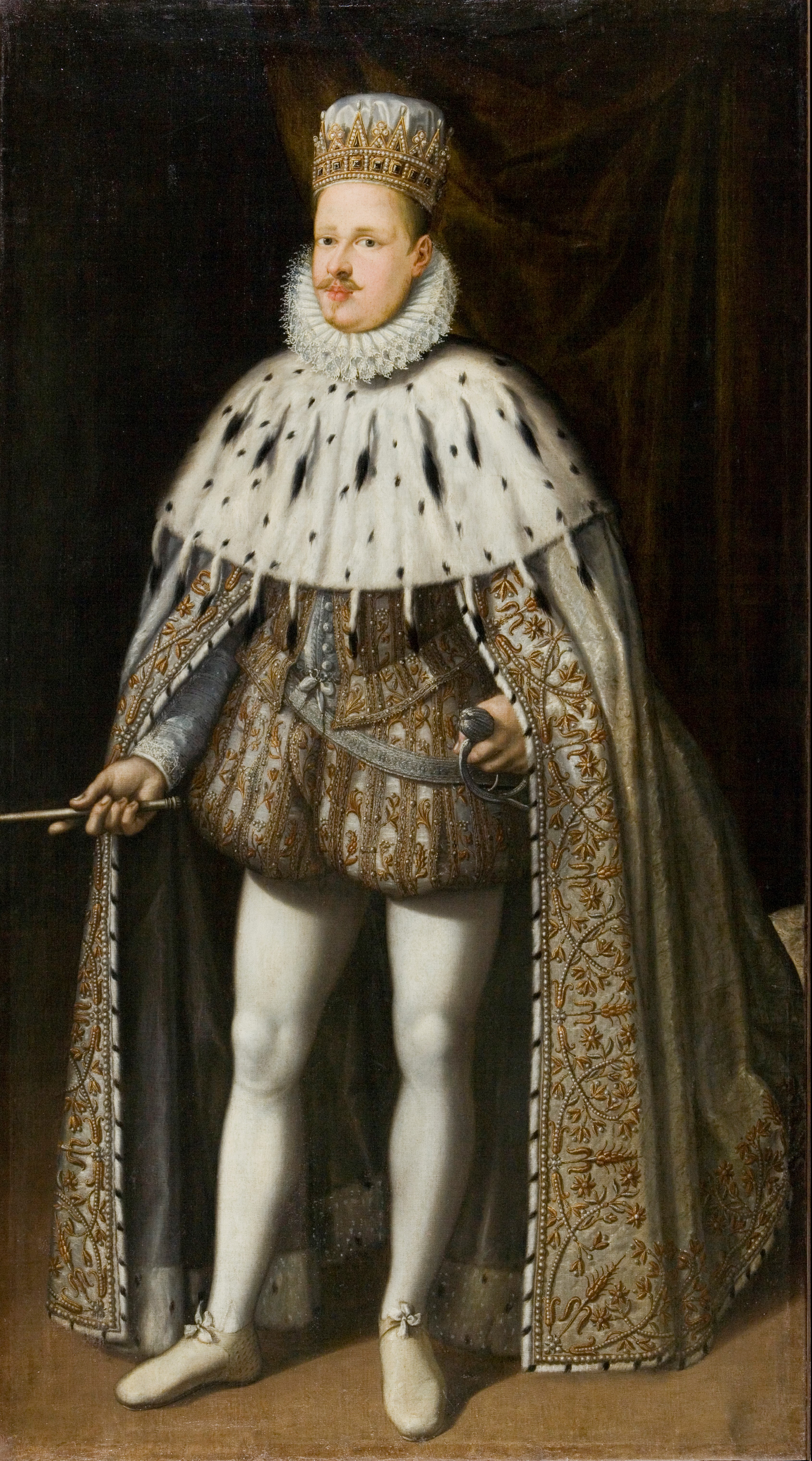
Vincenzo Gonzaga, Duke of Mantua

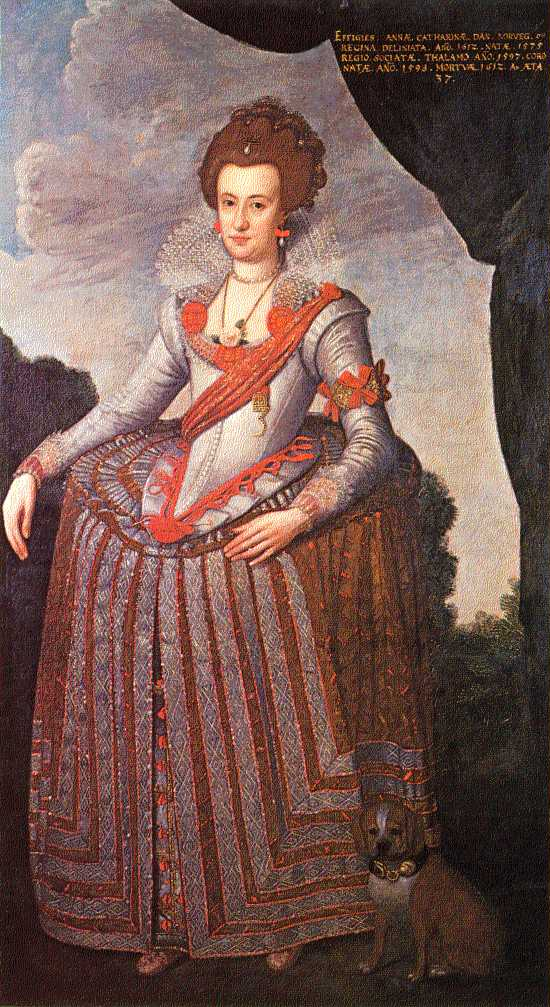
Anne Catherine of Brandenburg

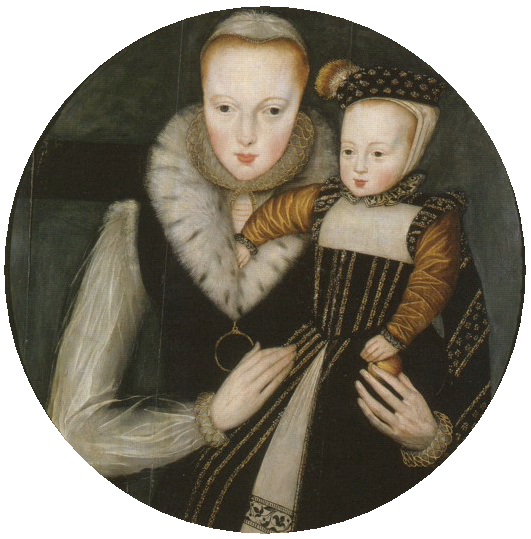
Edward Seymour, Lord Beauchamp

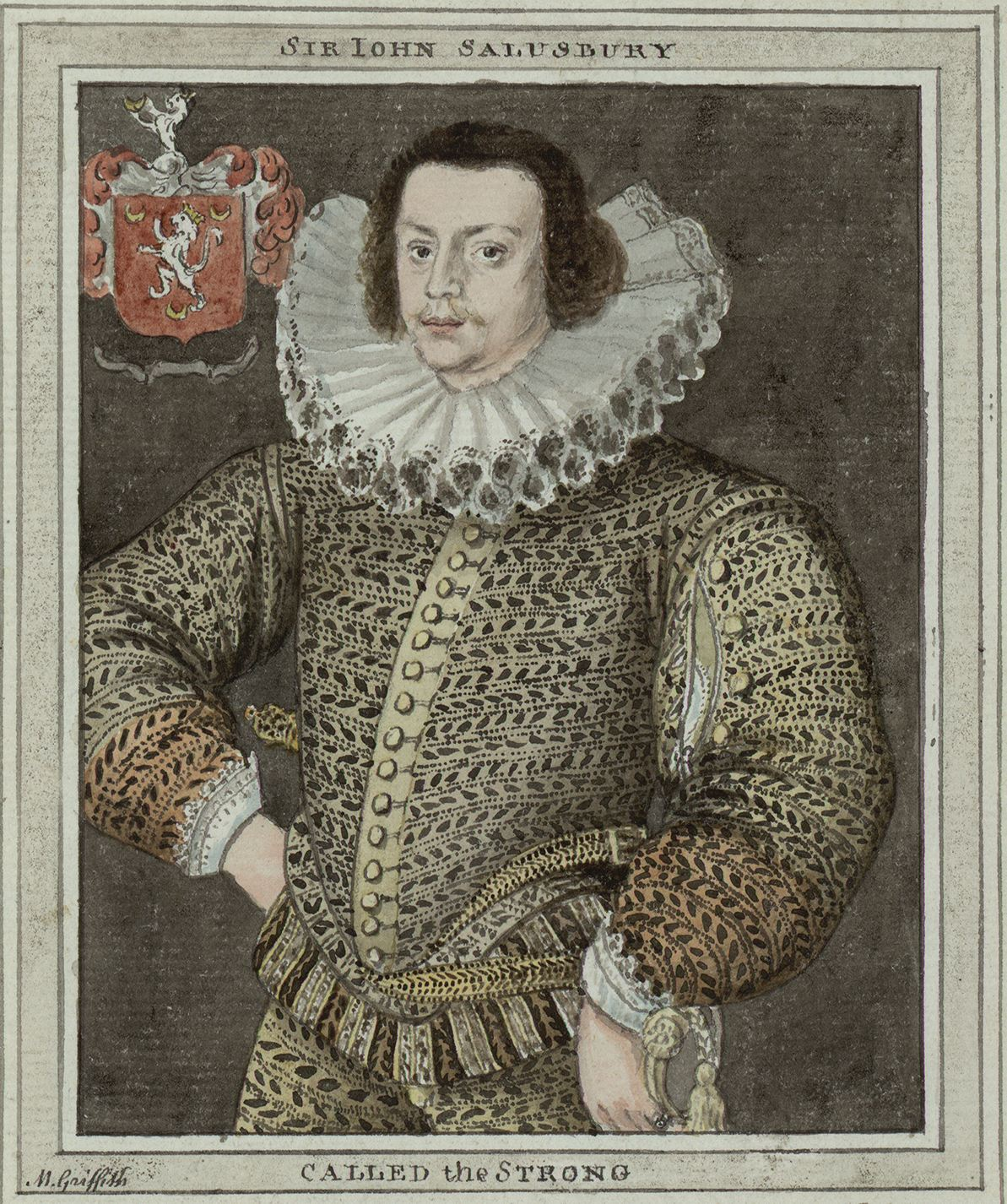
John Salusbury

=== January–March ===
- January 4 – Hendrik Laurenszoon Spiegel, Dutch writer (b. 1549)
- January 9 – Leonard Holliday, Lord Mayor of London, 1605-1606 (b. 1550)
- January 11 – Muhammad Quli Qutb Shah, fifth sultan of the Qutb Shahi Dynasty of Golkonda; founded the city of Hyderabad (b. 1565)
- January 12 – Charles III de Croÿ, Belgian noble (b. 1560)
- January 13 – Jane Dormer, English lady-in-waiting to Mary I (b. 1538)
- January 20 – Rudolf II, Holy Roman Emperor, Austrian Habsburg ruler (b. 1552)
- February 6 – Christopher Clavius, German mathematician and astronomer (b. 1538)
- February 9 – Vincenzo Gonzaga, Duke of Mantua (b. 1562)
- February 12 – Jodocus Hondius, Flemish cartographer (b. 1563)
- February 17 – Ernest of Bavaria, German Catholic bishop (b. 1554)
- February 18 – Roberto di Ridolfi, Italian conspirator against Elizabeth I of England (b. 1531)
- February 21 – Christian Barnekow, Danish noble, explorer and diplomat (b. 1556)
- March 16 – Margaret Fiennes, 11th Baroness Dacre (b. 1541)
- March 18 – Bartholomew Legate, English anti-Trinitarian martyr (b. c. 1575)
- March 19 – Sophia Olelkovich Radziwill, Polish-Lithuanian noble (b. 1585)

=== April–June ===
- April 5 – Diana Scultori, Italian engraver
- April 8 – Anne Catherine of Brandenburg (b. 1575)
- April 11
  - Emanuel van Meteren, Flemish historian (b. 1535)
  - Edward Wightman, English Baptist preacher (burned at the stake) (b. 1580)
- April 19 – Anne d'Escars de Givry, French Catholic cardinal (b. 1546)
- April 21 – David van Goorle, theologian and theoretical scientist (b. 1591)
- May – False Dmitry III, pretender to the Russian throne (secretly executed)
- May 19 – Gregorio Petrocchini, Italian Cardinal Bishop, Conclave member, Cardinal protector of the Augustines (b. 1535)
- May 24 – Robert Cecil, 1st Earl of Salisbury, English statesman and spymaster (b. 1563)
- May 31 – Willem Isaacsz Swanenburg, Dutch engraver (b. 1580)
- June 5 – Arima Harunobu, Japanese daimyō (b. 1567)
- June 8 – Hans Leo Hassler, German composer (b. 1562)
- June 21 – Edward Seymour, Lord Beauchamp (b. 1561)
- June 26 – Roger Manners, 5th Earl of Rutland, eldest surviving son of John Manners (b. 1576)

=== July–September ===
- July 16 – Leonardo Donato, Doge of Venice (b. 1536)
- July 24
  - Ottavio Mirto Frangipani, Italian bishop and papal diplomat (b. 1544)
  - John Salusbury, Welsh politician (b. 1567)
- July 29 – Jacques Bongars, French scholar and diplomat (b. 1554)
- August 3 – John Bond, English politician and classicist (b. 1550)
- August 4 – Hugh Broughton, English scholar (b. 1549)
- August 9 – Philipp Ludwig II, Count of Hanau-Münzenberg (1580–1612) (b. 1576)
- August 12 – Giovanni Gabrieli, Italian composer (b. c. 1554)
- August 15 – Michael Hicks, English politician (b. 1543)
- August 18 – Giacomo Boncompagni, Italian feudal lord of the 16th century (b. 1548)
- August 20 – Naitō Nobunari, Japanese samurai and daimyō of Omi Province (b. 1545)
- September 9 – Nakagawa Hidenari, Japanese warlord (b. 1570)
- September 12 – Tsar Vasili IV of Russia (b. 1552)
- September 13 – Karin Månsdotter, Queen of Sweden (b. 1550)
- September 24 – Johannes Lippius, German theologian, philosopher, composer, and music theorist (b. 1585)
- September 27 – Piotr Skarga, Polish Jesuit and polemicist (b. 1536)
- September 28 – Ernst Soner, German physician (b. 1572)

=== October–December ===
- October 7
  - Menso Alting, Dutch preacher and reformer (b. 1541)
  - Giovanni Battista Guarini, Italian poet (b. 1538)
- October 10 – Bernardino Poccetti, Italian painter (b. 1548)
- October 23 – János Petki, Hungarian politician (b. 1572)
- October 28 – Edward Darcy, English politician (b. 1544)
- November 1 – Charles, Count of Soissons, French prince du sang and military commander in the struggles over religion and the throne (b. 1566)
- November 2 – Maurice, Duke of Saxe-Lauenburg, 1581–1612 (b. 1551)
- November 6
  - Nicholas Fitzherbert, English martyr (b. 1550)
  - Henry Frederick, Prince of Wales, elder son of King James I & VI and Anne of Denmark (b. 1594)
- November 9 – Paul Jenisch, German pastor (b. 1551)
- November 16 – William Stafford, English spy (b. 1554)
- November 20 – John Harington, English courtier, writer and inventor of a flush toilet (b. 1561)
- November 23
  - Juan Fernández de Olivera, Spanish colonial governor (b. 1560)
  - Elizabeth Jane Weston, English Czech poet (b. 1582)
- November 26 – Thomas Walmsley, English judge (b. 1537)
- December 4 – Jacob Taets van Amerongen, Teutonic Knights commander (b. 1542)
- December 12 – Nicholas Mosley, Lord Mayor of London (b. 1527)
- December 22 – Francesco IV Gonzaga, Duke of Mantua (b. 1586)

=== Date unknown ===
- Federico Barocci, Italian painter (b. c. 1535)
- Isabel Barreto, Spanish admiral (b. 1567)
