= French–Tripolitania War =

French campaign against piracy (1681–1685)

Franco-Tripolitanian War (1681–1685)
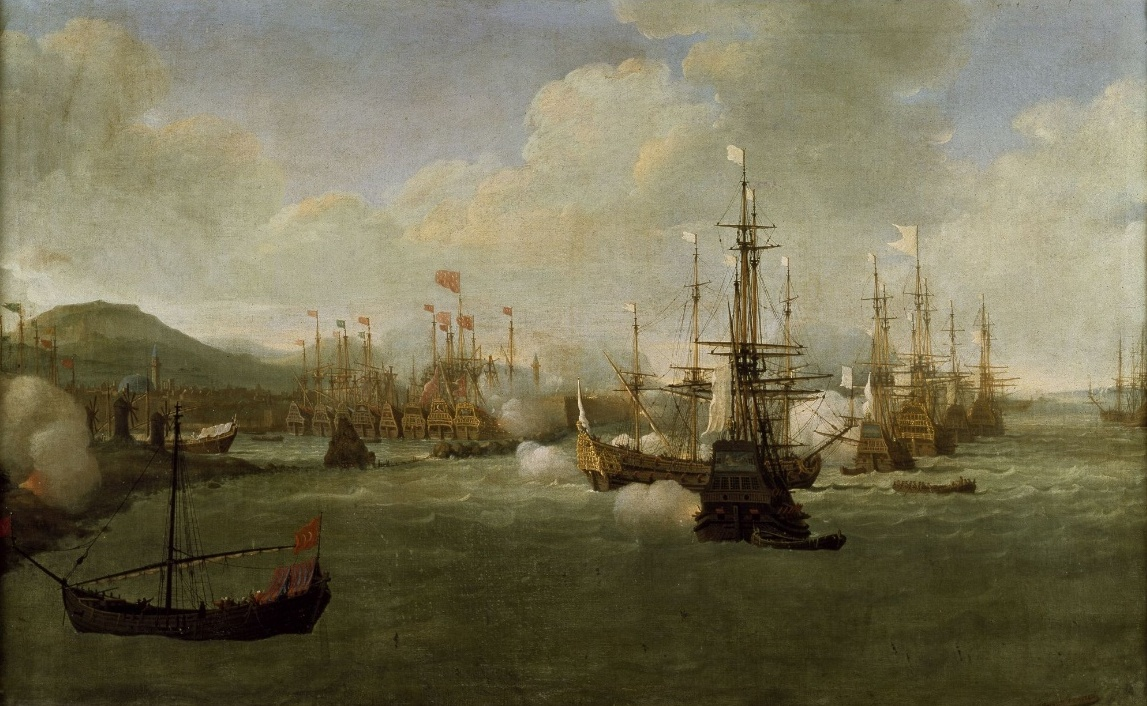
- Bombardment of Chios by the fleet of Admiral Duquesne in 1681
Date	1681–1685
Location	Chios, Tripoli and Tunis
Result	French victory

Belligerents
France	Tripolitania; Tunis

Commanders and leaders
Louis XIV; Abraham Duquesne; Jean II d'Estrées	Unknown

The Franco–Tripolitanian War (1681-1685) was part of a wider campaign by France against the Barbary Pirates in the 1680s.

== Background ==
In June 1681, corsairs from the Regency of Tripolitania captured French merchant ships off the coast of Provence. Louis XIV sent Admiral Abraham Duquesne, with nine ships under his command, to hunt down the pirates. He tracked them to Chios, which had recently been captured by the Ottoman Empire where they were taking refuge.

== Bombardment of Chios (1681) ==
Duquesne sends an emissary, M. de Saint-Amand, to summon the pacha commanding in Chios to send out the corsairs, under penalty of destruction of the port and the fortresses, which he refuses. On July 23, 1681, Duquesne ordered the ships of his squadron to bombard the city and the port. The French fire was so vigorous that in less than four hours the Barbary fleet, the fortresses and the port were badly damaged. A Turkish account of the time recounts this attack: "The French infidels came to Scio, they fired for four hours on the vessels of Tripoli Barbary, they also damaged the fortresses and the mosques. "Many Greeks are among the victims because they are the majority on the island. Several Orthodox churches are affected."

Despite the relentless bombardment, the Pirates refused to surrender to the French. The French in turn then establish a blockade of the Port. This created diplomatic issues between France and the Ottoman Empire as France is infringing on their Sovereignty. Louis did not want war with the Ottomans due to French economic interests in maintaining good relations with the Ottomans and therefore makes the French merchants in Constantinople pay 80,000 Crowns compensation to the Turkish Authorities to appease them.

After several weeks of blockade, the pirates finally capitulate and come to terms for peace, which is signed at the end of December 1681. The Treaty brings allededly brings end to the war and all captured slaves are freed. On the Pirates return to Tripoli this peace is rejected by the Dey and the Captains are beheaded. Further French action would be required in 1685.

== Bombardment of Tripoli (1685) ==
The French fleet, commanded by Jean II d'Estrées, bombarded Tripoli in 1685, causing extensive destruction in the city. The bombardment continued through the night, with contemporary reports describing the use of hundreds of explosive shells against the city. The attack caused widespread panic among the inhabitants, many of whom moved their families and possessions to safer areas outside the city.

The bombardment caused extensive destruction in Tripoli and contributed to bringing the Dey of Tripoli to terms with France. The devastation also caused concern in the neighbouring Regency of Tunis and contributed to its capitulation without a fight.

The defenders attempted to repel the French fleet from the harbor. The coastal towers opened fire on the attacking ships and succeeded in destroying a small boat, forcing the French to withdraw temporarily. When the French subsequently attempted to approach the shore, large numbers of inhabitants and defenders gathered and forced them away from the harbor.

Despite the defenders' success in preventing a French landing, the bombardment placed Tripoli under considerable pressure. A settlement was subsequently reached between the French and the inhabitants of the city, under which prisoners were exchanged and the Tripolitanians paid 200,000 riyals to the French. French merchants and sailors were subsequently permitted to enter the city to obtain provisions.

The bombardment demonstrated the growing effectiveness of European naval artillery against the North African regencies and contributed to the pressure placed upon Tripoli by France.
