= Nicolas Talon =

French Jesuit, historian and ascetical writer

Nicolas Talon (31 August 1605 – 29 March 1691) was a French Jesuit, historian, and ascetical writer.

== Biography ==
Talon was born at Moulins. Entering the Society of Jesus in 1621, he taught literature for several years. After his ordination he gained some reputation as a preacher, was a worker in the prisons and hospitals of Paris, and served as army chaplain with the French troops in Flanders, winning the admiration of the men and the lifelong friendship of the Prince de Conde.

Talon assisted the notorious outlaw Aime du Poncet during his painfully protracted execution, and it is said that Poncet died penitent and resigned.

Talon died in Paris. Talon's portrait was engraved by Michael Heere. Carlos Sommervogel mentions 300 of his letters in the d'Aumale collection at Chantilly.

== Publications ==
- Oraison funebre de Louis XIII (Funerary oration for Louis XIII; Paris, 1644)
- Description de la pompe funebre du Prince de Conde (Paris, 1646)
- La vie de St. Francois de Sales (Paris, 1640)
- La vie de St. Francois Borgia (Paris, 1671)
- Les peintures chretiennes ('Christian Painters'; Paris, 1667 according to Weiss, 1647 according to Sommervogel)
- A Bible history, the first part of which, Histoire sainte, was published at Paris in 1640. The author's purpose was to interest his readers in the Old Testament story. The book was popular and was several times reprinted, notably in a Cramoisy edition (1665). The Marquis of Winchester produced an English translation in 1653. Talon's Historie sainte is considered to be more a romance than a reliable exposition of facts.
- A sequel, L'histoire sainte du Nouveau Testament (Sacred History of the New Testament; Paris, 1669). It met with little success.
