= Port of Honfleur =

Harbour in Honfleur, France

Coordinates: 49°25′10″N 0°14′20″E

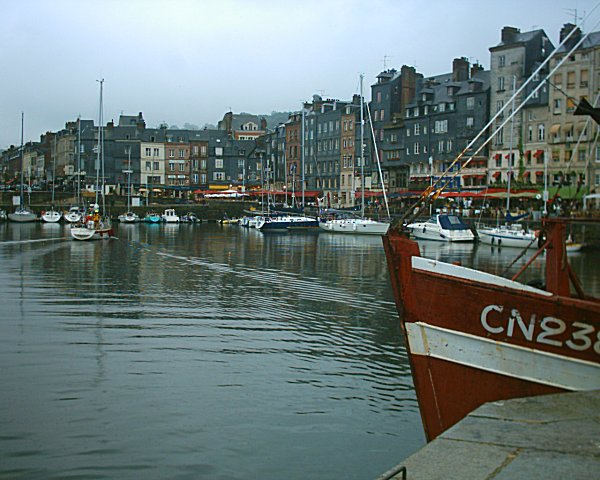
The Vieux Bassin.

The Port of Honfleur, Port de Honfleur, is the harbour of the Norman town of Honfleur, France. Expeditions to Quebec from this harbour led to its foundation.

== History ==
The port was founded by Vikings.

=== A port of exploration ===
Jacques Cartier founded Canada in 1534 and gave it to France. He adopts the name Canada which signifies village in Huron. The King of France, Francis 1st, disappointed by the lack of gold or diamonds, decided not to exploit the land. It is only two hundred years later, in the 17th century, that Samuel de Champlain received orders to settle the vast territory. Having left Honfleur, he founded Québec. The orders of Louis XIV made the first settlements true Norman colonies. More than 4,000 peasants settled and planted the land. Fishing, hunting and the fur trade flourished.

=== The Vieux Bassin ===
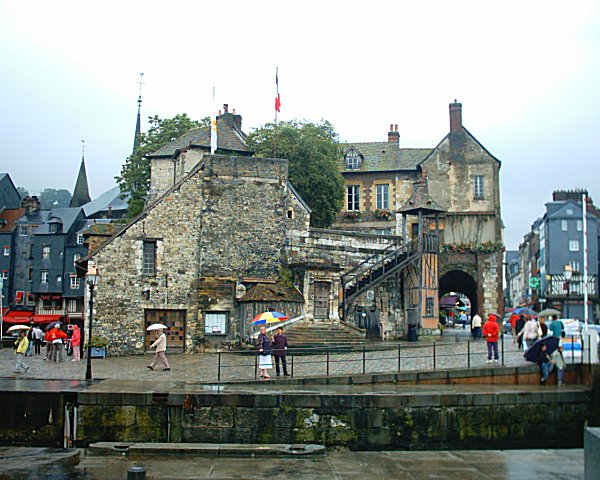
The Lieutenancy.

The port was remodelled in 1681 by Abraham Duquesne, under orders from Colbert. The former port was a brushed-upon shore in a small haven. Due to the expansion of the port, the Western fortifications of the town were demolished. The port is bordered on three sides, by buildings of two distinct styles; large stone houses on the Southside (Quai Saint-Etienne) and high and narrow wooden houses to the North (Quai Sainte Catherine).

The lieutenancy building (la Lieutenance) is at the entrance to the old harbour. It is an old building of the 18th century, and the former home of the Governor of Honfleur. One of the sides of the building is an old gate of the city, the Port de Caen, which was to be part of the city's fortifications. It was between 1684 and 1789 home to the Lieutenant of the king. It became, in 1793, the commerce tribunal.

=== Former glory ===
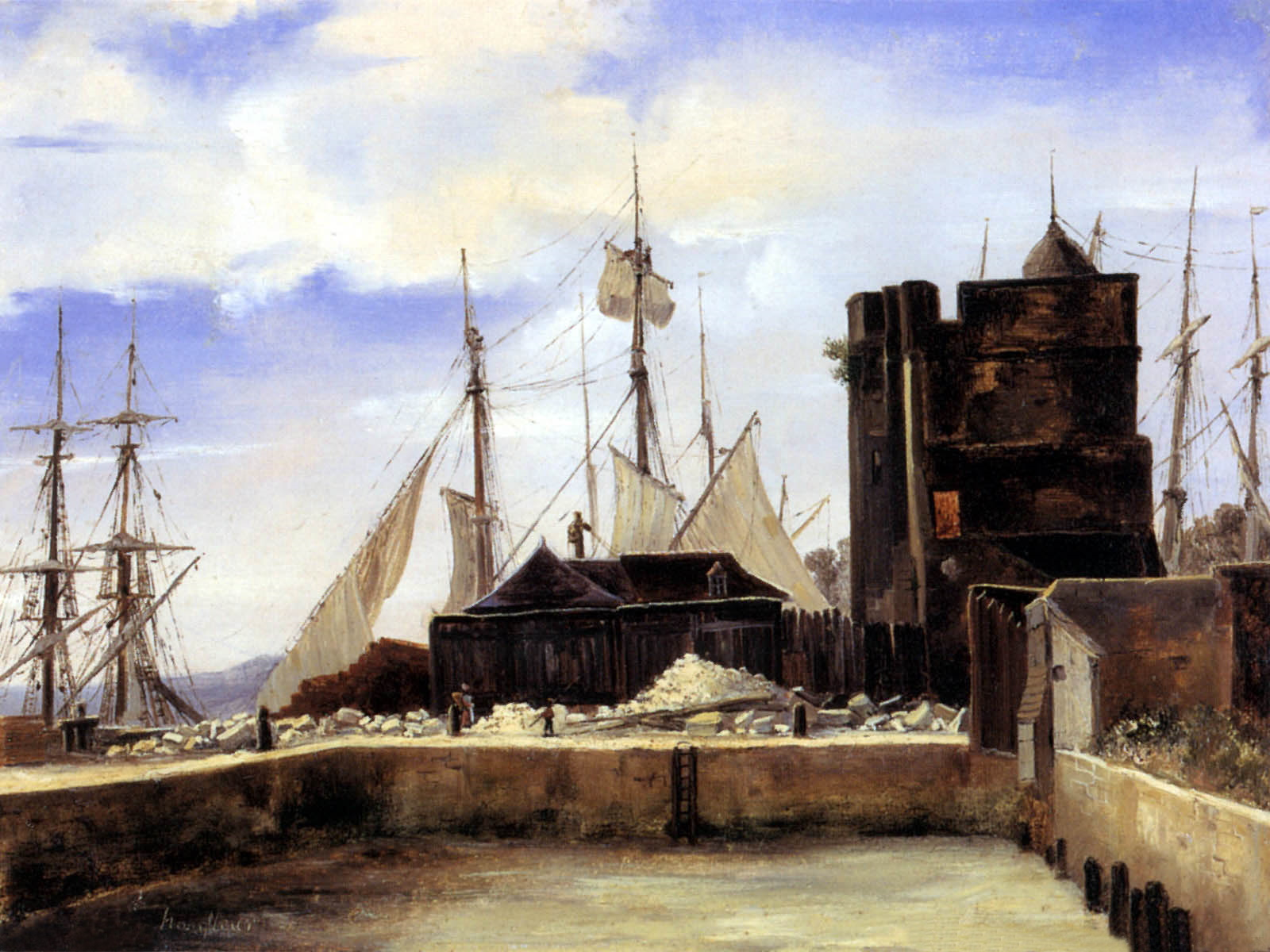
The old port, painted by Corot.

At the end of each year, an almanac, called the Annuaire administratif du Département, used to be published, showing statistics relevant to Calvados. Some data of the Port of Honfleur can be found in these books and in 1865, traffic to and from Honfleur was as follows:

- Important traffic with England was observed as well as the development of traffic from Norway. Traffic was 384 sailing ships transporting 44,177 tons and 2,011 steam ships transporting 272,169 tons. Ferries to and from Le Havre transported 232,809 passengers.
- Goods traffic was composed of eggs, cheeses, butter, poultry, cereals, vegetables, apples and pears and cider to England, horses and farm stock from England.

The 1881 annuaire was far more precise, detailing the number of passengers to and from several destinations; 199,789 to and from Le Havre, 2,320 to and from Rouen. It also added 115 to and from Southampton and 91 to Littlehampton, a total of 345,992 passengers that year.

Fishing boats were present in numbers, and in 1881, 75 ships were registered and stationed in Honfleur. The sum from the selling of seafood amounted to 391,390 francs. Most of the seafood fished was eaten nearby, but some was exported to Paris and other cities and transported by train by the Chemins de Fer de l'Ouest. The catch amounted to 183,491 kb of moules (mussels) and 185,190 kg of fresh fish.

Notable imports were wood from Norway, coal from England, wheat from America and lime.

The largest ships to have entered the Port of Honfleur were the Aneroïd, an English, three-mast sailing ship, the Italian three-mast sailing ship, the Nostra-Madre and the English passenger ship, the Newsleydale, with 5.3 m draft.

== Layout ==
The port is but a series of basins, linked to the Seine by an access channel.

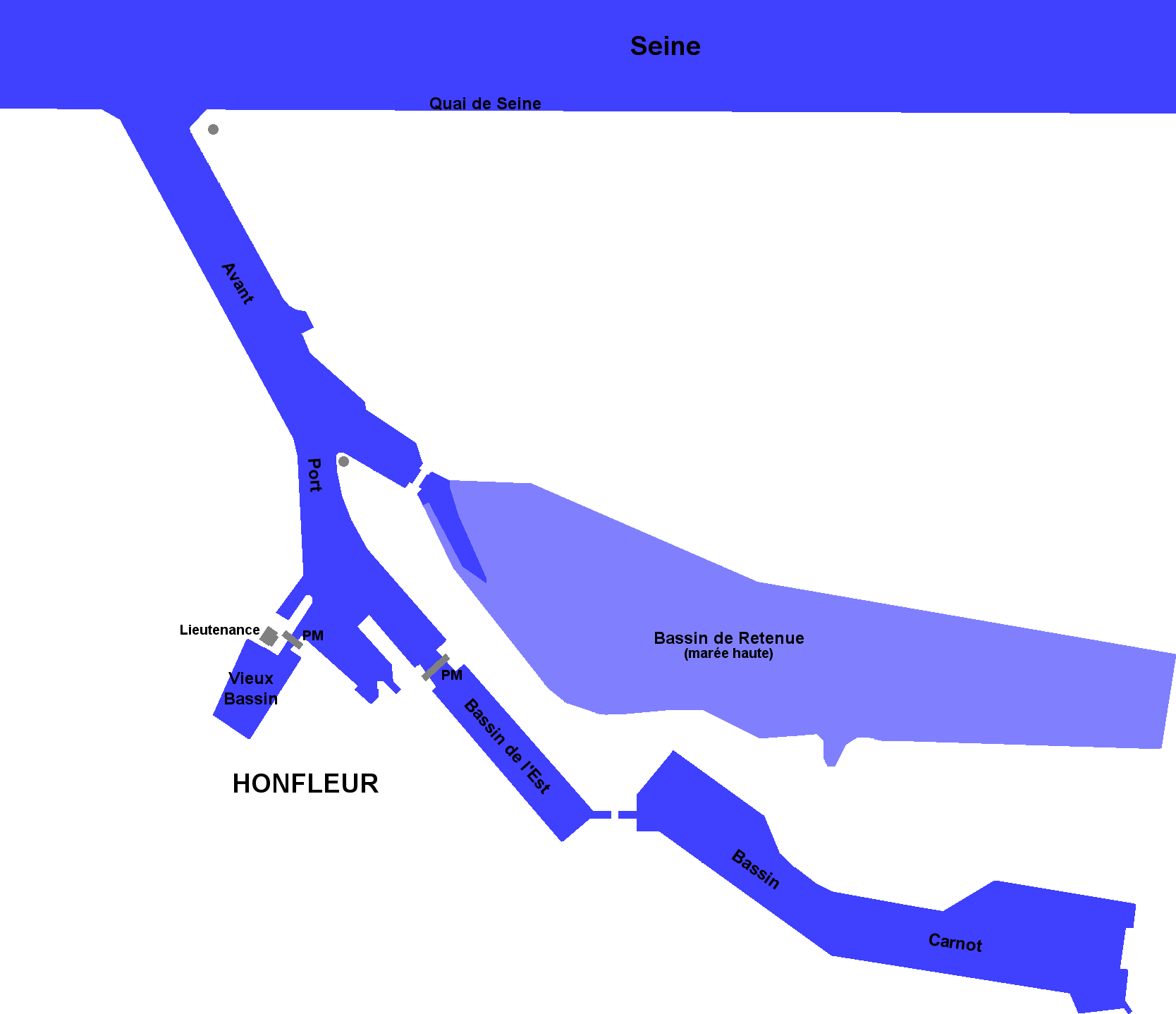
Plan of the Port of Honfleur.
