= Pierre Bailloquet =

Pierre Bailloquet (14 October 1612 – 7 June 1692) was a Jesuit missionary to the First Nation people of Canada.

Born in France, Bailloquet entered studies with the Jesuits at eighteen and after ordination taught for some time in France. He arrived in Quebec in 1647 and spent forty-five years as a missionary from Acadia to Illinois. It was a life of great hardships and dangers. He died in his eightieth year after sixty-one years in the religious life.
