= François Vavasseur =

- Born: December 8, 1605; Paray-le-Monial
- Died: December 16, 1681 (aged 76); Paris, France
- Occupations: Jesuit, Humanist, Polemicist
- Writing career
- Language: French, Latin
- Years active: 1637–1681
- Period: 17th century
- Genres: Religious texts, Literary criticism, Poetry
- Subjects: Theology, Scripture, Rhetoric, Epigram

François Vavasseur (English: Francois Vavasseur; 8 December 1605, at Paray-le-Monial – 16 December 1681 at Paris, France) was a French Jesuit humanist and polemicist.

He entered the Society of Jesus, on 25 October 1621, where he taught humanities and rhetoric for seven years, then positive theology and Scripture at Bourges, and later at Paris. His first work was a paraphrase of the Book of Job in Latin hexameters (1637), resumed and accompanied by a commentary in 1679.

He published also Theurgicon (1644), on the miracles of Christ, "Elegiarum liber" (1656), "De ludicra dictione" (1656); took an active part in the Jansenistic controversy ("Cornelius Jansenius Iprensis suspectus", Paris, 1650), and defended himself against the charge of having written pamphlets concerning the Calaghan affair (De libello supposititio dissertatio, 1653). In this last writing he defined accurately the style of the Port Royal writers before the Provinciales:, monotonous and burdened with complicated periods. He wrote a sharp and learned criticism of the "Epigrammatum delectus" of Port-Royal (1659), "De epigrammate liber et epigrammatum libri tres" (1669), showing knowledge of Catullus, Martial, and the Greek anthology.

He was sensitive on this subject and took issue with his confrere René Rapin, who had practically declared that no modern had written a good epigram (Remarques sur les nouvelles réflexions du R.P. Rapin Jésuite, touchant la poétique, 1675). Guillaume de Lamoignon, Rapin's protector, had Vavasseur's pamphlet suppressed. "Pere Vavasseur was a learned man, one of those critical and severe minds which find something to bite even in good works, and which let nothing pass" (Sainte-Beuve, "Port-Royal", III, 528).

His other works include sermons, a commentary on Osee, and a dissertation on the beauty of Christ. All his writings were collected by the theologian Jean Leclerc (Amsterdam, 1709). His Latin writings had appeared previously in Paris (1683).
