= Christian Lupus =

Flemish theologian and historian

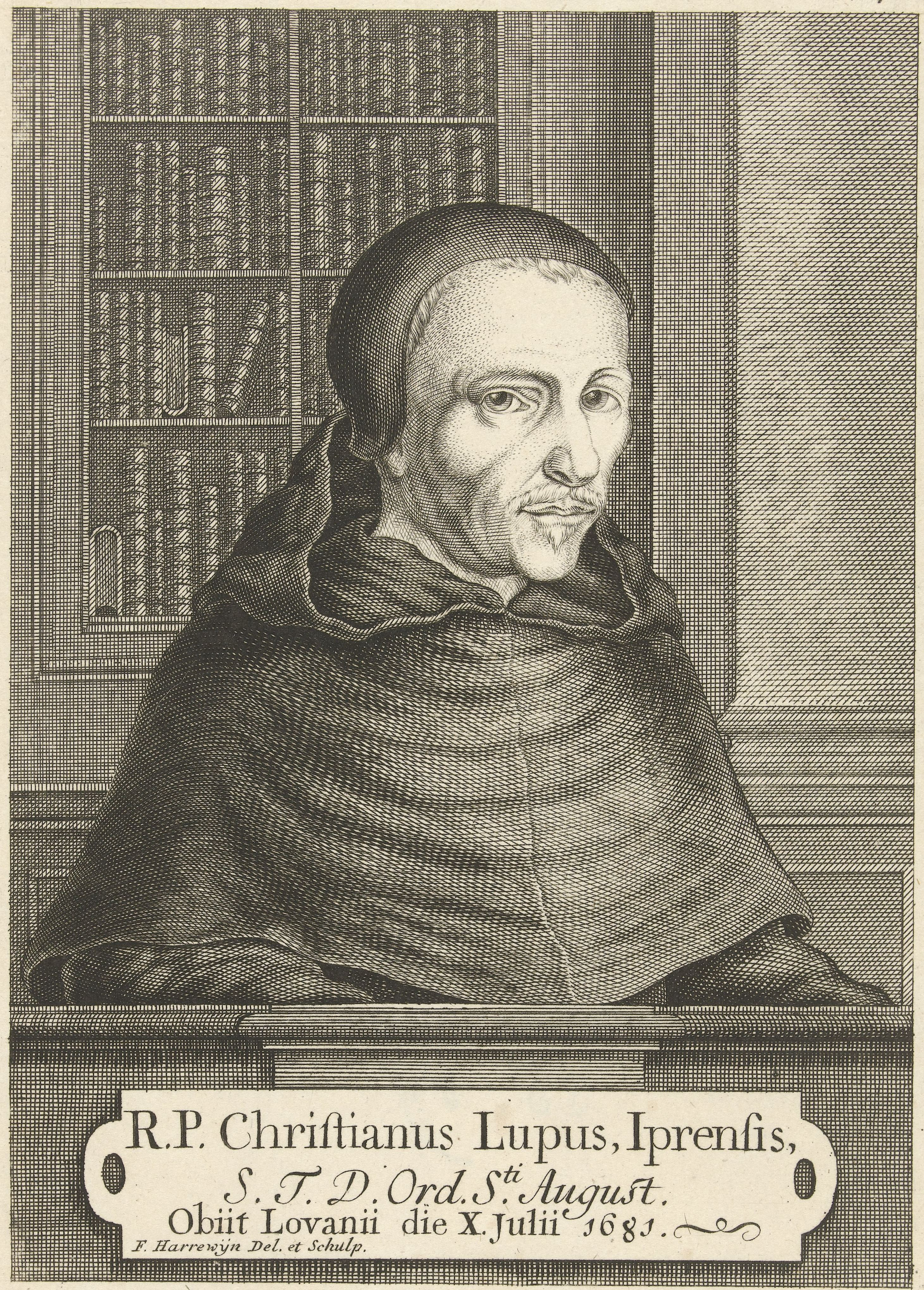
Christian Lupus

Christian Lupus (23 July 1612 – 10 July 1681) was a Flemish theologian and historian.

== Biography ==
Lupus was born at Ypres (Flanders). He joined the Augustinian Order at the age of fifteen, and on the completion of his studies, was appointed lecturer in theology, to the younger members of the order in Cologne. While occupying this position he won the confidence of the nuncio at Cologne, Fabio Chigi (later Pope Alexander VII). In 1640 Lupus was appointed professor of theology at the University of Leuven (French: Louvain), but, owing to his zeal for the teaching of St. Augustine, was suspected of Jansenism. The nuncio at Brussels accused him of it, and would not permit the University of Leuven to confer a doctor's degree upon him; only after the pope's mediation was it given to him. When the accusation was renewed, Alexander VII called him to Rome, where for the next five years he devoted himself under papal protection to the study of ecclesiastical history.

He returned to Leuven in 1660, and was elected provincial of the province; in 1667 he returned to Rome, accompanied by several professors of the theological faculty of Leuven. Innocent XI condemned sixty-five of the propositions denounced by him. On his return to Leuven he was appointed Regius Professor of theology, the first time a religious had ever held this office. He remained there until his death.

== Works ==
- His writings were published in thirteen parts, the first twelve in Venice, 1724–1729, in six folio volumes, the thirteenth in Bologna, in 1742. The first six under the title Synodorum generalium et provincialium statuta et canones cum notis et historicis dissertationibus (1665–1673) contain a detailed history of the councils, with many dissertations. The seventh part contains: Ad Ephesinum concilium variorum patrum epistolas, item commonitorium Coelestini papae, titulos decretorum Hilarii papae (Louvain, 1682).
- He also wrote critical replies to Pasquier Quesnel, Nicolas Boileau-Despréaux, and Gerbais. His writings are mostly collections of historical materials, usually little elaborated by him.
- Prodidagmata philosophica, toti philosophiæ præambvla (Brussel, 1640), available via KU Leuven Special Collections, is a handbook for university studies in philosophy.
