= Ippolito Aldobrandini =

Ippolito Aldobrandini may refer to various members of the Aldobrandini family:

- Pope Clement VIII (1536–1605)
- Ippolito Aldobrandini (cardinal) (1596–1638), grandnephew of Pope Clement VIII
