= Giovanni Aldobrandini =

Italian Roman Catholic bishop and cardinal

- Cardinal-Priest of San Simeone Profeta
- Church: Catholic Church
- See: San Simeone Profeta
- In office: 20 November 1570 – 7 September 1573
- Predecessor: Charles d'Angennes de Rambouillet
- Successor: Scipione Lancelotti
- Other post: Major Penitentiary of the Apostolic Penitentiary (1572-1573)
- Previous posts: Bishop of Imola (1569-1573); Cardinal-Priest of Sant’Eufemia(1570)

Orders
- Consecration: 8 December 1569 by Scipione Rebiba
- Created cardinal: 17 May 1570 by Pope Pius V

Personal details
- Born: 1525 Fano, March of Ancona, Papal States
- Died: 7 September 1573 (aged 47–48) Rome, Papal States

Giovanni Aldobrandini (1525 – 7 September 1573) was an Italian Roman Catholic bishop and cardinal.

== Life ==
A member of the Aldobrandini family, Giovanni Aldobrandini was born in 1525, probably in Florence. He was the son of Silvestro Aldobrandini, governor of Fano, and wife Lisa Donati. His father was banished from Florence for opposing the Medici.

His siblings were Cardinal Ippolito Aldobrandini (1536–1605), who became Pope Clement VIII in 1592, Pietro Aldobrandini (? - Rome, 11 February 1587), married to Flaminia Ferracci (? - Rome, 27 April 1603), sister of lawyer Muzio Ferracci (parents of Olimpia Aldobrandini, 1st Princess of Rossano, and Cardinal Pietro Aldobrandini), Bernardo Aldobrandini, married to Livia Capizucchi, Giulia Aldobrandini, married to Aurelio Personeni da Ca' Passero (parents of Cinzio Personeni da Ca' Passero (Senigallia, 1531 - Rome, 1 January 1610)), and Elisabetta Aldobrandini, married to Aurelio Passeri, Doctor in Fine Arts and Medicine, son of Bernardino Passeri and wife (parents of Cardinal Cinzio Passeri Aldobrandini).

Giovanni was educated at the University of Ferrara, becoming a doctor of both laws on February 9, 1545. He later helped his father in his duties as auditor at the Este court.

From September 1551 until August 1552, Aldobrandini was governor of Rimini. He was a consistorial lawyer from 1554 to 1556. In 1556, he became an auditor of the Roman Rota.

Ecclesiastically, he was a cleric of Florence and Chaplain of His Holiness. On August 26, 1569, he was elected Bishop of Imola. He was consecrated as a bishop in capella domus suæ solitæ habitationis by Scipione Rebiba, Archbishop of Pisa, on December 8, 1569, with Giulio Antonio Santorio, Archbishop of Santa Severina, and Felice Peretti Montalto, Bishop of Sant'Agata de' Goti, serving as co-consecrators. He resigned the government of his see sometime before February 9, 1573.

Pope Pius V made him a cardinal priest in the consistory of May 17, 1570. He received the red hat and the titular church of Sant'Euphemia. On November 20, 1570, he opted for the titular church of San Simeone Profeta. The pope charged him with convincing Spain and the Republic of Venice to join a league against the Ottoman Empire or to contribute money to that cause. He participated in the papal conclave of 1572 that elected Pope Gregory XIII. He served as Grand Penitentiary from December 14, 1572, until his death.

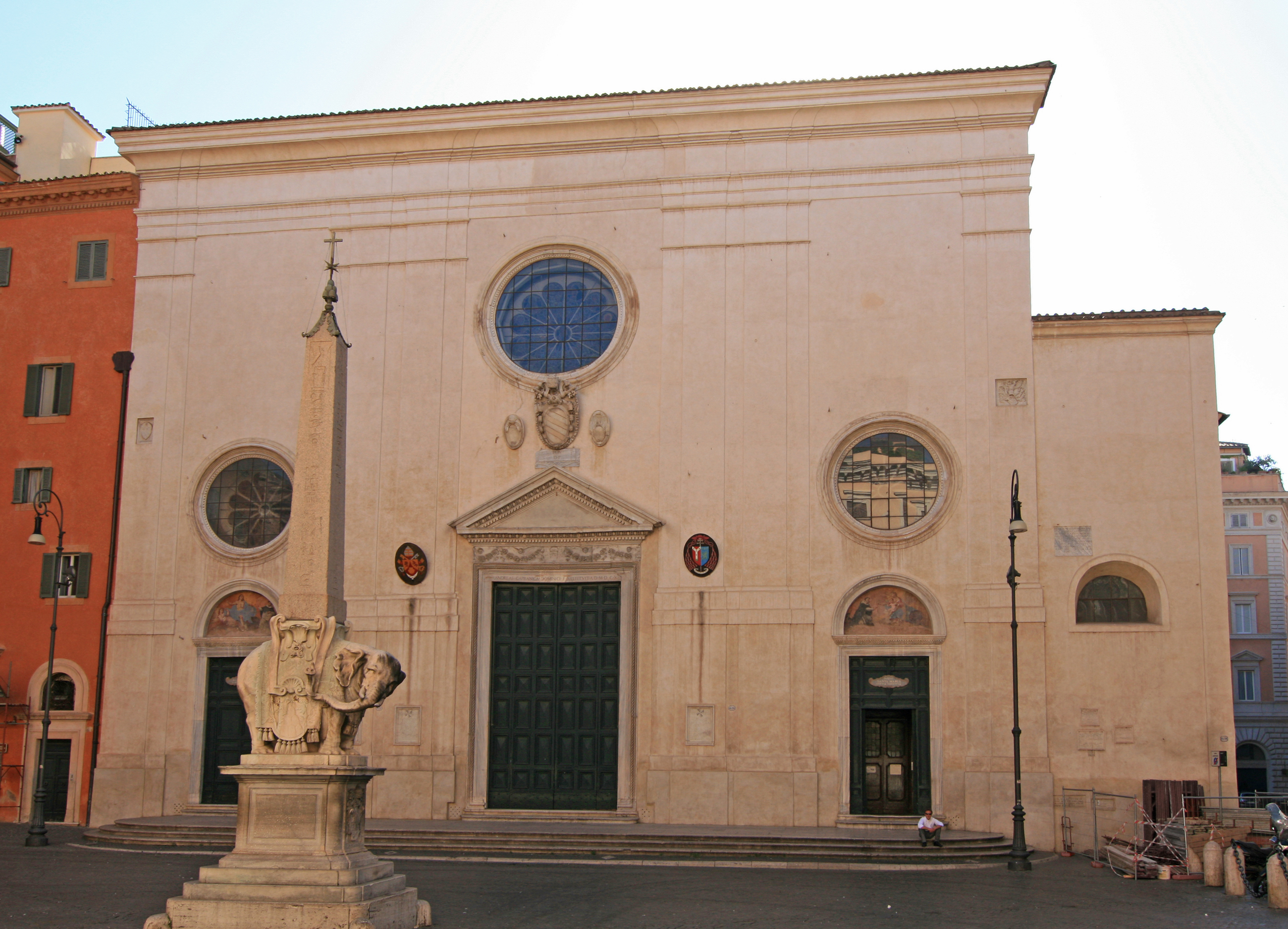
The resting place of Aldobrandini, the Santa Maria Sopra Minerva in Rome

In 1573, he was Prefect of the Signature of Apostolic Briefs. He died in Rome on September 7, 1573. He was buried in the Aldobrandini Chapel of Santa Maria sopra Minerva.

Catholic Church titles
Preceded by Francesco Guarini (bishop)	Bishop of Imola; 1569–1573	Succeeded by Vincenzo Ercolani
Preceded by Francesco Crasso	Cardinal-Priest of Sant'Eufemia; 1570	Succeeded by Charles d'Angennes de Rambouillet
Preceded by Charles d'Angennes de Rambouillet	Cardinal-Priest of San Simeone Profeta; 1570–1573	Succeeded by Scipione Lancellotti
Preceded by Charles Borromeo	Major Penitentiary of the Apostolic Penitentiary; 1572–1573	Succeeded by Stanislaw Hosius
