= Silvestro Aldobrandini =

Florentine jurisconsult

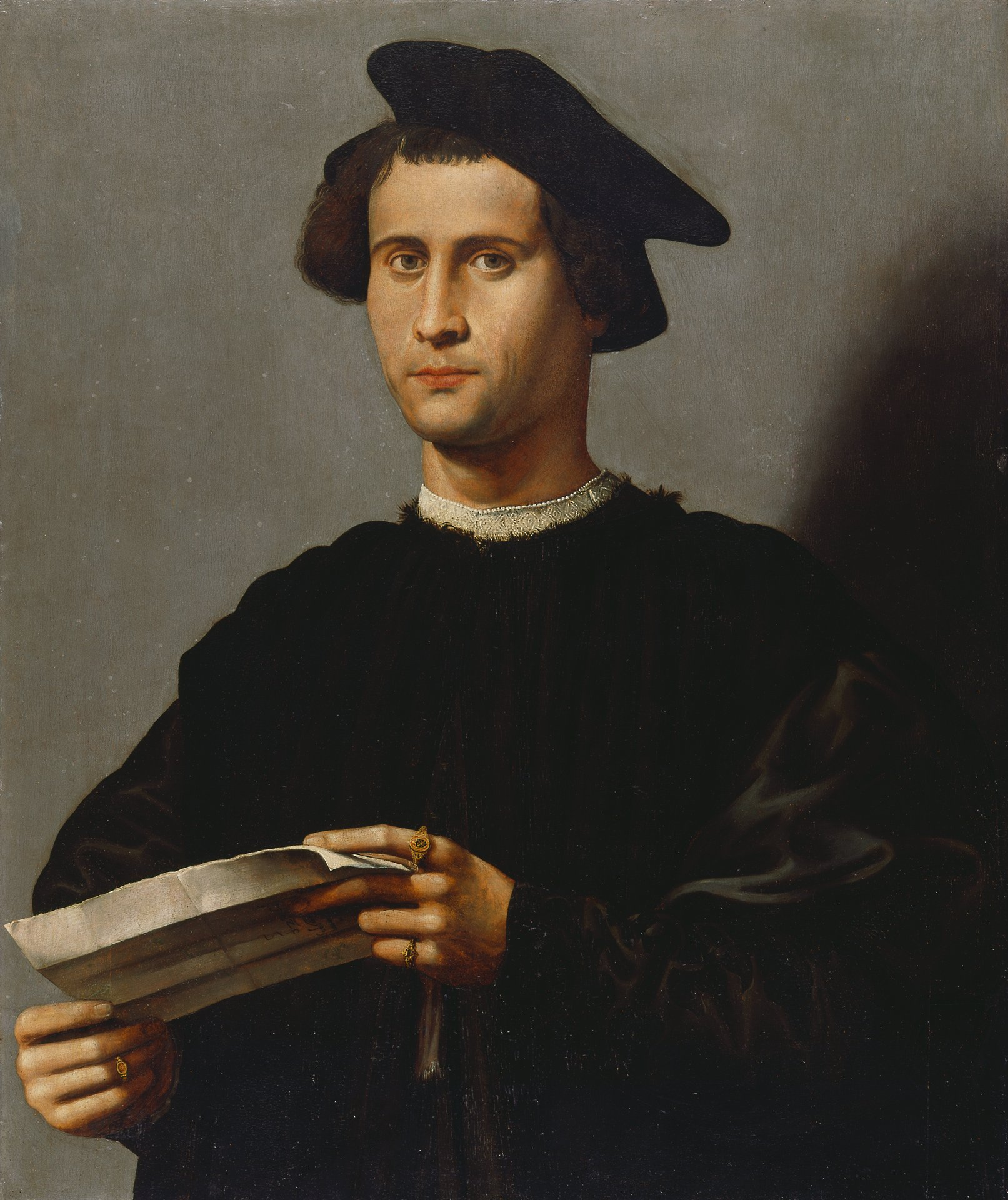
Portrait of a Lawyer in the Aldobrandini Family, said to be Silvestro Aldobrandini, by Ridolfo Ghirlandaio

Silvestro Aldobrandini (24 September 1499 –6 June 1558) was a Florentine jurisconsult and the father of Pope Clement VIII.

== Biography ==
He was son of Pietro Aldobrandini (17 August 1461 - 1522) and wife Lisa Flatri.

He married in 1520 Lisa Donati (? - 6 March 1557), daughter of Guido Donati and wife, and had:

- Cardinal Giovanni Aldobrandini
- Cardinal Ippolito Aldobrandini (Pope Clement VIII
- Pietro Aldobrandini (? - Rome, 11 February 1587), married Flaminia Ferracci (? - Rome, 27 April 1603), sister of lawyer Muzio Ferracci (parents of Olimpia Aldobrandini and Cardinal Pietro Aldobrandini)
- Bernardo Aldobrandini, married Livia Capizucchi
- Giulia or Elisabetta Aldobrandini, married Aurelio Personeni da Ca' Passero or Passeri, Doctor in Fine Arts and Medicine, son of Bernardino Passeri and wife (parents of Cardinal Cinzio Passeri Aldobrandini)

He died in Rome.

Silvestro Aldobrandini is depicted in a chapel named after Pope Sixtus V in the church of Santa Maria Maggiore in Rome.

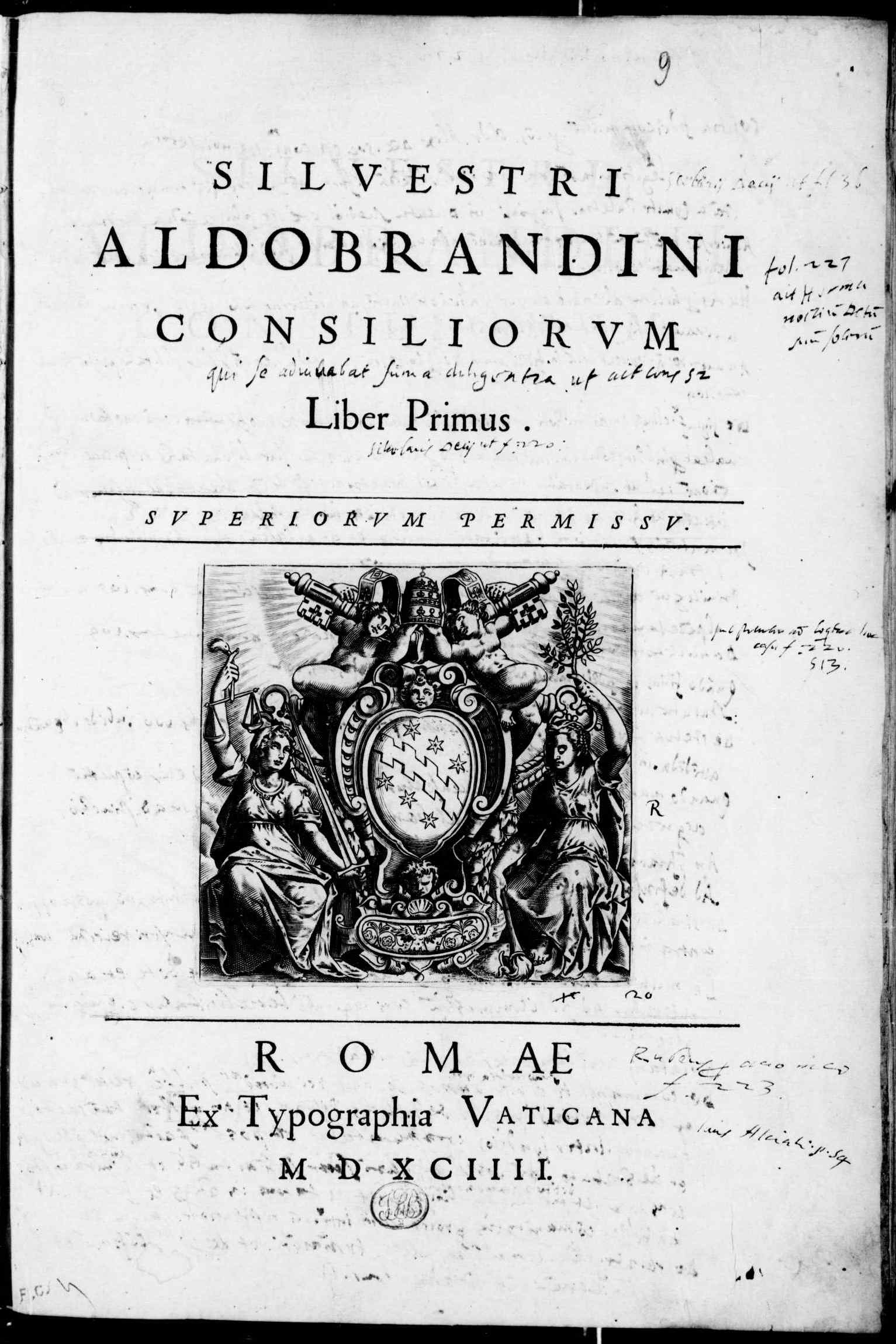
Consilia, 1594

== Works ==
- Institutiones iuris civilis : cum additionibus hactenus impressis (in Latin). Lyon: Vincent. 1546.
- Consilia (in Latin). Roma: Stamperia Vaticana. 1594.
