= Cardinals created by Clement VIII =

Catholic appointments from 1593 to 1604

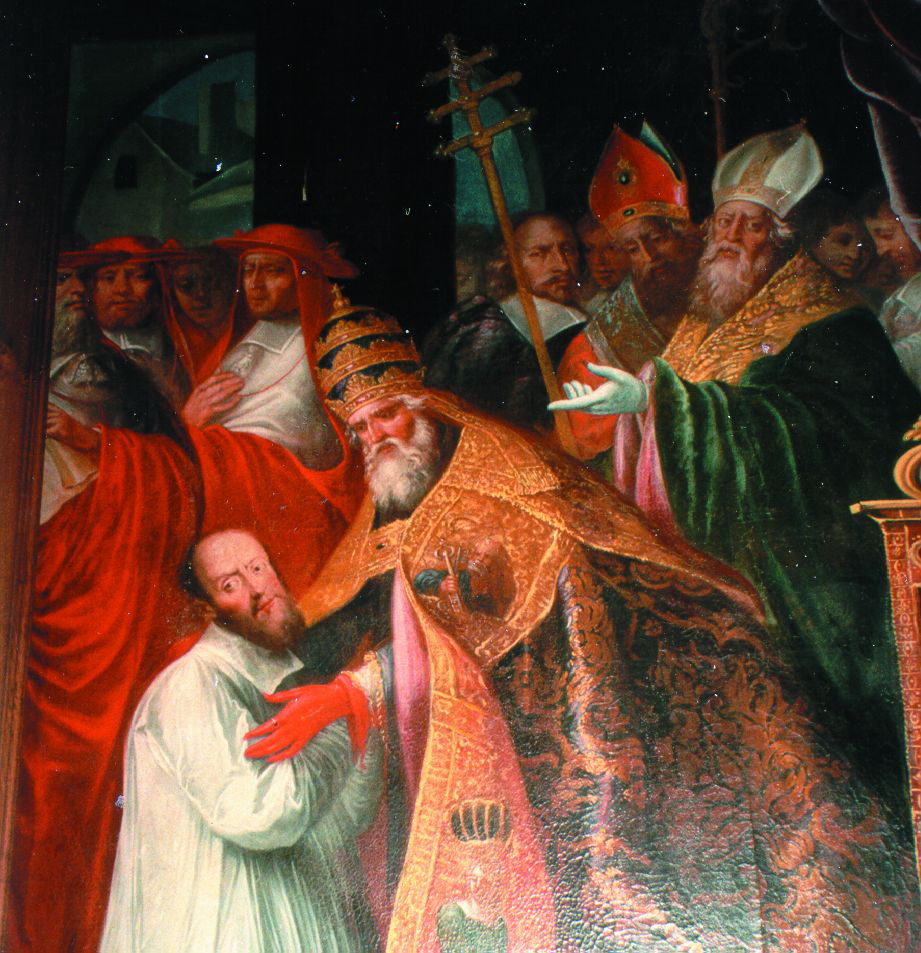
Pope Clement VIII (1536–1605) with Francis de Sales (1567–1622), with cardinals and bishops in the background

Pope Clement VIII (r. 1592–1605) created 53 cardinals in six consistories.

== 17 September 1593 ==
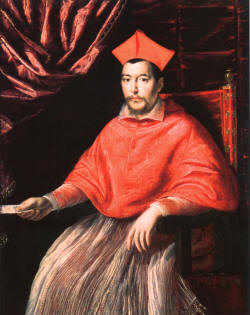
Pietro Aldobrandini (1571–1621), made a cardinal on 17 September 1593

1. Lucio Sassi - Cardinal Priest
2. Francisco de Toledo Herrera, S.J. - Cardinal Priest
3. Pietro Aldobrandini - Cardinal Bishop
4. Cinzio Passeri Aldobrandini - Cardinal Priest

== 5 June 1596 ==
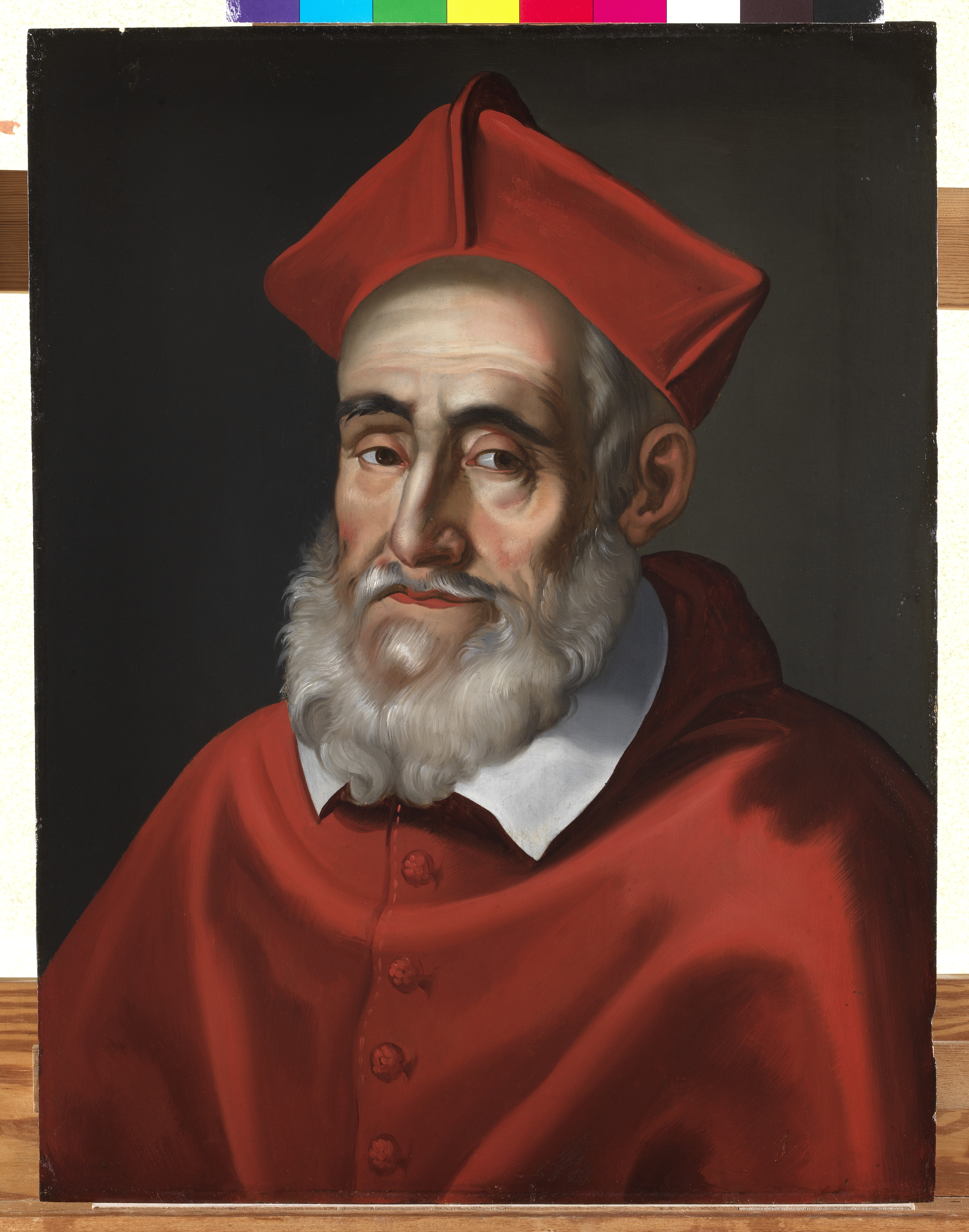
Caesar Baronius (1538–1607), made a cardinal on 5 June 1596

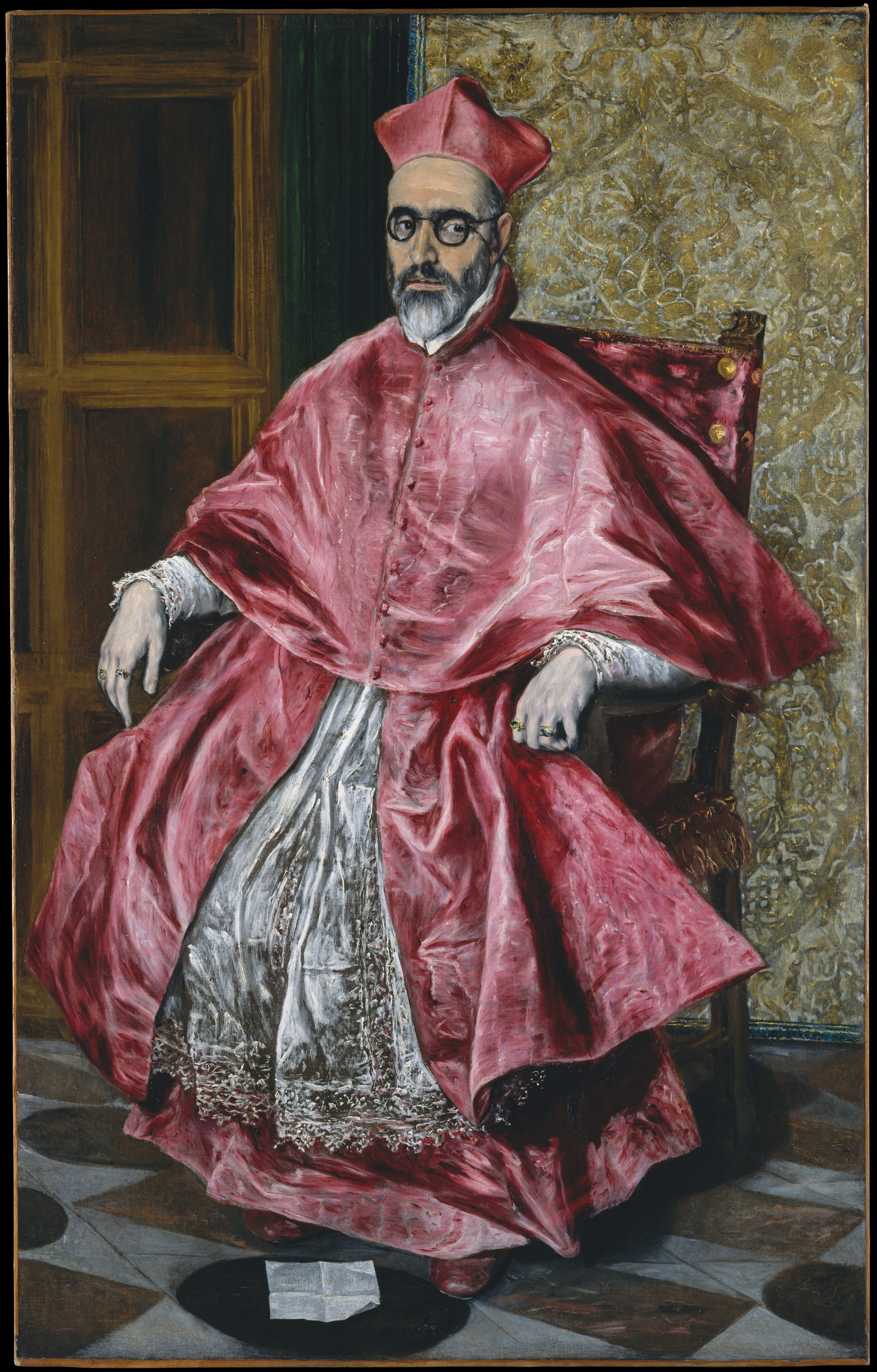
Fernando Niño de Guevara (1541–1609), made a cardinal on 5 June 1596

1. Silvio Savelli
2. Lorenzo Priuli
3. Francesco Maria Tarugi
4. Ottavio Bandini
5. Francesco Cornaro, iuniore
6. Anne d'Escars de Givry
7. Gian Francesco Biandrate di San Giorgio Aldobrandini
8. Camillo Borghese
9. Caesar Baronius
10. Lorenzo Bianchetti
11. Francisco de Ávila
12. Fernando Niño de Guevara
13. Bartolomeo Cesi
14. Francesco Mantica
15. Pompeio Arrigoni
16. Andrea Baroni Peretti Montalto

== 18 December 1596 ==
1. Philipp of Bavaria

== 3 March 1599 ==
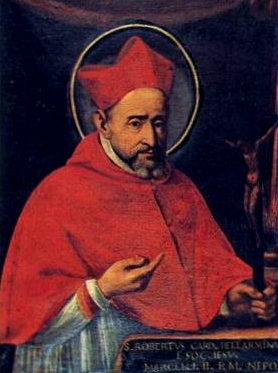
Robert Bellarmine (1542–1621), made a cardinal on 3 March 1599

1. Bonifazio Bevilacqua Aldobrandini - Cardinal Bishop
2. Bernardo de Sandoval y Rojas - Cardinal Priest
3. Alfonso Visconti - Cardinal Priest
4. Domenico Toschi - Cardinal Priest
5. Arnaud d'Ossat - Cardinal Priest
6. Paolo Emilio Zacchia - Cardinal Priest
7. Franz Seraph von Dietrichstein - Cardinal Priest
8. Silvio Antoniano - Cardinal Priest
9. S. Robert Francis Romulus Bellarmine, S.J. - Cardinal Priest
10. Bonviso Bonvisi - Cardinal Priest
11. François de Sourdis - Cardinal Deacon, then elevated to Cardinal Priest
12. Alessandro d'Este - Cardinal Priest
13. Giovanni Battista Deti - Cardinal Deacon, then elevated to Cardinal Priest, finally elevated to Cardinal Bishop

== 17 September 1603 ==
1. Silvestro Aldobrandini

== 9 June 1604 ==
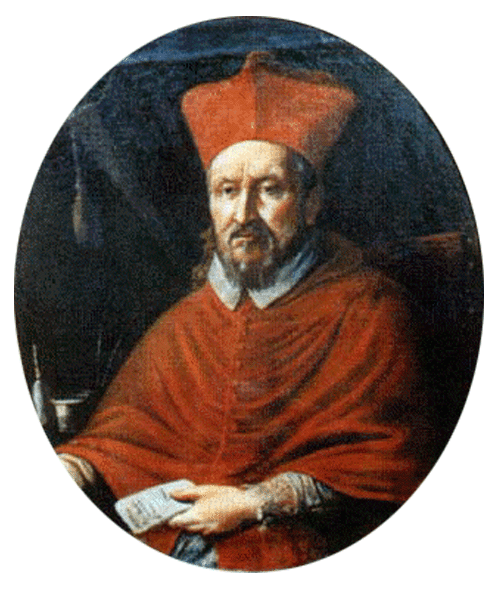
Domenico Ginnasi (1550–1639), made a cardinal on 9 June 1604

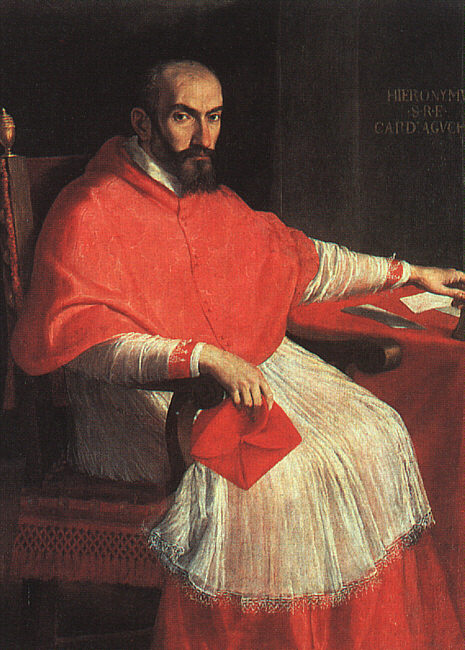
Girolamo Agucchi (1555–1605), made a cardinal on 9 June 1604

1. Séraphin Olivier-Razali
2. Domenico Ginnasi
3. Antonio Zapata y Cisneros
4. Filippo Spinelli
5. Carlo Conti
6. Bernard Maciejowski
7. Carlo Gaudenzio Madruzzo
8. Jacques Davy Duperron
9. Innocenzo del Bufalo-Cancellieri
10. Giovanni Delfino
11. Giacomo Sannesio
12. Erminio Valenti
13. Girolamo Agucchi
14. Girolamo Pamphilj
15. Ferdinando Taverna
16. Anselmo Marzato
17. Giovanni Doria
18. Carlo Emanuele Pio di Savoia
