= Ognissanti, Rome =

Church of All Saints
- Chiesa parrocchiale di Ognissanti
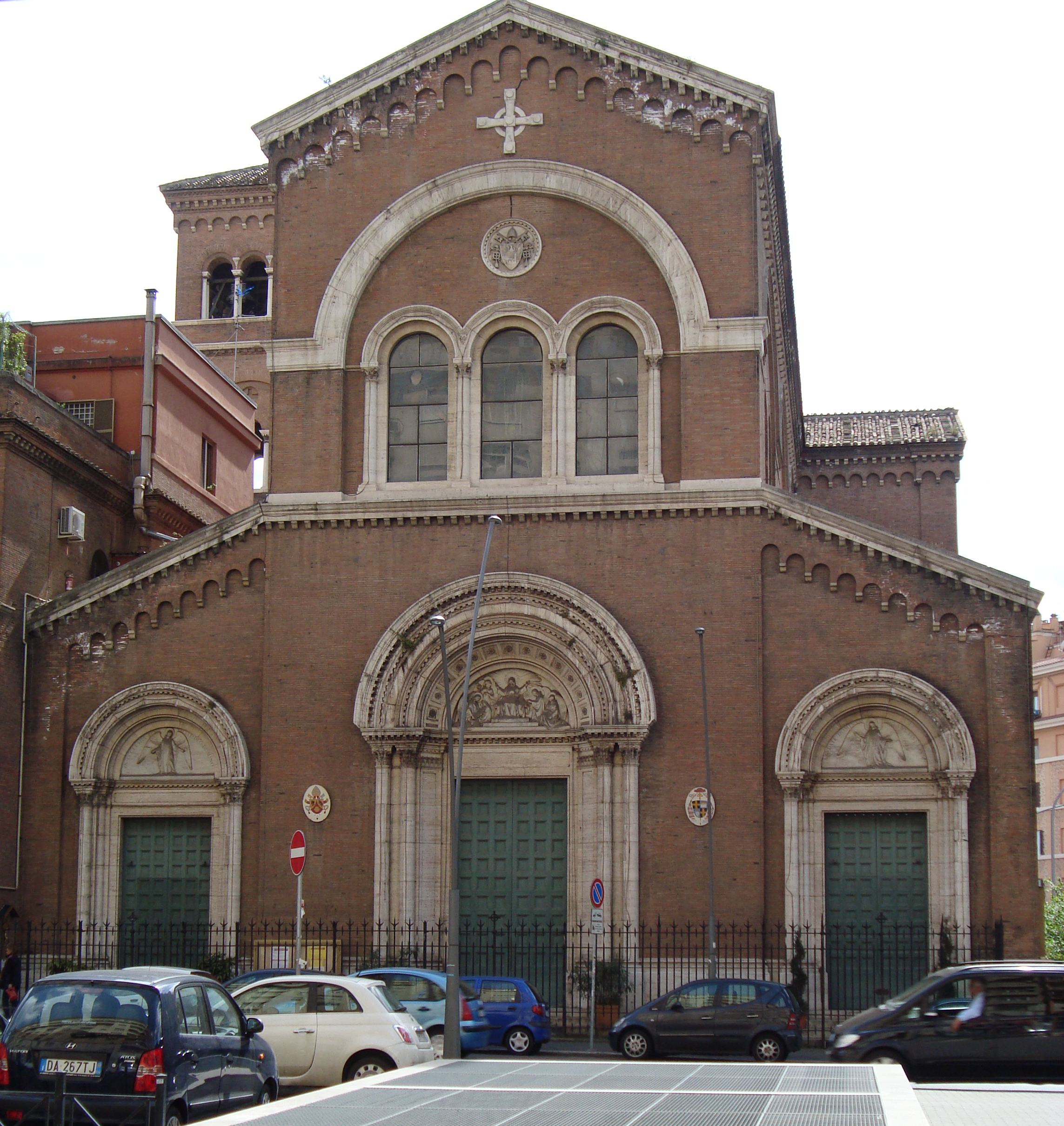
- Church of All Saints
- 41°52′48.0″N 12°30′57.0″E
- Location: Rome, 244 Via appia Nuova
- Country: Italy
- Denomination: Catholic, Roman Rite
- Religious institute: Figli della Divina Provvidenza

History
- Founder: Luigi Orione

Architecture
- Architect(s): Tullio Passarelli, Camillo Karl Schneider
- Groundbreaking: 29 June 1914
- Completed: 1920

Administration
- Deanery: Ognissanti in Via Appia Nuova
- Parish: Ognissanti

The Church of Ognissanti is a Catholic place of worship in Rome (Italy), located in the Quarter Q. IX Appio-Latino, along Via Appia Nuova, near Piazza Re di Roma; it is the seat of the homonymous parish entrusted to the Sons of Divine Providence.

The church houses the deaconry of "Ognissanti in Via Appia Nuova", established by Pope Paul VI in 1969.

== History ==
In 1908, Luigi Orione was assigned by Pope Pius X the task of evangelizing the area outside Porta San Giovanni, very poor at that time. There the priest built, as the center of pastoral life, a small chapel dedicated to All Saints: due to the increasing number of faithful, it was later replaced by a larger parish complex.

The construction of the church – designed by Tullio Passarelli and Camillo Karl Schneider – began on 29 June 1914, when, in the presence of the Cardinal Vicar Basilio Pompilj, the foundation stone was laid. The works continued until World War I, when they were interrupted to be resumed at the end of the conflict; the church was completed in 1920 and, on 31 October of the same year, consecrated by Giuseppe Palica, vicegerent archbishop. On 29 June 1927, in the presence of the same cardinal vicar, the blessing of the concert of five bells, located in the bell tower, took place.

The church was raised to parish by Pope Benedict XV with the bull Nihil Sedi Apostolicae on 4 November 1919, encompassing part of the territory of the parish of St John Lateran; the new boundaries were established by Cardinal Vicar Francesco Marchetti Selvaggiani with the decree Donec nova constituatur Paroecia on 16 January 1934.

In the years following its construction, the church underwent a series of restorations. The most important one was carried out from 1985 to 1991 and involved the presbyterial area: on this occasion, the furnishings installed during a refurbishment in 1975 were removed and new ones were made, in a more modern style.

On 7 March 1965, Pope Paul VI made a pastoral visit to the parish and celebrated Mass in Italian for the first time, using the first post-conciliar version of the Roman Rite, which involved the use of the vernacular only in some parts, while reserving the Latin to the others (including the Canon).

The parish also received the visits of the Popes John Paul II (3 March 1991) and Francis (7 March 2015, on the occasion of the fiftieth anniversary of the celebration of Paul VI). Angelo Giuseppe Roncalli, who in 1959 would become Pope with the name of John XXIII, visited the church and the parish complex privately, when he was still a priest, on 28 March 1921.

== Description ==
The exterior of the church is characterized by a tiered façade, which – like the rest of the building – shows a wall perimeter made of red bricks. In the upper part, in correspondence with the central nave, there is a large trifora inscribed in a round arch, while in the lower one there are three portals, each of which is surmounted by a lunette decorated with a marble bas-relief: the one in the center depicts the Glory of Mary, the lateral ones two Angels.

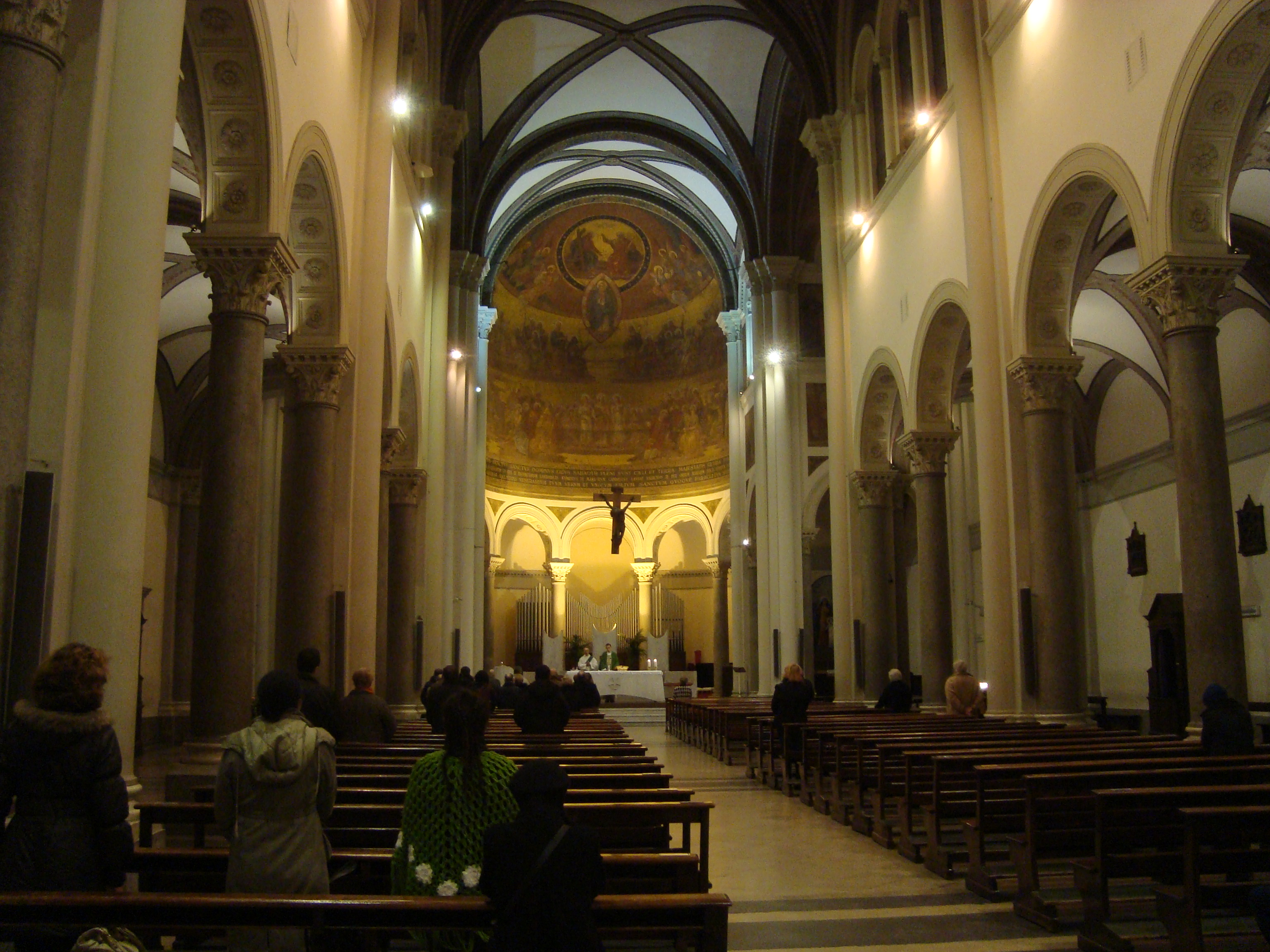
The interior of the church.

The church has a Latin cross plant, with a slightly protruding transept and an hall divided into three naves by two rows of round arches resting on columns alternating with granite pillars; the ceiling is cross-vaulted.
In the right nave there is a marble group, donated by Pope Pius XI, representing the Pietà; above there is a plaque recalling that in this church Pope Paul VI celebrated mass in Italian for the first time, following the liturgical reform of Vatican Council II.

In the central nave there are stained glass windows depicting various saints, including John Bosco, while three other ones in the counter-façade represent Mary Immaculate appearing in Lourdes (holding a rosary) and at its sides the saints Pius X (a personal friend of the founder of the Orionine Fathers as well as a great benefactor of the Order) and don Orione. Other saints – including Philip Neri and the martyr Lawrence – are frescoed in the chapels at the end of the side naves.

The central nave ends, beyond the transept, with the semicircular apse, crowned by an ambulatory that houses the pipe organ, built in 1965 by the Pinchi company (it has an electric transmission with multiple system, 18 stops on two manuals and a pedalboard); the upper part is decorated with a mosaic depicting the Trinity, Mary Immaculate and All Saints by Silvio Galimberti (1920).

== Cardinal-Deacons ==
- Giuseppe Paupini (30 April 1969 – 18 July 1992 (pro hac vice Title, from 30 June 1979)
- Mikel Koliqi (26 November 1994 – 28 January 1997)
- Alberto Bovone (21 February 1998 – 17 April 1998)
- Walter Kasper (21 February 2001 – present (pro hac vice Title from 2011)

== Bibliography ==
- Claudio Rendina (2000). Le chiese di Roma. Milan: Newton & Compton Editori. ISBN 978-88-541-0931-5.
- Massimo Alemanno (2004). Le chiese di Roma Moderna. Vol. III. Rome: Armando Editore. ISBN 978-88-6081-147-9.
- various (2006). I quartieri di Roma. Rome: Newton & Compton Editori. ISBN 978-88-541-0594-2.
- Graziano Fronzuto (2007). Organi di Roma. Guida pratica orientativa agli organi storici e moderni. Florence: Leo S. Olschki Editore. ISBN 978-88-222-5674-4.
- John XXIII; Loris Francesco Capovilla (2014). Il giornale dell'anima e altri scritti di pietà. Cinisello Balsamo: Edizioni San Paolo. ISBN 978-88-21-54224-4.
