= Apostolic Penitentiary =

One of the three tribunals of the Roman Curia

Current logo of the Apostolic Penitentiary

The Apostolic Penitentiary (Latin: Paenitentiaria Apostolica), formerly called the Supreme Tribunal of the Apostolic Penitentiary, is a dicastery led by the major penitentiary of the Roman Curia and is one of the three ordinary tribunals of the Holy See. The Apostolic Penitentiary is chiefly a tribunal of mercy, responsible for issues relating to the forgiveness of sins in the Catholic Church.

The Apostolic Penitentiary has jurisdiction only over matters in the internal forum. Its work falls mainly into these categories:

- the absolution of excommunications latæ sententiæ reserved to the Holy See
- the dispensation of sacramental impediments reserved to the Holy See
- the issuance and governance of indulgences.

The head of the Apostolic Penitentiary is one of the few Vatican officials who retain their positions sede vacante (the other being the camerlengo of the Holy Roman Church). If the major penitentiary is a cardinal elector he is one of only three persons in the conclave allowed to communicate with those outside the conclave, so that he can continue to fulfill his duties (the other two being the cardinal vicar of Rome and the vicar general for the Vatican City State). The Major Penitentiary is a titular archbishop and is normally a cardinal. Since 6 April 2024, the major penitentiary is Cardinal Angelo De Donatis. The second-highest-ranking official in the Apostolic Penitentiary, the regent, is bishop Krzysztof Józef Nykiel.

== History ==
During the Middle Ages, the Apostolic Penitentiary had two major functions. The officium minus related to the spiritual care of Christians, and the ability to listen to confessions and absolve sins of grave nature, whose absolving was reserved to the Pope. The officium maius related to the power to grant grace to those who petitioned the Pope in relation to: (1) absolution for breaking the regulations of canon law; (2) dispensations to act against Church regulations; (3) licenses not to observe ecclesiastical norms regarding the exercise of the Catholic faith; and (4) official declarations. The Penitentiary developed around the 12th century, with its powers gradually increasing and being expanded by subsequent popes.

== Absolutions and dispensations ==
Normally confessions of sins are handled at the local level by priests and their bishops and are not heard by the tribunal. The work of the Apostolic Penitentiary involves grave sins, such as defiling the Eucharist, which are reserved to the Holy See. In late 2006, then Major Penitentiary Cardinal Stafford said this offense is occurring with more and more frequency, by ordinary faithful who receive Communion and then spit it out or otherwise desecrate it.

== Indulgences ==
The Apostolic Penitentiary also specifies actions for which indulgences are granted, either permanently (in the Enchiridion Indulgentiarum), or on special occasions, such as the Year for Priests (19 June 2009 to 19 June 2010), during which a plenary indulgence is granted, on 19 June 2009, on first Thursdays, on 4 August 2009 (150th anniversary of the death of Jean-Marie Vianney), and on 19 June 2010, to all the faithful who attend Mass, pray for priests to Jesus Christ the Eternal High Priest, offer any other good work they do that day, and satisfy the conditions for any plenary indulgence (detachment from all sins, the Sacrament of Penance within the last or next couple of weeks, holy communion (Eucharist in the Catholic Church), and praying for the Pope's intentions). There are also adaptations for those unable to go to church, and daily indulgences available only to priests.

=== Misericordiae vultus ===
In the Papal Bull Misericordiae Vultus (Latin: "The Face of Mercy"), Pope Francis decreed that the Church would observe a Special Jubilee Year of Mercy lasting from the Solemnity of the Immaculate Conception of the Blessed Virgin Mary (a Holy Day of Obligation) on Tuesday, December 8, 2015, until the Solemnity of the Feast of Christ the King of the Universe on the last Sunday before Advent, in November 2016. For this, he allowed certain qualified priests to serve as "Missionaries of Mercy" to each Diocese, with the faculties to absolve even sins that are reserved to the Holy See through the Apostolic Penitentiary. Normally, a priest or even a bishop would not be able to do this unless the person was in danger of imminent death. The Pope has the power, as the earthly absolute sovereign of the Catholic Church, to make this special change for the year.

== List of major penitentiaries ==
=== 1216–1405 ===
- Nicola de Romanis (1216–1219)
- Tommaso da Capua (1219–1239)
- Bishop Guglielmo di Modena, O. Cart. (1244–1251)
- Hugh of Saint-Cher (ca.1256–1263)
- Gui Foucault (1263–1265)
- Henry of Susa (1266–1271)
- Pierre de Tarentaise (1273–1276)
- (1276–1279 – probably vacant)
- Bentivenga de Bentivengis (1279–1289)
- Matteo di Aquasparta (1289–1302)
- Gentile Partino (1302–1305)
- Berengar Fredol (1306–1323)
- Gauscelin de Jean (ca.1327–1348)
- Etienne Aubert (1348–1352)
- Egidio Albornoz (1352–1367)
  - Francesco degli Atti (substitute penitentiary c. 1353–1361)
- Guillaume Bragose (substitute penitentiary 1361–1367, grand penitentiary 1367)
  - Galhardus de Boscoviridi (regent of the Apostolic Penitentiary 1367–1369)
- Etienne de Poissy (1369–1373)
- Jean du Cros (1373–1378)
  - Giovanni d'Amelia (regent of the Apostolic Penitentiary 1378)
- Eleazario da Sabrano (1378–1379)
  - Augustin de Lanzano (regent of the Apostolic Penitentiary 1379–1382)
- Luca Rodolfucci de Gentili (1382–1388)
  - Augustin de Lanzano (regent of the Apostolic Penitentiary 1388–1389)
- Niccolo Caracciolo Moschino (1389)
- Francesco Carbone Tomacelli (1389–1405)

=== 1405–1899 ===
- Antonio Caetani (1405–1412)
- Pierre Girard (1409–1415)
- Giovanni Dominici (1408–1415)
- Giordano Orsini (1415–1438)
- Niccolo Albergati (1438–1443)
- Giuliano Cesarini (1444)
- Giovanni Berardi (1444–1449)
- Domenico Capranica (1449–1458)
- Filippo Calandrini (1459–1476)
- Giuliano della Rovere (1476–1503)
- Pedro Luis de Borja-Lanzol de Romaní (1503–1511)
- Leonardo Grosso della Rovere (1511–1520)
- Lorenzo Pucci (1520–1529)
- Antonio Pucci (1529–1544)
- Roberto Pucci (1545–1547)
- Ranuccio Farnese, O. S. Io. Hieros. (1547–1565)
- Carlo Borromeo (1565–1572)
- Giovanni Aldobrandini (1572–1573)
- Stanisław Hozjusz (1574–1579)
- Filippo Boncompagni (1579–1586)
- Ippolito Aldobrandini (1586–1592)
- Giulio Antonio Santori (1592–1602)
- Pietro Aldobrandini (1602–1605)
- Cinzio Passeri Aldobrandini (1605–1610)
- Scipione Borghese (1610–1633)
- Antonio Marcello Barberini, O.F.M.Cap. (1633–1646)
- Orazio Giustiniani, Orat. (1647–1649)
- Niccolò Albergati-Ludovisi (1650–1687)
- Leandro Colloredo, Orat. (1688–1709)
- Fabrizio Paolucci, pro-penitentiary (1709–1710); penitentiary (1710–1721)
- Bernardo Maria Conti, O.S.B.Cas. (1721–1730)
- Vincenzo Petra, pro-penitentiary (1730); penitentiary (1730–1747)
- Gioacchino Besozzi, O.Cist. (1747–1755)
- Antonio Andrea Galli, C.R.SS.S. (1755–1767)
- Giovanni Carlo Boschi (1767–1788)
- Francesco Saverio Zelada (1788–1801)
- Leonardo Antonelli (1801–1811)
- Michele di Pietro (1811–1821)
- Francesco Saverio Castiglioni (1821–1829) who was elected Pope Pius VIII
- Emmanuele de Gregorio (1829–1839)
- Castruccio Castracane degli Antelminelli (1839–1852)
- Gabriele Ferretti (1852–1860)
- Antonio Maria Cagiano de Azevedo (1860–1867)
- Antonio Maria Panebianco, O.F.M.Conv. (1867–1877)
- Luigi Bilio, C.R.S.P. (1877–1884)
- Raffaele Monaco La Valletta (1884–1896)
- Isidoro Verga (1896–1899)

=== 1899–present ===
- Serafino Vannutelli (20 November 1899 – 19 August 1915)
- Willem Marinus van Rossum, CSSR (1 October 1915 - 12 March 1918)
- Oreste Giorgi (12 March 1918 – 30 December 1924)
- Andreas Franz Frühwirth, O.P. (8 January 1925 – 31 July 1927)
- Lorenzo Lauri (31 July 1927 – 8 October 1941)
- Nicola Canali (15 October 1941 – 3 August 1961)
- Arcadio Larraona Saralegui, C.M.F. (13 August 1961 – 2 February 1962)
- Fernando Cento (12 February 1962 – 7 April 1967)
- Giuseppe Ferretto (7 April 1967 – 1 March 1973)
- Giuseppe Paupini (21 March 1973 – 8 April 1984)
- Luigi Dadaglio (Pro-Major Penitentiary: 8 April 1984 – 27 May 1985; Major Penitentiary: 27 May 1985 – 6 April 1990)
- William Wakefield Baum (6 April 1990 – 22 November 2001)
- Luigi De Magistris (Pro-Major Penitentiary: 22 November 2001 – 4 October 2003)
- James Francis Stafford (4 October 2003 – 2 June 2009)
- Fortunato Baldelli (2 June 2009 – 5 January 2012)
- Manuel Monteiro de Castro (5 January 2012 – 21 September 2013)
- Mauro Piacenza (21 September 2013 – 6 April 2024)
- Angelo De Donatis (6 April 2024 - current)
