= Mikel Koliqi =

Albanian Roman Catholic cardinal

His Eminence Mikel Koliqi
- Cardinal-Deacon of Ognissanti in Via Appia Nuova
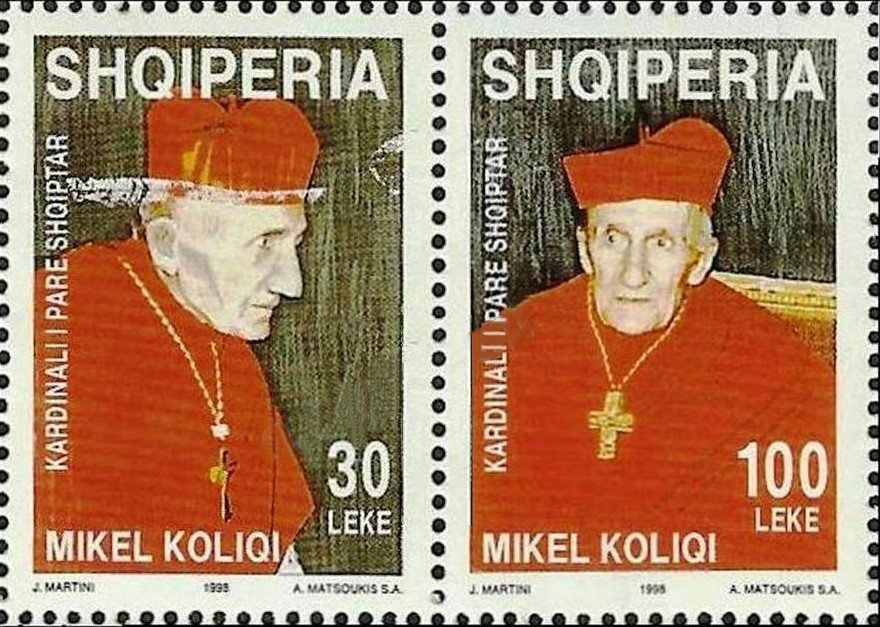
- Mikel Koliqi on a 1998 stamp from Albania
- Church: Roman Catholic
- Appointed: 26 November 1994
- In office: 1994-1997
- Predecessor: Giuseppe Paupini
- Successor: Alberto Bovone

Orders
- Ordination: 30 May 1931
- Created cardinal: 26 November 1994 by John Paul II
- Rank: Cardinal-Deacon

Personal details
- Born: 29 September 1902 Shkodër, Scutari Vilayet, Ottoman Empire
- Died: 28 January 1997 (aged 94) Shkodër, Albania
- Buried: Shkodër Cathedral

Mikel Koliqi (29 September 1902 – 28 January 1997) was an Albanian cardinal of the Roman Catholic Church. He was born and died in Shkodër (Shkodra), Albania. He was imprisoned for 38 years by Albania's government.

== Life ==
Mikel Koliqi was born on 29 September 1902 in Shkodër, Albania. His brother Ernest Koliqi (1903–1974) was a prominent writer, translator, and politician, who spent most of his career in Rome. Mikel was educated locally by the Jesuits who sent him to study at the Jesuits' Istituto Cesare Arici in Brescia, Italy. He studied mechanical engineering at Milan Polytechnic, but interrupted that course of study when he discovered his vocation and prepared for the priesthood. He returned to Albania and was ordained a priest of the Archdiocese of Shkodër on 30 May 1931. He served as assistant parish priest and then parish priest at the cathedral parish and in 1936 became vicar general of the Archdiocese. As a young priest he was involved in youth work and founded the Cathedral School. He published a weekly newspaper Kumbona e së Dieles and wrote musical works for the stage. He led a church music group as well.

Between 1936 and 1938, he also composed the scores to three melodramas, theatre pieces in which orchestral passages accompany spoken texts and which occasionally incorporate song: Rasafa, The Siege of Shkodër, and The Red Scarf. They are deemed early precursors of the Albanian opera tradition.

The new Communist regime that came to power in Albania at the end of World War II had him arrested in February 1945 as part of a general suppression of religious activity. He spent the next five years in prison, much of it in solitary confinement, and was then transferred to a labor camp where he performed field work and worked in rural construction. When Albania outlawed religion in 1967, he was arrested once more. Convicted on charges of listening to foreign broadcasts, proselytizing young people, and promoting anti-Communist sentiment, he was sentenced to fifteen years. He continued to work as a priest in secret until the ban was lifted in 1990. By the time of his release from prison in 1986 under a general amnesty he had spent 38 years in the prison camps at Lushnjë, Kuç, Kurveleshë, and Gjazë. He was the oldest of the 30 or so Catholic priests who survived the Communist persecutions in Albania.

As the Vatican re-established contact with the Catholics of Albania, Koliqi may a rare trip outside his home to attend a Mass celebrated by Claudio Maria Celli, an official of the Holy See's Secretariat of State, in the cathedral of Shkodër on 21 March 1991.

Pope John Paul II sent him greetings on his 90th birthday and when he visited Albania on 25 April 1993, he visited Koliqi and embraced him. They had a long discussion of his years of persecution, speaking together in Italian.

Pope John Paul made him a cardinal at the age of 92 on 6 November 1994, one of several new cardinals who had suffered under Communist persecution. Koliqi was assigned him the deaconry of Ognissanti in via Appia Nuova. He was the first cardinal from Albania.

He lived his final years with relatives in his home town. He termed the consistory where he was made a cardinal the "highlight" of his life.

He died on 28 January 1997 and is buried in the crypt of Shkodër's cathedral.

Pope John Paul paid him tribute: "Imprisoned and prevented for long years in the exercise of his priestly mission, he, as a solid oaktree, never became intimidated, becoming a shining example of trust in Divine Providence as well as constant fidelity to the See of Peter."

Late in life he received a series of awards from the government of Albania, including the title "Torch of Democracy", "Mother Teresa", and "Honor of the Nation".

== See also ==
- Cardinals created by John Paul II

Catholic Church titles
Preceded by Giuseppe Paupini as Cardinal-priest pro hac vice	Cardinal-Deacon of Ognissanti in Via Appia Nuova; 1994–1997	Succeeded by Alberto Bovone
