= Francesco Guarini (bishop) =

Most Reverend Francesco Guarini
- Bishop of Imola
- Church: Catholic Church
- Diocese: Diocese of Imola
- In office: 1561–1569
- Predecessor: Vitellozzo Vitelli (cardinal)
- Successor: Giovanni Aldobrandini

Personal details
- Died: 1569 Imola, Italy

Francesco Guarini (died 1569) was a Roman Catholic prelate who served as Bishop of Imola (1561–1569).

== Biography ==
On 24 Oct 1561, Francesco Guarini was appointed during the papacy of Pope Pius IV as Bishop of Imola. He served as Bishop of Imola until his death in 1569.

== External links and additional sources ==
- Cheney, David M. "Diocese of Imola". Catholic-Hierarchy.org. (for Chronology of Bishops) ^{[self-published]}
- Chow, Gabriel. "Diocese of Imola (Italy)". GCatholic.org. (for Chronology of Bishops) ^{[self-published]}

Catholic Church titles
Preceded by Vitellozzo Vitelli (cardinal)	Bishop of Imola; 1561–1569	Succeeded by Giovanni Aldobrandini
