= Ippolito Aldobrandini (cardinal) =

Catholic cardinal

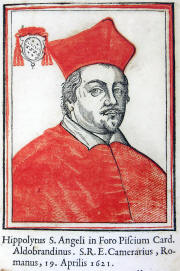
Ippolito Aldobrandini

Ippolito Aldobrandini (1592 – 19 July 1638) was a Catholic Cardinal. Pope Clement VIII, whose birth name was also Ippolito Aldobrandini, was his great-uncle.

== Life ==
He was a son of distant cousins Gianfrancesco Aldobrandini, prince of Meldola and Sarsina, and Olimpia Aldobrandini, niece of Pope Clement VIII. In 1593, at the invitation of the pope, his parents moved to Rome. Ippolito's elder sister Margherita became the Duchess of Parma.

At the consistory of April 1621, Gregory XV named him a cardinal with the title cardinal-deacon of S. Maria Nuova; in 1626 he opted for S. Angelo in Pescheria; and Sant'Eustachio in 1634.

He served as Camerlengo of the Holy Roman Church from 1623 to 1638. He participated in the 1623 papal conclave that resulted in the election of Maffeo Barberini as Pope Urban VIII.

== Patron of the arts ==
Ippolito was a patron of the arts in his own right, and employed the Baroque composer Domenico Mazzocchi, who entered his service in 1621. He was also a patron of Domenichino, who stayed at the Villa Aldobrandini in Frascati during the summer of 1634.

His maternal uncle, Cardinal Pietro Aldobrandini was papal legate to Ferrara and a noted patron of the arts, whose collection expanded with the d’Este treasures when Alfonso II d'Este, Duke of Ferrara died without heirs in 1597, and the Duchy of Ferrara became part of the Papal States. Cardinal Pietro left his estate to his sister, Olimpia. With her death in 1637, it passed to her eldest surviving son, Cardinal Ippolito, including the Villa Aldobrandini on the Quirinal. When the cardinal died the following year, the estate went to his niece, Olimpia Aldobrandini, the sole heiress to the family fortune. With her marriage to Camillo Francesco Maria Pamphili, the estates and property passed to the Pamphili family and became the nucleus for the Doria Pamphilj Gallery.

Cardinal Aldobrandini died at the age of 42, on July 19, 1638, and was interred at Santa Maria sopra Minerva.
