= Giuseppe Ferretto =

Italian Cardinal

His Eminence Giuseppe Antonio Ferretto
- Major Penitentiary Emeritus of the Apostolic Penitentiary
- Church: Roman Catholic Church
- Appointed: 7 April 1967
- Term ended: 1 March 1973
- Predecessor: Fernando Cento
- Successor: Giuseppe Paupini
- Other post: Cardinal-Bishop of Sabina e Poggio Mirteto (1961–73)
- Previous posts: Assessor of the Consistorial Congregation (1950–61); Secretary of the Commission of Cardinals for the Shrine of Pompeii (1952–60); Secretary of the Pontifical Commission for Latin America (1958–60); Titular Archbishop of Serdica (1958–61); Secretary of the College of Cardinals (1959–61); Cardinal-Priest of Santa Croce in Gerusalemme (1961); Camerlengo of the College of Cardinals (1968–73)

Orders
- Ordination: 24 February 1923
- Consecration: 27 December 1958 by Pope John XXIII
- Created cardinal: 16 January 1961 by Pope John XXIII
- Rank: Cardinal-Priest (1961); Cardinal-Bishop (1961–73)

Personal details
- Born: Giuseppe Antonio Ferretto; 9 March 1899 Rome, Kingdom of Italy
- Died: 17 March 1973 (aged 74) Rome, Italy
- Buried: Chiesa di Immacolata e San Benedetto Giuseppe Labre a Via Taranto
- Parents: Tommaso Ferretto; Adele Stazi
- Education: Pontifical Roman Seminary; Pontifical Lateran University
- Motto: Fortis in fide
- Coat of arms

Styles of Giuseppe Ferretto
- Reference style: His Eminence
- Spoken style: Your Eminence
- Informal style: Cardinal
- See: Sabina e Poggio Mirteto (suburbicarian)

Giuseppe Antonio Ferretto (9 March 1899 – 17 March 1973) was an Italian Cardinal of the Roman Catholic Church who served as Major Penitentiary in the Roman Curia from 1967 to 1973, and was elevated to the rank of cardinal in 1961.

== Biography ==
Ferretto was born in Rome to Tommaso and Adele (née Stazi) Ferretto. He studied at the Pontifical Roman Seminary (minor and major branches), the Pontifical Lateran University (where he obtained his doctorates in theology and canon and civil law), and the Pontifical Institute of Christian Archeology in Rome. Ordained to the priesthood on 24 February 1923, Ferretto finished his studies in 1926 and then taught at the Pontifical Lateran University and the Pontifical Urbaniana University until 1958. He served as an official in the Vicariate of Rome from 1929 to 1939, when he was made a referendary of the Apostolic Signatura on 23 April. Before becoming a canon of St. Peter's Basilica on 1 May 1953, he was named substitute (7 June 1943) and later assessor (27 June 1950) of the Sacred Consistorial Congregation.

He was also a noted archaeologist.

On 14 December 1958, Ferretto was appointed Titular Archbishop of Serdica by Pope John XXIII. He received his episcopal consecration in St. Peter's Basilica on the following 27 December from Pope John, with Bishops Girolamo Bortignon, OFM Cap and Gioacchino Muccin serving as co-consecrators. Ferretto was named Secretary of the College of Cardinals on 20 January 1959.

He was created Cardinal-Priest of Santa Croce in Gerusalemme by Pope John in the consistory of 16 January 1961. There had been speculation that he had been one of the cardinals appointed in pectore on 28 March 1960, but his precedence in the College of Cardinals did not reflect such an appointment.

Ferretto was named Cardinal Bishop of Sabina e Poggio Mirteto on 26 March 1961. Pope John had recently changed the way cardinals were raised to the rank of cardinal bishop. Previously, the senior cardinal deacon and the senior cardinal priest had the right to opt for the title of cardinal bishop when one of the sees assigned to a cardinal bishop became vacant. Pope John made the appointment the prerogative of the pope. While the older method had ensured that only senior clerics of advanced age held the title of cardinal bishop, Pope John's first appointment under the new rule was Ferretto, who had just turned 62. A cardinal for just two months, he was the lowest ranking member of the order of cardinal priests.

He attended the Second Vatican Council from 1962 to 1965. He participated in the 1963 papal conclave, where he was also thought to be a possible candidate for election to the papacy. He was appointed Major Penitentiary on 7 April 1967. Pope Paul named him a participant in the first post-Vatican II Synod of Bishops in 1967. On 1 March 1973, he resigned as Major Penitentiary.

Ferretto died on 17 March 1973 in Rome, at age 74. He had been suffering from a heart condition. He is buried in the church of Immacolata e S. Benedetto Giuseppe Labre a via Taranto.

Catholic Church titles
Preceded by Luigi Sincero	Secretary of the College of Cardinals; 1959–1961	Succeeded by Francesco Carpino
Preceded by Fernando Cento	Major Penitentiary; 1967–1973	Succeeded by Giuseppe Paupini
