= Krzysztof Józef Nykiel =

Polish Bishop

Krzysztof Nykiel
- Titular Bishop of Velia
- Appointed: 1 May 2024
- Other post: Regent of the Apostolic Penitentiary

Orders
- Ordination: 9 June 1990 by Władysław Ziółek
- Consecration: 22 June 2024 by Mauro Piacenza

Personal details
- Born: 28 February 1965 (age 61) Osjaków, Polish People's Republic
- Motto: Patris Corde; (With a Father's Heart)
- Coat of arms

Krzysztof Jozef Nykiel (born 28 February 1965) is the regent of the Apostolic Penitentiary, who was appointed to the position by Pope Benedict XVI on 26 June 2012. He had previously served as an official of the Congregation for the Doctrine of the Faith.

Nykiel was born in Osjaków, Poland, in 1965. He was a student of the major seminary in Łódź in 1984, he received the title of "Master [(Polish: Magister)] in Theology" at the Theological Academy in Warsaw in 1990. He was ordained to the priesthood on 9 June 1990 for the Archdiocese of Łódź. After pastoral work he was sent to Rome and served as an official of the Pontifical Council for Health Care from 1995 to 2002. During this time in Rome he studied for and received his doctorate in canon law from the Pontifical Gregorian University in 2001. He was created Chaplain of His Holiness in 2001 and Prelate of Honour of His Holiness in 2010.

From 1 July 2002 he served as an official of the Congregation for the Doctrine of the Faith. He served as an Adjunct Secretary of the International Commission of Inquiry on Medjugorje from 18 December 2009. He also served as a member of the College of Prelate Clerics of the Apostolic Camera from 30 December 2010 and from 5 January 2011 serves as a consultant to the Pontifical Council for Health Care Workers. He says of his role as regent of the Apostolic Penitentiary: "We are right to call it the Mercifulness Tribunal because its main mission is helping people in the process of reconciliation with God and with the Church, who are in a situation impossible to reconcile with their eternal salvation."

He carries out pastoral Passoscuro in the Diocese of Porto-Santa Rufina. He was postulator process of beatification and canonization of the Venerable Servant of God Wanda N. Malczewska and Sister Maria Julitta Ritz.

He knows the Polish language, Latin, Italian, English, German, Spanish and Russian.

He has spoken in praise of Pope Francis, crediting the pontiff with getting more Catholics to attend confession.

On 1 May 2024 he was appointed Titular Bishop of Velia and will be consecrated at a later date.

Preceded by Gianfranco Girotti, OFM Conv	Regent of the Apostolic Penitentiary; 26 June 2012–present	Succeeded by incumbent
