= Cinzio Aldobrandini =

Italian cardinal

His Eminence Cinzio Aldobrandini
- Cardinal-Priest of San Pietro in Vincoli
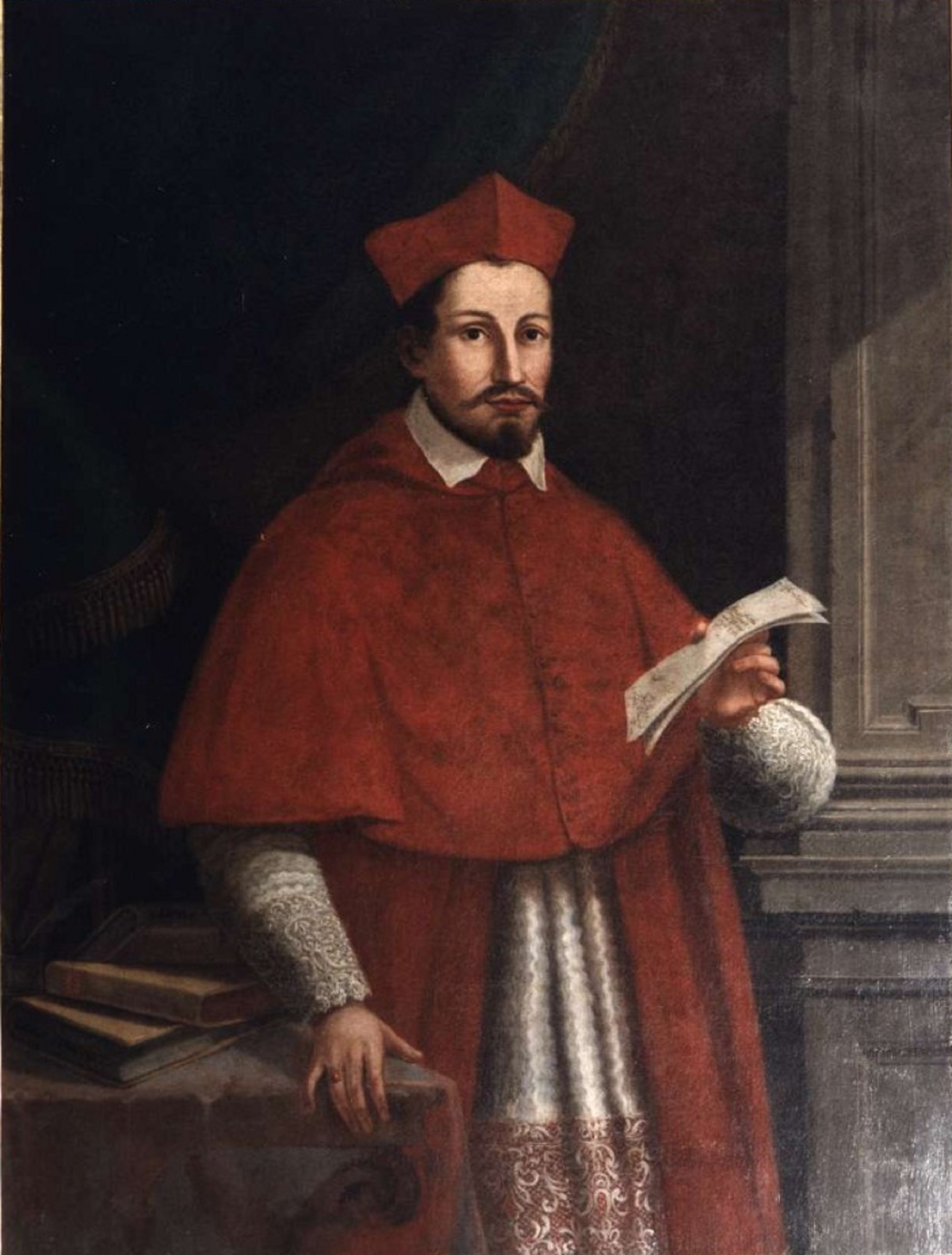
- Church: Catholic Church
- Appointed: 1 June 1605
- Term ended: 1 January 1610
- Predecessor: Girolamo Agucchi
- Successor: Lanfranco Margotti
- Previous posts: Cardinal-Deacon of San Giorgio in Velabro (1693–1705)

Orders
- Created cardinal: 17 September 1593 by Pope Clement VIII
- Rank: Cardinal-Priest

Personal details
- Born: Cinzio Passeri-Aldobrandini; 1551 Senigallia, Italy
- Died: 1 January 1610 (aged 58–59) Rome, Papal States
- Buried: San Pietro in Vincoli

Cinzio Passeri-Aldobrandini (1551 – 1 January 1610) was an Italian cardinal.

== Name ==
In some documents, he is known as Cinzio Personeni-Aldobrandini or Cinzio Passeri-Aldobrandini because, after settling in Romagna, the family varied its name according to the place from which they had moved. His father Aurelio Personeni was born in Cà Personeni (frazione of Bedulita in the province of Bergamo) and later Aurelio's family moved to Cà Passero (frazione of Berbenno in the province of Bergamo); as a merchant, Aurelio moved to Senigallia, where he married. The Latin inscription on his tomb monument identifies him simply as "CINTHIO ALDOBRANDINO".

== Life ==
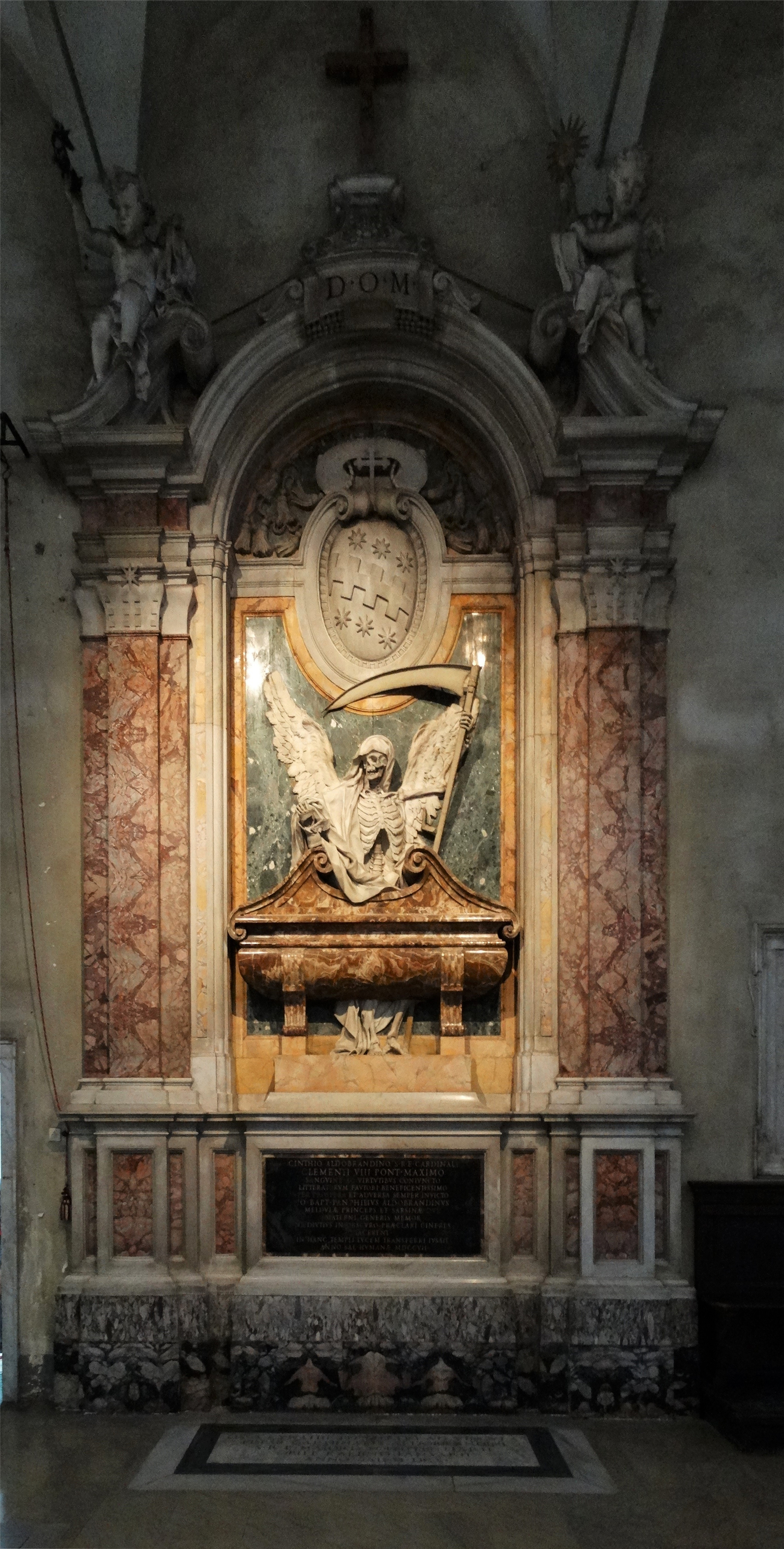
Tomb in the church San Pietro in Vincoli, Rome

Cinzio was born in Senigallia, son of Aurelio Personeni da Ca' Passero or Passeri, Doctor in Fine Arts and Medicine, son of Bernardino Passeri and wife, and wife Giulia or Elisabetta Aldobrandini, the latter being sister to Cardinal Giovanni Aldobrandini, Cardinal Ippolito Aldobrandini (later Pope Clement VIII), Pietro Aldobrandini (? - Rome, 11 February 1587), married to Flaminia Ferracci (? - Rome, 27 April 1603), sister of lawyer Muzio Ferracci (parents of Olimpia Aldobrandini, 1st Princess of Rossano, and Cardinal Pietro Aldobrandini), and Bernardo Aldobrandini, married to Livia Capizucchi, and daughter of Silvestro Aldobrandini and wife Lisa Donati.

In 1565, Cinzio began his studies in Letters and Law at Ippolito's household in Rome. Attending Rome's Collegio Germanico, the University of Perugia and the University of Padua, he graduated as a Doctor of Law at Padua. Cinzio accompanied Ippolito on the legation to bring an end to the war between Poland and Germany and in 1588, he was back in Rome to bring news of the legation's success to Pope Sixtus V.

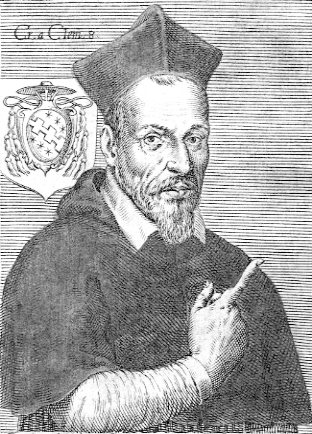
Engraving of Cinzio Aldobrandini

On 17 September 1593, the consistory named Cinzio a cardinal deacon of San Giorgio al Velabro with dispensation thanks to Ippolito's intercession to the College of Cardinals. Governor of Spoleto from 4 February 1595 until 21 February 1607, Cinzio then became prefect of the Tribunale della Segnatura Apostolica from 23 December 1599. From 1601 to 1607, he was papal legate to Avignon and he participated in the March–April and May 1605 conclaves. In 1605, he was made Major Penitentiary by pope Leo XI but suddenly resigned that office because he had still not been ordained priest; he was ordained priest later in 1605 and re-assumed the office. He was then given the titulus of San Pietro in Vincoli on 1 June 1605. He was known for his generosity to the poor and to the arts and letters, as well as being a friend of Torquato Tasso (for some years in the papal service).

Cinzio died in Rome in 1610 and was buried at San Pietro in Vincoli, where nearly a century later (1705–07), prince Giovanni Battista Pamphili Aldobrandini erected a monument to him, designed by the architect Carlo Francesco Bizzaccheri and with sculptures by Pierre Le Gros the Younger.
