= Fernando Cento =

Cardinal of the Catholic Church

His Eminence Fernando Cento
- Major Penitentiary of the Apostolic Penitentiary
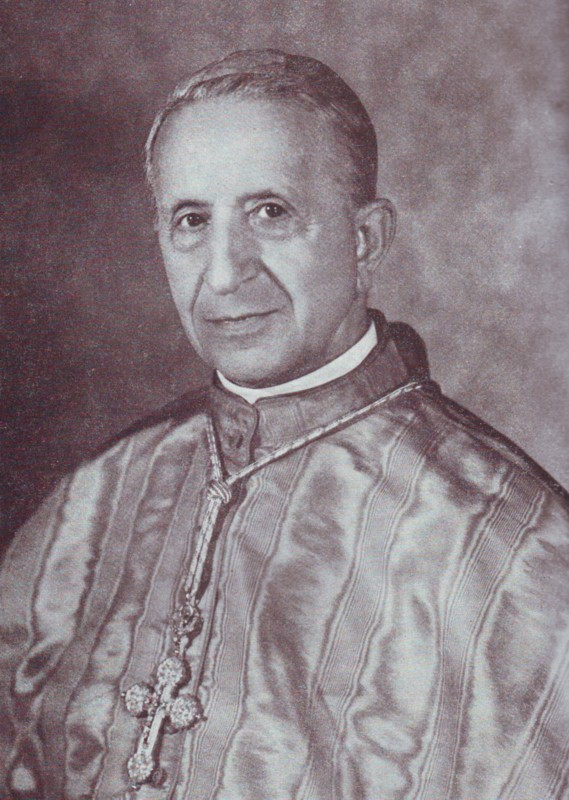
- Church: Roman Catholic Church
- Appointed: 12 February 1962
- Term ended: 7 April 1967
- Predecessor: Arcadio Larraona Saralegui
- Successor: Giuseppe Antonio Ferretto
- Other post: Cardinal-Bishop of Velletri (1965–73)
- Previous posts: Bishop of Acireale (1922–26); Apostolic Nuncio to Venezuela (1926–36); Titular Archbishop of Seleucia Pieria (1926–59); Apostolic Nuncio to Peru (1936–46); Apostolic Internuncio to Luxembourg (1946–50); Apostolic Nuncio to Belgium (1946–53); Apostolic Nuncio to Luxembourg (1950–53); Apostolic Nuncio to Portugal (1953–58); Cardinal-Priest of Sant'Eustachio "pro hac vice" (1959–65)

Orders
- Ordination: 23 December 1905
- Consecration: 3 September 1922 by Giovanni Tacci Porcelli
- Created cardinal: 15 December 1958 by Pope John XXIII
- Rank: Cardinal-Priest (1959–65); Cardinal-Bishop (1965–73)

Personal details
- Born: Fernando Cento; 10 August 1883 Pollenza, Kingdom of Italy
- Died: 13 January 1973 (aged 89) Rome, Italy
- Education: Pontifical Gregorian University; La Sapienza University
- Motto: Impendam et super impendar

Styles of Fernando Cento
- Reference style: His Eminence
- Spoken style: Your Eminence
- Informal style: Cardinal
- See: Velletri-Segni (suburbicarian see)

Fernando Cento (10 August 1883 – 13 January 1973) was a cardinal of the Catholic Church who served as Major Penitentiary of Apostolic Penitentiary.

== Early life ==
Fernando Cento was born in Pollenza, Italy. His parents were Evaristo Cento and his second wife, Ermelinda Andreani. He had a half-sister, Rosa, and a brother, Vincenzo.

He was educated at the Seminary of Macerata from 1893 to 1905, where he was taught philosophy and theology, and later at the Pontifical Gregorian University, where he studied canon law. He continued his studies at La Sapienza University, Rome where he obtained a doctorate in letters. He received the diaconate on 17 December 1905 in the basilica of the Madonna della Misericordia.

== Priest ==
He was ordained on 23 December 1905 in Macerata; he had to obtain a dispensation for being not yet 23. He served as professor of literature at the Seminary of Macerata and of philosophy at the State Institute of Macerata from 1906 to 1916. He demonstrated excellent qualities as a preacher in several Italian dioceses. He was called to military service when Italy entered the First World War in 1915 and was attached to the military hospital of Ancona from 1915 to 1917. He was created Privy chamberlain of His Holiness on 15 November 1917.

== Bishop and nuncio ==
He was appointed Bishop of Acireale by Pope Pius XI on 22 July 1922. He was consecrated on 3 September 1922, by Cardinal Giovanni Tacci Porcelli, Secretary of the Congregation for the Oriental Church, assisted by Domenico Pasi, Bishop of Macerata-Tolentino, and by Placido Ferniani, Bishop of Ruvo e Bitonto.

He was promoted to Titular Archbishop of Seleucia Pieria on 24 June 1926 and was appointed Apostolic Nuncio to Venezuela, four days later. He was next named Apostolic Nuncio to Peru on 26 July 1936. In addition, he was responsible for the affairs of the church in Ecuador, which did not have diplomatic relations with the Holy See for nearly forty years. He was named nuncio to Ecuador on 25 July 1937, once the Ecuadorian government and the Holy See established diplomatic relations.

He was appointed nuncio to Belgium and Internuncio to Luxembourg on 9 March 1946.

He became Nuncio to Portugal on 26 October 1953.

== Cardinal ==
Pope John XXIII, on 15 December 1958, created him Cardinal-Priest of Sant'Eustachio as his titular church on 12 March 1959. He was appointed as Major Penitentiary of Apostolic Penitentiary on 12 February 1962. He attended the Second Vatican Council, for which he led the commission which produced the Decree on the Apostolate of the Laity. He also produced a report on the practice of indulgences which was not favorably received by many at the council. He participated in the conclave of 1963 that elected Pope Paul VI. He was named a Cardinal bishop and given the title of the suburbicarian see of Velletri on 23 April 1965. He resigned his post of Major Penitentiary in 1967.

He died on 13 January 1973 in Rome. He was buried in the parish church of S. Antonio, Pollenza, where he had celebrated his first mass.

Catholic Church titles
Preceded by Arcadio Larraona Saralegui	Major Penitentiary of Apostolic Penitentiary; 12 February 1962 – 7 April 1967	Succeeded by Giuseppe Ferretto
Preceded by Clemente Micara	Cardinal-Bishop of Velletri-Segni; 23 April 1965 – 13 January 1973	Succeeded by Ildebrando Antoniutti
