= Olimpia Aldobrandini (1567–1637) =

16th- and 17th-century Italian noblewoman

Olimpia Aldobrandini, Princess of Meldola (1567 - 28 April 1637) was an Italian noblewoman, known by historians as Olimpia Aldobrandini the Elder to distinguish her from her granddaughter Olimpia Aldobrandini the Younger (1623-1681).

== Life ==
Born in Rome to Pietro Aldobrandini and Flaminia Ferracci, she was a sister of Pietro Aldobrandini (1571-1621), who was made a cardinal in 1593 by their uncle Pope Clement VIII.

In 1585 she married Giovanni Francesco Aldobrandini, first prince of Meldola and Sarsina (1545-1601) and had issue:

1. Silvestro (1587 – 1612), cardinal;
2. Margherita (1588 – 1646), married Ranuccio I Farnese, 4th Duke of Parma Piacenza, with whom she had nine children;
3. Elena (1590 – 1663), married Antonio Carafa della Stadera, fifth Duke of Mondragone, with whom she had three children;
4. Giovan Giorgio (1591 – 1637), 2nd prince of Meldola and Sarsina, married Ippolita Ludovisi, with whom he had one child Olimpia;
5. Caterina Lesa (1594 – 1620), married Marino II Caracciolo, 3rd prince of Avellino, with no issue;
6. Ippolito (1596 – 1638), cardinal;
7. Pietro (1600 – 1630), duke Carpineto, married Carlotta Savelli, with whom he had two children;
8. Maria (1601 – 1657), married Giovanni Paolo II Sforza, fifth Marquess of Caravaggio, with whom she had four children

She died in Rome.

=== Principality of Rossano and the Lordship of the Aldobrandini ===
In 1612 the Principality of Rossano, the estate of Longobucco and the hamlet of Paludi were bought by her brother Pietro for her son Giorgio Aldobrandini (1591-1637), then under his mother's tutelage. The sale of the Principality of Rossano cost the University 10,000 ducats, but as this sum was not available the estates of Valle dell'Ambra and San Giovanni in Foresta were ceded to Princess Aldobrandini. In 1620 she financed the construction of a new church in Corigliano-Rossano dedicated to San Nilo. The Principality was owned by the Aldobrandini family until the mid 17th century.
