= Giuseppe Paupini =

Italian prelate

His Eminence Giuseppe Paupini
- Camerlengo of the College of Cardinals
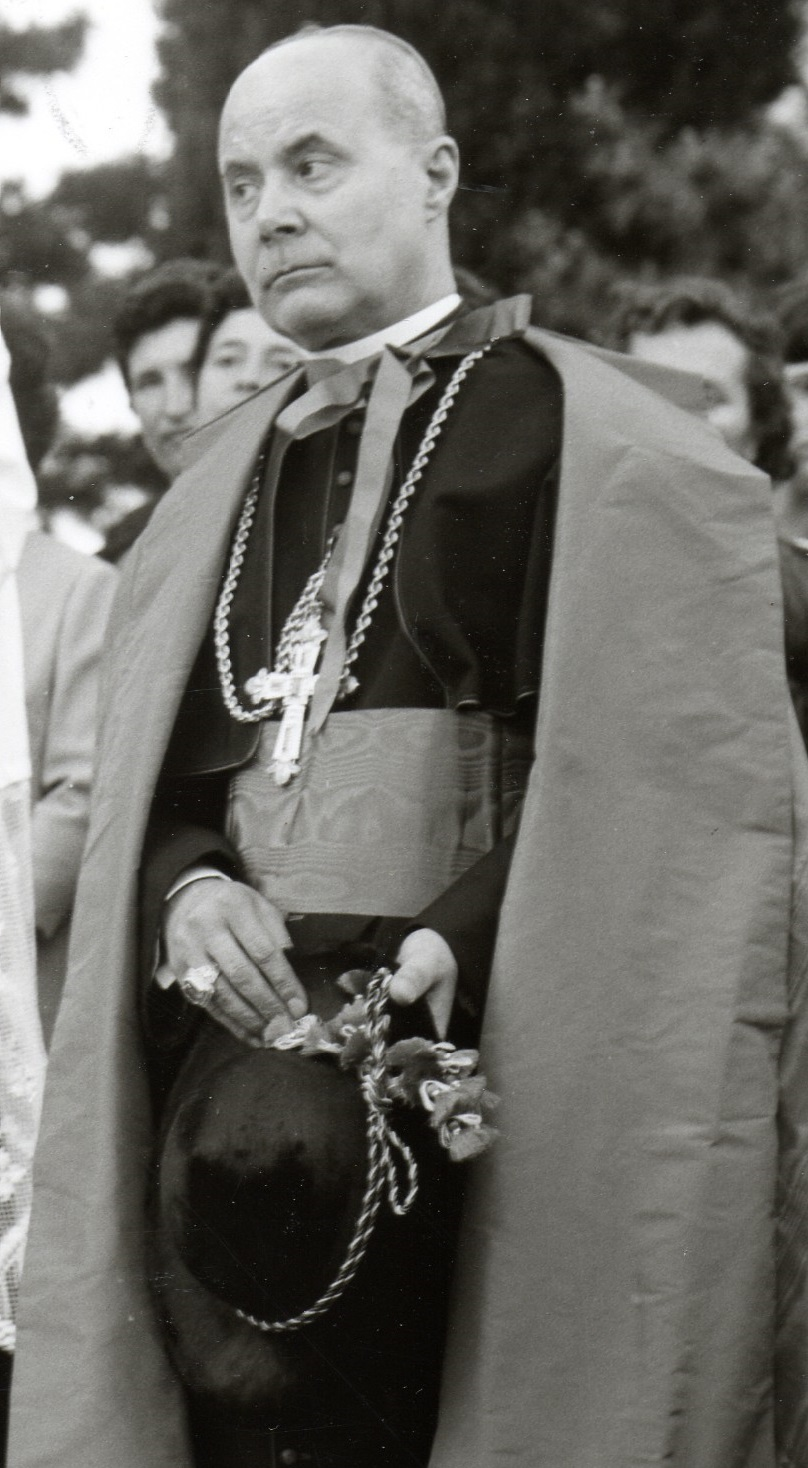
- Church: Roman Catholic Church
- Appointed: 22 June 1987
- Term ended: 2 May 1988
- Predecessor: Johannes Willebrands
- Successor: Silvio Angelo Pio Oddi
- Other post: Cardinal-Priest of Ognissanti in Via Appia Nuova pro hac vice (1979–92)
- Previous posts: Apostolic Internuncio to Iran (1956–57); Titular Archbishop of Sebastopolis in Abasgia (1956–69); Apostolic Nuncio to El Salvador (1957–59); Apostolic Nuncio to Guatemala (1957–59); Apostolic Nuncio to Colombia (1959–69); Cardinal-Deacon of Ognissanti in Via Appia Nuova (1969–79); Major Penitentiary of the Apostolic Penitentiary (1973–84)

Orders
- Ordination: 19 March 1930 by Giustino Sanchini
- Consecration: 26 February 1956 by Valerio Valeri
- Created cardinal: 28 April 1969 by Pope Paul VI
- Rank: Cardinal-Deacon (1969–79); Cardinal-Priest (1979–92)

Personal details
- Born: Giuseppe Paupini; 25 February 1907 Mondavio, Fano, Kingdom of Italy
- Died: 18 July 1992 (aged 85) Rome, Italy
- Education: Pontifical Lateran University
- Motto: Impendam et superimpendar
- Coat of arms

Styles of Giuseppe Paupini
- Reference style: His Eminence
- Spoken style: Your Eminence
- Informal style: Cardinal
- See: Sebastopoli di Abasgia (titular see)

Giuseppe Paupini (25 February 1907 – 18 July 1992) was an Italian prelate of the Catholic Church who spent most of his career in the diplomatic service of the Holy See before taking a position in the Roman Curia as Major Penitentiary of the Apostolic Penitentiary. He became a cardinal in 1969.

== Biography. ==
Giuseppe Paupini was born in Mondavio, Italy. He was educated at the local seminary of the diocese of Fano and later at the Pontifical Regional Seminary "Pio XI" and at the Pontifical Lateran University where he earned a doctorate in canon law. He was ordained on 19 March 1930 in Fano. He worked in the diocese of Fano and as a faculty member of its seminary from 1932 until 1939. He entered the diplomatic service of the Holy See in 1939 as attaché of the nunciature to France and later as secretary of the nunciature to Italy. He was chargé d'affaires of the nunciatures in Honduras, Nicaragua and Cuba between 1947 and 1951. He was promoted to counselor of nunciature in 1951. Between 1952 and 1956 he fulfilled pastoral assignments in the Diocese of Rome.

He was appointed Titular Archbishop by Pope Pius XII and appointed internuncio to Iran and at the same time Apostolic administrator of Ispahan of the Latins. He was consecrated on 26 February 1956 by Cardinal Valerio Valeri.

He was transferred as Nuncio to Guatemala and El Salvador on 25 February 1957. In 1959, he was appointed Nuncio to Colombia. He attended the Second Vatican Council in the 1960s.

He was made Cardinal-Deacon of Ognissanti in Via Appia Nuova by Pope Paul VI on 28 April 1969. He was appointed Major Penitentiary of the Apostolic Penitentiary on 21 March 1973. He took part in the conclaves that elected Pope John Paul I and Pope John Paul II in August and October. He opted for the order of Cardinal-Priests on 30 June 1979. He resigned the post of Major Penitentiary on 8 April 1984, at the age of 77. He was Camerlengo of the College of Cardinals from 22 June 1987 until 2 May 1988. He died on 18 July 1992.

Catholic Church titles
Preceded by Giuseppe Ferretto	Major Penitentiary of the Apostolic Penitentiary; 21 March 1973 – 8 April 1984	Succeeded by Luigi Dadaglio
