= Pope Clement VIII =

Head of the Catholic Church from 1592 to 1605

- Bishop of Rome
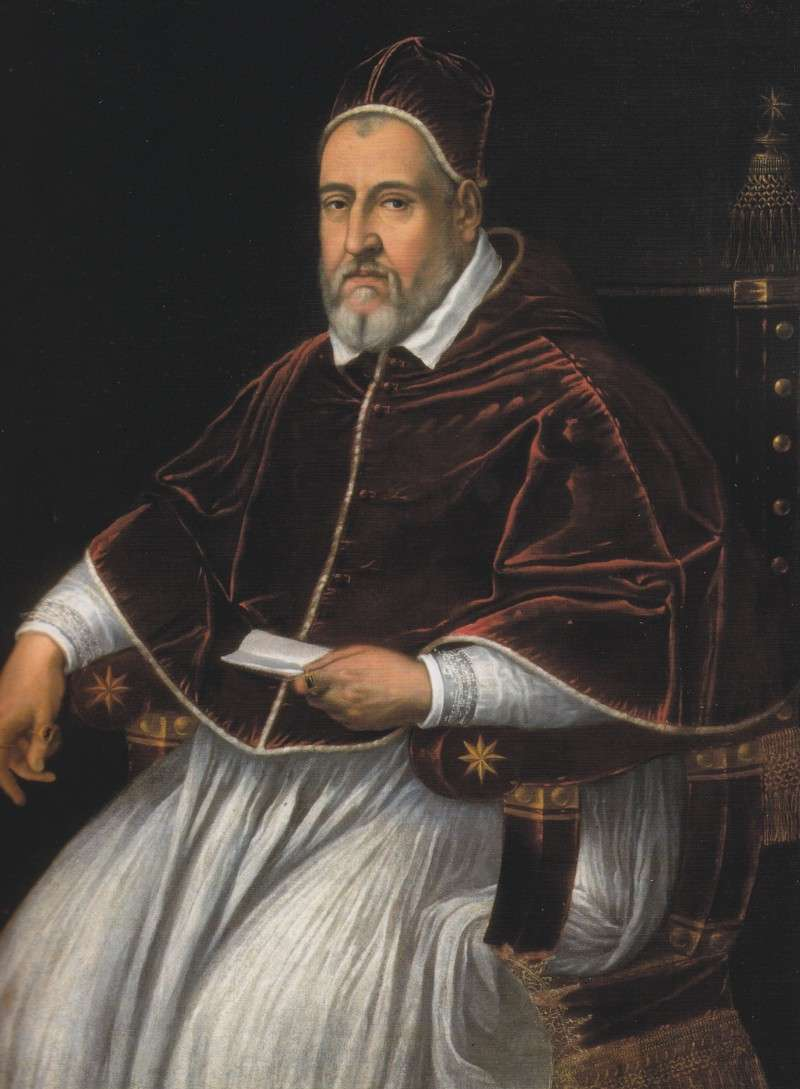
- Portrait by Antonio Scalvati, c. 1596
- Church: Catholic Church
- Papacy began: 30 January 1592
- Papacy ended: 3 March 1605
- Predecessor: Innocent IX
- Successor: Leo XI
- Previous posts: Auditor of the Roman Rota (1569); Apostolic Datary (1585–1592); Cardinal-Priest of San Pancrazio fuori le Mura (1586–1592); Apostolic Penitentiary (1586–1592); Legate a latere in Poland (1588–1589)

Orders
- Ordination: 31 December 1580
- Consecration: 2 February 1592 by Alfonso Gesualdo di Conza
- Created cardinal: 18 December 1585 by Sixtus V

Personal details
- Born: Ippolito Aldobrandini; 24 February 1536 Fano, Marche, Papal States
- Died: 3 March 1605 (aged 69) Rome, Papal States
- Signature: Clement VIII's signature

- Coat of arms: Clement VIII's coat of arms

Papal styles of Pope Clement VIII
- Reference style: His Holiness
- Spoken style: Your Holiness
- Religious style: Holy Father

Pope Clement VIII (Latin: Clemens VIII; Italian: Clemente VIII; 24 February 1536 – 3 March 1605), born Ippolito Aldobrandini, was head of the Catholic Church and ruler of the Papal States from 30 January 1592 to his death in March 1605.

Born in Fano, Papal States to a prominent Florentine family, he initially came to prominence as a canon lawyer before being made a Cardinal-Priest in 1585. In 1592, he was elected Pope and took the name of Clement. During his papacy, he effected the reconciliation of Henry IV of France to the Catholic faith and was instrumental in setting up an alliance of Christian nations to oppose the Ottoman Empire in the so-called Long War. He also successfully adjudicated in a bitter dispute between the Dominicans and the Jesuits on the issue of efficacious grace and free will. In 1600, he presided over a jubilee, which brought many pilgrimages to Rome. He presided over the trial and execution of Giordano Bruno and implemented strict measures against Jewish residents of the Papal States. According to some accounts, he may have been the first pope to drink coffee, and his approval thereof may have led to its popularisation.

Clement VIII died at the age of 69 in 1605, and his remains now rest in the Roman church of Santa Maria Maggiore.

== Early life ==
Ippolito was baptised on 4 March at the cathedral of Fano. He was from a Florentine family, son of Silvestro Aldobrandini and Lesa Deti, and followed his father as a canon lawyer, becoming an Auditor (judge) of the Roman Rota, the highest ecclesiastical court constituted by the Holy See. He was only ordained as a priest on 31 December 1580 at the age of 45 and became pope on 2 February 1592 when he was not yet 56. He was an effective, if sometimes rigorous, administrator.

== Cardinal ==
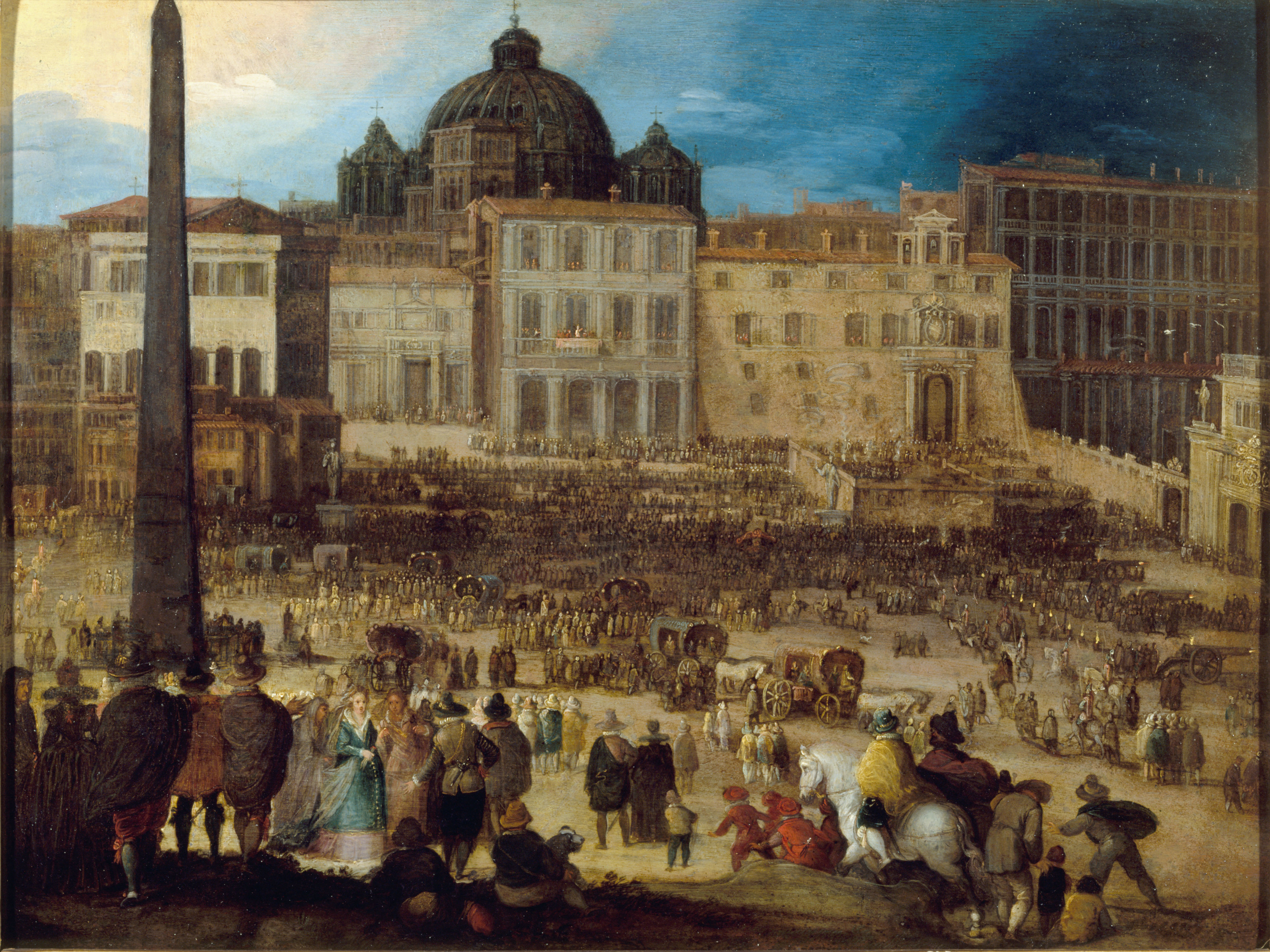
Election of Pope Clement VIII in 1592, by Louis de Caullery, Petit Palais (Paris)

He was made Cardinal-Priest of S. Pancrazio in 1585 by Pope Sixtus V, who named him major penitentiary in January 1586 and in 1588 sent him as Papal legate in Poland. He placed himself under the spiritual direction of the reformer Saint Philip Neri, who for thirty years was his confessor. Aldobrandini won the gratitude of the Habsburgs by his successful diplomatic efforts in Poland to obtain the release of the imprisoned Archduke Maximilian, the defeated candidate for the Polish throne.

After the death of Pope Innocent IX (1591), another stormy conclave ensued, in which a determined minority of Italian Cardinals were unwilling to be dictated to by Philip II of Spain. Known to be very intelligent, disciplined, and in tune with the inner workings of the Church, Cardinal Aldobrandini was elected on 30 January 1592, as a portent of more balanced and liberal Papal policy in European affairs. He took the non-politicised name Clement VIII. He proved to be an able Pope, with an unlimited capacity for work, and a lawyer's eye for detail. He was a wise statesman, the general object of whose policy was to free the Papacy from its dependence upon Spain.

== Ecclesiastical matters ==
=== Clementine Vulgate ===
In November 1592, he published the Clementine Vulgate. It was issued with the Bull Cum Sacrorum (9 November 1592) which asserted that every subsequent edition must be assimilated to this one, that no word of the text could be changed, and that not even variant readings could be printed in the margin. This new official version of the Vulgate, known as the Clementine Vulgate or Sixto-Clementine Vulgate, became and remained the official Bible of the Catholic Church until the Nova Vulgata replaced it in 1979.

=== De Auxiliis controversy ===
In 1597, he established the Congregatio de Auxiliis, which was to settle the theological controversy between the Dominican Order and the Jesuits concerning the respective roles of efficacious grace and free will. Although the debate tended toward a condemnation of Molinism's insistence on free will to the detriment of efficacious grace, the important influence of the Jesuit Order — among other considerations — which, beside important political and theological power in Europe, had also various missions abroad (Misiones Jesuiticas in South America, missions in China, etc.), led the Pope to abstain from an official condemnation of the Jesuits. In 1611 and again in 1625, a decree prohibited any discussion of the matter, although it was often informally skirted by the publication of commentaries on Thomas Aquinas.

=== Jubilee of 1600 ===
During the jubilee of 1600, three million pilgrims visited the holy places. The Synod of Brest was held 1595 in the Polish–Lithuanian Commonwealth, by which a great part of the Ruthenian clergy and people were reunited to Rome.

=== Canonisations and beatifications ===
Clement VIII canonised Hyacinth (17 April 1594), Julian of Cuenca (18 October 1594), and Raymond of Peñafort (1601). He beatified 205 individuals, 200 of them being group martyrs; notable individuals he named as Blessed included Carlo Borromeo.

=== Consistories ===
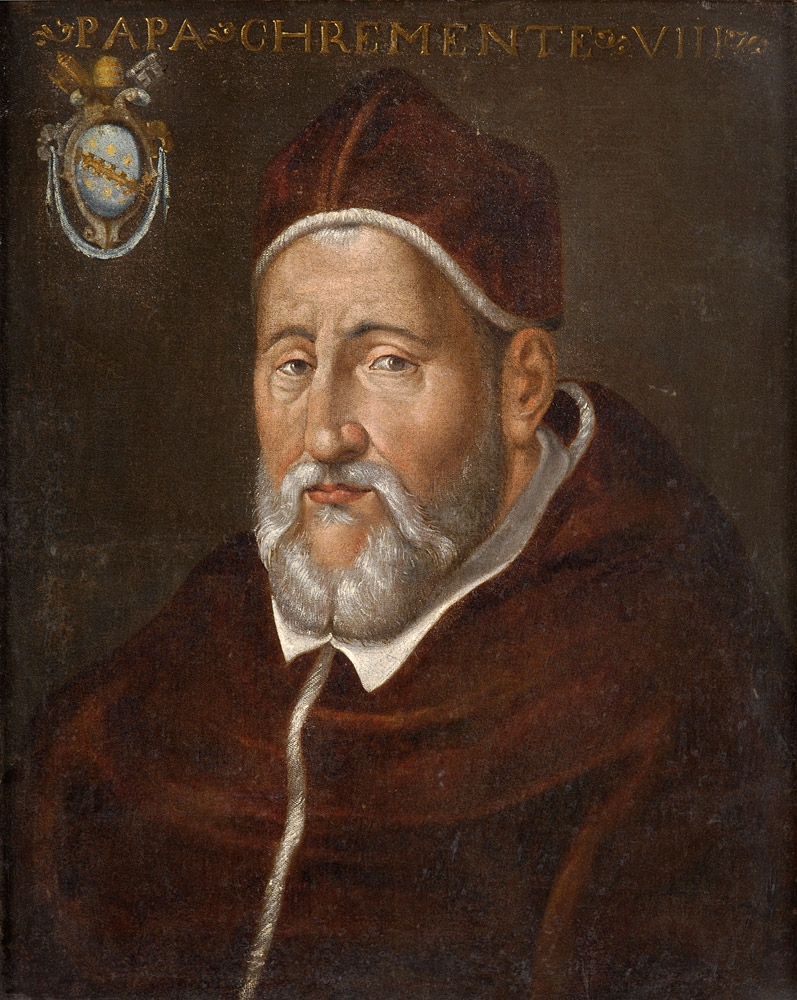
Portrait of Clement VIII by an unknown Italian artist, 17th century

The pope created 53 cardinals in six consistories during his pontificate; he named his two nephews Pietro and Cinzio Passeri as cardinals. Notable cardinals named during his reign included Camillo Borghese (his successor Pope Paul V) as well as the noted theologians Robert Bellarmine and Caesar Baronius.

== Foreign relations ==
=== Relations with France and Spain ===
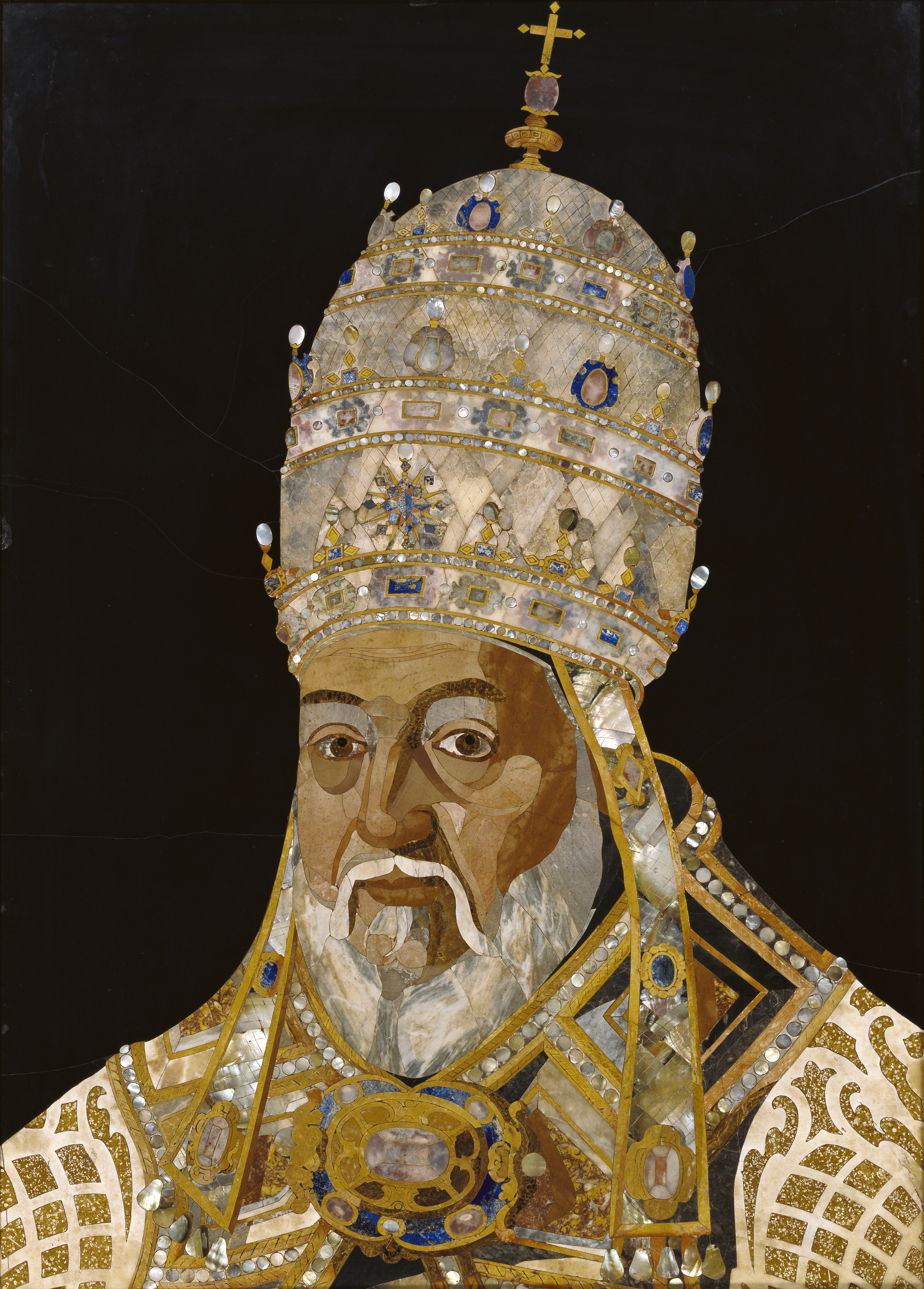
Portrait mosaic by Jacopo Ligozzi (c. 1601, J. Paul Getty Museum)

The most remarkable event of Clement VIII's reign was the reconciliation to the Church of Henry IV of France (1589–1610), after long negotiations, carried on with great dexterity through Cardinal Arnaud d'Ossat, that resolved the complicated situation in France. Henry embraced Catholicism on 25 July 1593. After a pause to assess Henry IV's sincerity, Clement VIII braved Spanish displeasure, and in the autumn of 1595, he solemnly absolved Henry IV, thus putting an end to the thirty years' religious war in France.

Henry IV's friendship was of essential importance to the papacy two years later, when Alfonso II d'Este, Duke of Ferrara, died childless (27 October 1597), and the pope resolved to attach the stronghold of the Este family to the states of the Church. Though Spain and the Emperor Rudolf II encouraged Alfonso II's illegitimate cousin, Cesare d'Este, to withstand the pope, they were deterred from giving him any material aid by Henry IV's threats, and a Papal army entered Ferrara almost unopposed.

In 1598 Clement VIII won more credit for the papacy by bringing about a definite treaty of peace between Spain and France in the Peace of Vervins, which put an end to their long contest; he negotiated peace between France and the Duchy of Savoy as well.

=== Long War ===
In 1594, Clement VIII initiated an alliance of Christian European powers to take part in the war with the Ottoman Empire, fought mainly in Hungary, which would become known as the "Long Turkish War" and continue past Clement's own lifetime. To that extent, he send out Aleksandar Komulović of Nona on a secret mission to Central and Eastern Europe to persuade their rulers, especially the Ottoman vassals Sigismund Báthory of Transylvania, Aron Vodă of Moldavia and Michael the Brave of Wallachia to switch sides. This was crowned with success as a treaty of alliance was signed in Prague by Rudolf II, Holy Roman Emperor and Sigismund Báthory in 1594. Aron Vodă and Michael the Brave joined the alliance later that year. Clement VIII himself lent the Emperor valuable assistance in men and money. His nephew Giovanni Francesco Aldobrandini led the papal contingent of 12,000 men personally and aided both in the successful retaking of Esztergom and of Visegrád in 1595.

== Internal policies ==
=== Law enforcement ===
Clement VIII was as vigorous as Pope Sixtus V (1585–90) in crushing banditry in the Papal provinces of Umbria and the Marche and in punishing the lawlessness of the Papal nobility. Upon his ascension to the Papal throne in 1592, he immediately had several noble troublemakers put to death. These included most famously Troio Savelli, scion of a powerful ancient Roman family, and the youthful and noble Beatrice Cenci, who had murdered her father – probably as a consequence of his repeated abuses. The latter case prompted many requests of clemency – rejected by the Pope, who passed the confiscated Cenci property to his own family.

Clement's strict ways also concerned philosophical and religious matters. In 1599, he had the Italian miller Menocchio – who had formed the belief that God was not eternal but had Himself once been created out of chaos – tried by the Inquisition and burnt at the stake. A more famous case was the trial for heresy of Giordano Bruno, who was burned at the stake in 1600. Pope Clement VIII participated personally in the final phases of the trial, inviting the Cardinals in charge of the case to proceed with the verdict.

=== Anti-Jewish measures ===
Clement VIII tightened measures against the Jewish inhabitants of his territories. In 1592, the papal bull Cum saepe accidere forbade the Jewish community of the Comtat Venaissin of Avignon, a Papal enclave, to sell new goods, putting them at an economic disadvantage. In 1593, the bull Caeca et Obdurata reiterated Pope Pius V's decree of 1569, which banned Jews from living in the Papal States outside the cities of Rome, Ancona, and Avignon. The main effect of the bull was to evict Jews who had returned to areas of the Papal States (mainly Umbria) after 1586 (following their expulsion in 1569) and to expel Jewish communities from cities like Bologna (which had been incorporated under papal dominion since 1569). The bull also alleged that Jews worldwide had engaged in usury and exploited the hospitality of Clement VIII's predecessors "who, in order to lead them from their darkness to knowledge of the true faith, deemed it opportune to use the clemency of Christian piety towards them" (alluding to Christiana pietas). With the bull Cum Hebraeorum malitia a few days later, Clement VIII also forbade the reading of the Talmud.

== Later life and death ==
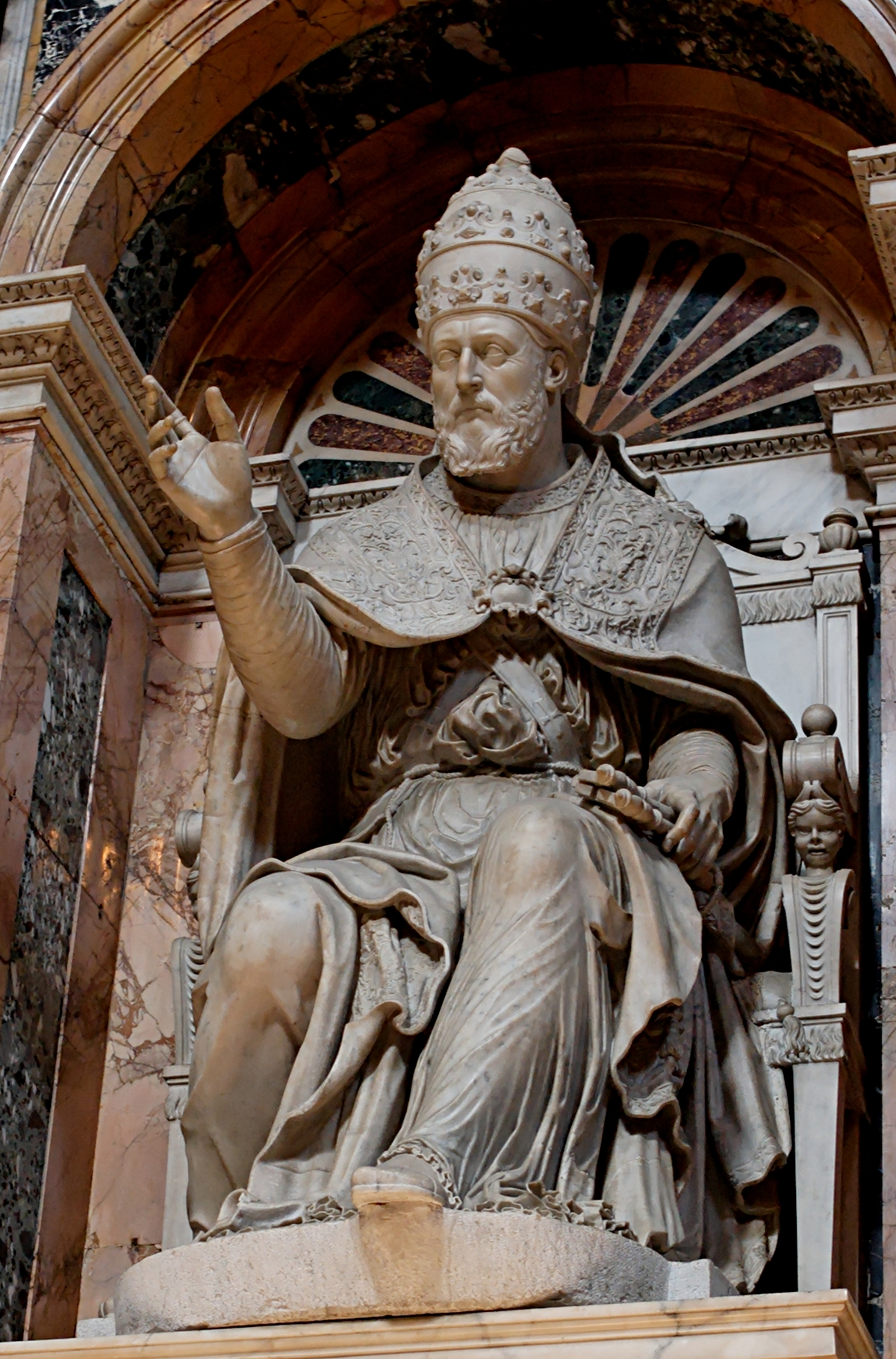
Statue of Clement VIII in the Basilica di Santa Maria Maggiore

Clement VIII was afflicted by gout, using a wheelchair by the late 1590s, and was forced to spend much of his later life immobilised in bed. He suddenly became ill on 10 February 1605, and his condition rapidly deteriorated over the next few weeks. He died on 3 March 1605 around midnight, leaving a reputation for prudence, munificence, ruthlessness and capacity for business. Clement was buried in St. Peter's Basilica, and later Pope Paul V (1605–21) had a mausoleum built for him in the Borghese Chapel of Santa Maria Maggiore, where his remains were transferred in 1646.

His reign is especially distinguished by the number and beauty of his medals. Clement VIII founded the Collegio Clementino for the education of the sons of the richer classes, and augmented the number of national colleges in Rome by opening the Collegio Scozzese for the training of missionaries to Scotland.

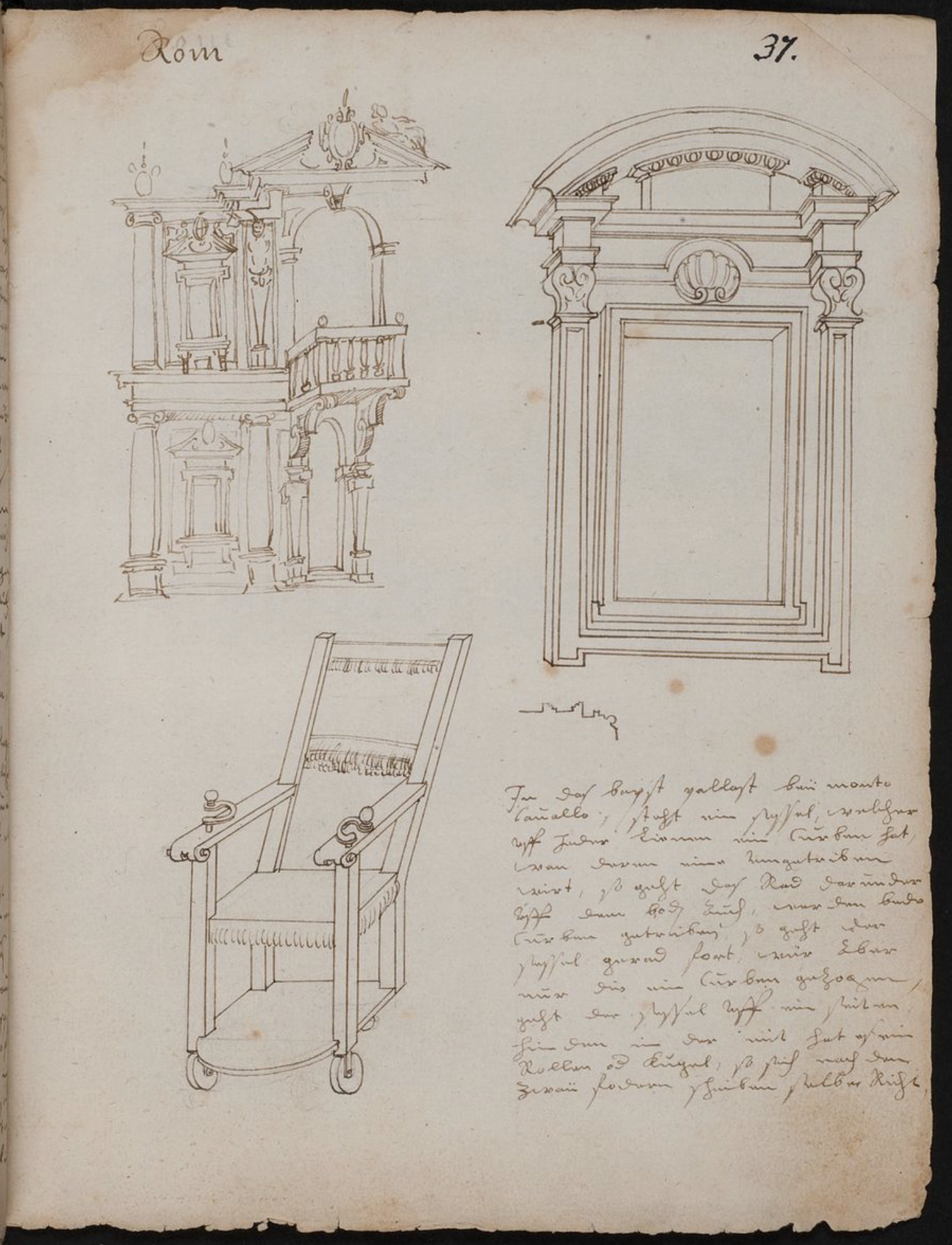
Page from the travel journal of Heinrick Schickhardt, showing Pope Clement VIII's wheelchair.

== Coffee ==
Coffee aficionados often claim that the spread of its popularity among Catholics is due to Pope Clement VIII's influence. According to the legend, there was opposition to coffee as "Satan's drink", leading to the pope's advisors asking him to denounce the beverage. However, upon tasting coffee, Pope Clement VIII declared: "Why, this Satan's drink is so delicious that it would be a pity to let the infidels have exclusive use of it." Clement allegedly blessed the bean because it appeared better for the people than alcoholic beverages. The year often cited is 1600. It is not clear whether this is a true story, but it may have been found amusing at the time.

== In popular culture ==
- Pope Clement VIII is the main antagonist of Tobias Sammet's Avantasia metal opera albums The Metal Opera and The Metal Opera Part II, where he is voiced by Oliver Hartmann.

== See also ==
- Giovanni Aldobrandini, his older brother, who was a cardinal
- Sixto-Clementine Vulgate
- Cardinals created by Clement VIII

== Sources ==
- de Jong, Jan L. (2022). Tombs in Early Modern Rome (1400–1600): Monuments of Mourning, Memory and Meditation. Brill. ISBN 9789004526938.274-275

Catholic Church titles
Preceded by Innocent IX	Pope; 30 January 1592 – 3 March 1605	Succeeded by Leo XI
