= Pietro Aldobrandini =

Catholic cardinal (1571–1621)

His Eminence Pietro Aldobrandini
- Cardinal, Archbishop of Ravenna
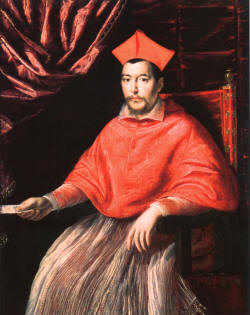
- Church: Catholic Church
- Archdiocese: Ravenna
- Installed: 17 October 1604
- Term ended: 10 February 1621
- Predecessor: Cristoforo Boncompagni
- Successor: Luigi Capponi
- Other post: Camerlengo of the Holy Roman Church

Orders
- Ordination: December 1598
- Consecration: 17 October 1604 by Clement VIII
- Created cardinal: 17 September 1593 by Clement VIII
- Rank: Cardinal-deacon of S. Nicola in Carcere, then Cardinal-priest of S. Pancrazio, SS. Giovanni e Paolo, S. Maria in Trastevere, finally Cardinal-bishop of Sabina

Personal details
- Born: 31 March 1571 Rome, Papal States
- Died: 10 February 1621 (aged 49) Rome, Papal States
- Buried: Santa Maria sopra Minerva, Rome
- Denomination: Catholic
- Parents: Pietro Aldobrandini (d. 1587), Flaminia Ferracci (d. 1605)

Pietro Aldobrandini (31 March 1571 – 10 February 1621) was an Italian cardinal and patron of the arts.

== Biography ==
Pietro Aldobrandini was a cousin of Cardinal Cinzio Aldobrandini, and uncle of Cardinals Silvestro and Ippolito Aldobrandini.

=== Cardinal ===
He was made a cardinal in 1593 by his uncle, Pope Clement VIII, with the title Cardinal-deacon of San Nicola in Carcere. The church was rebuilt in 1599, with a new facade by Giacomo della Porta. Aldobrandini took over the Duchy of Ferrara in 1598 when it fell to the Papal States and his collection of paintings was augmented by works removed from Ferrara. He served as Camerlengo of the Holy Roman Church, charged with the fiscal administration of the Patrimony of Saint Peter. In 1600, he traveled to Lyon as papal legate to bless the marriage of Henry IV of France and Marie de' Medici.

On 17 Oct 1604, he was consecrated bishop by Pope Clement VIII, with François-Marie Tarugi, Archbishop of Siena, Alessandro Ottaviano de' Medici, Cardinal-Bishop of Palestrina, and Ottavio Bandini, Archbishop of Fermo, serving as co-consecrators. He became archbishop of Ravenna in 1604 and Cardinal-Priest of San Pancrazio, but opted the following year for Santi Giovanni e Paolo al Celio. In 1612, he was named Cardinal-Priest of Santa Maria in Trastevere.

=== Patron of the arts ===
In 1598, Pope Clement gave Pietro the old Ruffini villa at Frascati as a reward for successful negotiations he had undertaken with the French. It was known as the Villa Aldobrandini. His architect, Giacomo della Porta, began the work. Carlo Maderno added a loggia; Giovanni Fontana worked on the garden. Domenichino painted frescoes in a garden pavilion.

In 1600, Clement acquired the Vitelli Gardens on the Quirinal Hill. The following year, he gave this to his nephew. The old buildings were demolished and construction began on the new villa and adjacent garden. Della Porta equipped the building with stairs, and loggias. The upper floors of the Palazzo Aldobrandini held a rich collection of works of art left to the cardinal by the Duchess of Urbino Lucrezia d'Este, in 1598.

He was a patron of Torquato Tasso, and of Girolamo Frescobaldi.

== Works ==
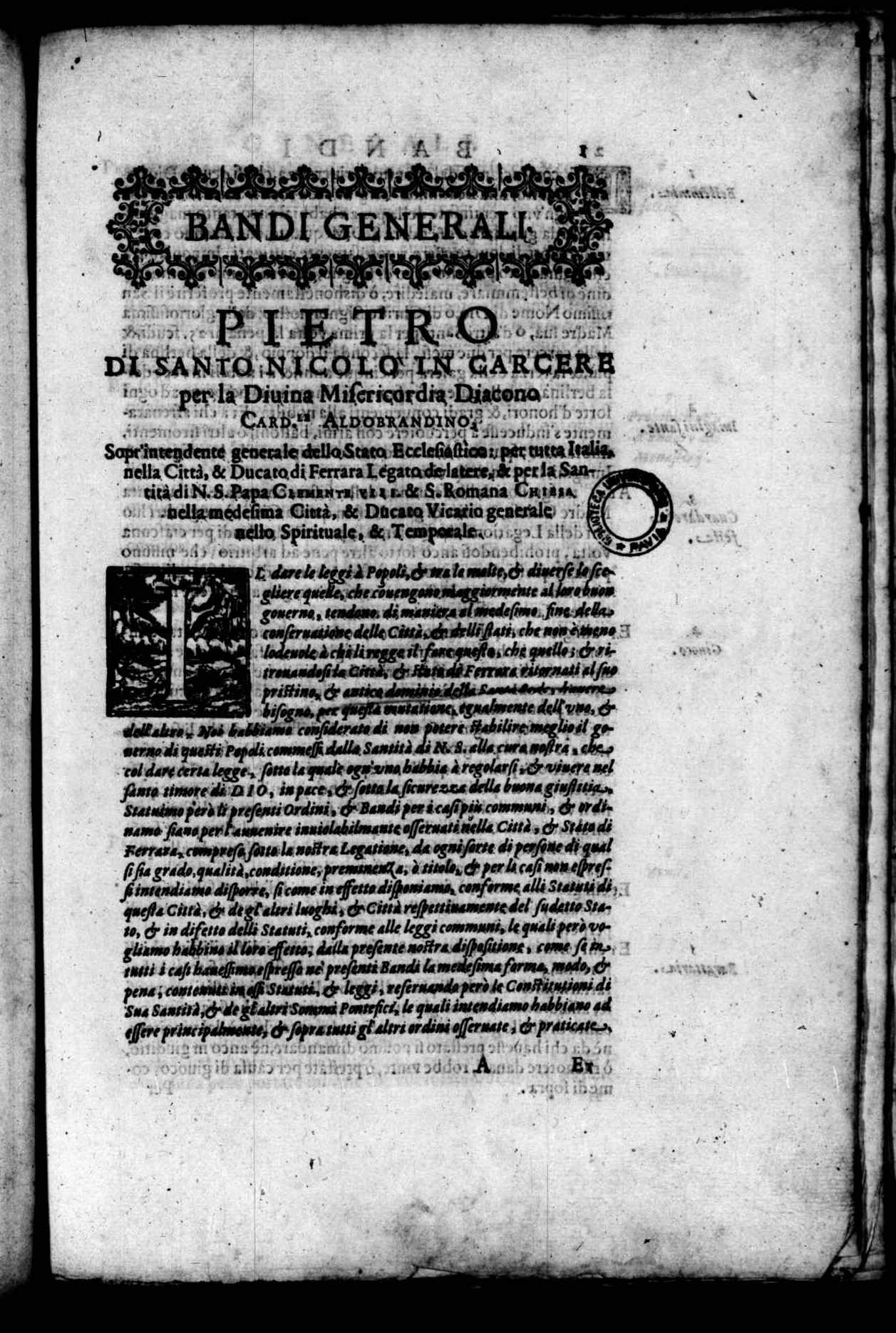
Bandi generali del cardinale Aldobrandino da osservarsi nella città, stato et legatione di Ferrara, 1598

- Bandi generali del cardinale Aldobrandino da osservarsi nella città, stato et legatione di Ferrara (in Italian). Ferrara: Vittorio Baldini. 1598.

== Bibliography ==
- Asano Guarini, E. F (1960). "Aldobrandini, Pietro," in: Dizionario Biografico degli italiani, 2, Roma 1960, pp. 107-112.

Catholic Church titles
Preceded by Federico Borromeo (seniore)	Cardinal-Deacon of San Nicola in Carcere; 1593–1604	Succeeded by Carlo Emmanuele Pio di Savoia
Preceded by Enrico Caetani	Camerlengo of the Apostolic Chamber; 1599–1621	Succeeded by Ludovico Ludovisi
Preceded by Girolamo Mattei	Cardinal-Priest of San Pancrazio; 1604–1605	Succeeded by Domenico Ginnasi
Preceded by Cristoforo Boncompagni	Archbishop of Ravenna; 1604–1621	Succeeded by Luigi Capponi
Preceded by Ottavio Acquaviva d'Aragona (seniore)	Cardinal-Priest of Santi Giovanni e Paolo; 1605–1612	Succeeded by Decio Carafa
Preceded by Francesco Maria Bourbon Del Monte Santa Maria	Cardinal-Priest of Santa Maria in Trastevere; 1612–1620	Succeeded by Bartolomeo Cesi
Preceded by Benedetto Giustiniani	Cardinal-Bishop of Sabina; 1620–1621	Succeeded by Odoardo Farnese
