= Giacomo Serra =

Giacomo Serra may refer to:

- Jaume Serra i Cau (died 1517), Spanish Valencian cardinal
- Giacomo Serra (cardinal) (1570-1623), Roman Catholic cardinal
- Giacomo Serra (sport shooter) (1893–?), Italian sports shooter at the 1924 Olympics
