= Jacob Blessing the Sons of Joseph =

Jacob Blessing the Sons of Joseph may refer to:

- Jacob Blessing the Sons of Joseph (Rembrandt), 1656 work by Rembrandt
- Jacob Blessing the Sons of Joseph (Guercino), 1620 work by Guercino
