= Pietro Maria Borghese =

Italian Catholic cardinal

His Eminence Pietro Maria Borghese
- Cardinal-Deacon of San Crisogono
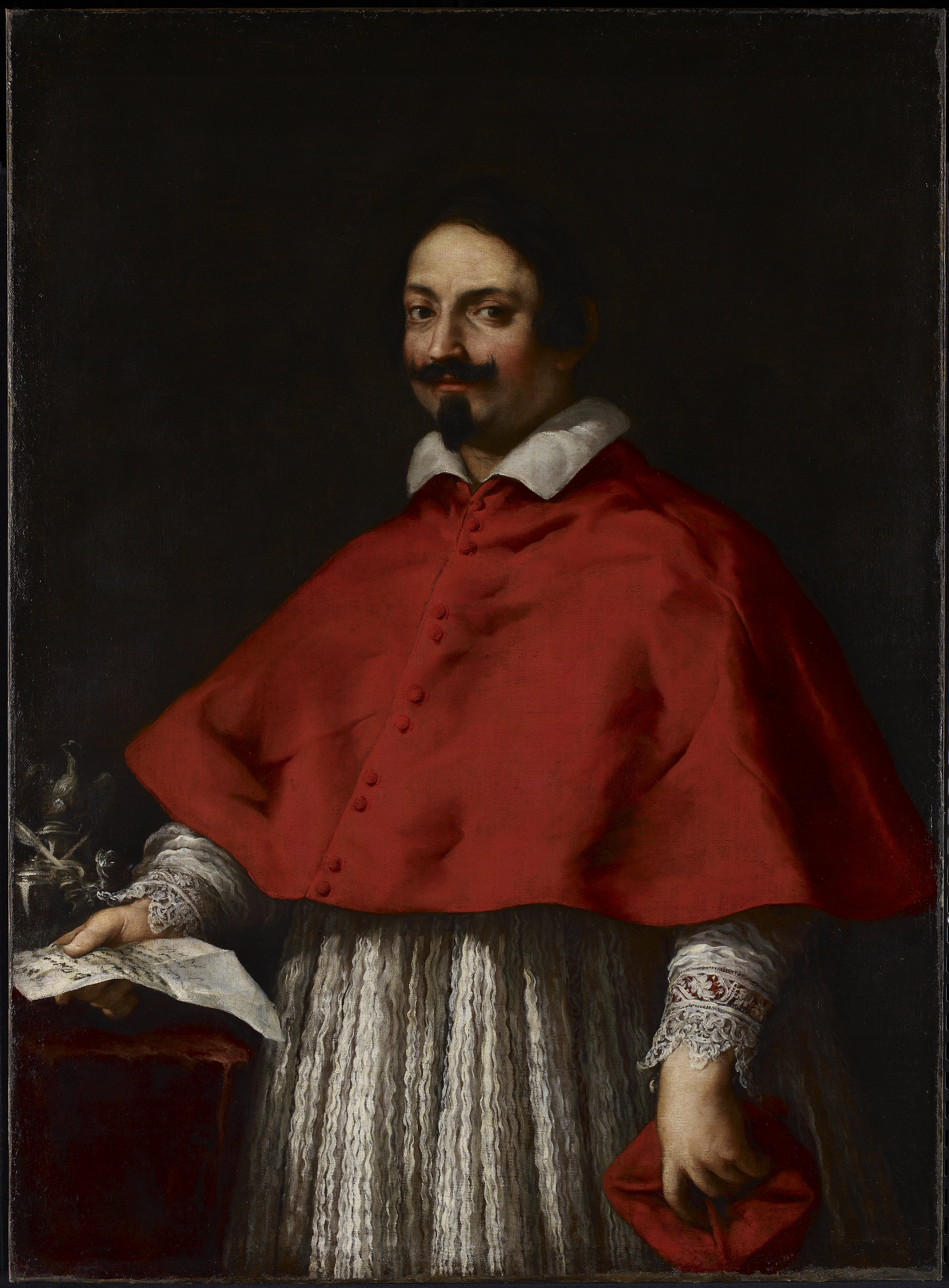
- Portrait of Pietro Maria Borghese by Pietro Cortona c.1633-35
- Church: Catholic Church

Personal details
- Born: 1599 Siena, Italy
- Died: 15 June 1642 (age 43)

Pietro Maria Borghese (1599 - 15 June 1642) was an Italian Catholic Cardinal.

== Early life ==
Borghese was born in 1599 in Siena, the son of Marcantonio Borghese and Camilla Orsini. Despite the rampant nepotism that was to later define papal politics of the 17th century, Borghese received no particular benefits from his great uncle Pope Paul V whose reign continued until 1621. Maffeo Barberini, however, was raised to the cardinalate by Pope Paul and felt a need to recognise the Borghese family with a similar honour. When he was elected to the papal throne as Pope Urban VIII in 1623, he set about repaying those who had advanced his own career.

== Cardinalate ==
So it was that Borghese was elevated to Cardinal by Pope Urban VIII the following year, on 7 October 1624 and was appointed cardinal-deacon of the church of San Giorgio in Velabro. He was also appointed commendatario of three "rich" abbeys from which he could benefits and income. In 1626, he was appointed cardinal-deacon of Santa Maria in Cosmedin.

In 1633, he was appointed Cardinal-protector of Flanders and he opted for the title of the San Crisogono pro illa vice deaconry in 1636. In 1638, he was appointed Cardinal-protector of the Republic of Genoa. He held both protectorate positions until his death.

He died on 15 June 1642 in Rome and was buried in the Borghese chapel in the Liberian Basilica.

Catholic Church titles
Preceded by Giacomo Serra	Cardinal-Deacon of San Giorgio in Velabro; 1624–1626	Succeeded by Giovanni Stefano Donghi
Preceded by Alessandro Orsini	Cardinal-Deacon of Santa Maria in Cosmedin; 1626–1633	Succeeded by Lelio Biscia
Preceded by Scipione Caffarelli-Borghese	Cardinal-Deacon of San Crisogono; 1633–1642	Succeeded by Faustus Poli
