= Mercati =

People with the last name Mercati:

- Michele Mercati (8 April 1541 – 25 June 1593) an Italian physician
- Giovanni Mercati (17 December 1866 – 23 August 1957) an Italian cardinal of the Roman Catholic Church
