= Orazio Maffei =

Roman Catholic cardinal

His Eminence Orazio Maffei
- Cardinal-Priest of Santi Marcellino e Pietro; Archbishop of Chieti
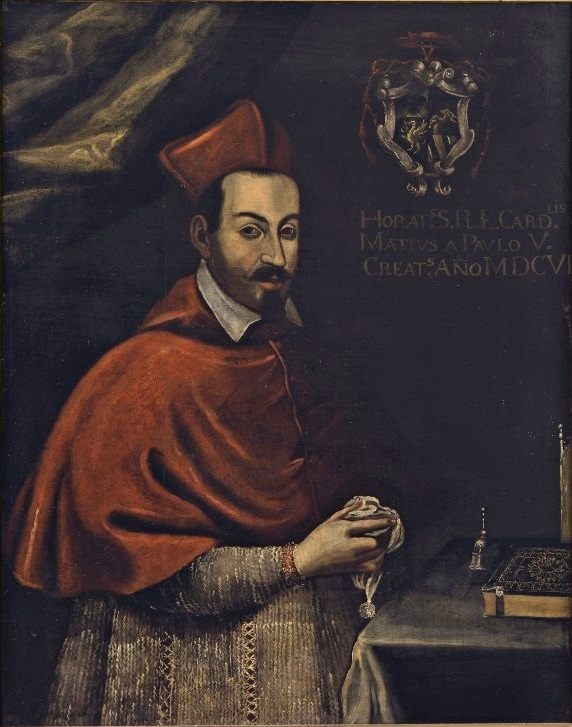
- Church: Catholic Church
- Archdiocese: Chieti

Orders
- Consecration: 16 September 1607 by Cardinal Marcello Lante della Rovere
- Created cardinal: by Pope Paul V
- Rank: deacon (1606), priest (1607)

Personal details
- Born: 1580 Rome, Italy
- Died: 11 January 1609 (age 29) Rome

Orazio Maffei (1580–1609) was a Roman Catholic cardinal. Born in Rome but belonging to the Mirandola branch of the Maffei, he was the son of Mario Maffei and Plautilla Fabi. Two of his father's brothers had been cardinals, Bernardino (1514–1553) and Marcantonio (1521–1583).

== Biography ==
He studied at the University of Perugia, where he obtained a doctorate. Pope Paul V appointed him a cleric of the Apostolic Camera.

Maffei was named a cardinal by Pope Paul on 11 September 1606, and assigned the deaconry of San Giorgio in velabro on 9 October. On 7 February 1607, he was promoted cardinal-priest, and assigned the titular church of Ss. Marcellino e Pietro.

He was appointed archbishop of Chieti by Pope Paul on 3 September 1607. On 16 Sep 1607, he was consecrated bishop by Marcello Lante della Rovere, Bishop of Todi, with Bishop Metello Bichi, of Sovana, and Girolamo di Porzia, Bishop of Adria, acting as co-consecrators.

Having been archbishop of Chieti for less than a year, he found himself in trouble with Pope Paul V, due to accusations which included violation of his vow of chastity with a woman of the diocese. He was summoned to Rome, where he died on 11 January 1609, at the age of twenty-nine. He was buried in the family tomb in the church of Santa Maria sopra Minerva in Rome.

Francesco Maria Guazzo (Guaccius) dedicated the first edition (1608) of his book, Compendium maleficarum, to Cardinal Orazio Maffei, the Protector of the Ambrosian Order, of which Guazzo was a member.

== Bibliography ==
- Ceretti, F. (1896). "Famiglia Maffei (Ramo Mirandola–Piemonte)," (in Italian), in: Giornale araldico, genealogico, diplomatico italiano Vol. 24 (Bari: R. Accademia Araldica Italiana 1896), pp. 48-74, esp. pp. 52-54.
- Gauchat, Patritius (Patrice) (1935). Hierarchia catholica (in Latin). Vol. IV (1592-1667). Münster: Libraria Regensbergiana.
- Zanetov, P. (2005). "Il cardinale Orazio Maffei e la loggia del palazzo alla Dataria," (in Italian), in: Bruno Toscano (ed.), Arte e immagine del papato Borghese (1605-1621), (San Casciano: Libro Company Italia 2005), pp. 201-208.

Catholic Church titles
Preceded by Cinzio Passeri Aldobrandini	Cardinal-Priest of San Giorgio in Velabro; 1606–1607	Succeeded by Giacomo Serra
Preceded by Mariano Pierbenedetti	Cardinal-Priest of Santi Marcellino e Pietro; 1607–1609	Succeeded by Giovanni Battista Deti
Preceded by Anselmo Marzato	Archbishop of Chieti; 1607–1609	Succeeded by Ulpiano Volpi
