= Silvio Giuseppe Mercati =

Italian classical philologist and academician (1877–1963)

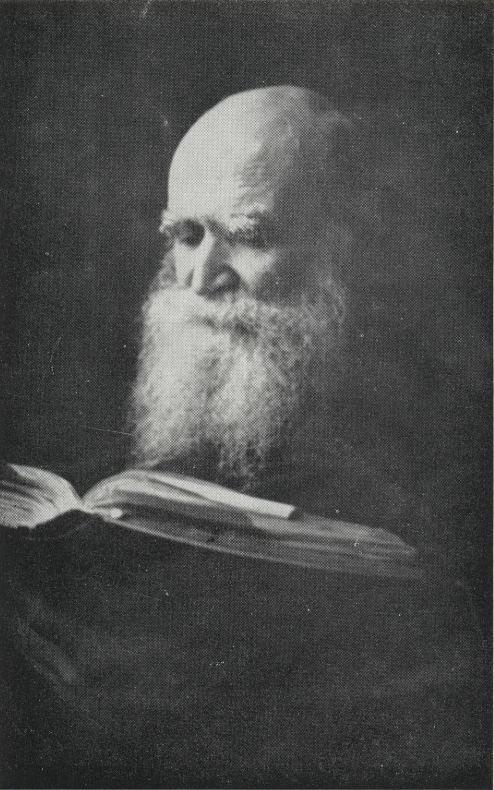
Portrait of Mercati published by Follieri (1964), facing p. 5.

Silvio Giuseppe Mercati (born Giuseppe Mercati; 16 September 1877–16 October 1963) was an Italian Byzantinist, recognized as the first Italian classical scholar who specialized in Byzantine studies and the first Professor of Byzantine studies in the Italian university system.

== Biography ==
Mercati was born in Reggio Emilia (precisely in the village of Villa Gaida) from a middle-class family. He had two older brothers, Giovanni and Angelo, who both became ecclesiastics, the former working as 'Dottore' of the Ambrosian Library and later as prefect of the Vatican Library, whereas the latter became archivist of the Vatican Secret Archive.

Mercati initially enrolled in the Accademia Scientifico-Letteraria of Milan (precursor of the University of Milan) in 1896, but soon had to move to Naples for health reasons (1897–1898), studying at the local university. After a year-break, in 1899–1900 he studied at the University of Rome and, from 1900–1901 to 1904–1905, at the University of Bologna, where he graduated defending a thesis on the Greek versions of the writings of Ephrem the Syrian (tutored by Vittorio Puntoni). From 1905 to 1907 he taught in high schools; in that year he won a scholarship and spent three years in Germany, where he specialized in Byzantine philology with Wilhelm Meyer (Göttingen) and Karl Krumbacher (Munich).

He was Lecturer in German language at the Sapienza University (1916–1919); at the same time he was habilitated to university teaching and taught Byzantine Philology from 1918 to 1924. In 1924–1925 Mercati was professor of Greek literature at the University of Catania, but moved almost immediately to the Sapienza University of Rome, where he taught Byzantine studies, palaeography and papyrology until his retirement in 1949. In 1957, his friends and colleagues edited a Festschrift in his honor. Among his disciples were Giuseppe Schirò (professor at the University of Padua and then at the Sapienza, after Ciro Giannelli's brief experience), Enrica Follieri (Schirò's successor) and Bruno Gentili, who later specialized in archaic Greek poetry.

From 1931 (vol. III) to his death he edited the Studi Bizantini e Neoellenici series; in the same year he was deputy chair of the Fifth International Congress of Byzantine Studies (Rome), and in 1951 he chaired the Eight Congress (Palermo). In 1952 he was elected first president of the Associazione Nazionale di Studi Bizantini. He gifted a large part of his private library to the Sapienza University after his retirement, and the rest was purchased by the University of Palermo after his death.

His older brothers Angelo and Giovanni died in 1955 and 1957 respectively; widowed since 1952, he died in Rome in 1963. He was interested in rhabdomancy.

== Research ==
Mercati specialized in Byzantine literature, in particular poetry and literature with religious background. He wrote several short articles and notes and a monograph—the critical edition of Ephrem's Greek sermons. His disciple Giuseppe Schirò identified three leading lines of research in his activity: 1. – Literary and historical texts; 2. – Epigraphy; 3. – Literary texts transmitted by papyri (and Biblical, liturgical, and hagiographical texts in particular). His disciple (and successor) Enrica Follieri cited "l'originalità, l'erudizione, la brevità" [originality, erudition, brevity] as the most evident characteristics of Mercati's production.

Starting from 1908, Mercati signed his publications as "Giuseppe Silvio" to distinguish himself from his older brother Giovanni, who also was a Byzantine scholar—since the two shared the same initial of first name; from his edition of Ephrem's texts in 1915, he inverted the two names, and since then he wrote Silvio Giuseppe Mercati.

A large part of his minor works was reprinted in 1970.

== Publications ==
Mercati's full bibliography was compiled by Augusta Acconcia Longo.

- Mercati, Giuseppe (1908). "Di un carme anacreontico spurio e mutilo di Gregorio Nazianzeno". BZ. 17 (2): 389–397. doi:10.1515/byzs.1908.17.2.389.
- Maas, Paul; Mercati, Giuseppe Silvio; Gassisi, D. Sofronio (M. Bas.) (1909). "Gleichzeilige Hymnen in der byzantinischen Liturgie". BZ. 18 (2): 309–356. doi:10.1515/byzs.1909.18.2.309. – Mercati wrote pp. 323–334, "II. L'inno Ὡς ἐνώπιος (Πένθος τῇ κυριακῇ ἑσπέρας)".
- Mercati, Giuseppe (1909–1910). "The Apocalypse of Sedrach". JTHS. 11 (4): 572–573. doi:10.1093/jts/os-XI.4.572.
- Mercati, Sylvius Ioseph (Silvio Giuseppe), ed. (1915). S. Ephraem Syri opera. Monumenta Biblica et Ecclesiastica. Vol. 1: Sermones in Abraham et Isaac, in Basilium Magnum, in Eliam. Rome: Pontificium Institutum Biblicum.
- Mercati, Silvio Giuseppe (1915). "De nonnullis versibus dodecasyllabis S. Germani I CP Patriarchae homiliae Εἰς τὰ εἰσόδια τῆς Θεοτόκου insertis". Roma e l'Oriente. 5 (53–54): 145–165.
- Mercati, Silvio Giuseppe (1916). "Vita giambica di S. Nicola di Mira secondo il codice Messinese 30". Roma e l'Oriente. 6 (65–66): 232–241.
- Mercati, Silvio Giuseppe (1917). "Ancora intorno a Μιχαὴλ γραμματικὸς ὁ ἱερομοναχός". Bessarione. 21: 348–363.
- Mercati, Silvio Giuseppe (1917). "Iacobi Bulgariae Archiepiscopi Opuscula". Bessarione. 21: 73–89, 208–227.
- Mercati, Silvio Giuseppe (1917). "Intorno a Μιχαὴλ γραμματικὸς ὁ ἱερομοναχός". Bessarione. 21: 199–207.
- Mercati, Silvio Giuseppe (1918). "Sulle poesie di Niceforo Gregora". Bessarione. 22: 90–98.
- Mercati, Silvio Giuseppe (1919–1920). "Sull'ἀνικηώρων γένος dell'acrostico di Giuliana Anicia nel codice viennese di Dioscoride". Rivista degli Studi Orientali. 8 (1–4): 427–431.
- Mercati, Silvio Giuseppe (1920). "Antica omelia greca εἰς τὴν Χριστοῦ γεννᾶν". Biblica. 1 (1): 75–90.
- Mercati, Silvio Giuseppe (1920). "Il prologo della Catomyomachia di Teodoro Prodromo è imitato da Gregorio Nazianzeno, Epist. IV (Migne PG 37, col. 25B)". BZ. 24 (1): 28.
- Mercati, Silvio Giuseppe (1920). "Note d'Epigrafia Bizantina (1–4)". Bessarione. 24: 192–205.
- Mercati, Silvio Giuseppe (1920). "Note papirologiche (1.–2.)". Biblica. 1 (2): 270–271.
- Mercati, Silvio Giuseppe (1920). "Note papirologiche (3.)". Biblica. 1 (3): 371–375.
- Mercati, Silvio Giuseppe (1920). "Note papirologiche (4.)". Biblica. 2 (2): 229–239.
- Mercati, Silvio Giuseppe (1921). "Note d'Epigrafia Bizantina (5–10)". Bessarione. 25: 136–162.
- Mercati, Silvio Giuseppe (1923–1925). "Intorno all'autore del carme εἰς τὰ Πυθίοις θερμά (Leone Magistro Choirosphaktes)". Rivista degli Studi Orientali. 10 (2–4): 212–248.
- Mercati, Silvio Giuseppe (1931). "Le mie esperienze rabdomantiche. Come diventai rabdomante". Primo convegno italiano di Rabdomanzia per l'utilizzazione delle acque in agricoltura. Verona: Editrice Arena. pp. 48–55.
- Mercati, Silvio Giuseppe (1936). "Santuari e reliquie costantinopolitane secondo il codice Ottoboniano latino 169 prima della conquista latina (1204)". Rendiconti della Pontificia Accademia Romana di Archeologia. 12: 133–156.
- Mercati, Silvio Giuseppe (1941). "Vita di S. Nifone riconosciuta nel papiro greco Fitz Roy Fenwick a Cheltenham, già Lambruschini a Firenze". Aegyptus. 21 (1–2): 55–92. JSTOR 41214359.
- Mercati, Silvio Giuseppe (1955–1957). "Intorno al titolo dei lessici di Suida-Suda e di Papia". Byzantion. 25–27 (1): 173–193. JSTOR 44170038.
- Mercati, Silvio Giuseppe (1962). "Nota a due passi del canone di Sant' Andrea di Creta per San Giorgio (v. 276 e 342)". Byzantion. 32 (1): 311–312. JSTOR 44169047.
- Mercati, Silvio Giuseppe (1964). Mélanges E. Tisserant. Studi e Testi, 233. Vol. III: Orient Chrétien (deuxième partie). Città del Vaticano: Biblioteca Apostolica Vaticana. pp. 77–84.
- Mercati, Silvio Giuseppe (1970). Acconcia Longo, Augusta (ed.). Collectanea Byzantina. Vol. I–II. Bari: Dedalo. – Scripta minora.

== Bibliography ==
- Atti del V Congresso Internazionale di Studi Bizantini (Roma 20–26 settembre 1936). Studi Bizantini e Neoellenici, 5. Vol. I: Storia – Filologia – Diritto. Rome: Tipografia del Senato. 1939.
- Atti del V Congresso Internazionale di Studi Bizantini (Roma 20–26 settembre 1936). Studi Bizantini e Neoellenici, 6. Vol. II: Archeologia e Storia dell'Arte – Liturgia e musica – Cronaca del Congresso. Rome: Tipografia del Senato. 1940.
- Atti dello VIII Congresso Internazionale di Studi Bizantini (Palermo 3–10 aprile 1951). Studi Bizantini e Neoellenici, 7. Vol. I: Filologia – Letteratura – Linguistica – Storia – Numismatica. Rome: Associazione Nazionale di Studi Bizantini. 1953.
- Atti dello VIII Congresso Internazionale di Studi Bizantini (Palermo 3–10 aprile 1951). Studi Bizantini e Neoellenici, 8. Vol. II: Agiografia – Archeologia – Arte – Diritto – Liturgia – Musica. Rome: Associazione Nazionale di Studi Bizantini. 1953.
- Dujčev, Ivan (1964). "Silvio Giuseppe Mercati e il suo contributo agli studi bizantini". RCCM. 6: 303–315. (Obituary)
- Follieri, Enrica (1997) [1989]. "La filologia bizantina in Italia nel secolo XX". In Acconcia Longo, Augusta; Perria, Lidia; Luzzi, Andrea (eds.). Byzantina et Italograeca. Studi di filologia e di paleografia. Storia e Letteratura: Raccolta di Studi e Testi, 195. Rome: Edizioni di Storia e Letteratura. pp. 3–39. ISBN 978-8-890-01384-3.
- Follieri, Enrica (1964). "Silvio Giuseppe Mercati". Byzantion. 34 (1): 5–9. JSTOR 44169194. (Obituary)
- Follieri, Enrica (1971). "Bibliographical announcement of Collectanea byzantina (1970)". BZ. 64 (2): 422.
- Mercati, Silvio Giuseppe (1911). "Cenno riassuntivo degli studi fatti e della carriera didattica percorsa". Collectanea byzantina (1970). pp. vii–x. – Schirò and Acconcia Longo reprinted a curriculum vitae written by Mercati in 1911.
- Schirò, Giuseppe (1964a). "Attività scientifica di Silvio Giuseppe Mercati". RSBN. 1: 15–29.
- Schirò, Giuseppe (1964b). "Ricordo di Silvio Giuseppe Mercati". Byzantion. 34 (1): 11–16. JSTOR 44169195. (Obituary)
- Schirò, Giuseppe; Zoras, Giorgio (1964). "Silvio Giuseppe Mercati". RSBN. 1: 5. (Obituary)
- Vian, Paolo (2009). "Giuseppe Mercati". Dizionario Biografico degli Italiani.
