= Bruno Gentili =

Italian classical philologist (1915–2014)

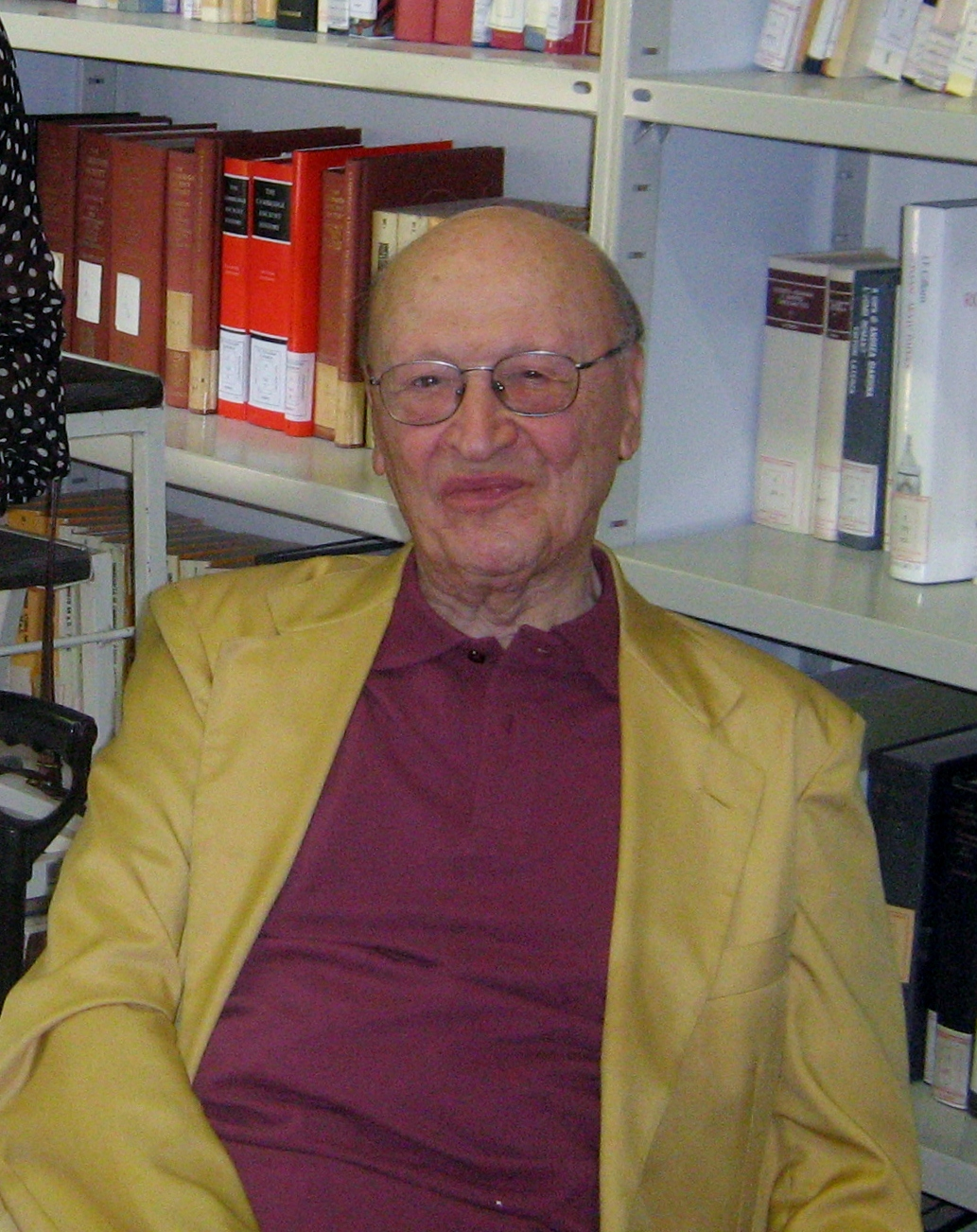
Gentili in 2007 at the University of Urbino.

Bruno Gentili OMRI (20 November 1915 – 7 January 2014) was an Italian classical scholar and philologist, Emeritus at the University of Urbino.

A prolific scholar, Gentili was an expert of Ancient Greek poetry and metre.

== Biography ==
Born in Valmontone, Gentili spent his youth in Abruzzo and graduated from the Liceo Classico "Ovidio" in Sulmona. He enrolled in the Sapienza University of Rome, where he studied Greek Literature under Ettore Romagnoli and Byzantine Philology under Silvio Giuseppe Mercati. He graduated, tutored by Mercati, with a thesis in Byzantine Philology on the topic "Studio critico intorno alla storia di Agatia e alla sua tradizione manoscritta" [A Critical Study around Agathias' History and Its Manuscript Transmission]. Soon after graduation, Gentili became assistant to Gennaro Perrotta (Romagnoli's successor), teaching Greek and Latin Metre.

In 1956 Gentili became professor of Greek literature in the newly founded Faculty of Humanities of the University of Urbino, explicitly nominated by the chancellor Carlo Bo. He was nominated emeritus soon after his retirement (1991).

Gentili died aged 98 in Rome in 2014. His wife was Franca Perusino, Emerita of Classical Philology at the University of Urbino.

== Research ==
Gentili was a specialist of Ancient Greek poetry and metre. He wrote extensively on poets such as Alcman, Anacreon, Bacchylides and Pindar, and was recognized as a major expert of Greek metre. In 1950 he published his first monograph on the topic, which became one of his lines of research; his 1952 book on the subject, La metrica dei Greci, was re-edited and augmented in 2003 in collaboration with Liana Lomiento. In 1999 he and Franca Perusino edited a monograph on ancient Greek colometry. He studied Greek tragedy and ancient historiography and Roman culture, co-writing a history of Latin literature.

Gentili also worked as critical editor of Greek texts. In 1958, other than publishing a volume of studies on Bacchylides, he edited the fragments of Anacreon. His major critical work is the Teubner collection, edited with Carlo Prato, of all the extant fragments of the Greek elegiac poets. Starting from the 1990s, he promoted the critical edition, with Italian translation and philological commentary, of Pindar's odes.

In 1965 he and Perrotta co-edited an anthology of archaic Greek poetry, which became a widely used textbook in Italian schools.

== Publications ==
- Gentili, Bruno (1944). "I codici e le edizioni delle "Storie" di Agatia". Bullettino dell'Istituto Storico Italiano per Il Medio Evo e Archivio Muratoriano. 58: 163–176.
- Perrotta, Gennaro; Gentili, Bruno, eds. (1948). Polinnia. Lirica greca arcaica. Messina – Firenze: Casa Editrice G. D'Anna.
  - Gentili, Bruno, ed. (1965). Polinnia. Lirica greca arcaica (2nd ed.). Messina – Firenze: Casa Editrice G. D'Anna.
  - Gentili, Bruno; Catenacci, Carmine, eds. (2007). Polinnia. Lirica greca arcaica (3rd ed.). Messina – Firenze: Casa Editrice G. D'Anna.
- Gentili, Bruno (1950). Metrica greca arcaica. Messina – Firenze: Casa Editrice G. D'Anna.
- Gentili, Bruno (1952). La metrica dei Greci. Messina – Firenze: Casa Editrice G. D'Anna.
- Gentili, Bruno, ed. (1958). Anacreon. Romae: in aedibus Athenei.
- Gentili, Bruno (1958). Bacchilide. Studi. Urbino: S. T. E. U.
- Gentili, Bruno; Cerri, Giovanni (1975). Le teorie del discorso storico nel pensiero greco e la storiografia romana arcaica. Roma: Edizioni dell'Ateneo.
- Gentili, Bruno; Pasoli, Elio; Simonetti, Manlio (1976). Storia della letteratura latina. Roma – Bari: Laterza.
  - Gentili, Bruno; Stupazzini, Luciano; Simonetti, Manlio (1987). Storia della letteratura latina (2nd ed.). Roma – Bari: Laterza.
- Gentili, Bruno (1977). Lo spettacolo nel mondo antico. Teatro ellenistico e teatro romano arcaico. Roma – Bari: Laterza.
  - Gentili, Bruno (2006). Lo spettacolo nel mondo antico. Teatro ellenistico e teatro romano arcaico (2nd ed.). Roma: Bulzoni. ISBN 978-8-878-70092-5.
- Gentili, Bruno (1981). "Eric R. Dodds mentitore?". Quaderni Urbinati di Cultura Classica. 7 (31): 175–176. doi:10.2307/20538671. JSTOR 20538671.
- Gentili, Bruno; Cerri, Giovanni (1983). Storia e biografia nel pensiero antico. Roma – Bari: Laterza.
- Gentili, Bruno; Prato, Carolus (Carlo), eds. (1988) [1st ed. 1979]. Poetarum elegiacorum Graecorum testimonia et fragmenta. Vol. I (2nd ed.). Leipzig: BSB B. G. Teubner Verlagsgesellschaft. ISBN 3-322-00457-0.
- Gentili, Bruno; Perusino, Franca, eds. (1999). La colometria antica dei testi poetici greci. Pisa – Roma: Istituti Editoriali e Poligrafici Internazionali.
- Gentili, Bruno; Lomiento, Liana (2003). Metrica e ritmica. Storia delle forme poetiche nella Grecia antica. Milano: Mondadori Università. ISBN 88-882-4208-2.
- Gentili, Bruno; Prato, Carolus (Carlo), eds. (2002) [1st ed. 1985]. Poetarum elegiacorum Graecorum testimonia et fragmenta. Vol. II (2nd ed.). Berlin - New York: Walter de Gruyter GmbH. ISBN 978-3-598-71702-4.
- Pindaro (2012) [1st ed. 1995]. Gentili, Bruno; Angeli Bernardini, Paola; Cingano, Ettore; Giannini, Pietro (eds.). Le Pitiche (5 ed.). Roma – Milano: Fondazione Lorenzo Valla – Arnoldo Mondadori Editore. ISBN 978-88-04-39143-2.
- Pindaro (2013). Gentili, Bruno; Catenacci, Carmine; Giannini, Pietro; Lomiento, Liana (eds.). Le Olimpiche. Roma – Milano: Fondazione Lorenzo Valla – Arnoldo Mondadori Editore. ISBN 978-88-04-62712-8.

== Honors ==
- Accademia Nazionale dei Lincei: National membership (1989) — previously: correspondent (1984).
- Order of Merit of the Italian Republic — Grand Officer (2nd Class) (1989).
- Honorary degrees:
  - University of Southampton (1978)
  - University of Lausanne (1983)
  - Katholieke Universiteit Leuven (1987)
  - Complutense University of Madrid (2000)

== Bibliography ==
- Angeli Bernardini, Paola (2014). "Bruno Gentili †". Gnomon. 86 (5): 476–479. JSTOR 24774683. (Obituary)
- Catenacci, Carmine (2014). "Ricordo di Bruno Gentili" (PDF). Eikasmós. 25: 447–454. (Obituary)
- Musti, Domenico. "Gentili, Bruno". Dizionario Biografico degli Italiani.
