= San Giorgio in Velabro =

- Church of Saint George in the Velabrum
- Chiesa di San Giorgio in Velabro
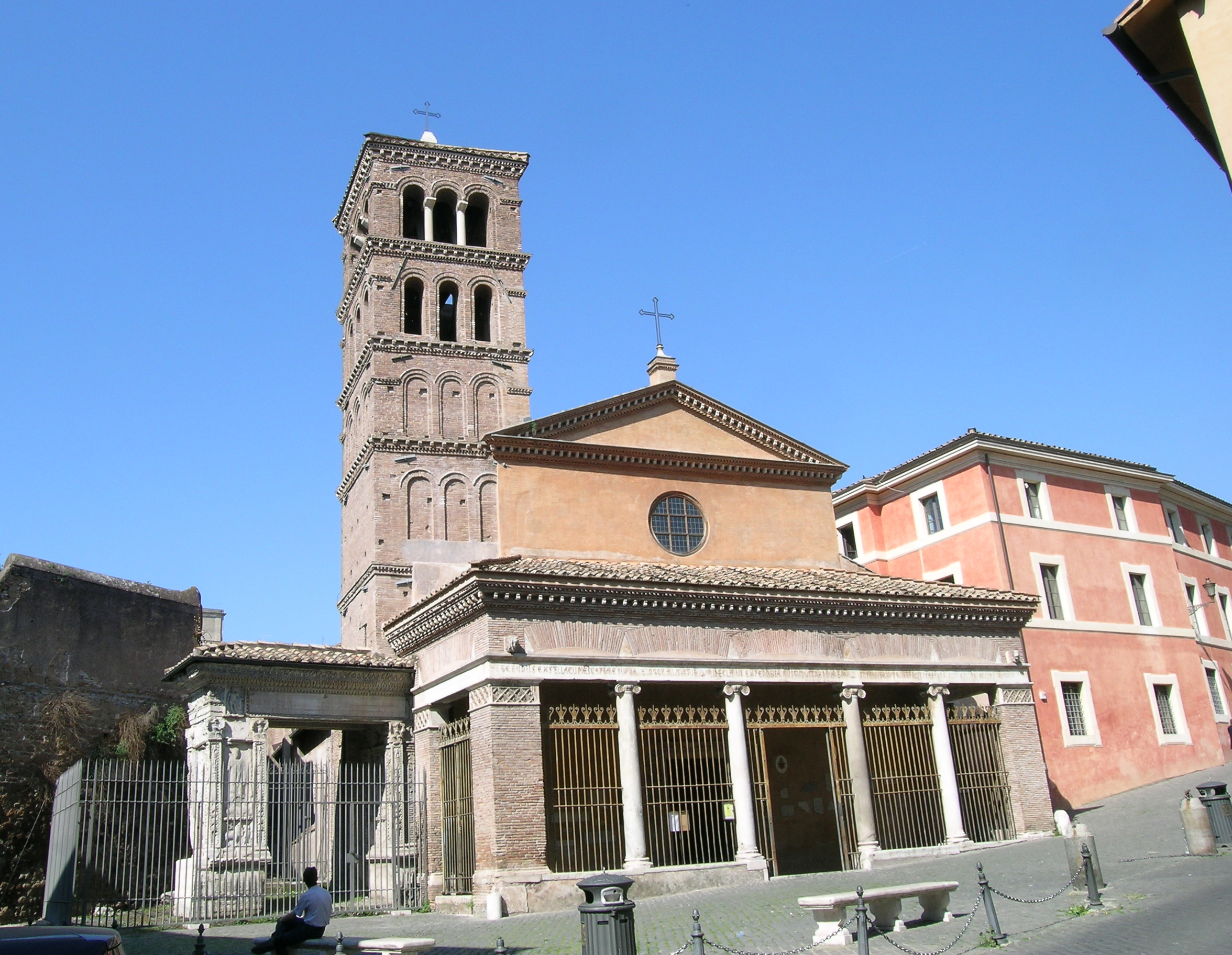
- Click on the map for a fullscreen view
- 41°53′22.31″N 12°28′59.29″E
- Location: Via del Velabro 19, Rome
- Country: Italy
- Language: Italian
- Denomination: Catholic
- Tradition: Roman Rite
- Religious order: Canons Regular of the Order of the Holy Cross
- Website: sangiorgioinvelabro.com

History
- Status: titular church
- Dedication: Saint George

Architecture
- Style: Paleochristian, Romanesque
- Groundbreaking: 7th century AD

Administration
- Diocese: Rome

S. Giorgio can be seen in the View of the Cloaca Maxima, Rome by Christoffer Wilhelm Eckersberg.

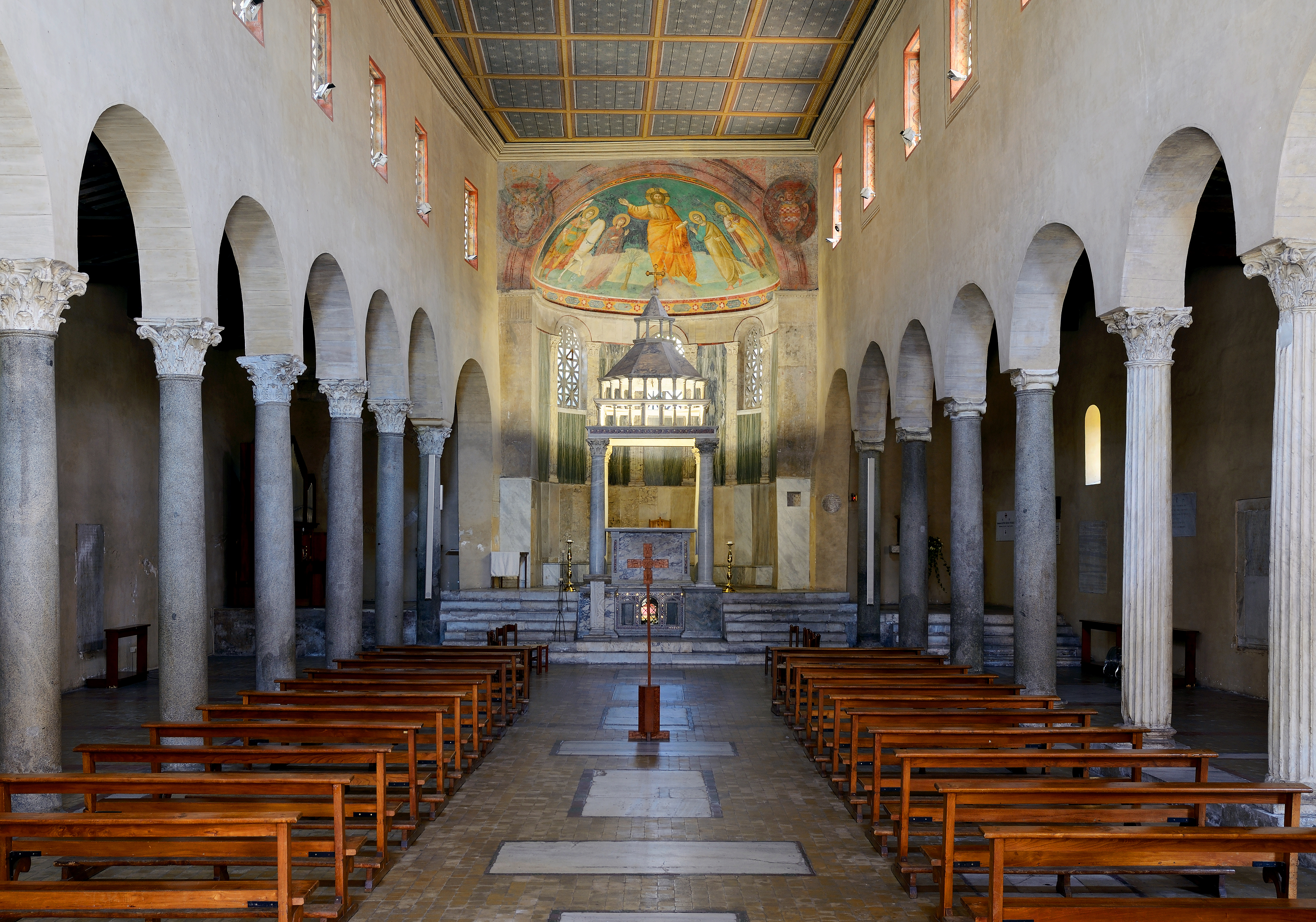
Interior of San Giorgio

San Giorgio in Velabro is a Catholic church dedicated to St. George on Via del Velabro in the historic center of Rome in the Velabrum and the Ripa district. The church—the result of the 9th century expansion of a previous diaconal building and subsequent remodeling—stands near the Arch of Janus in the small square of the Cloaca Maxima. The location of S. Giorgio is not far from the place where the founding legend of Rome places the discovery of the twins Romulus and Remus by the she-wolf. The façade of the church encroaches upon and incorporates the Arcus Argentariorum, which was completed in 204 AD.

S. Giorgo falls within the territory of the parish of Santa Maria in Portico in Campitelli and is a rectory entrusted to the Canons Regular of the Order of the Holy Cross as well as a titular church, whose cardinal-deacons over the years have included Pope Boniface IX and Pope Martin V, as well as Pierre de Luxembourg (pseudocardinal of the Antipope Clement VII) and Saint John Henry Newman.

San Giorgio in Velabro is the station church for the first Thursday in Lent, established as such by Pope Gregory II.

== History ==
An inscription, dated in 461 or 482, found in the catacombs of St. Callixtus, probably refers of a church in the same zone, "LOCVS AVGVSTI LECTORIS DE BELABRV", though there is nothing to connect the lector with S. Giorgio.

The first religious building attested in the place of the current church is a diaconia, funded by Pope Gregory I. In September or October 598, Pope Gregory wrote to the abbot Marinianus, that, since his monastery was next door to the church of Saint George «Ad sedem», and since the church had fallen into decay, he granted the church to the monastery provided that they repair and keep up the premises, and solemnly observe the liturgical offices. This has been taken as a reference to S. Giorgio in Velabro, though, as Batiffol points out, nowhere else is the phrase «Ad sedem» connected with the Velabrum or San Giorgio. Additionally, the restoration of the church is to be for the purpose of liturgical celebrations, and is to belong to the monastery in perpetuity, not to a cardinal deacon for diaconal activities.

The church was inside the Greek quarter of Rome, where Greek-speaking merchants, civil and military officers and monks of the Byzantine Empire lived — the nearby Santa Maria in Cosmedin, for example, was known as in Schola Graeca at the time.

The current church was built during the 7th century, possibly by Pope Leo II (682–683), who dedicated it to Saint Sebastian, who was martyred in this area and his corpse was thrown into the Cloaca Maxima.

Pope Zachary (741–752), who was of Greek origin, moved the relic of St. George to here from Cappadocia, so that this saint had a church dedicated in the West well before the spreading of his worship with the return of the Crusaders from the East. The relics of St. George are kept under the main altar.

In 1347, the Roman patriot Cola Di Rienzo posted a manifesto announcing the liberation of Rome on the doors of this church.

In 1610–1611 Cardinal-deacon Giacomo Serra commissioned extensive restoration and invited Discalced Augustinians from his hometown of Genoa to take over management of the church.

At midnight on 27 July 1993, a car bomb parked close to the façade exploded. While the explosion caused no fatalities, it left the 12th century portico almost totally collapsed and blew a large opening into the wall of the main church. Serious damage was also inflicted on the residence next door of the Generalate of the Crosiers (Canons Regular of the Order of the Holy Cross).

== Restorations ==
The church's plan is irregular, indeed slightly trapezoidal, as a result of the frequent additions to the building. As can be seen from the image above, the interior columns are not identical, having been taken and repurposed as spolia from sundry Roman temples.

After a restoration of Pope Gregory IV (9th century), the church received the addition of the portico—donated by Stefano Stella—and of the tower bell in the first half of the 13th century. The apse was decorated with frescoes by Pietro Cavallini in the 13th century (Christ Flanked by Mary and Saints Peter, George and Sebastian).

Between 1923 and 1926, the Superintendent of Monuments of Rome, Antonio Muñoz, completed a more radical restoration programme, with the aim of restoring the building's "medieval character" and freeing it from later additions. This was done by returning the floor to its original level (and so exposing the column bases) reopening the ancient windows that gave light to the central nave, restoring the apsis, and generally removing numerous accretions from the other most recent restorations. During this process, fragments (now displayed on the internal walls) were found, which indicated that a schola cantorum had existed on the site, which could be attributed to the period of Pope Gregory IV.

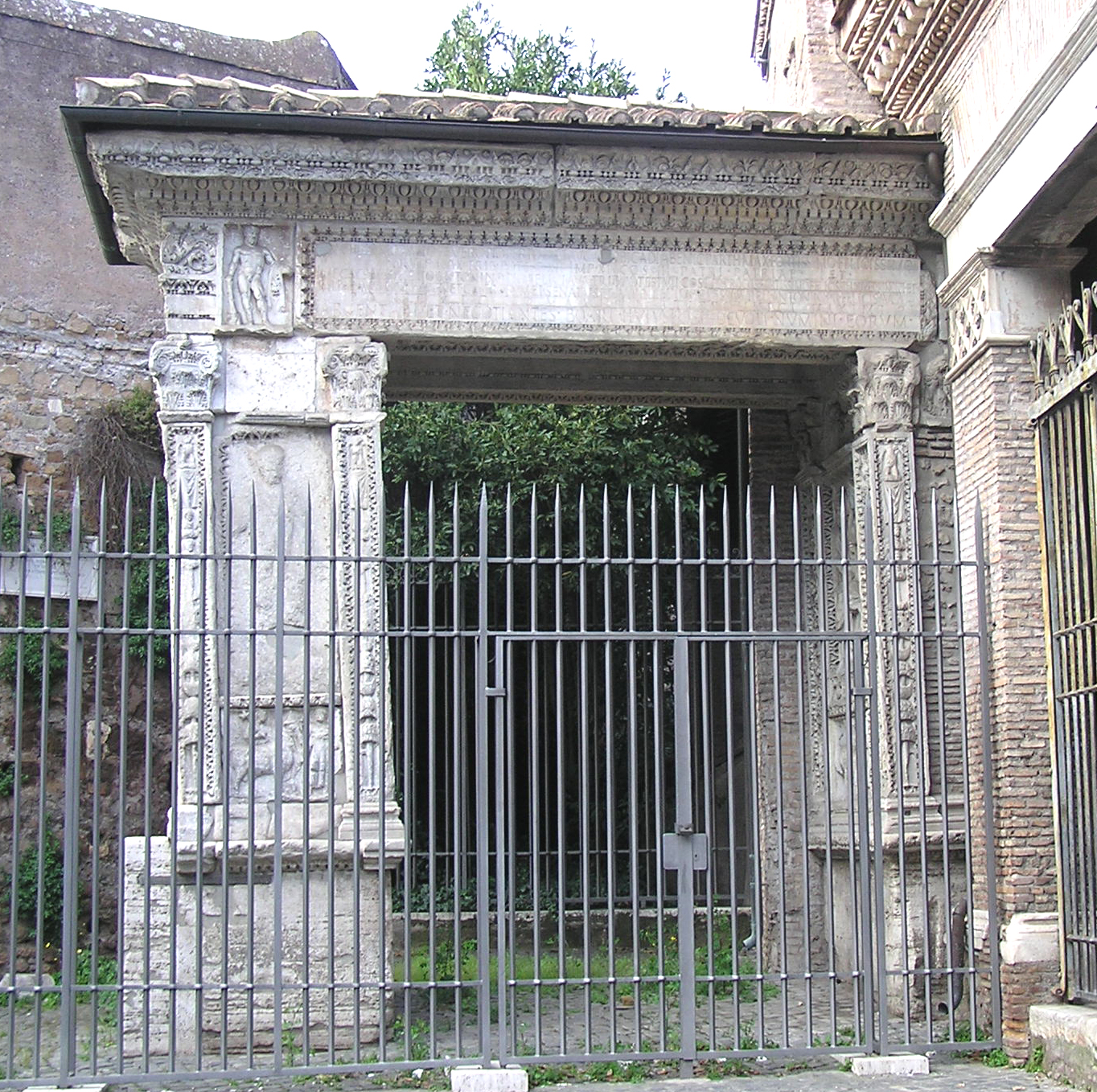
The Arcus Argentariorum (or Arch of Septimius Severus) on the Forum Boarium next to S. Giorgio

The building as we see it today is largely a product of the 1920s restoration. However, the 1993 explosion required five years' further restoration. That explosion left the 12th century portico almost totally collapsed and blew a large opening into the wall of the main church. The Ministry of Cultural Heritage catalogued what was damaged or destroyed, placing the fragments in 1,050 crates. Experts researched dates and locational references before restoring the building with them, although some details, particularly in the portico, were deliberately left unrestored as a memorial to the bombing.

== Gallery ==
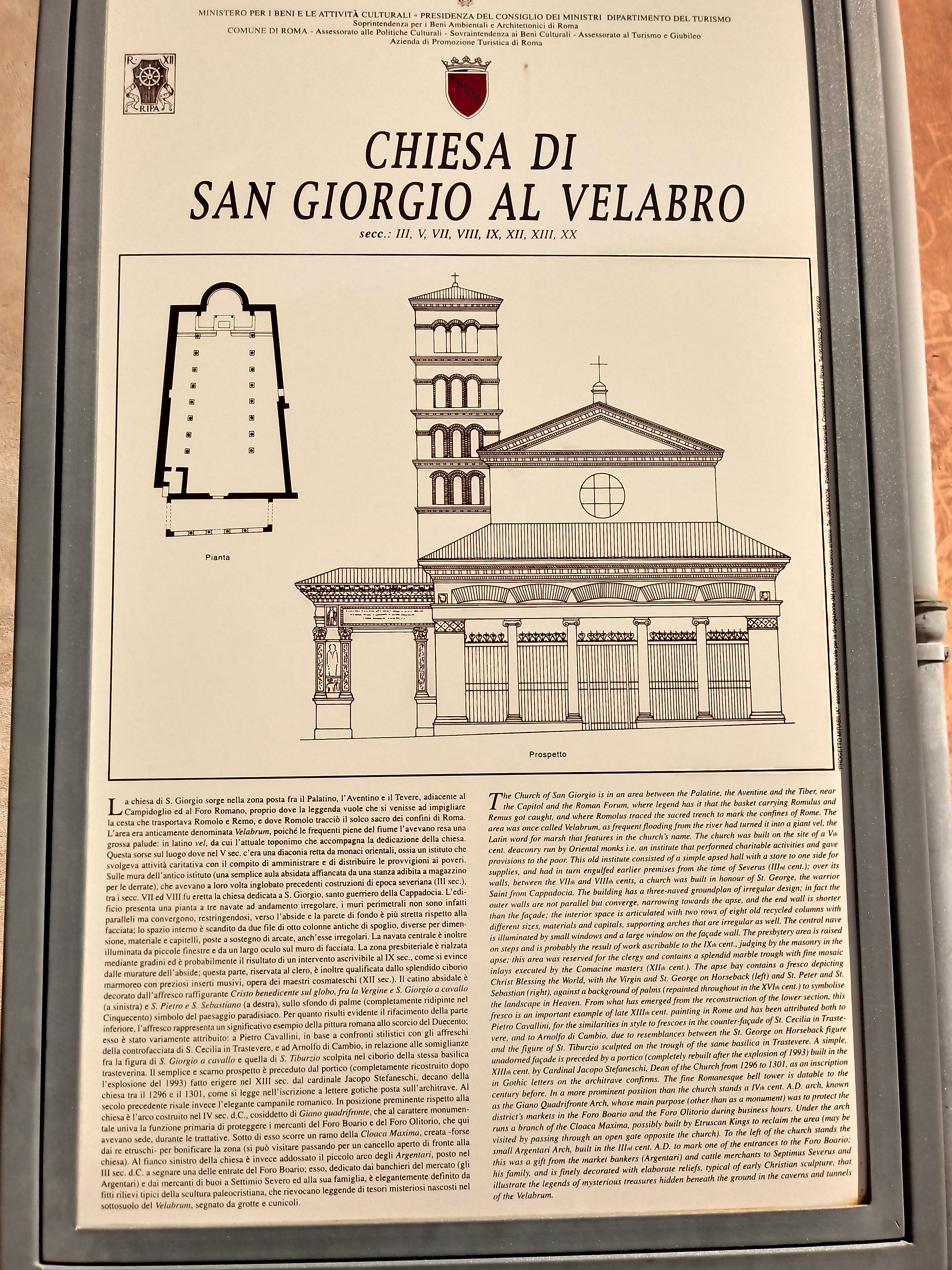

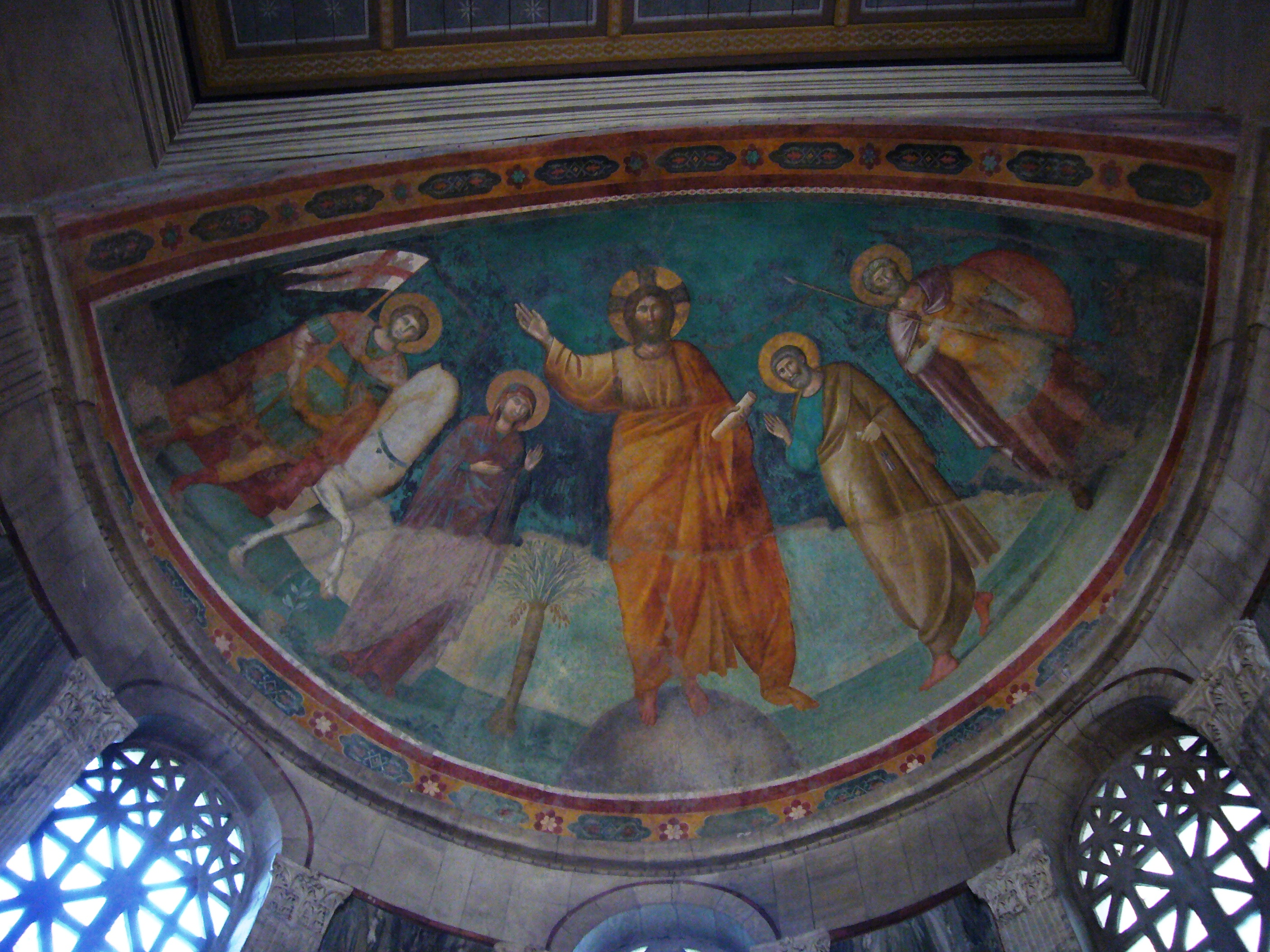
Apse

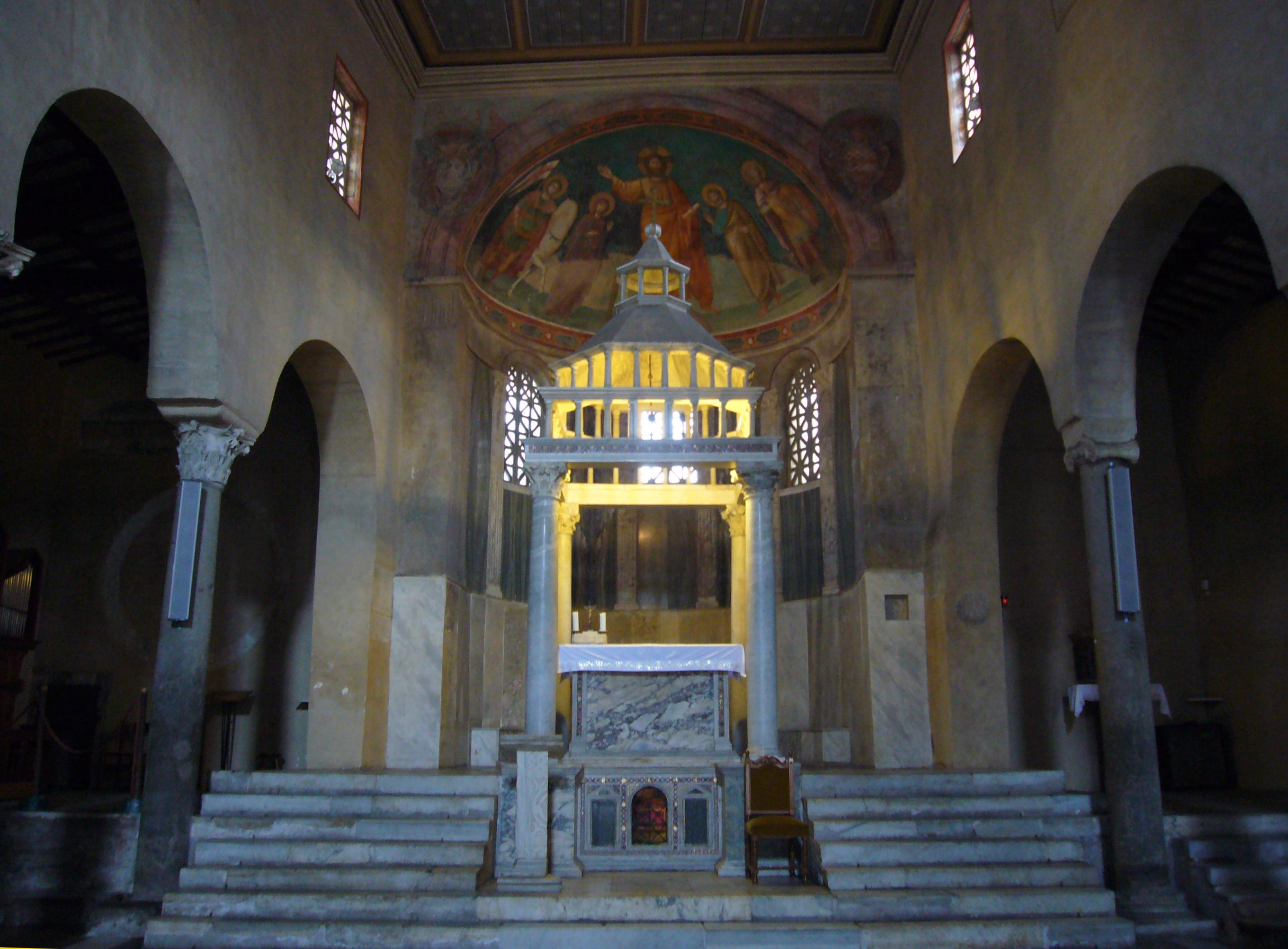
Altar

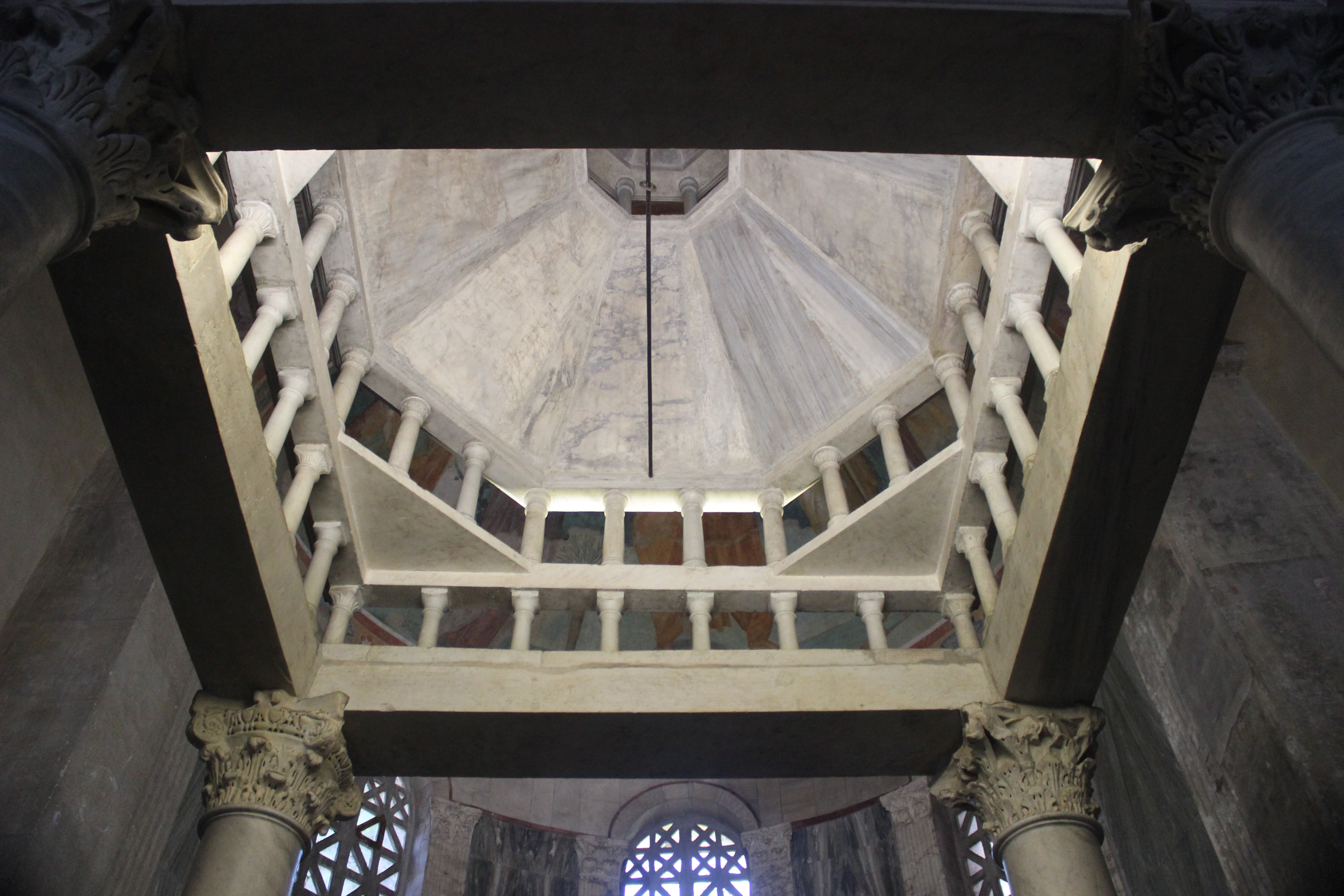
Baldachin

== Cardinal-Deacons ==
The church was established as a Deaconry in the reign of Pope Gregory I (590–604).

- Roscemanno, O.S.B.Cas. (c. 1112 – c. 1128))
- Odone Fattiboni (1132–1161)
- Gerardus (1162) (a creation of Victor IV)
- Manfred (1163–1173)
- Rainerius (1175–1182)
- Radulfus Nigellus (1185–c. 1190)
- Gregorius de Monte Carello (1190–1210)
- Bertinus (Bertramus) (1212–1216)
- Pietro Capuano iuniore (1219–1236)
- Petrus Capoccius (1244–1250)
- Gaufridus of Alatri (1261–1287)
- Petrus Peregressus (1288–1289)
- Giacomo Stefaneschi (1295–1341)
- Giovanni de Caramagno (1350–1361)
- Guillaume Bragose (1361–1362)
- Giacomo Orsini (1371–1379) (Avignon Obedience, in 1378)
- Perinus Tomacelli (1381–1385) (Roman Obedience)
- Pierre de Luxembourg (1384–1387) (Avignon Obedience)
- Galeozzo Tarlati de Petramala (1388–1400) (Avignon Obedience)
- Michael de Salva (1404–1406) (Avignon Obedience)
- Carolus de Urries (1408–1420) (Avignon Obedience)
- Oddone Colonna (1405–1417), later Pope Martin V.
- Prospero Colonna (1426–1463)

vacant (1464–1476)

- Raffaele Riario (1477–1480)

vacant (1481–1516)

- Franciotto Orsini (1517–1519)
- Girolamo Grimaldi (1528–1543)
- Girolamo Recanati de Capodiferro (1545–1559)
- Giovanni Antonio Serbelloni (1560–1565)
- Markus Sitticus von Hohenems Altemps (1565–1577)
- Giovanni Vincenzo Gonzaga (1578–1583)
- Francesco Sforza di Santa Fiora (1584–1585)
- Benedetto Giustiniani (1587, Jan.–Sept.)
- Ottavio Acquaviva d'Aragona (1591–1593)
- Cinzio Aldobrandini (1593–1605)
- Orazio Maffei (1606–1607)
- Giacomo Serra (1611–1615)
- Pietro Maria Borghese (1624–1626)
- Giovanni Stefano Donghi (1643–1655)
- Paolo Emilio Rondinini (1655–1656)
- Giancarlo de' Medici (1656–1663)
- Angelo Celsi (1664–1668)
- Paolo Savelli (1669–1670; 1678–1683)
- Sigismondo Chigi (1670–1678)
- Fulvio Astalli (1686–1688)
- Gasparo Cavalieri (1688–1689)
- Giuseppe Renato Imperiali (1690–1726–1732)
- Agapito Mosca (1732–1743)
- Prospero Colonna di Sciarra (1743–1756)
- Niccolò Perelli (1759–1772)
- Antonio Casali (1773–1777)
- Romoaldo Guidi (1778–1780)
- Vincenzo Maria Altieri (1781–1787)
- Giovanni Rinuccini (1794–1801)

vacant (1802–1822)

- Tommaso Riario Sforza (1823)

vacant (1824–1837)

- Giuseppe Ugolini (1838)

vacant (1839–1855)

- Francesco de' Medici di Ottaiano (1856–1857)

vacant (1858–1865)

- Antonio Matteucci (1866)

vacant (1867–1873)

- Tommaso Martinelli (1874–1875)
- John Henry Newman (1879–1890)

vacant (1891–1913)

- Francis Aidan Gasquet (1914–1915)
- Luigi Sincero (1923–1928–1933)
- Giovanni Mercati (1936–1957)
- André-Damien-Ferdinand Jullien (1958–1964)
- Benno Gut, O.S.B. (1967–1970)
- Sergio Pignedoli (1973–1980)
- Alfons Maria Stickler (1985–2007)
- Gianfranco Ravasi (2010– )

== See also ==
- St George's Church (disambiguation), for a list of other churches worldwide of the same name.

== Bibliography ==
- Batiffol, Pierre (1887), "Inscriptions byzantines de St-Georges au Vélabre," (in French) Mélanges d'archéologie et d'histoire VII (Paris: E. Thorin 1887), pp. 419–431.
- Bräuer, Martin (2014). Handbuch der Kardinäle: 1846-2012 (in German). Berlin: De Gruyter. ISBN 978-3-11-026947-5.
- Cozza-Luzi, Giuseppe (1899), "Velabrensia. Studio storico critico sulla chiesa di S. Giorgio in Velabro. Sue memorie ed epigrafe," Bessarione Anno IV, Vol. VI (Roma: E. Loescher 1899), pp. 58–95.
- Eubel, Conradus, ed. (1913). Hierarchia catholica (in Latin). Vol. Tomus 1 (second ed.). Münster: Libreria Regensbergiana. (in Latin)
- Eubel, Conradus, ed. (1914). Hierarchia catholica (in Latin). Vol. Tomus 2 (second ed.). Münster: Libreria Regensbergiana.
- Eubel, Conradus; Gulik, Guilelmus, eds. (1923). Hierarchia catholica (in Latin). Vol. Tomus 3 (second ed.). Münster: Libreria Regensbergiana.
- Federico di San Pietro, Memorie istoriche del sacro tempio, o sia Diaconia di San Giorgio in Velabro (Roma: Paolo Giunchi 1791).
- Gauchat, Patritius (Patrice) (1935). Hierarchia catholica. Vol. Tomus IV (1592-1667). Münster: Libraria Regensbergiana.
- Giannettini, A. and C. Venanzi, S. Giorgio al Velabro (Roma: Marietti, 1967).
- Gurco, Maria Grazia (2003). "The Church of St. George in Velabrum in Rome: techniques of construction, materials and historical transformations," Proceedings of the First International Congress on Construction History (ed. Santiago Huerta) (Madrid 2003) Vol. 3, pp. 2009–2013.
- Lentz, Harris M. (2009). Popes and Cardinals of the 20th Century: A Biographical Dictionary. Jefferson NC USA: McFarland. ISBN 978-1-4766-2155-5.
- Antonio Muñoz (1935). Il restauro della basilica di S. Giorgio al Velabro in Roma (Roma: Società editrice d'arte illustrata, 1926).
- Ritzler, Remigius; Sefrin, Pirminus (1952). Hierarchia catholica medii et recentis aevi. Vol. Tomus V (1667–1730). Patavii: Messagero di S. Antonio.
- Ritzler, Remigius; Sefrin, Pirminus (1958). Hierarchia catholica medii et recentis aevi. Vol. Tomus VI (1730–1799). Patavii: Messagero di S. Antonio.
