= Jacob Blessing the Sons of Joseph (Guercino) =

Painting by Guercino

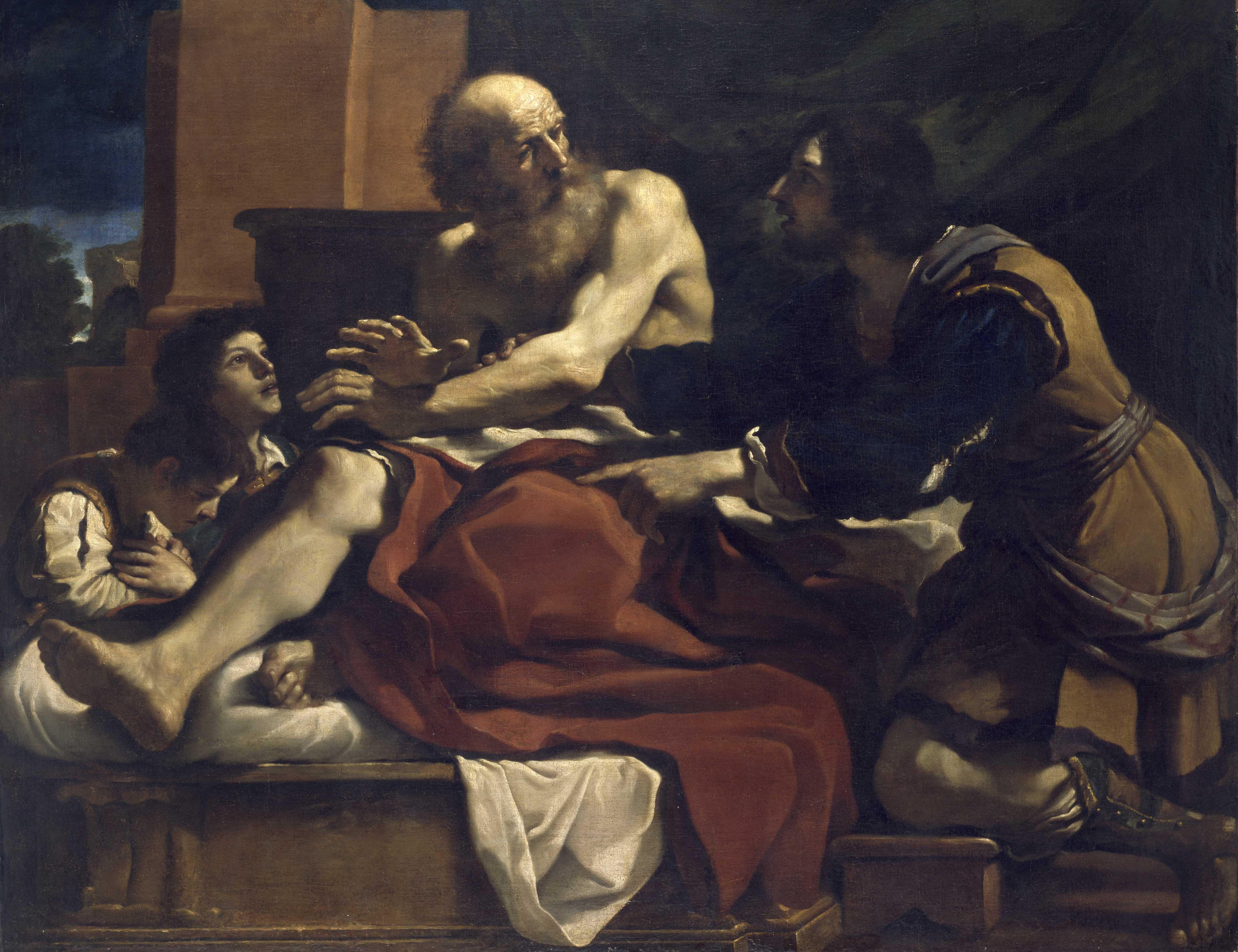
Jacob Blessing the Sons of Joseph (ca. 1620) by Guercino

Jacob Blessing the Sons of Joseph is an oil-on-canvas painting created ca. 1620 by the Italian Baroque artist Guercino, now in the National Gallery of Ireland. It depicts the Biblical story of Jacob blessing his grandsons Manasseh and Ephraim, with the boys' father Joseph on the right protesting that the primary right-handed blessing has been given to the second-born (Ephraim) not first-born (Manasseh) son.

== History ==
The earliest surviving sketch for it is a 1615–1625 pen-and-brown-ink study with washes in the Art Institute Chicago. The work was originally commissioned by Guercino's frequent patron cardinal Jacopo Serra, papal legate at Ferrara, passing after his death in 1623 to cardinal Giulio Sacchetti, his successor as legate to Ferrara and it was seen in 1629 by Diego Velázquez during a visit to Italy.

Sacchetti in the 1640s gave it to Don Juan Alfonso Enriquez de Cabrera, Spain's ambassador to Pope Innocent X, whose son bequeathed it to San Pascual Bailon, a church in Madrid. It was next acquired around 1803 by Manuel Godoy but after his imprisonment and exile five years later it was sold on again. A copy made sometime before 1808 is now held by the National Trust at Ickworth House in Suffolk. By 1843 the original work had reached the collection of John Rushout, 2nd Baron Northwick, in whose posthumous sale it was placed back on the market in 1859.

Its fate for the next seventy years is unknown, but it was found again in Paris in 1932 by Hermann Voss and bought two years later for only £120 by Denis Mahon, who placed it on long-term loan to the National Gallery of Ireland in 1997 and finally presented it to its present home in 2008 via the British Fund for the National Gallery of Ireland. It was sent for extensive restoration at the Getty Museum in 2016–2018.
