= Giovanni Mercati =

Italian Catholic cardinal

His Eminence Giovanni Mercati
- Archivist of the Vatican Secret Archives; Librarian of the Vatican Apostolic Library
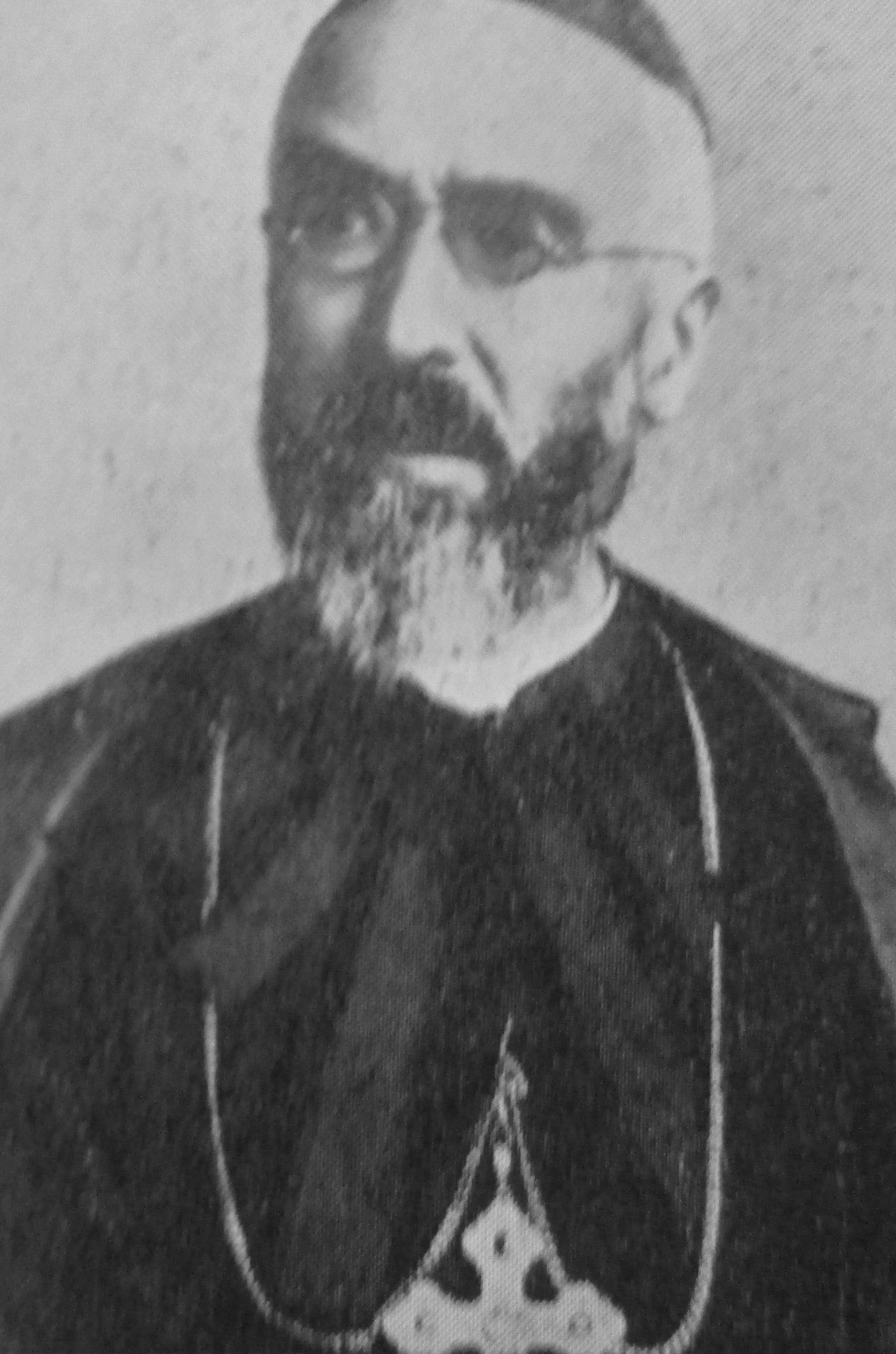
- Church: Roman Catholic Church
- Appointed: 18 June 1936
- Term ended: 23 August 1957
- Predecessor: Franziskus Ehrle
- Successor: Eugène Tisserant
- Other post: Cardinal-Deacon of San Giorgio in Velabro (1936–57)
- Previous posts: Prefect of the Vatican Apostolic Library (1919–36); Camerlengo of the College of Cardinals (1951–52)

Orders
- Ordination: 21 September 1889 by Vincenzo Manicardi
- Created cardinal: 15 June 1936 by Pope Pius XI
- Rank: Cardinal-deacon

Personal details
- Born: Giovanni Mercati; 17 December 1866 Villa Gaida, Reggio Emilia, Kingdom of Italy
- Died: 23 August 1957 (aged 90) Vatican City
- Buried: San Giorgio in Velabro
- Parents: Domenico Mercati; Giuseppina Montipò
- Education: Pontifical Gregorian University
- Motto: Paratus semper doceri

Styles of Giovanni Mercati
- Reference style: His Eminence
- Spoken style: Your Eminence
- Informal style: Cardinal
- See: none

Giovanni Mercati (17 December 1866 – 23 August 1957) was an Italian cardinal of the Roman Catholic Church. He served as archivist of the Vatican Secret Archives and librarian of the Vatican Library from 1936 until his death, and was elevated to the cardinalate in 1936.

== Biography ==
Giovanni Mercati was born in Villa Gaida, Reggio Emilia, to a devout Christian family. He was the second of four brothers, the elder and third brothers were also priests, as was his uncle, Giuseppe Mercati, who served as a pastor in Castellarano. Giovanni's father, a veterinarian, was a close friend of the Redemptorists of Madonna dell'Olmo, Montecchio Emilia, and after the closure of the convent in 1859, a sizable portion of its library was placed in the Mercati home.

Mercati studied at the minor seminary of Marola, Reggio Emilia, from 1876 to 1882, earning his licence ginnasiale. He entered the classical Lyceum Spallanzani in 1883, and later the seminary of Reggio Emilia. He was ordained to the priesthood on 21 September 1889, and then was sent for further studies to Rome where he resided at the Pontifical Lambard Seminary, and studies at the Pontifical Gregorian University, which granted him his doctorate in theology in the summer of 1891. With him in Rome at the same semimary was his brother Angelo (who would later gain fame for editing the official list of popes). During this period in Rome, Giovanni frequented the public sessions of Accademia di Conferenze storico-giuridiche, and was admitted to use of the Vatican Library in February 1890. Have gained his doctorate, Mercati then underwent his obligatory military service in Florence as a medical attendant (soldato di sanità) until 1893.

On 9 November 1893, he was elected a doctor of the Ambrosian Library in Milan (where he became friends with Achille Ratti), and in October 1898, he was called by Pope Leo XIII to work at the Vatican Library. From 1902 to 1906, Mercati was a member of the Historical-Liturgical Commission, and on 31 January 1903 was named a consultor to the Pontifical Commission for Biblical Studies. He was given the honorific title of domestic prelate of his Holiness on 2 August 1904, and on 23 October 1919 appointed prefect of the Vatican Library. In the summer of 1930, for reasons of personal health, he was relieved of administrative duties at the library. On 12 January 1936, Mercati was given the honorific title of protonotary apostolic.

Pope Pius XI created him Cardinal-Deacon of S. Giorgio in Velabro in the consistory of 15 June 1936, in advance of his appointment three days later, on 18 June, as librarian and archivist of the Holy Roman Church. Mercati was one of the cardinal electors who participated in the 1939 papal conclave, which elected Pope Pius XII. During the early years of World War II, the Cardinal, a known opponent of Fascism, was protected and supported by a number of émigré scholars from Germany. From 1951 to 1952, he served as camerlengo of the Sacred College of Cardinals. A prolific writer and great humanist, he understood Aramaic and the intricacies of racing automobiles and rocketry; he was even called the "most learned prelate to be elevated to the sacred purple" in a century. He was also once quoted as saying, "I'm always ready to learn".

Cardinal Mercati died from a heart attack in Vatican City, at the age of 90. He is buried in his cardinal's church of San Giorgio in Velabro in Rome.

== Selected writings ==
His full bibliography counts 428 entries. The complete list of his writings, with full bibliographical and thematic indexes, has been published by Augusto Campana in:

- Mercati, Giovanni (1941). "Bibliografia degli scritti del card. Giovanni Mercati (1890-1941)". In Campana, Augusto; Giannelli, Ciro (eds.). Opere minori. Studi e Testi, 80. Vol. 5: Indice dei nomi e delle cose notevoli • Indice dei manoscritti citati • Bibliografia degli scritti • Notizie biografiche. Città del Vaticano: Biblioteca Apostolica Vaticana.
- Mercati, Giovanni (1984). "Bibliografia degli scritti del card. Giovanni Mercati (1937-1957)". In Ruysschaert, José; Alteri, Giancarlo; Vian, Paolo (eds.). Opere minori. Studi e Testi, 196. Vol. 6: 1937-1957. Città del Vaticano: Biblioteca Apostolica Vaticana. pp. IX–XVIII.

The following is a selection of his writings.

=== Books ===
==== Editions of texts ====
- Ferrini, Contardo; Mercati, Giovanni, eds. (1897). Basilicorum libri LX. Vol. 7: Editionis Basilicorum Heimbachianae supplementum alterum. Reliquia[e] librorum ineditorum ex libro rescripto Ambrosiano. Lipsiae – Mediolani: Johannes Ambrosius Barth – Ulrico Hoepli.
- Ferrini, Contardo; Mercati, Giovanni, eds. (1914). Μ. κριτοῦ τοῦ Πατζῆ Τιπούκειτος sive librorum LX Basilicorum summarium. Studi e Testi, 25. Vol. 1: Libri I–XII graece et latine. Romae: Typis polyglottis Vaticanis.
- Mercati, Giovanni, ed. (1965). Psalteriii Hexapli Relliquiae. Codices ex ecclesiasticis Italiae bybliotheciis delecti phototypice expressi, 8. Vol. 1: «Osservazioni». Commento critico al testo dei frammenti esaplari. Romae: Typis polyglottis Vaticanis. [†]

==== Monographs ====
- Mercati, Giovanni (1902). Antiche reliquie liturgiche ambrosiane e romane, con un excursus sui frammenti dogmatici ariani del Mai. Studi e Testi, 7. Roma: Tipografia Vaticana.
- Mercati, Giovanni (1903). Varia sacra. Studi e Testi, 11. Vol. 1: I. Anonymi Chiliastae in Matthaeum fragmenta. — II. Piccoli supplementi agli scritti dei dottori Cappadoci e di S. Cirillo Alessandrino. Roma: Tipografia Vaticana.
- Mercati, Giovanni (1904). I. Un frammento delle Ipotiposi di Clemente Alessandrino. II. Paralipomena Ambrosiana, con alcuni appunti sulle benedizioni del cereo pasquale. Studi e Testi, 12. Roma: Tipografia Vaticana.
- Mercati, Giovanni (1905). Opuscoli inediti del Beato Card. Giuseppe Tommasi tratti in luce da Giovanni Mercati. Studi e Testi, 15. Roma: Tipografia Vaticana.
- Mercati, Giovanni (May 1911). S. Congregazione dei Riti. Commissione storico-liturgica. Ricognizione del culto ab immemorabili del Ven. Pietro Portuense detto Pietro degli Onesti Peccatore. Roma: Tipografia Poliglotta Vaticana.
- Mercati, Giovanni (1917). Notizie varie di antica letteratura medica e di bibliografia. I. Filippo Xeros Reggino, Giovanni Alessandrino iatrosoflsta e altri nel codice Vaticano degli « Ephodia ». II. Un nuovo capitolo di Sorano e tre nuove ricette superstiziose in Aezio. III. Su Francesco Calvo da Menaggio primo stampatore e Marco Fabio Calvo da Ravenna primo traduttore latino del corpo Ippocratico. Studi e Testi, 31. Roma: Tipografia Poliglotta Vaticana.
- Mercati, Giovanni (1926). Scritti d'Isidoro il Cardinale Ruteno e codici a lui appartenuti che si conservano nella Biblioteca Apostolica Vaticana. Studi e Testi, 46. Roma: Tipografia Poliglotta Vaticana.
- Mercati, Giovanni (1931). Notizie di Procoro e Demetrio Cidone, Manuele Caleca e Teodoro Meliteniota ed altri appunti per la storia della teologia e della letteratura bizantina del secolo XIV. Studi e Testi, 56. Roma: Tipografia Poliglotta Vaticana.
- Mercati, Giovanni (1935). Per la storia dei manoscritti greci di Genova, di varie badie basiliane d'Italia e di Patmo. Studi e Testi, 68. Roma: Tipografia Poliglotta Vaticana.
- Mercati, Giovanni (1938). Codici latini Pico Grimani Pio e di altra biblioteca ignota del secolo XVI esistenti nell'Ottoboniana, e i codici greci Pio di Modena; con una digressione per la storia dei codici di S. Pietro in Vaticano. Studi e Testi, 75. Roma: Tipografia Poliglotta Vaticana.
- Mercati, Giovanni (1939). Ultimi contributi alla storia degli umanisti. Studi e Testi, 90. Vol. 1: Traversariana. Dieci lettere nuove del B. Ambrogio Camaldolese e varie osservazioni sull’epistolario di lui pubblicate per il V centenario della morte. Seguono alcune lettere di Andrea (Fiocchi) da Firenze segretario apostolico. Roma: Tipografia Poliglotta Vaticana.
- Mercati, Giovanni (1939). Ultimi contributi alla storia degli umanisti. Studi e Testi, 91. Vol. 2: Note sopra A. Bonfini, M. A. Sabellico, A. Sabino, Pescennio Francesco Negro, Pietro Summonte e altri. Roma: Tipografia Poliglotta Vaticana.
- Mercati, Giovanni (1941). Nuove note di letteratura biblica e cristiana antica. Studi e Testi, 95. Roma: Tipografia Poliglotta Vaticana.
- Mercati, Giovanni (1948). Osservazioni a proemi del Salterio di Origene Ippolito Eusebio Cirillo Alessandrino e altri, con frammenti inediti. Studi e Testi, 142. Roma: Tipografia Poliglotta Vaticana.
- Mercati, Giovanni (1950). II frammento maffeiano di Nestorio e la catena dei Salmi d'onde fu tratto. Studi e Testi, 154. Roma: Tipografia Poliglotta Vaticana.
- Mercati, Giovanni (1952). Alla ricerca dei nomi degli «altri» traduttori nelle Omilie sui Salmi di S. Giovanni Crisostomo, e variazioni su alcune catene del Salterio. Studi e Testi, 158. Roma: Tipografia Poliglotta Vaticana.
- Mercati, Giovanni (1952). Note per la storia di alcune biblioteche romane nei secoli XVI-XIX. Studi e Testi, 164. Roma: Tipografia Poliglotta Vaticana.

==== Catalogues ====
- Mercati, Giovanni; Franchi de' Cavalieri, Pio (1923). Codices Vaticani Graeci. Vol. 1: Codices 1-329. Romae: Typis polyglottis Vaticanis.

==== Edited facsimiles ====
- Mercati, Giovanni, ed. (1904). Bibliorum SS. graecorum codex Vaticanus 1209 (Cod. B) denuo phototypice expressus iussu et cura praesidum Bybliothceae Vaticanae. Codices e Vaticanis selecti quam simillime expressi..., 4. Vol. 2: Testamentum novum. Mediolani: Apud Ulricum Hoepli.
- Mercati, Giovanni, ed. (1905). Bibliorum SS. graecorum codex Vaticanus 1209 (Cod. B) denuo phototypice expressus iussu et cura praesidum Bybliothceae Vaticanae. Codices e Vaticanis selecti quam simillime expressi..., 4. Vol. 1: Testamentum Vetus, tomus 1 (pagg. 1–394). Mediolani: Apud Ulricum Hoepli.
- Mercati, Giovanni, ed. (1905). Bibliorum SS. graecorum codex Vaticanus 1209 (Cod. B) denuo phototypice expressus iussu et cura praesidum Bybliothceae Vaticanae. Codices e Vaticanis selecti quam simillime expressi..., 4. Vol. 1: Testamentum Vetus, t. I. Mediolani: Apud Ulricum Hoepli.
- Mercati, Giovanni, ed. (1906). Bibliorum SS. graecorum codex Vaticanus 1209 (Cod. B) denuo phototypice expressus iussu et cura praesidum Bybliothceae Vaticanae. Codices e Vaticanis selecti quam simillime expressi..., 4. Vol. 1: Testamentum Vetus, t. II. Mediolani: Apud Ulricum Hoepli.
- Mercati, Giovanni, ed. (1907). Bibliorum SS. graecorum codex Vaticanus 1209 (Cod. B) denuo phototypice expressus iussu et cura praesidum Bybliothceae Vaticanae. Codices e Vaticanis selecti quam simillime expressi..., 4. Vol. 1: Testamentum Vetus, t. III. Mediolani: Apud Ulricum Hoepli.
- Ehrle, Francesco; Mercati, Giovanni, eds. (1934). M. Tulli Ciceronis de re publica libri. Prolegomena de fatis bibliothecae monasterii S. Columbani Bobiensis et de codice ipso Vat. lat. 6757. Codices e Vaticanis selecti quam simillime expressi..., 23:1. [Romae]: Ex Bibliotheca Apostolica Vaticana.
- Ehrle, Francesco; Mercati, Giovanni, eds. (1934). M. Tulli Ciceronis de re publica libri e codice rescripto Vaticano latino 5757 phototypice expressi. Codices e Vaticanis selecti quam simillime expressi..., 23:2. [Romae]: Ex Bibliotheca Apostolica Vaticana.
- Mercati, Giovanni, ed. (1958). Psalteriii Hexapli Relliquiae. Codices ex ecclesiasticis Italiae bybliotheciis delecti phototypice expressi, 8. Vol. 1: Codex rescriptus Bibliothecae Ambrosianae O 39 sup. phototypice expressus et transcriptus. Romae: Typis polyglottis Vaticanis.

=== Articles ===
- Mercati, Giovanni (1895–1896). "D'un palimpsesto Ambrosiano contenente i Salmi esapli e di un'antica versione latina del commentario perduto di Teodoro di Mopsuestia al Salterio. Nota". Atti della R. Accademia delle Scienze di Torino. 31: 655–676.
- Mercati, Giovanni (1897). "Gli aneddoti d'un codice Bolognese". Byzantinische Zeitschrift. 6: 126–143.
- Mercati, Giovanni (1897). "Il palinsesto Ambrosiano dei Basilici". Rendiconti dell'Istituto Lombardo. Classe di Lettere. Serie II, 30: 821–841.
- Mercati, Giovanni (1901). "Nuovi frammenti dei libri 58-59 dei Basilici in un palinsesto Vaticano. Nota". Rendiconti dell'Istituto Lombardo. Classe di Lettere. Serie II, 34: 1003–1007.
- Mercati, Giovanni (1902). "Frammenti Urbinati d' un'antica versione latina del libro II de' Maccabei editi ed illustrati". Revue Biblique. 11: 184–211.
- Mercati, Giovanni (1943). "Di alcune testimonianze antiche sulle cure bibliche di san Luciano". Biblica. 24 (1–2): 1–17.
- Mercati, Giovanni (1945). "Il Niceforo della catena di Daniele Barbaro e il suo commento del Salterio". Biblica. 26 (3): 153–181.

== Honors ==
In 1936, on the occasion of Mercati's 70th birthday, his brothers Silvio Giuseppe and Angelo, with the help of S. G. Mercati's pupil Ciro Giannelli, edited a collection of cards. Mercati's minor works in four volumes, with a fifth of indexes published in 1941; a sixth and final volume was published in 1984.

1. Mercati, Giovanni (1936). Mercati, Angelo; Mercati, Silvio Giuseppe; Giannelli, Ciro (eds.). Opere minori. Studi e Testi, 76. Vol. 1: 1891-1897. Città del Vaticano: Biblioteca Apostolica Vaticana.
2. Mercati, Giovanni (1936). Mercati, Angelo; Mercati, Silvio Giuseppe; Giannelli, Ciro (eds.). Opere minori. Studi e Testi, 77. Vol. 2: 1897-1906. Città del Vaticano: Biblioteca Apostolica Vaticana.
3. Mercati, Giovanni (1936). Mercati, Angelo; Mercati, Silvio Giuseppe; Giannelli, Ciro (eds.). Opere minori. Studi e Testi, 78. Vol. 3: 1907-1916. Città del Vaticano: Biblioteca Apostolica Vaticana.
4. Mercati, Giovanni (1936). Mercati, Angelo; Mercati, Silvio Giuseppe; Giannelli, Ciro (eds.). Opere minori. Studi e Testi, 79. Vol. 4: 1917-1936. Città del Vaticano: Biblioteca Apostolica Vaticana.
5. Mercati, Giovanni (1941). Campana, Augusto; Giannelli, Ciro (eds.). Opere minori. Studi e Testi, 80. Vol. 5: Indice dei nomi e delle cose notevoli • Indice dei manoscritti citati • Bibliografia degli scritti • Notizie biografiche. Città del Vaticano: Biblioteca Apostolica Vaticana.
6. Mercati, Giovanni (1984). Ruysschaert, José; Alteri, Giancarlo; Vian, Paolo (eds.). Opere minori. Studi e Testi, 196. Vol. 6: 1937-1957. Città del Vaticano: Biblioteca Apostolica Vaticana.

Mercati was also honored with a Festschrift in 6 volumes, published in 1946, to celebrate his 80th birthday:

1. Miscellanea Giovanni Mercati. Studi e Testi, 121. Vol. 1: Bibbia • Letteratura cristiana antica. Città del Vaticano: Biblioteca Apostolica Vaticana. 1946.
2. Miscellanea Giovanni Mercati. Studi e Testi, 122. Vol. 2: Letteratura medioevale. Città del Vaticano: Biblioteca Apostolica Vaticana. 1946.
3. Miscellanea Giovanni Mercati. Studi e Testi, 123. Vol. 3: Letteratura e storia bizantina. Città del Vaticano: Biblioteca Apostolica Vaticana. 1946.
4. Miscellanea Giovanni Mercati. Studi e Testi, 124. Vol. 4: Letteratura classica e umanistica. Città del Vaticano: Biblioteca Apostolica Vaticana. 1946.
5. Miscellanea Giovanni Mercati. Studi e Testi, 125. Vol. 5: Storia ecclesiastica • Diritto. Città del Vaticano: Biblioteca Apostolica Vaticana. 1946.
6. Miscellanea Giovanni Mercati. Studi e Testi, 126. Vol. 6: Paleografia • Bibliografi • Varia. Città del Vaticano: Biblioteca Apostolica Vaticana. 1946.

Preceded by Achille Ratti	Prefect of the Vatican Library; 1919–1936	Succeeded by Eugène-Gabriel-Gervais-Laurent Tisserant
Preceded by Franziskus Ehrle, SJ	Archivist of the Vatican Secret Archives; Librarian of the Vatican Library; 1936–1957	Succeeded by Eugène-Gabriel-Gervais-Laurent Tisserant
