= Giovanni Stefano Donghi =

Italian Catholic cardinal

His Eminence Giovanni Stefano Donghi
- Bishop of Ferrara
- Church: Roman Catholic Church
- Diocese: Ferrara
- See: Ferrara
- Appointed: 26 February 1663
- Term ended: 26 November 1669
- Predecessor: Carlo Pio di Savoia
- Successor: Carlo Cerri
- Other posts: Cardinal-Deacon of Sant'Agata alla Suburra (1655-69); Cardinal Protodeacon (1667-69)
- Previous posts: Cardinal-Deacon of San Giorgio in Velabro (1643-55); Bishop of Vigevano (1649-54); Bishop of Ajaccio (1651-55); Bishop of Imola (1655-63)

Orders
- Consecration: 12 May 1652 by Luca Torreggiani
- Created cardinal: 13 July 1643 by Pope Urban VIII
- Rank: Cardinal-Deacon

Personal details
- Born: Giovanni Stefano Donghi; 1608 Genoa
- Died: 26 November 1669 (aged 61) Rome, Papal States
- Buried: Santissimo Nome di Gesù, Rome, Italy
- Parents: Bartolomeo Donghi; Giacoma Bernardi
- Education: University of Bologna; University of Salamanca

Giovanni Stefano Donghi (1608 – 26 November 1669) was an Italian Catholic cardinal.

== Early life ==
Donghi was born in Genoa in 1608, the son of Bartolomeo Donghi and Giacoma Bernardi. After completing his undergraduate work in the Humanities and Philosophy, he began his university studies at the University of Bologna and completed them with a degree from the University of Salamanca.

== Ecclesiastic career ==
Throughout the 1630s, Donghi was employed in a number of administrative positions in Rome including referendary of the Tribunals of the Apostolic Signature of Justice and of Grace.

On 15 June 1635, he was appointed Protonotary Apostolic de numero participantium and Cleric of the Apostolic Camera (Treasury). He rose to the post of President of the Apostolic Chamber.

In 1643, he acted as commissary-resident for the three legations held by Cardinal Antonio Barberini over regions in which he did not reside - effectively operating as the cardinal's representative in those regions when the cardinal was not there. He was also sent by the pope as legate to Lombardy during the First War of Castro, to reach a peace agreement with the Dukes of Parma after the pope renounced the peace agreement negotiated by Cardinal Bernardino Spada. He was then named Protonotary Apostolic at the Datary.

=== Cardinal ===
Donghi was created a cardinal-deacon by Pope Urban VIII in the consistory of 13 July 1643, and assigned the Deaconry of San Giorgio in Velabro on 31 August 1644. Urban died a year later, on 29 July 1644, and Donghi was one of the fifty-seven cardinals who participated in the papal conclave of 1644. The Conclave opened on 9 August, and resulted in the election of Pope Innocent X on 15 September 1644. Donghi was openly a part of the Spanish faction of the College of Cardinals.

Thereafter he was named plenipotentiary of Pope Innocent during the Second War of Castro, returned to Lombardy and helped to reach a treaty with the Duchy of Parma. He and Cardinal Alessandro Bichi signed the Peace on 31 March 1644.

On 3 July 1651 Cardinal Donghi was named Legatus in the Romandiola and the Exarchate of Ravenna by Pope Innocent X. An inscription in Ravenna, dated 1654, commemorates Donghi's providing supplies of grain to the city during a famine. He was elected Bishop of Ajaccio, Corsica, on 27 November 1651.

Pope Innocent X died on 7 January 1655. The Conclave to elect his successor opened on 18 January. Donghi was one of sixty-six cardinals who participated in the Conclave of 1655. On 7 April, after much twisting and turning over the candidacies of Cardinals Sacchetti, Carafa and Chigi, the Cardinals elected Fabio Chigi, who chose the throne name Pope Alexander VII.

On 14 May 1655, Cardinal Donghi was transferred from the Deaconry of San Giorgio in Velabro to the Deaconry of S. Agata.

On 2 August 1655, Donghi was appointed bishop of Imola. In Imola, he conducted a pastoral visitation throughout his diocese, and then, in 1659, held a diocesan synod. He also received Queen Christina of Sweden as she was on her way to Rome.

On 26 February 1663, Cardinal Donghi was released from his commitment to Imola, and appointed bishop of Ferrara; he held the diocese until his death.

Pope Alexander died on 22 May 1667. The Conclave to elect his successor began on 2 June. Ultimately sixty-four of the sixty-eight cardinals participated, including Giovanni Stefano Donghi. The likely candidates seemed to be Cardinal Girolamo Farnese (the French supported him, and the Cardinal nephew Chigi was favorable), Scipione d'Elci (the preference of the Grand Duke of Tuscany, to whom Chigi was also favorable), and Giulio Rospigliosi. On 20 June, the Conclave elected Giulio Rospigliosi, who became Pope Clement IX.

On 12 March 1668, Cardinal Rinaldo d'Este accepted promotion to the rank of Cardinal Priest of S. Pudenziana, which automatically made Cardinal Donghi the senior Cardinal-Deacon in the Sacred College (Protodeacon).

Cardinal Giovanni Stefano Donghi died on 26 November 1669 and was buried in the Chapel of the Madonna at the Church of the Gesù in Rome. There is no monument or inscription.

== Books ==
- Cardella, Lorenzo (1793). Memorie storiche de cardinali della Santa romana chiesa (in Italian). Vol. Tomo settimo (7). Roma: Pagliarini. pp. 44–46.
- Chiovelli, R. (1994). Cronologia della prima Guerra di Castro nelle carte Barberini. Viterbo.
- Demaria, Giacinto (1898). “La guerra di Castro e la spedizione dei presidi (1639-1649).” In R. Deputazione sovra gli studi di storia patria: Miscellanea di storia italiana, Vol. 4, ser. 3 : 191–256.
- Gauchat, Patritius (Patrice) (1935). Hierarchia catholica IV (1592-1667). Münster: Libraria Regensbergiana.
- Leti, Gregorio (1670). Il Cardinalismo di Santa Chiesa; or, the history of the Cardinals of the Roman Church. pp. 152–153.
- Monson, Craig A. (2016). Habitual Offenders: A True Tale of Nuns, Prostitutes, and Murderers in Seventeenth-Century Italy. University of Chicago Press. p. 32. ISBN 978-0-226-33547-6.
