= Giacomo Serra (cardinal) =

Italian Catholic cardinal (1570–1623)

His Eminence Giacomo Serra
- Cardinal-Priest of Santa Maria della Pace
- Church: Catholic Church

Personal details
- Born: 1570 Genoa, Italy
- Died: 19 Aug 1623 (age 53)

Giacomo Serra (1570–1623) was a Catholic cardinal. He was very active as a papal representative to the Emperor during the Long Turkish War.

== Life ==
He was a son of the noblewoman Claudia Lomellini and her husband Antonio Maria Serra, deputy to Genoa's Nobile Vecchio Portico and a senator of Florence. When his father died in 1579, Giacomo began studying law.

He moved to Rome, where in January 1601 he was made a clerk to the Apostolic Camera. In May of that year he was appointed general commissioner of the army that Pope Clement VIII sent to Hungary against the Turks. Serra had to organize the embarkation of the 9,000 pontifical troops in Ancona and their subsequent journey from the disembarkation point to Zagreb. In October, the papal mercenaries took part in the unsuccessful Siege of Nagykanizsa. Serra sent regular reports to Rome on the operations. He and the surviving companies arrived in Ravenna in early February.

In the summer of 1602, Serra was sent to Vienna with a contribution toward the payment of imperial infantry and cavalry for an anticipated campaign against Pest, which was seen as a base of operations to take nearby Buda. In early 1604, he was in Prague until the arrival of the new nuncio. He was acting governor of Borgo while that post was vacant in 1605. Pope Paul V made him pontifical general commissioner for aid against the Turks in the Long Turkish War for which he recruited a regiment of German soldiers.

In August 1606 he was appointed commissioner and prefect of Annona in Umbria and the Ancona area; in March 1607, he carried out a series of inspections in the Marche and Romagna. In December 1608, he became treasurer general to the Apostolic Camera.

On 17 August 1611 Pope Paul V made him a cardinal, granting him the 'diaconi' of San Giorgio in Velabro on 12 September that year. In 1610-1611 Serra commissioned extensive restorations and invited Discalced Augustinians from his hometown of Genoa to take over management of the church. He then became papal legate to Ferrara in 16 September 1615, holding that post until his death. He issued regulations for the maintenance of public order, promoted economic activities, launched substantial public works both in the city and in the territory. He was Cardinal-protector of the Canons Regular of the Lateran.

In the meantime he became a cardinal priest on 28 September 1615 with the titulus of Santa Maria della Pace. He took part in the papal conclaves of 1621 and 1623. Serra died on 19 August 1623 and was buried at Santa Maria della Pace.

== Art patron ==
In 1606-1608 he commissioned an altarpiece for Santa Maria in Vallicella from Rubens. He became a frequent patron of the painter Guercino and commissioned the St. Sebastian curated by Irene (National Art Gallery of Bologna), the Samson captured by the Philistines (Metropolitan museum of art in New York) and the Return of the prodigal son (Vienna, Kunsthistorisches Museum).

Catholic Church titles
Preceded by Orazio Maffei	Cardinal-Deacon of San Giorgio in Velabro; 1611–1615	Succeeded by Pietro Maria Borghese
Preceded by Flaminio Piatti	Cardinal-Priest of Santa Maria della Pace; 1615–1623	Succeeded by Alessandro d'Este
