= Dubois (surname) =

Dubois (/dʊˈbwɑː/ duu-BWAH; also spelled DuBois or Du Bois, from the French of the woods/forest) is a French surname. Notable people with the surname include:

== Clergy ==
- Florent du Bois de La Villerabel (1877–1951), French archbishop
- Guillaume Dubois (1656–1723), French cardinal and statesman
- Jean-Antoine Dubois (1765–1848), French Catholic missionary in India
- John Dubois (1764–1842), also Jean, French Catholic missionary in Virginia and Appalachians, bishop of New York
- Louis-Ernest Dubois (1856–1929), Roman Catholic cardinal and Archbishop of Paris

== Composers ==
- Alexandra du Bois (born 1981), American composer
- Charles-Victor Dubois (1832–1869), Belgian composer and harmonium player
- Pierre-Max Dubois (1930–1995), classical composer
- R. Luke DuBois, American composer and visual artist
- Théodore Dubois (1837–1924), French organist, composer, and musical administrator

== Military people ==
- Adolphe DuBois d'Aische (1874–1958), Belgian World War I flying ace
- Jean Dubois de Gennes (1895–1929), French World War I flying ace
- Lewis DuBois, American Revolutionary War commander
- Paul-Alexis Dubois (1754–1796), French general of the French Revolutionary Wars
- Pierre Joseph Dubois (1852–1924), French World War I general
- Raymond F. DuBois (born 1947), American defense consultant
- Toussaint Dubois (1762–1816), French-American soldier

== Painters and sculptors ==
- Albert Dubois-Pillet (1846–1890), French Neo-impressionist painter and career army officer
- Ambroise Dubois (1542/43–1614/15), Flemish-born French painter
- Émile Fernand-Dubois (1869–1952), Belgian-French sculptor and medalist
- Ernest Henri Dubois (1863–1930), French sculptor
- François Dubois (19th century) (1790–1871), neoclassical French painter
- François Dubois (1529–1584), Huguenot French painter
- Frederic Dubois (c. 1760 – c. 1822), French miniature painter and painter
- Georges Dubois (sculptor) (1865–1934), French sculptor
- Gérard DuBois (born 1968), French illustrator
- Guillam Dubois (1623–1661), Dutch Golden Age landscape painter
- Guy Pène du Bois (1884–1958), American painter, art critic, and educator
- Jean Dubois the Elder (1604–1679), French landscape painter
- Jess E. DuBois (1934–2022), American painter
- Louis Dubois (painter) (1830–1880), Belgian painter
- Paul Dubois (sculptor) (1829–1905), French sculptor and painter
- Paul Élie Dubois (1886–1949), French Orientalist painter
- Pierre-Gilles Dubois (1938–1995), Canadian sculptor and painter

== Performers ==
- Arthur Dubois (c. 1946–2022), American hip-hop artist and music producer
- Candy Dubois (1934–1995), Chilean dancer
- Charles-Hippolyte Dubois-Davesnes (1800–1874), French playwright, actor, theatre director and manager
- Claude Dubois (born 1947), Canadian singer-songwriter
- Cyrille Dubois (born 1984), French opera and lieder singer
- Dallas DuBois (born 1986), American actor and drag queen
- Emmanuel Dubois (born 1984), Canadian rapper
- Irene Dubois (born 1993), American drag performer
- Ja'Net DuBois (1932–2020), American actress and singer
- Jean-Baptiste Dubois (actor) (1762–c. 1817), French actor, comedian, dancer and singer
- Jean-Baptiste Dubois (cellist) (1870–1938), Belgian-born Canadian cellist
- Jean-Pol Dubois (died 2025), French actor
- Jerome Xavier DuBois, Canadian-born Taiwanese singer and songwriter
- Marie Dubois (1937–2014), French actress
- Marta DuBois (1952–2018), Panamanian-American actress
- Michel Dubois (theatre) (1937–2021), French theatre director and actor
- Micke Dubois (1959–2005), Swedish actor and comedian
- Nikola Dubois (born 1977), Australian actress
- Olivier Dubois (born 1972), French choreographer
- Samantha Dubois (1955–1992), Dutch-born radio presenter
- Victoire Du Bois (born 1988/1989), French actress
- Vincent Dubois (organist) (born 1980), French organist

== Politicians ==
- Benjamin F. DuBois (1915–2013), American politician
- Claude Dubois (politician) (born 1931), Canadian politician
- Daniel Dubois (politician) (born 1952), French politician
- Edmond Louis Alexis Dubois-Crancé (1747–1814), French Revolutionary
- Émile Dubois (1913–1973), French politician
- Émile-Jules Dubois (1853–1904), French doctor and politician
- Florent Dubois (1906–1987), Canadian politician
- Francis Dubois (born 1961), French politician
- Françoise Dubois (born 1947), French politician
- Fred Dubois (1851–1930), American politician
- Jacqueline Dubois (born 1957), French politician
- Jean-Guy Dubois (born 1948), Canadian politician, lawyer and academic
- Jean-Michel Dubois (born 1943), French politician
- Jean-Pierre Dubois (born 1952), French leftist activist and lawyer
- Jesse K. Dubois (1811–1876), American politician
- Louis Dubois (politician) (1859–1946), French politician
- Louis Victor Dubois (1837–1914), French politician
- Lucien Dubois (1893–1948), Canadian politician and farmer
- Marianne Dubois (born 1957), French politician
- Mark Dubois (born 1949), American environmental activist
- Michelle DuBois, American politician
- Stephen Dubois (born 1940), Australian politician
- Vincent Dubois (politician) (born 1981), French Polynesian politician and lawyer
- William H. Dubois (1835–1907), American businessman and political figure

== Scientists ==
- Alphonse Dubois (1839–1921), Belgian naturalist
- Anna Dubois (born 1962), Swedish organizational theorist
- Charles Frédéric Dubois (1804–1867), Belgian naturalist
- Cora Du Bois (1903–1991), American cultural anthropologist
- Didier Dubois (mathematician) (born 1952), French mathematician
- Ellen DuBois (born 1947), American feminist historian
- Eugène Dubois (1858–1940), Dutch anthropologist
- Frédéric Dubois d'Amiens (1799–1873), French physician and historian of medicine
- Jacques Dubois (literary theorist) (1933–2026), Belgian literary theorist and critic
- Jacques Dubois (1478–1555), French anatomist
- Jacques-Émile Dubois (1920–2005), French chemist
- Jean Dubois (linguist) (1920–2015), French linguist
- Laurent Dubois, American historian
- Marcel Dubois (1856–1916), French geographer
- Marcel-Jacques Dubois (1920–2007), French theologian
- Page DuBois, American classicist
- Paul Antoine Dubois (1795–1871), French obstetrician
- Paul Charles Dubois (1848–1918), Swiss neuropathologist
- Raphaël Dubois (1849–1929), French pharmacologist
- W. E. B. Du Bois (1868–1963), American sociologist, historian, civil rights activist and author

== Sportspeople ==
- Adrian Dubois (born 1987), American soccer player
- Albane Dubois (born 1992), French sailor
- Alice Dubois (born 1970), French judoka
- Arnaud Dubois (born 1986), Belgian racing cyclist
- Brian DuBois (born 1967), American baseball player
- Caroline Dubois (boxer) (born 2001), British boxer
- Catherine Dubois (born 1995), Canadian ice hockey player
- Daniel Dubois (boxer) (born 1997), British boxer
- Didier Dubois (athlete) (born 1957), French sprinter
- Édouard Dubois (born 1989), French golfer
- Gabriel Dubois (1911–1985), French racing cyclist
- Georges Dubois (gymnast), French gymnast
- Georges Dubois (skier) (born 1935), Swiss skier
- Guy Dubois (born 1950), Swiss ice hockey player
- Iván Dubois (born 1995), Argentine footballer
- Jason Dubois (born 1979), American baseball player
- Jean Dubois (canoeist) (1914–?), Belgian sprint canoeist
- Jean Dubois (field hockey) (1926–2021), Belgian field hockey player
- Joe Dubois (1927–1987), Northern Irish footballer
- Léo Dubois (born 1994), French footballer
- Marco Dubois (born 1995), Canadian football player
- Marie-Françoise Dubois (born 1948), French athlete
- Michel Dubois (ice hockey) (born 1954), Canadian ice hockey player
- Pascal Dubois (born 1962), French road cyclist
- Pierre-Luc Dubois (born 1998), Canadian ice hockey player
- Raúl Dubois (born 1959), Cuban basketball player
- René Dubois (1906–?), French boxer
- Serafino Dubois (1817–1899), Italian chess master and writer
- Serge Dubois (born 1954), Belgian field hockey player
- Stéphanie Dubois (born 1986), Canadian tennis player
- Theo Dubois (1911–2011), Belgian-Canadian rower
- Thierry Dubois (born 1967), French sailor

== Writers ==
- Brendan DuBois (born 1959), American mystery writer
- Caroline Dubois (poet) (born 1960), French poet
- Constance Goddard DuBois (died 1934), American novelist and an ethnographer
- Edward Dubois (1774–1850), English wit and man of letters
- Guillaume Crétin (or Dubois) (c. 1460–1525), French poet
- Jean-Paul Dubois (born 1950), French journalist and author
- Joseph-Gaspard Dubois-Fontanelle (1727–1812), French journalist, man of letters, playwright and translator
- Jules Dubois (1910–1966), American journalist
- Philippe Goibaut (known also as Monsieur Du Bois) (1629–1694), French writer and translator
- Pierre Dubois (author) (born 1945), French author, comics scriptwriter, storyteller and lecturer
- Pierre Dubois (scholastic) (c. 1255 – after 1321), French scholastic and writer
- Pierre H. Dubois (1917–1999), Dutch writer and critic
- Pye Dubois, Canadian lyricist and poet
- René-Daniel Dubois (born 1955), Québécois playwright and actor
- Shirley Graham Du Bois (1896–1977), American author, playwright, composer, and activist
- Sieur Dubois, pseudonymous author of 1674 travel book
- Tim DuBois (born 1948), American country songwriter
- W.E.B. Du Bois (1868–1963), American sociologist, socialist, historian, and Pan-Africanist civil rights activist, husband of Nina Gomer and father of Yolande
- William Pène du Bois (1916–1993), author and illustrator

== Others ==
- Allison DuBois (born 1972), research spiritual medium and inspiration for the TV show Medium
- Antoine Dubois (1756–1837), French surgeon
- Ed Dubois (1952–2016), British yacht designer
- Émile Dubois (murderer) (1867–1907), French-born Chilean criminal, serial killer and folk hero
- Félix Dubois (1862–1945), French journalist, explorer and speculator
- Gérard Dubois (chef), Swiss-born chef
- Jan E. DuBois (1931–2026), American judge
- Joshua DuBois (born 1982), head of the Office of Faith Based and Neighborhood Partnerships under President Obama
- Josué Dubois Berthelot de Beaucours (c. 1662–1750), French-Canadian military officer, chief engineer and governor
- Léon-Jean-Joseph Dubois (1780–1846), French illustrator, lithographer, archaeologist and curator at the Louvre museum
- Louis DuBois (Huguenot) (died 1696), Huguenot colonist in New Netherland
- Macy DuBois (1929–2007), Canadian architect
- Mary Silvina Burghardt Du Bois (1831–1885), American domestic worker, mother of W.E.B
- Maurice DuBois (born 1965), American journalist
- Nina Gomer Du Bois (1870–1950), American civil rights activist, wife of W.E.B
- Paul Dubois (diplomat) (born 1943), Canadian diplomat
- Stanisław Dubois (1901–1942), Polish journalist and political activist
- Sylvia Dubois (c. 1788/89–1888), African-American woman born into slavery who became free after striking her slave mistress
- Urbain Dubois (1818–1901), French chef
- William Dubois (architect) (1879–1953), American architect
- Yolande Du Bois (1900–1961), American teacher associated with the Harlem Renaissance, daughter of W.E.B. and Nina Gomer

== Fictional characters ==
- Artemis Dubois, a character in the FXX Series It's Always Sunny in Philadelphia
- Blanche DuBois, one of the female leads in A Streetcar Named Desire
- Capitane Chantel DuBois, the main antagonist of Madagascar 3: Europe's Most Wanted
- Didier Dubois, a fictitious character in Driv3r
- Fabrice Dubois, a fictitious identity of Nemesis in Nemesis: Reloaded
- Harrier "Harry" Du Bois, the main character of Disco Elysium
- Helen Dubois, a character in Drake and Josh
- Hubie Dubois, a character from the Adam Sandler movie Hubie Halloween
- Shriek DuBois, a character in the Nickelodeon animated series CatDog
- Skeeter Dubois, the main character and host from the Mondo Media adult web animated series Like, News (1999-2001)
- The Dubois Family, friends of the main characters in The Boondocks
- Laurel Dubois, the late biological mother of protagonist Randal Person in This Is Us

== See also ==
- Dubos, a French surname
- DuBose (disambiguation)
