= List of senators of Nord =

Location of Nord in France

Following is a list of senators of Nord, people who have represented the department of Nord in the Senate of France.

== Third Republic ==
Senators for Nord under the French Third Republic were:

- Jules Maurice (1876)
- Louis de Hau de Staplande (1876–1877)
- Jules Brame (1876–1878)
- Octave-Joseph d'Hespel (1876–1879)
- Maximilien Mailliet (1876–1879)
- Jules Dutilleul (1879–1883)
- Casimir Fournier (1879–1887)
- Émile Massiet du Biest (1879–1888)
- Louis Faidherbe (1879–1888)
- Charles Merlin (1879–1895)
- Édouard Fiévet (1885–1888)
- Alfred Girard (1887–1910)
- Victor Cirier (1888–1890)
- Achille Scrépel (1888–1897)
- Géry Legrand (1888–1902)
- Léon Claeys (1888–1906)
- Maxime Lecomte (1891–1914)
- Jean-Baptiste Trystram (1892–1905)
- Théophile Depreux (1895–1906)
- Émile Dubois (1897–1905)
- Auguste Potié (1903–1939)
- Félix Chatteleyn (1904–1906)
- Jean-Baptiste Trystram (1905–1924)
- Paul Hayez (1905–1935)
- Évrard Éliez-Évrard (1906–1908)
- Henri Lozé (1906–1915)
- Paul Bersez (1906–1940)
- Henri Sculfort (1908–1914)
- Charles Debierre (1911–1932)
- Joseph Dehove (1914–1924)
- Gustave Dron (1914–1930)
- Jean Plichon (1920–1924)
- Léon Pasqual (1924–1927)
- Émile Davaine (1924–1933)
- Albert Mahieu (1924–1940)
- Daniel Vincent (1927–1940)
- Amaury de La Grange (1930–1940)
- Édouard Roussel (1932–1940)
- Louis Demesmay (1933–1940)
- Guillaume des Rotours (1935–1940)

== Fourth Republic ==
Senators for Nord under the French Fourth Republic were:

- Ernest Couteaux (1946–1947)
- Henri Liénard (1946–1948)
- Isabelle Claeys (1946–1949)
- Henri Martel (1946–1951)
- Pierre Delfortrie (1946–1952)
- Albert Denvers (1946–1956)
- Maurice Walker (1946–1959)
- Armand Coquart (1948)
- Pierre Delcourt (1948)
- Arthur Marchant (1948–1951)
- André Canivez (1948–1958)
- Jules Houcke (1948–1958)
- Charles Naveau (1948–1959)
- Adolphe Dutoit (1949–1959)
- Marcel Ulrici (1951–1952) and (1956–1959)
- Jean Vandaele (1951–1958)
- Arthur Ramette (1952–1956)
- Robert Liot (1952–1959)
- Marcel Bertrand (1956–1959)
- Octave Bajeux (1958–1959)
- Alfred Dehé (1958–1959)
- Émile Dubois (1958–1959)

== Fifth Republic ==
Senators for Nord under the French Fifth Republic were:

- Maurice Walker (1959)
- Marcel Bertrand (1959–1961)
- Eugène Motte (1959–1965)
- Jules Emaille (1959–1965)
- Charles Naveau (1959–1967)
- Adolphe Dutoit (1959–1967)
- Alfred Dehé (1959–1969)
- Émile Dubois (1959–1973)
- Robert Liot (1959–1974)
- Octave Bajeux (1959–1983)
- Marcel Darou (1961–1974)
- Pierre Carous (1965–1990)
- André Diligent (1965–1974) and (1983–2001)
- Marcel Guislain (1967–1974)
- Hector Viron (1967–1992)
- Roger Deblock (1969–1974)
- René Debesson (1973–1979)
- Victor Provo (1974–1977)
- Jean Desmarets (1974–1983)
- Jean Varlet (1974–1983)
- Claude Prouvoyeur (1983–1992)
- Gérard Ehlers (1974–1985)
- Maurice Schumann (1974–1998)
- Roland Grimaldi (1977–1992)
- Jacques Bialski (1979–1997)
- Jean-Paul Bataille (1983–1992) and (1998–1999)
- Arthur Moulin (1983–1992)
- Guy Allouche (1983–2001)
- Ivan Renar (1985–2011)
- Marie-Fanny Gournay (1990–1992)
- Alfred Foy (1992–2001)
- Pierre Mauroy (1992–2011)
- Paul Raoult (1992–2011)
- Pierre Lefebvre (1997–2001)
- Dinah Derycke (1997–2002)
- Jacques Donnay (1999–2001)
- Sylvie Desmarescaux (2001–2011)
- Jean-René Lecerf (2001–2015)
- Bernard Frimat (2002–2011)
- Michel Delebarre (2011–2017)
- Marie-Christine Blandin (2001–2017)
- Anne-Lise Dufour-Tonini (2017)
- Dominique Bailly (2011–2017
- Michelle Demessine (1992–1997) and (2001–2017)
- Delphine Bataille (2011–2017)
- Jacques Legendre (1992–2017)
- Patrick Masclet (2015–2017)
- Béatrice Descamps (2007–2010) and (2017)
- Alain Poyart (2017)
- Alex Türk (1992–2017)
- René Vandierendonck (2011–2017)

As of January 2018 the senators were:

Name	Took office	Group	Notes
Éric Bocquet	2011	French Communist Party (PCF)	
Marc-Philippe Daubresse	2017	The Republicans (LR)	
Patrick Kanner	2017	Socialist Party (PS)	
Valérie Létard	2001–2007, from 2010	Union of Democrats and Independents (UDI)	Member of the government from 2007 to 2010
Jean-Pierre Decool	2017	Miscellaneous right (DVD)	
Martine Filleul	2017	Socialist Party (PS)	
Frédéric Marchand	2017	La République En Marche! (REM)]	
Dany Wattebled	2017	Miscellaneous right (DVD)	
Michelle Gréaume	2017	French Communist Party (PCF)	
Brigitte Lherbier	2017	The Republicans (LR)	
Olivier Henno	2017	Union of Democrats and Independents (UDI)	

== Sources ==
- Liste des anciens sénateurs de la IIIème République par circonscription (in French), Sénat de France
- Liste des anciens sénateurs de la IVème République par circonscription (in French), Sénat de France
- Liste des anciens sénateurs de la Vème République par circonscription (in French), Sénat de France
- Liste par département - Nord (in French), Sénat de France
