= Émile Dubois =

Émile Dubois may refer to:

- Émile Dubois (murderer) (1867–1907), French-born serial killer in Chile
- Émile Dubois (politician) (1913–1973), French politician
- Émile-Jules Dubois (1853–1904), French doctor and politician
- Jacques-Émile Dubois (1920–2005), French chemist
- Émile Fernand-Dubois (1869–1952), Belgian sculptor and medallist
