= List of people from Grenoble =

The following is a list of notable people born in or associated with the French city of Grenoble, Isère.

== Grenoblois natives ==
The city was the birthplace of the following people.

- Abel Servien, marquis de Sablé et de Boisdauphin (1593–1659) a French diplomat.
- Antoine Marini (15th century), theologian, political thinker and diplomat, adviser to King George Podiebrad of Bohemia
- Hugues de Lionne (1611–1671) a French statesman.
- Claudine Françoise Mignot (1624–1711) a French adventuress. commonly called "Marie".
- Pierre Guérin de Tencin (1679–1758), French ecclesiastic, archbishop of Embrun and Lyon and a cardinal.
- Claudine Guérin de Tencin (1682–1749) a French salonist and author.
- François-Emmanuel Guignard, comte de Saint-Priest (1735–1821), a politician and diplomat.
- Francis Regis Clet (1748–1820), martyr saint of China
- Jacques de Vaucanson (1709–1782), inventor of the automated loom and an automaton known as the Digesting Duck
- Jacques Rochette de La Morlière (1719–1785), 18th-century French playwright and writer.
- Étienne Bonnot de Condillac (1715–1780), writer of the Enlightenment.
- Joseph-Gaspard Dubois-Fontanelle (1727–1812), journalist and playwright
- Claude Périer (1742–1801), public figure of the French Revolution and French Directory, banker
- Pierre Joseph Joubert de La Salette (1743–1833), General, musicologist
- Georges Toscan (1756–1826), librarian and naturalist
- Jean Joseph Mounier (1758–1806), politician.
- Antoine Barnave (1761–1793), orator of the French Revolution.
- Camille Teisseire (1764–1842), industrialist and public figure of the French Revolution
- Rose Philippine Duchesne (1769–1852), religious sister, educator and saint of the Catholic Church
- Casimir Pierre Périer (1777–1832), statesman.
- Stendhal (1783–1842), real name Marie-Henri Beyle, author.
- Antoine Clot (1793–1868) a French doctor known as Clot Bey while practicing in Egypt.
- Léon Roches (1809–1901), diplomat
- Henri Fantin-Latour (1836–1904), painter.
- Charles Bertier (1860–1924), landscape painter
- Philibert Guinier (1876–1962), botanist
- Pierre Cot (1895–1977), anti-fascist politician
- Lionel Terray (1921–1965), climber
- Michel Calonne (1927–2019), writer
- Ultra Violet (1935–2014), artist, author and former colleague of the American artist Andy Warhol
- Johnny Servoz-Gavin (1942–2006), motor-racing driver
- Michel Lotito (1950–2007), entertainer
- Maurice Dantec (1959–2016), science-fiction author
- Sami Bouajila (born 1966), actor
- Christophe Aribert (born 1971), chef; holds two Michelin stars and four toques Gault Millau
- Seyhan Kurt (born 1971), poet and writer
- Fabrice Bellard (born 1972), computer programmer and author of FFmpeg
- Miss Kittin (real name Caroline Hervé; born 1973), electronica-music singer
- Vincent Clerc (born 1981), professional rugby union player (wing position)
- Pierre-Jean Croset (born 1949), composer and musicologist
- Olivier Giroud (born 1986), former Grenoble Foot 38 footballer, who now plays for Italian Serie A side Milan
- Mister V (born 1993), YouTuber, Internet personality, comedian, rapper, and actor
- Camille Étienne (born 1998), environmental activist
- Oumy Diop (born 2003), French-Senegalese swimmer

== Grenoblois residents ==
The following people have resided in Grenoble.

(sorted by year of birth)

- Pierre Terrail, seigneur de Bayard (1473–1524) a French knight and military leader.
- François de Bonne, duc de Lesdiguières (1543–1626) – lieutenant-general of Dauphiné.
- Jean-Jacques Rousseau (1712–1778) – philosopher and writer.
- Jean-François Champollion (1790–1832) – Egyptologist.
- Joseph Fourier (1768–1830) – mathematician and physicist.
- Benjamin de Rolland (1773–1855) – French portraitist, court painter and director of the Museum of Grenoble
- Louis Néel (1904–2000) – physicist
- Pierre Mendès France (1907–1982) – French prime minister
- Jean-Luc Godard (1930–2022) – film director
- Youri Djorkaeff (born 1968) – association footballer; member of winning Team France at the 1998 FIFA World Cup and at the UEFA Euro 2000
- Cristobal Huet (born 1975) – professional ice hockey goaltender (Chicago Blackhawks)
- Katsuni (born 1979) – professional pornographic actress; studied at the Grenoble Institute of Political Studies
- Julien Brellier (born 1982) – association footballer; former team member of Heart of Midlothian F.C.

== See also ==
- List of French people
