= Charles Dubois =

Charles Dubois is the name of:

- Charles Dubois (treasurer) (died 1740), East India Company treasurer and botanist
- Charles Elwyn Du Bois (1903–1996), American architect known for mid-century modern design
- Charles Frédéric Dubois (1804–1867), Belgian naturalist
- Charles-Victor Dubois (1832–1869), Belgian composer and harmonium player
- Charles du Bois de Vroylande (1835–1888), Belgian lawyer and politician
- Charles Du Bos (1882–1939), French critic
- Paul Charles Dubois (1848–1918), Swiss neuropathologist
