= Gérard Dubois =

Gérard Dubois may refer to:

- Gérard Dubois (chef) (fl. from 1991), Swiss-born chef and businessman
- Gérard DuBois (born 1968), French illustrator
