= Derycke =

Derycke is a surname. It may refer to:

- Dinah Derycke (1946–2002), French politician
- Erik Derycke (politician) (born 1949), Belgian judge and politician
- Erik Derycke (quiz player) (born 1970), Belgian quiz player
- Germain Derycke (1929–1978), Belgian road bicycle racer
