= Duboscq =

Duboscq is a French surname. People with the name include:

- Genevieve Duboscq (1933–2018), author
- Hugues Duboscq (born 1981), swimmer
- Jules Duboscq (1817–1886), instrument maker, inventor, and photographer
- Lucien Duboscq (1893–1935), actor
- Octave Duboscq (1868–1943), zoologist, mycologist and parasitologist

== See also ==
- Dubosc
