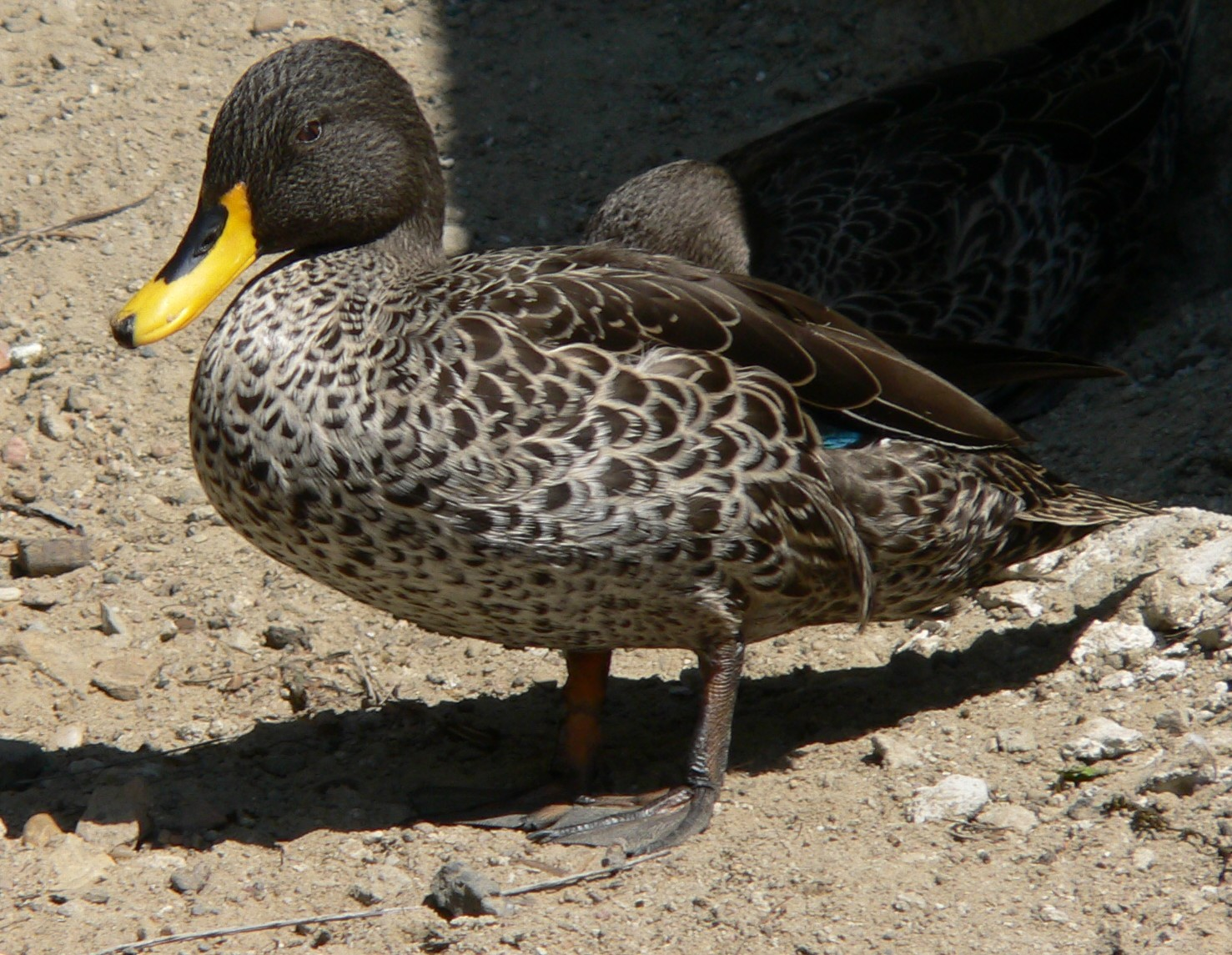

Conservation status
- Least Concern (IUCN 3.1)

Scientific classification
- Kingdom: Animalia
- Phylum: Chordata
- Class: Aves
- Order: Anseriformes
- Family: Anatidae
- Genus: Anas
- Species: A. undulata

Binomial name
- Anas undulata Dubois, 1838

Subspecies
- A. u. rueppelli (Blyth, 1855) northern yellow-billed duck; A. u. undulata (Dubois, 1839) southern yellow-billed duck

= Yellow-billed duck =

Species of bird

The yellow-billed duck (Anas undulata) is a 51–58 cm long dabbling duck which is an abundant resident breeder in southern and eastern Africa. This duck is not migratory, but wanders in the dry season to find suitable waters. It is highly gregarious outside the breeding season and forms large flocks.

== Taxonomy ==
The yellow-billed duck was formally described in 1838 by the Belgian naturalist Charles Frédéric Dubois under the current binomial name Anas undulata based on a speciment collected near the Cape of Good Hope in South Africa. The specific epithet is from Latin undulatus meaning "furnished with wave-like markings".

Two subspecies are recognised:

- A. u. ruppelli Blyth, 1855 – Eritrea, Ethiopia, and eastern South Sudan to northern Uganda (possibly extirpated) and northern Kenya
- A. u. undulata Dubois, 1838 – local from Kenya and Uganda to Angola and South Africa; also local in eastern Nigeria and central Cameroon

== Description ==
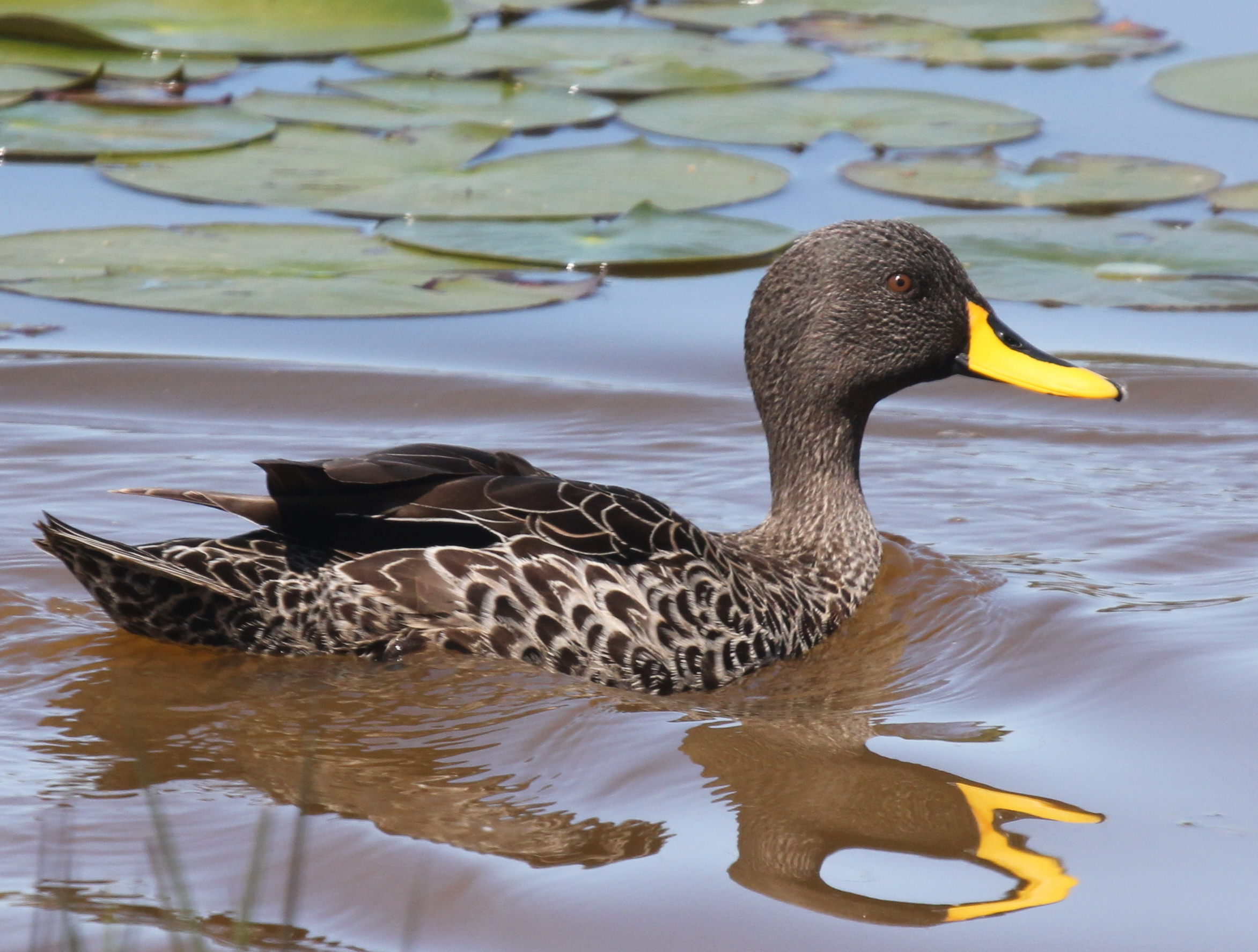
Swimming at Plettenberg Bay, South Africa

These are mallard-sized mainly grey ducks with a darker head and bright yellow bill. The wings are whitish below, and from above show a white-bordered green speculum. Sexes are similar, and juveniles are slightly duller than adults. The north-eastern race is darker and has a brighter bill and blue speculum.

It is a bird of freshwater habitats in fairly open country and feeds by dabbling for plant food mainly in the evening or at night. It nests on the ground in dense vegetation near water. Rarely, it is found in suburban areas, in close proximity to golf courses, parks and lakes or dams. The clutch numbers between six and twelve eggs.

The male has a teal-like whistle, whereas the female has a mallard-like quack.

The yellow-billed duck is one of the species to which the Agreement on the Conservation of African-Eurasian Migratory Waterbirds (AEWA) applies. The southern nominate subspecies is declining due to competition and hybridization with feral mallards (Rhymer 2006).

== Biology ==
=== Life Expectancy ===
Male and female yellow-billed ducks have a statistically significant difference in life spans. Male ducks live for 4 years and 4 months on average while female ducks only live for just over 3 years. As such the difference in survival rate is statistically significant as well. 79% of males survive any given year while only 72% of females do. While the juvenile survival rate is highly variable year to year, on average 67% of juveniles survive. Highest mortality for the yellow-billed duck occurs in the summer months with December typically having the highest death rate out of any month of the year closely followed by January.

=== Courtship ===
The male yellow-billed duck performs multiple displays of courtship, similar to many other African ducks. The number of courtship displays the yellow-billed ducks perform is greater than many other African ducks. Ornithologists have noted seven major displays of courtship similar African ducks perform; most species do not perform all seven, however, the yellow-billed duck will engage in all seven forms of courtship. The lack of sexual dichotomy and generally bland plumage may be the driving factor for the elaborate displays of courtship.

=== Molt ===
Like most other waterfowl, yellow-billed ducks undergo a molting process in which they lose all flight feathers at one time leaving them flightless for three to four weeks. This leaves them especially vulnerable to predators and makes foraging difficult. Yellow-billed ducks lose considerable (about a quarter) body mass during the first half of molting, similar to many waterfowl, but are able to regain all that mass by the end of the molt unlike most other African waterfowl which end the molt lighter than beforehand. This suggests that the mobility of partially molted yellow-billed ducks is greater than other waterfowl, allowing them to effectively gather food even before the new flight feathers are fully developed.

== Threats ==
=== Hunting ===
While yellow-billed ducks are protected by the Conservation of African-Eurasian Migratory Waterbirds Agreement, the species can be hunted as long as lead shot is not used. Hunting seasons for the yellow-billed duck are planned so as not to overlap with the breeding season, which is around July. However, the exact breeding season varies annually based on the climate. Hunting is a major cause of death for the yellow-billed duck with past analysis showing over 25% of duck deaths were due to shooting.

=== Hybridization ===
In the mid-20th century, mallards were introduced to Africa and as the invasive population size has grown, concerns over possible hybridization with the yellow-billed duck have occurred. This fear is fueled by other examples of invasive mallards causing localized extinction of other native ducks around the world because of hybridization.

The fear of possible hybridization between mallards and yellow-billed ducks has been exacerbated by casual observations that suggest possible hybridization of the yellow-billed duck with other native ducks is occurring, however, no genetic tests have been done to shine additional light on these morphological observations to confirm if these individuals are truly hybrids.

Even when genetics have been used, it is still difficult to understand if hybridization is occurring. If hybridization between mallards and yellow-billed ducks is occurring is still debated. Two recent (2019 and 2020) DNA sequencing studies reached opposite conclusions on if hybridization between mallards and yellow-billed ducks is happening. Nevertheless, scientists agree that changes to the gene pool of yellow-billed ducks from possible hybridization, even in the long term, is likely to be negligible. This is because even if mallard and yellow-billed duck hybridization is occurring, introgression is mainly occurring to the mallards' gene pool, keeping the yellow-billed ducks genetics fairly intact.

== Gallery ==
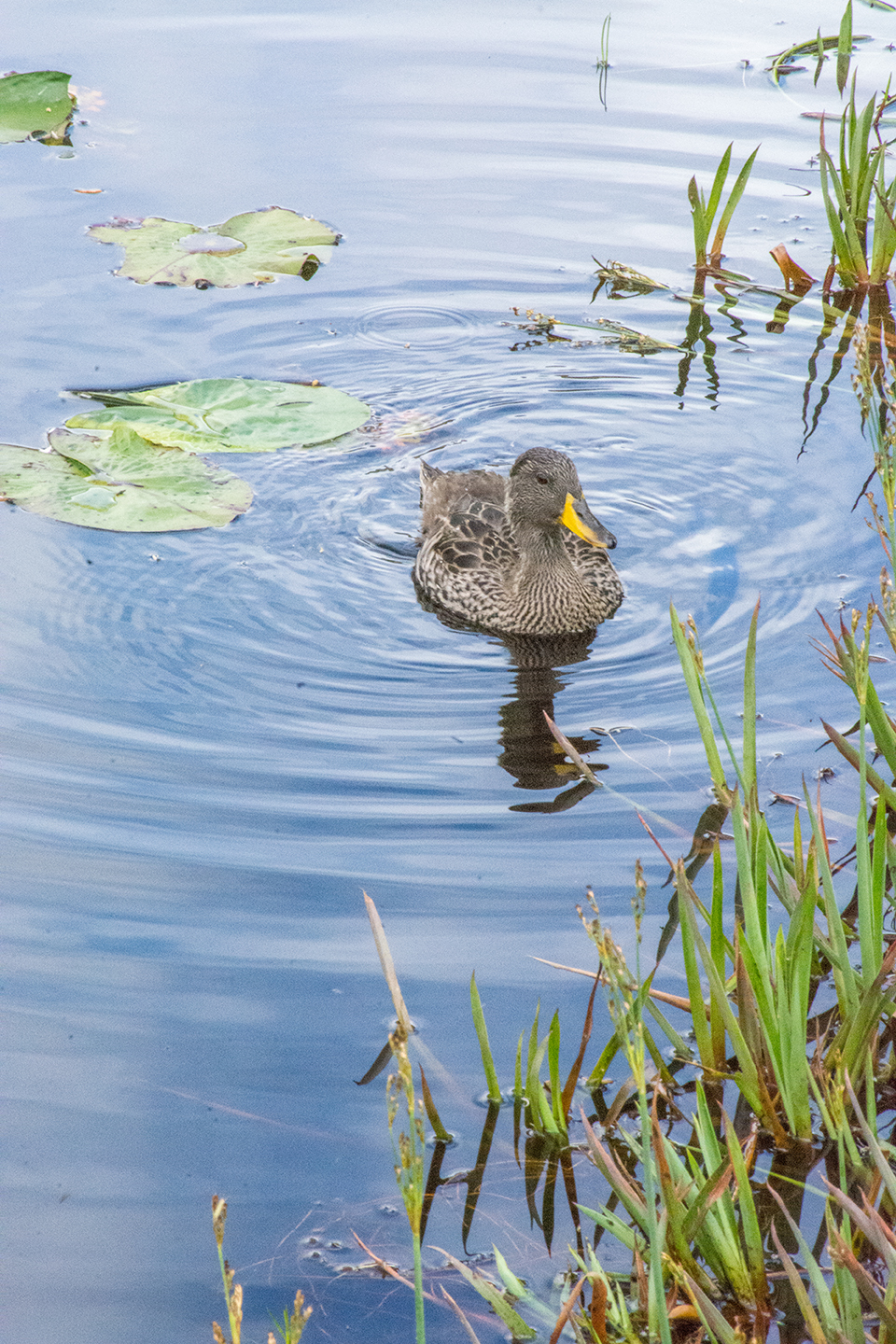
