= Pierre Lefebvre (politician) =

French politician (1938–2026

Member of the French Senate for Nord
- In office 20 June 1997 – 30 September 2001
- Preceded by: Michelle Demessine
- Succeeded by: Michelle Demessine
- Parliamentary group: Communist, Republican, Citizen and Ecologist group

Member of the General Council of Nord for the Canton of Douai-Sud
- In office 17 March 1985 – 28 March 2004
- Preceded by: Alexandre Derveaux
- Succeeded by: Laurent Houllier

Personal details
- Born: 11 September 1938 Escaudain, France
- Died: 17 April 2026 (aged 87) Dechy, France
- Party: PCF
- Occupation: Trade unionist

Pierre Lefebvre (French: [pjˈɛʁ ləfˈɛbvʁ]; 11 September 1938 – 17 April 2026) was a French politician of the French Communist Party (PCF).

== Life and career ==
Born in Escaudain on 11 September 1938, Lefebvre began his career with the SNCF and became active in the General Confederation of Labour, serving as secretary of the confederation's Douai chapter and on its national council. He first entered politics when he was successfully elected to the General Council of Nord in 1985, representing the Canton of Douai-Sud. He was re-elected in 1992 and 1998. In 1992, he unsuccessfully ran for a seat in the Senate on a list led by Ivan Renar. After Michelle Demessine was nominated to serve as Secretary of State for Tourism, he replaced her in the Senate, serving from 20 June 1997 to 30 September 2001.

Lefebvre died in Dechy on 17 April 2026, at the age of 87.
