= Dubos =

Dubos is a French surname. Notable people with the surname include:

- Jean-Baptiste Dubos (1670–1742), French writer
- Jean-François Dubos (born 1945), French businessman
- René Dubos (1901–1982), American scientist

== See also ==
- Charles Du Bos (1882–1939), French essayist and critic
- Marie-Jeanne Renard du Bos (1700 – between 1730 and 1750), French engraver
- Dubois (disambiguation)
- DuBose (disambiguation)
