= Dubois =

Dubois, DuBois, or Du Bois may refer to:

== People ==
- Dubois (surname), a Norman-French surname (includes a list of people with the surnames Dubois and Du Bois)
  - W. E. B. Du Bois, American sociologist and activist

== Places ==
=== United States ===
- Mount Dubois, California
- Dubois, Idaho
- Du Bois, Illinois
- Dubois, Indiana
- Dubois County, Indiana
- Du Bois, Nebraska
- DuBois, Pennsylvania
- Dubois, Wyoming

== Others ==
- Bal du Bois, debutante ball in Richmond, Virginia
- 206241 Dubois, an asteroid

== See also ==
- DuBose (disambiguation) (and thereby Dubose)
