= DuBose =

DuBose or Dubose can refer to:

== Surname ==
- Artist Dubose (born 1995), American rapper known as A Boogie wit da Hoodie
- Demetrius DuBose (1971–1999), American football player
- Doug DuBose (born 1964), American football player
- Dudley McIver DuBose (1834–1883), American Representative from Georgia and Confederate Army General
- Eric DuBose (born 1976), American baseball player
- Grant DuBose (born 2001), American football player
- Hampden Coit DuBose (1845–1910), Presbyterian missionary in China
- Horace Mellard DuBose (1858–1941), American Methodist bishop
- Jimmy DuBose (born 1954), American football player
- Judith DuBose (1698–1769), Colonial American heiress
- Kristi DuBose (born 1964), American jurist and judge
- Mike DuBose (born 1953), American football player
- Miriam Howard Dubose (1862–1945), American suffragist
- Samuel Vincent DuBose (c. 1972–2015), American shooting victim from Ohio
- Thomas DuBose (1902–1992,) US Air Force officer
- William DuBose (politician) (c. 1786–1855), American politician from South Carolina
- William Porcher DuBose (1836–1918), American Episcopal priest and theologian
- Winston DuBose, American soccer player

== Given name ==
- DuBose Heyward (1885–1940), American author best known for his 1925 novel Porgy
- DuBose Porter (born 1953), American politician from Georgia
- DuBose Ausley (born 1937), American lawyer from Florida

== Place ==
- Dubose Heyward House, a home of author Dubose Heyward
- DuBose Conference Center, a historic site at Fairmont and College Streets in Monteagle, Tennessee

== Fiction ==
- Kudzu Dubose, character in the comic strip Kudzu
- Mrs. Dubose, character in the novel To Kill a Mockingbird
- Vonn Dubose, character in the novel The Whistler

== See also ==
- Dubois (disambiguation)
- Dubos, a French surname
- Dubosc, a surname
