= La Rose Noire =

Swiss bakery, confectioner's, and pastry shop

- Company type: Bakery
- Founded: 1991
- Founder: Gérard Dubois
- Headquarters: Hong Kong
- Products: Baked goods
- Website: la-rose-noire.com

La Rose Noire is a chain of Swiss bakeries.

Conceived in 1991 by Swiss founder Gérard Dubois, the first La Rose Noire pâtisserie opened in Pacific Place, Admiralty, Hong Kong. As of 2012, now have 24 retail stores in Hong Kong.

La Rose Noire supplies to 34 countries in Europe, Asia and Australasia, Middle East and North America. La Rose Noire offers classical French and Swiss sweet delicacies, although some product lines are of the savoury variety.

In 2004 La Rose Noire opened their first production centre in Dongguan, China. Eight years later, in 2012, La Rose Noire opened their second production centre in Clark, Philippines.

La Rose Noire have produced several publications – in 2003, 2006 and 2011. The latest edition “Crafted Passion (2011) was awarded “Best Dessert Book in the World,” from the Gourmand Awards in Paris.
