= Pierre-Jean Croset =

French composer

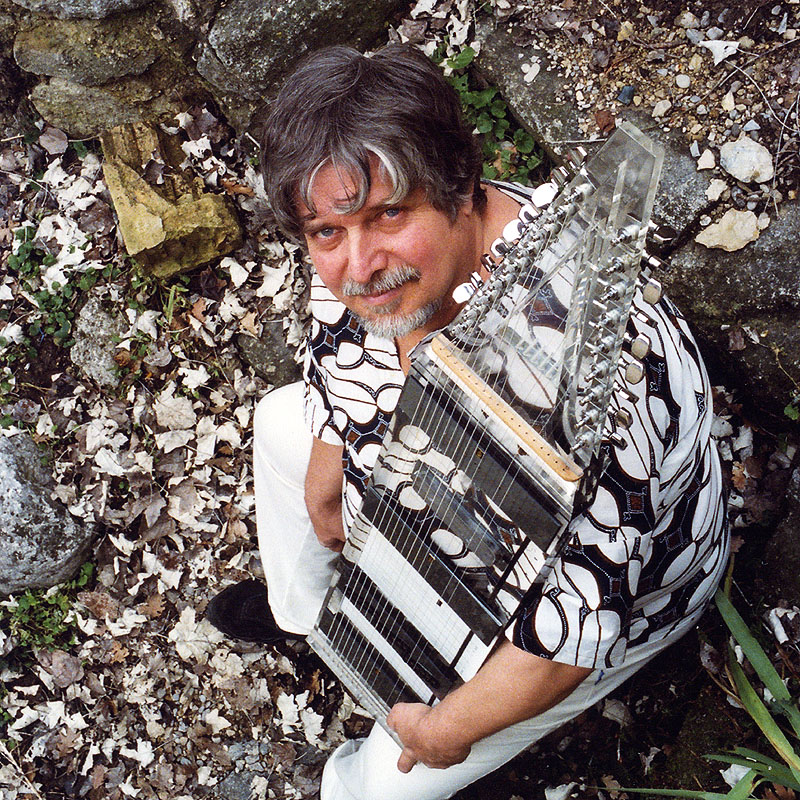
- Born: July 14, 1949 (age 76); Grenoble, France
- Occupations: Composer, an interpreter, a stringed-instrument maker and a French musicologist

Pierre-Jean Croset (born July 14, 1949, in Grenoble, France) is a composer, an interpreter, a stringed-instrument maker and a French musicologist.

== Early life ==
As a young boy, Pierre-Jean Croset was introduced to music theory by his mother, who taught literature and was a classical pianist. At the age of seven, he took private piano lessons with professor and composer Paul Pittion in Grenoble for six years. He also began to play the guitar at the age of thirteen. In 1969, he was the guitarist for a jazz group in Lyon.

Having earned a university degree in history and geography in 1970, he decided to specialize in musicology. He received his doctorate and graduated summa cum laude in 1991, supervised by the musicologist and philosopher Daniel Charles (Paris VIII). His thesis titled "By Going Back up Mugu Karnali, essay on the Music of Spheres" explores the relationship between music and spirituality. Fascinated by John Cage, he studied his famous "Notations" for several years.

In January 1976, he was invited by Maurice Fleuret to be part of "The Stand of the Young composers" at the Museum of Modern Art of Paris. Later he obtained a research grant from the Ministry of Culture (1982) to study the music and instruments of Bali and Central Java.

Thanks to the "Villa Medicis" "hors les murs" grant which he received in 1984, he travelled to the University of California, San Diego where he performed and lectured at the Center for Music Experiment in addition to Berkeley, Stanford, Oakland Mills College and UCLA. In 1975, he settled down in Provence where he performed in concerts for several years. During the Festival d'Avignon in 1985, he exhibited his musical instruments and performed for the Chartreuse of Villeneuve-lès-Avignon. Later he journeyed to the East to study its local instrumental productions: during 1986 in Nepal, 1987 in North India, 1988 in South India and in Indonesia during 1997 and 2002.

From 1970 till 1982, he studied a large number of western and oriental traditional instruments to establish which one corresponded best to his wants. As a proponent of a new stringed-instrument trend in improved acoustics, he decided to create his own instruments, "harmonic lyres" and guitars that delivered deeply harmonious natural sounds due to the specific choice of Savarez strings and isolation materials which do not produce interferences.

Giving free rein to his numerous musical projects and his video documentaries, he also became known for his new sound installations for gardens, and he created the association "Atelier de Création Musique et Paysage".

== Career ==
The stringed-instrument maker, Pierre-Jean Croset, is the son of an engineer father and inventor who worked for Altulor: a company that produced synthetic materials. As a result, during his childhood, Croset discovered the properties of a kind of PMMA called "Altuglas" (diffuser of light, transparent and bright) by diverting the usage of a PMMA blowpipe.

Inspired by the John Cage quote "to create new music it is necessary to create new tools", he was directed by the researcher and acoustician Émile Leipp, director of the Laboratory of Musical Acoustic (CNRS) of the University of Jussieu, Paris. He focused on inventing a musical instrument.

In 1974, his first glass Harmonic Lyre was made with altuglas. He had the opportunity to play this instrument at the tenth Biennial event of Paris in 1977 at the Museum of Modern Art in Paris. The electroacoustic lyre had 18 strings and at least two micro-sensors for each of the strings. By 2010, he had successfully designed four harmonic lyres, 3 glass guitars of PMMA and carbon fiber neck, "water drums" for John Cage's creation with the " percussions of Strasbourg" (1989), as well as various other original instruments which include musical wind mills, wind chimes, kalimbé, musical jackstraw in bamboo for children, musical boomerangs, and an acoustic game of bowls.

In 1986, he designed a musical instrument called "Geophone" for the city of music in Paris. The following year, he created a design of a PMMA Sarod for the musician Amjad Ali Kahn.

=== Musicology ===
In 1987, having studied Nepalese, Indonesian and Hindi cultures, he met with ethnomusicologist Alain Daniélou whose works he had been studying for over fifteen years. Daniélou taught Croset the principles concerning the study of musical scales, musical semantics and the comparative table of musical intervals.

As a musicologist and musician, he is particularly interested in the effects produced by sound according to the laws of audition, coupled with physiological and mental aspects. He defines this combination as "the just intonation". This intonation is evident (it opposes "the tempered intonation") in traditional musical cultures. While in India, in particular Southern India, he collected data on the musical properties of certain Tamil Nadu temples. For this study, he was awarded the "Romain Rolland" prize by the Foreign office (France) in 1987.

Since 1991, he has studied "musical and landscape art" which includes the sound of plants and trees.

== Publications ==
- "Guide parfait du compositeur parfait", magazine L’Originel N°8, Paris, fév-mars 1979.
- "Harmoniques du temps", Magazine Émergence, N°5, 1987.- "about the music of P.-J. Croset", Interval Magazine (U.S.A.), 1987.
- "Bronze musical instruments in Java and Bali". Percussive notes (U.S.A.), 1987
- "Sur la lyre harmonique", E.M.I. Vol III, N° 5, 1987
- "À propos des tambours d’eau", Revue d’esthétique N°13,14,15., Paris, 1988.
- "Musical Pillars in India" E.M.I., 1990

== Discography ==
- Concert live in originel centre : Danses dans le néant des grands dieux agiles, Atelier Musical de Provence AM001, 1979
- Harmoniques du temps Ocora N°558 661, 1986, dist "harmony Mundi", CA
- L’Art de la Lyre Harmonique. ARION, 2003
- Concert Live, 2010

=== Film music ===
- "Peuterey la Blanche" of Patrick Vallençant, movie about high-risk skiing. Prize of Festival de Trente (Italy, 1978)
- "El Gringo Eskiador" of Patrick Vallençant, a long movie about the extreme skiing, Video Public Edition, 1981 (prize du diable d’or and grand prix of the public, festival the mountain Festival of the diablerets)
- "Le Tire-Lyre", front Jean Dasque, movie about Pierre-Jean Croset. Prize France télévision FR3 for the best short film (1980)
- "Gandoum" of Laela Wali, preceded in California (1981)
- "The Instruments of God" from Pierre-Jean Croset ("The Song of the Sacred Stones in Southern India", with the help of the CNRS, 2009)
