= Dubosc =

Dubosc may refer to:

- André Dubosc (1866–1935), French actor
- Catherine Dubosc (born 1959), French operatic soprano
- Claude Dubosc (1682–1745?), French engraver
- Franck Dubosc (born 1963), French actor, comedian and artist
- Gaston Dubosc (1861–1941), French actor

== See also ==
- Duboscq
- Dubosq
