= Antoine Marini =

Antoine Marini (known in Latin as Anthonius Marini de Gratianopoli) was a 15th-century humanist, theologian and political thinker who, among other things, contemplated the establishment of a European Court of Justice and a pan-European parliament. He was born in Grenoble, France.

Marini's occupations included alchemy and mechanical engineering. From 1459 onward, Marini served as an adviser to King George Podiebrad of Bohemia, and in this office was mainly concerned with curtailing the political power of the Papacy and the growth of the Ottoman Empire after it had conquered Constantinople in 1453. In 1461, he published a treatise calling for the establishment of a federal union of all Christian states in Europe for the purpose of deciding on political matters out of considerations for the common interests of Europe, while establishing a counterweight to Papal authority, and blocking the advance of the Turkish Empire.

== Works ==
- De unione Christianorum contra Turcas (The union of Christians against the Turks, 1461)

== For further reading ==
- A. H. Wratislaw (ed.), Diary of an Embassy from King George of Bohemia to King Louis XI of France in the Year of Grace 1464 (London, 1871)
- Czechoslovak Academy of Sciences, The Universal Peace Organization of King George of Bohemia: A Fifteenth Century Plan for World Peace, 1462/1464 (Prague, 1964)
