= Frederic Dubois =

French painter

Frédéric Dubois (c. 1760 – c. 1822) was a French miniature painter and painter.

== Biography ==
Dubois was born c. 1760 and, according some sources, was a pupil of Johann Heinrich Schröder (1757 - 1812) and debuted as pastellist in the “Salon (Paris) de la Correspondance” of the 1780 with the portraits of Charles Juste de Beauvau, Prince of Craon and Comte Mimerel. His first miniatures can be dated to the mid-1780s. He was active in Paris until 1804 where he was the court painter of Louis Joseph, Prince of Condé and lived in rue Neuve des Petits Champs, 414 rue Neuve Saint Marc, 549 rue de Grammont, 27 place des Victoires. In the following years he worked in Saint Petersburg. There, as most sources state, he stayed until 1818 and in 1813 he was granted membership of Saint Petersburg Imperial Academy of Arts. In 1819–1820, he was exhibiting in different London locations but above all in Royal Academy. In England he lived in London, 22 Vine Street and then in 9 Panton Street near Leicester Square an area of the city known as an entertainment venue preferred by foreigners and where the great portrait painter Joshua Reynolds lived until 1792. Probably he died in c. 1822. During his stay in Saint Petersburg, very appreciated by the court of Alexander I of Russia, the artist taught at the Imperial Academy of Arts and painted a great number of portraits of royalties and aristocrats. He also portrayed French expatriates living in Russia's capital. His works of this period can be viewed in Moscow Pushkin Museum and Tretyakov Gallery, in Saint Petersburg Hermitage Museum and other Russian museum collections. Frederic Dubois not only painted in miniature, as can be seen in the oil portraits of two sisters from the Poilevé de la Guerinais Breton family in Rennes or in the portrait of a scientist with the Legion of Honor, but was also a printmaker and produced royalist caricatures now in the British Museum.

== Artwork ==
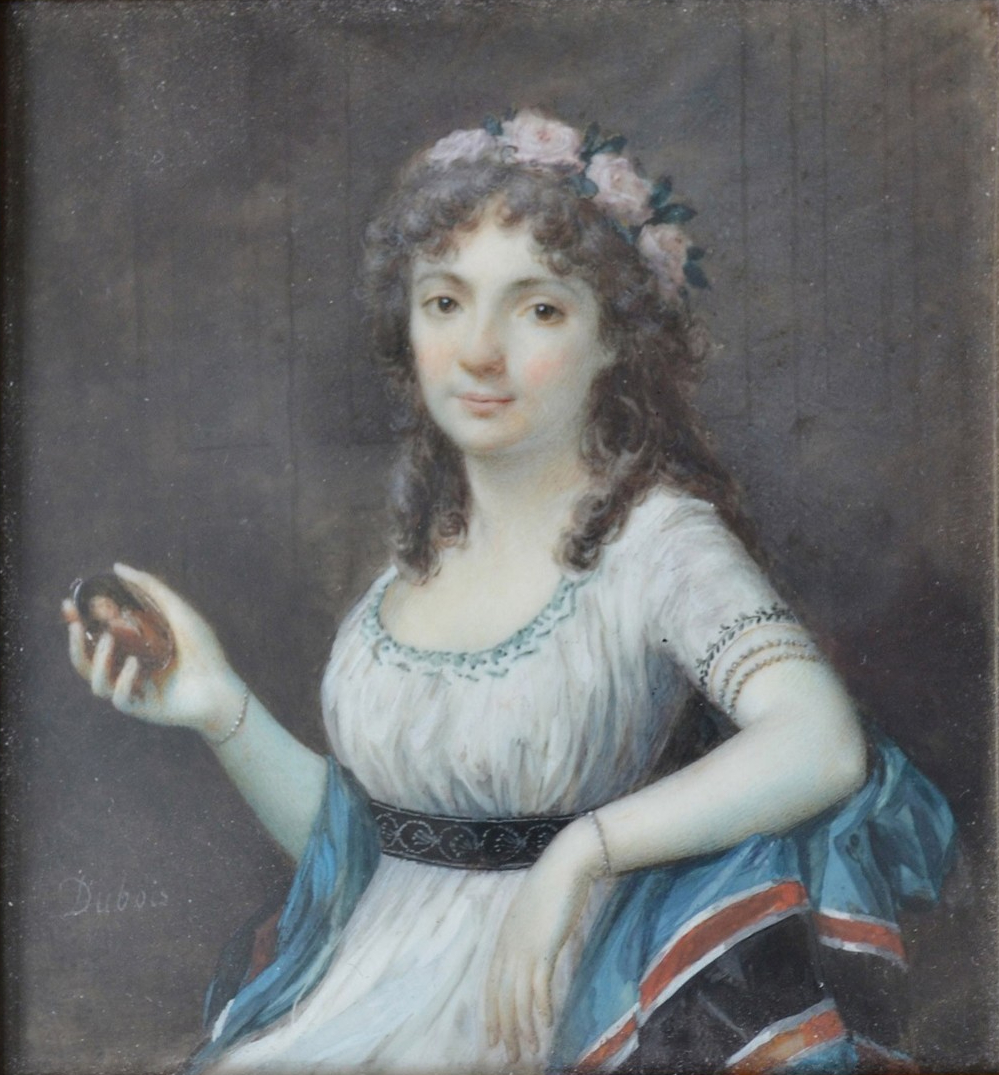
A lady wearing a white dress with a blue shawl and holding a miniature in her hand, circa 1790

His miniature are fresh and well drawn, very fine painted in small, crossed, narrow strokes, the general direction of which is from the upper right to the lower left. The backgrounds are usually treated in rather dark gouache, except in certain miniature towards the end of his career, when he executes the backgrounds in parallel hatchings entirely in the English style. In his best works he obtains soft chiaroscuro effects very close to Leonardo's nuanced. This technique allows him to give extreme sweetness to the sitters portrayed always represented in a psychological dimension of great depth and introspection. Some painters named Dubois worked at the end of the 18th century and the exact attribution of miniatures signed with this surname alone can sometimes be uncertain. In every case, among the artists with surname "Dubois" only Nicolas Dubois (1746 - 1826) was a miniature painter summoned by Louis XVI with a successful career in Spain and fortunately, the works signed by Frederic Dubois are, for the most part, marked "F. Dubois", which helps to avoid confusion even if some others are signed simply "Dubois" or "F. D."

== Works ==
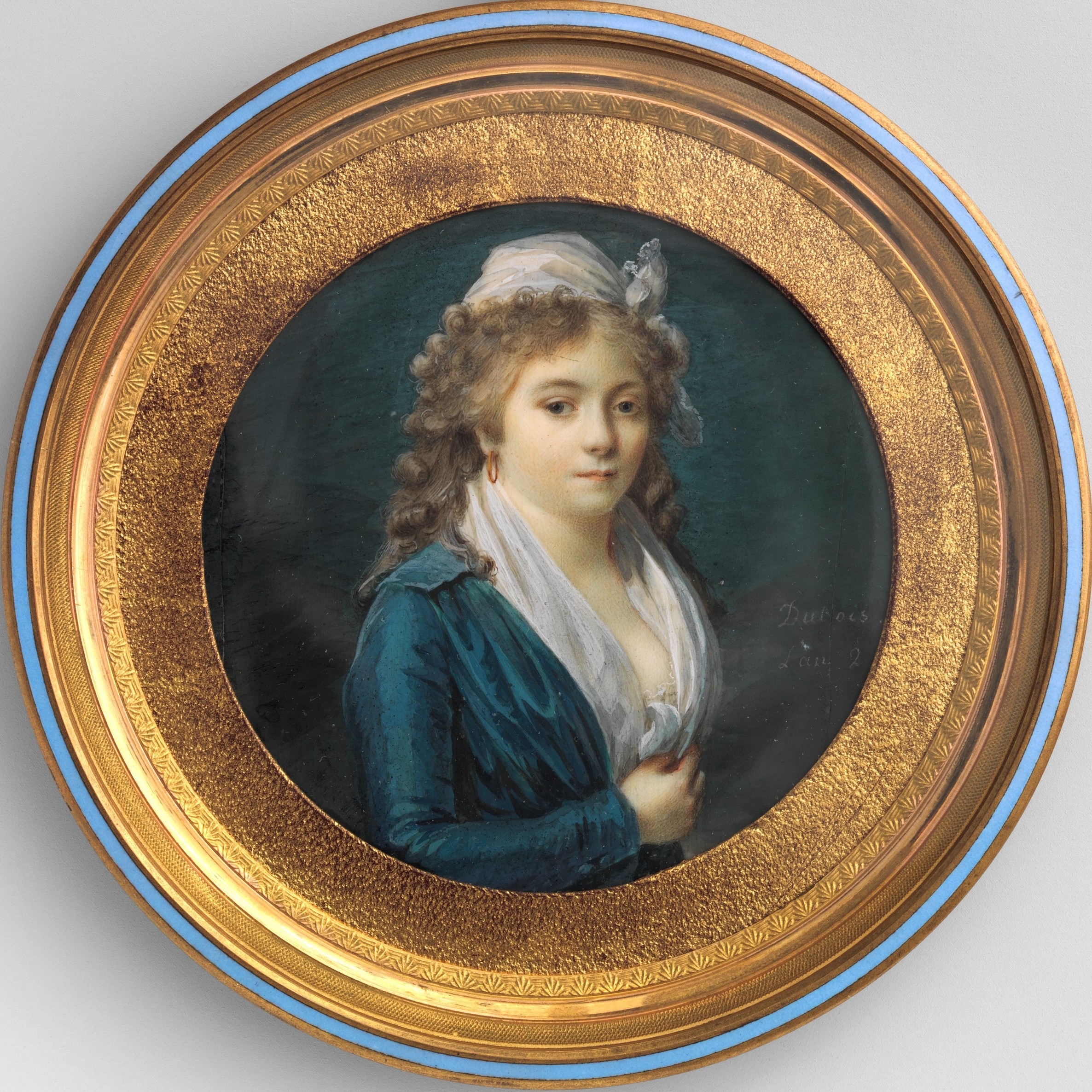
Portrait of a Woman, 1793/94 (Metropolitan Museum of Art)

- "Portrait of a Lady Writing a Letter" watercolor and gouache on ivory, c. 1795, The Cleveland Museum of Art
- "Portrait of grandmother and granddaughter", watercolor on ivory mounted on the lid of a box, c. 1785
- "Portrait of Marie Gabrielle Capet" watercolor and gouache on ivory, c. 1785, The Nelson-Atkins Museum of Art
- "Portrait of a Woman" watercolor and gouache on ivory, c. 1793, Metropolitan Museum of Art
- "Portrait of a lady in white dress with red scarf" watercolor and gouache on ivory, c. 1810, The Tansey Miniatures Foundation
- “Portrait o a lady with rose blossom in front of wooded landscape”, watercolor and gouache on ivory, c. 1796 The Tansey Miniatures Foundation
- “Portrait of a lady in spotted dress with red ribbons”, watercolor and gouache on ivory, c. 1795 The Tansey Miniatures Foundation
- “Portrait of a gentleman in a brown coat and a patterned waistcoat”, watercolor and gouache on ivory, c. 1795, The Tansey Miniatures Foundation
- "Portrait of a lady wearing a cream coloured dress with short sleeves and a white shawl" watercolor and gouache on ivory, c. 1800
- "Portrait of a member of Nelidov Family", watercolor and gouache on ivory, Hermitage Museum
- "Portrait of a young woman doing her hair", watercolor and gouache on ivory, c. 1805
- "Portrait of Maria Teresa Poniatowska", watercolor and gouache on ivory, National Museum, Kraków
- "Portrait of a young Russian lady, possibly a member of the Benckendorff family", watercolor and gouache on ivory,
- "Portrait of Grand Duchess Catherine Pavlovna of Russia" c. 1811 Watercolor and gouache on ivory, State Russian Museum-Reserve "Pavlovsk"
- "Portrait of Teofilia Ignatievna Chernysheva Radziwiłłowa, born Morawska" (1791–1828) widow of Prince Dominik Hieronim Radzivil, (Файл:Theophilie Radziwiłłowa.jpg), c.1810, Watercolor and gouache on ivory, State Russian Museum, St. Petersburg,
- "Portrait of a young man", c. 1810, Watercolor and gouache on ivory, Novgorod Museum,
- "Satirical prints" 10 etchings on paper hand-coloured, c.1815,
