= Jean Dubois (field hockey) =

Belgian field hockey player (1926–2021)

Jean Marie Joseph François Dubois (4 October 1926 – 28 January 2021) was a Belgian field hockey player who competed in four summer Olympics between 1948 and 1960. At the 1948 Summer Olympics in London, his team placed a tied 7th in a field of 13. At the 1952 Summer Olympics in Helsinki, he had his best result when his team placed an equal 5th in a field of 13. At the 1956 Summer Olympics in Melbourne, his team placed 7th out of a field of 12. At his final Olympic Games in 1960 in Rome, his team placed 11th out of 16 nations. In total, he played fifteen field hockey matches in all of his Olympic Games. Dubois died in January 2021 at the age of 94.
