= Adolphe DuBois d'Aische =

Flying ace (1874–1958)

Adolphe Aloys Marie Hubert du Bois d'Aische
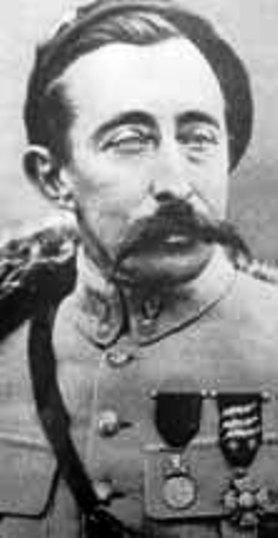
- Born: 18 March 1874; Brussels, Belgium
- Died: 7 October 1958 (aged 84); Saint-Quay-Portrieux, France
- Military career
- Allegiance: France
- Branch: Air Force
- Rank: Sergeant
- Unit: F71
- Awards: French Médaille militaire and Croix de Guerre

Sergeant Adolphe Alois de Gonzague Marie Hubert Ghislain du Bois d'Aische was a Belgian World War I flying ace credited with six aerial victories. Serving in the French Air Service, he was the oldest ace in the war, scoring his fifth (and sixth) victories when he was 43 years of age.

== Early life ==
d'Aische was born in Brussels in 1874. He was a scion (lineal descendant) of Walloon nobility whose lineage dated back to the 15th century. d'Aische moved to the Belgian Congo when his father opposed his desire to study engineering and attempted to arrange a suitable bride for his son. In 1904, he enlisted in the French Foreign Legion where he learnt to speak German and became a French citizen. d'Aische was living in Paris and working as an engineer when the Great War began in August 1914.

== First World War ==
d'Aische enlisted in the French army in 1914 and fought as an infantryman, seeing action on the Marne, the Argonne and at Vauquois. He was wounded in action in April 1915. After his recovery, he enlisted in the French Aéronautique Militaire in July 1915, first serving as a mechanic at the Avord aviation school and later training to be an observer/gunner at Cazaux. d'Aische, with the rank of Corporal, was assigned to an operational unit, Escadrille F.71, in April 1916 which was based at Commercy near Saint-Mihiel. The unit was assigned to fly reconnaissance duties for the VIII French army corps at Verdun.

The unit was equipped with Farman F40 two-seaters and d'Aische, flying as an observer with a pilot named Pierre Weiss, achieved his first confirmed aerial victory when he shot down a German Albatros over Varvinay on 22 May 1916. In January 1917, F.71 was transferred to Sainte-Menehould to support General Nivelle's coming spring offensive at Chemin des Dames. The squadron received the Salmson SM1 three-seat bombers and the unit experienced considerable action during this period. In early June, the SM1s were replaced with British-built Sopwith 1A2 two-seaters. On 3 June, d'Aische and pilot Jacques Fontaine were flying a patrol in a Sopwith when they were attacked by five German fighters. DuBois reported that he destroyed two of the enemy fighters and damaged a third which force-landed but he was officially credited with only one victory.

In July 1917, the unit received the new Dorand AR1 two-seaters. On the 24th of that month, d'Aische and a pilot named Henri Betis flew a Dorand accompanied by three others on a patrol over German lines. Attacked by seven German fighters from above, one Dorand was shot down and another was damaged and forced to retreat, a third Dorand flying alongside as escort. Now on their own, Dubois and Betis fought off the German attackers, d'Aische, manning a Lewis machine-gun, shooting down two of them. However their Dorand was badly damaged and Betis was wounded. They managed to reach Allied territory before crash-landing. Betis later died of his injuries but d'Aische survived unhurt. For this exploit, d'Aische was promoted to Sergeant.

Later in the summer of 1917, F71 was issued with three-seat Letord 1A3s and it was whilst flying as an observer in one of these that he achieved his final two victories. On 22 September, accompanied by pilot Jacques Fontaine and rear-seat gunner Lt Marcel Meunier, d'Aische destroyed an Albatros fighter over Cernay-en-Dormois and an enemy two-seater over Vouziers in a single sortie. Awarded the military medal, d'Aische was now officially an ace and, at the age of 43, was the oldest ace of the Great War. d'Aische wanted to become a pilot and he managed to secure a waiver on the normal age limit of 30 to train as a pilot. He left F71 in December 1917 and commenced his pilots training, securing his brevet in June 1918. However whilst undergoing advanced operational training in October 1918, he was injured in an accidental crash whilst piloting a SPAD fighter. The war ended the following month and d'Aische was demobilized in December 1918.

== Later life ==
d'Aische worked in civil aviation in the inter-war period. He lived in France during the German Occupation in the Second World War. His ability to speak German saw him employed by the occupiers as a translator and administrator until he was caught passing on information to the French Resistance. Imprisoned by the Germans, he survived to be liberated by the Allies in 1944. He spent the remainder of his life employed as a Municipal Councillor. He died on 7 October 1958, age 84.

== See also ==
- List of World War I aces from Belgium
