= Georges Toscan =

French librarian (1756–1826)

Georges Toscan (1 January 1756- 12 September 1826) was a French librarian and author.

== Biography ==
He was born in Grenoble. In 1794, he was appointed the first librarian of a new public Muséum d’Histoire Naturelle in Paris, in charge of a collection that contained 15,000 volumes. He participated in some translations, including regarding Lazzaro Spallanzani's travels through Italy and Sicily.

In the fall of 1792, Bernardin de Saint-Pierre was appointed as the new Intendant of the Jardin des Plantes in Paris. Upon inspecting the animals housed by the former king at Versaille, it was decided to establish a menagerie at the park, part of a new public Muséum d’Histoire Naturelle, a successor to the old Jardin du Roi. Georges in his position, published various peculiar observations on the animals in this menagerie.

He has been particularly remembered for his views and studies of animal behaviors. Highly influenced by the view of Rousseau that behavior can be molded and tamed by society, he wrote a text on a lion and his companion dog in the menagerie. He also published on the responses of Elephants to music.

== Works ==
- Histoire du lion de la ménagerie du Muséum national d'histoire naturelle, et de son chien, by G. Toscan Paris (1794).
- L'Ami de la nature, ou Choix d'observations sur divers objets de la nature et de l'art, suivi d'un Catalogue de tous les animaux qui se trouvent actuellement dans la ménagerie, par G. Toscan, Paris (1799)
- "Voyages dans les deux Siciles et dans quelques parties des Apennins..." of Lazzaro Spallanzani with Georges Toscan as Translator and notes by Faujas de St Fond. Paris (1799).
- Mémoire sur l'utilité de l'établissement d'une bibliothèque au Jardin des Plantes (1793)
