= Alphonse Dubois =

Belgian naturalist and ornithologist

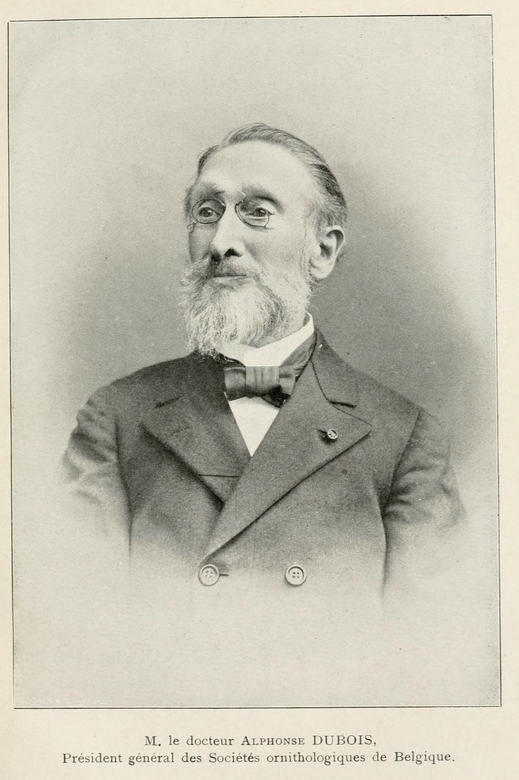
Alphonse Joseph Charles Dubois

Alphonse Joseph Charles Dubois (18 October 1839 at Aix-la-Chapelle – 1 June 1921 at Coxyde-sur-Mer) was a Belgian naturalist.

He took a doctorate in medicine, and in 1869 became curator of the department of vertebrates at the Royal Museum of Natural History in Brussels.

He worked with his father, Charles Frédéric Dubois (1804–1867), in the production of Les Oiseaux de l’Europe et leurs œufs, completing it after his father’s death. The book was in two volumes, the second consisting of illustrations by Dubois senior.

He produced the two-volume La Faune illustrée des Vertébrés de la Belgique.
