= Émile Dubois (murderer) =

Chilean criminal and serial killer (1867–1907)

Emile Dubois
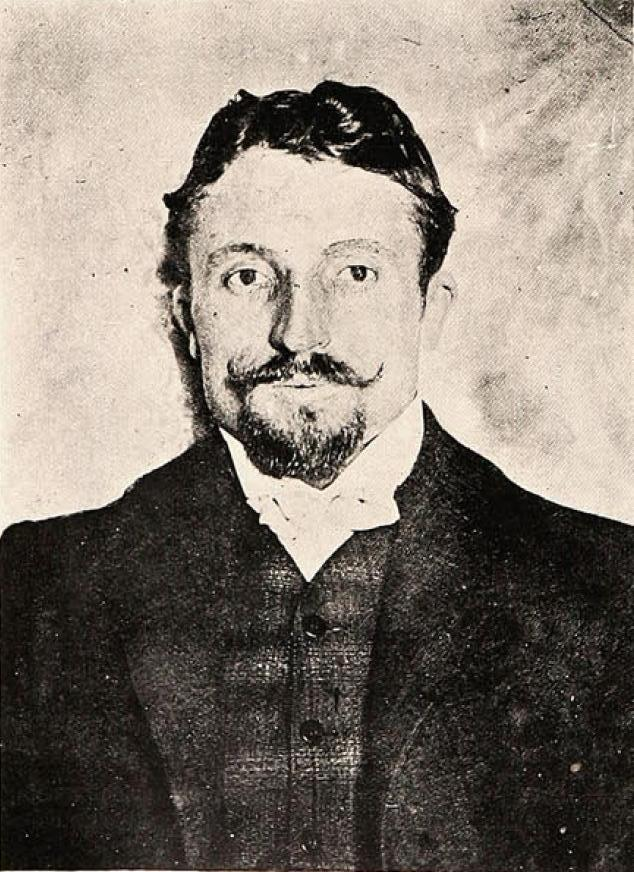
- Born: Louis-Amadeo Brihier Lacroix; 29 April 1867; Étaples, Pas-de-Calais, France
- Died: 26 March 1907 (aged 39); Valparaíso, Chile
- Cause of death: Execution by firing squad
- Other names: Emilio Dubois; Emilio Morales; Emile Murraley
- Children: 1
- Status: Executed
- Conviction: Murder
- Penalty: Death

Details
- Victims: 6
- Country: France, Brazil, Chile

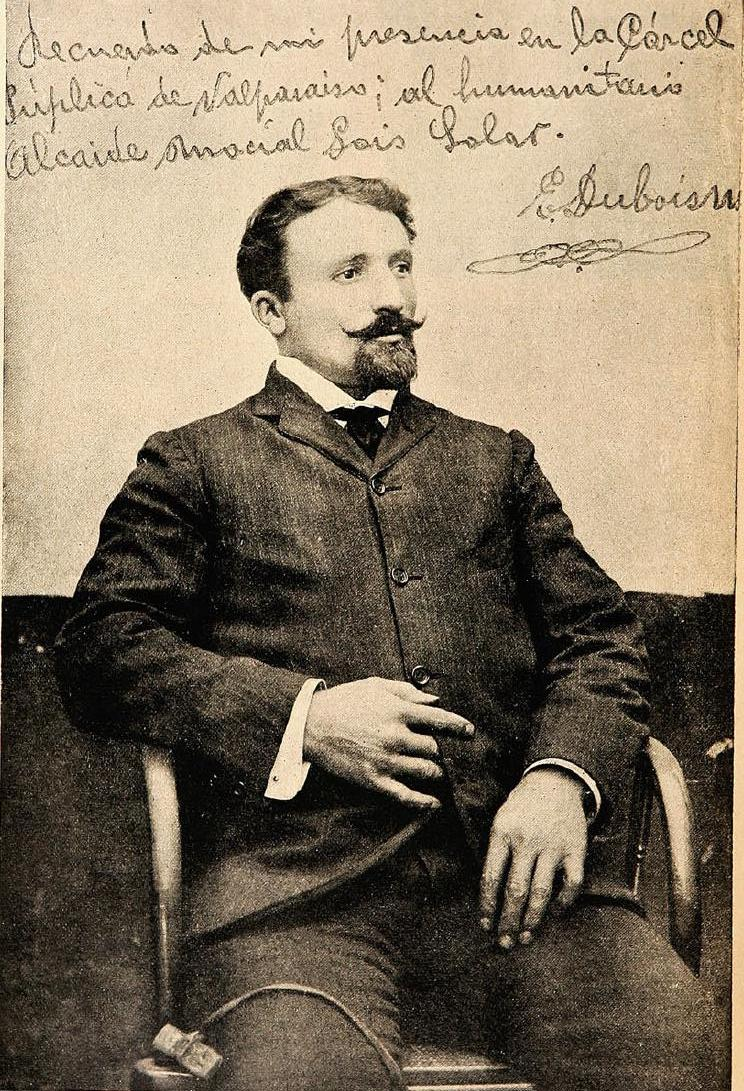
Undated photograph of Émile Dubois.

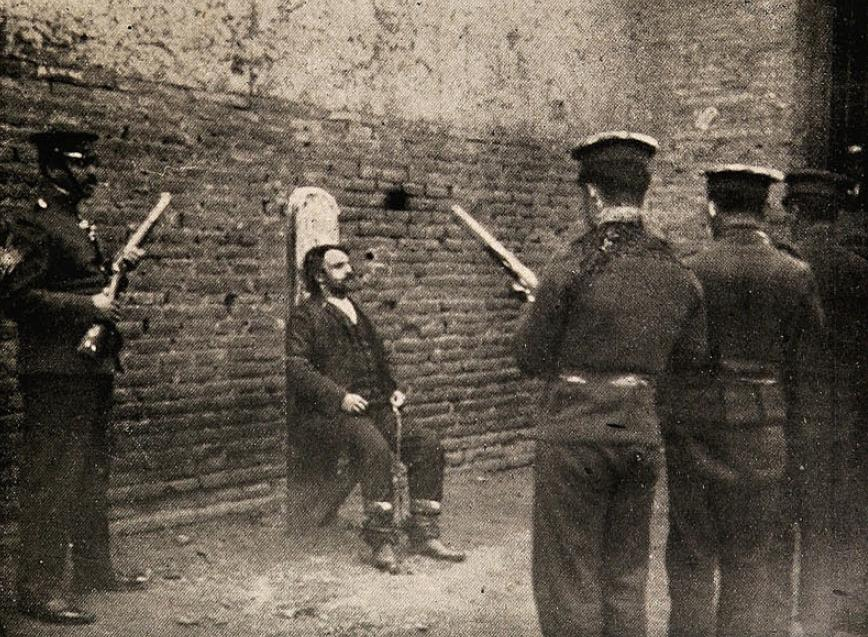
Émile Dubois said before his execution: "Execute me and well to the heart".

Louis-Amadeo Brihier Lacroix, better known as Émile Dubois (29 April 1867 – 26 March 1907) was a French serial killer and robber, known as a folk hero in Chile.

== Early life ==
Louis-Amadeo Brihier Lacroix was the son of Joseph Brihier and Marie Lacroix. At fifteen, he killed the father of his girlfriend, a retired policeman. He then worked as miner in Courrières for two years, until a foreman was found dead. After two months in prison for theft, he embarked for Venezuela at the age of twenty taking the name Émile Dubois. In 1903, aided by his two lovers Ursula Morales and her friend Catalina, he murdered a young Peruvian engineer in a trap laid in a brothel in Ouro, stealing the young man's savings.

=== Murder of Ernesto Lafontaine ===
Dubois' first recorded murder in Chile was on 7 January 1905. The mutilated body of Ernesto Lafontaine, a French merchant who served as the first mayor of Providencia, was found in Santiago by Roman Díaz, an alderman and personal friend of the victim, at the office desk that he had on Huérfanos street. Among other belongings, a gold watch, the keys to a safe and cash were missing. Eventually, this gold watch would be crucial evidence to establish Dubois' guilt in his trial in Valparaíso.

=== The murders in Valparaíso ===
In Valparaíso, three more murders occurred over the course of the next. On 4 September 1905, Reinald Tillmans, a German trader was killed. On 4 October of the same year, Gustave Titius, a German businessman, was found murdered with his hands mutilated. On 4 April 1906, Isidore Challe, another French merchant, was killed with six stab wounds at the entrance of his shop.

On June 26, 1906, he attempted to murder an English dentist called Charles Davies. The attack failed and he fled and was pursued and caught by crowds. Dubois was captured and sentenced to death. During the 1906 Valparaíso earthquake, the city's prison was heavily damaged and several prisoners were initially unaccounted for. Dubois was eventually found under a stack of canned food. Dubois was free of his shackles, clean-shaven and covered in a poncho, but did not explain how this happened and denied having made an escape attempt. The day before his execution, Dubois had a common-law marriage to his girlfriend Ursula Morales. He was finally executed by four riflemen on March 26, 1907.

== Popular legend ==
According to the chroniclers of the time, the victims of Dubois were usurers, so that the people termed him the Chilean Robin Hood, considering the murders as acts of justice of the proletariat against the bourgeoisie. Popular culture has since elevated him to the status of folk saint, transforming his grave (located in the Playa Ancha in Valparaiso) into a revered one, full of innumerable gifts and dedications.

== Fiction ==
The history of Émile Dubois and his enigmatic personality are treated in the novel All those deaths (1971) by Carlos Droguett, who won the Alfaguara prize that year.

It was also published in The Private Life of Émile Dubois by Chilean singer and writer Patricio Manns, who worked to reinterpret, revise and deepen the character of Droguett's novel.

== Biographies ==
There are at least two biographies of Émile Dubois, both published in 1907, the year of his execution. However, the improbability of the narrated facts, the total discordance between the two and the anonymity of the authors (in the case of the first one it is an alias and in the second the authors claimed to have transcribed a manuscript that arrived anonymously to them) it is presumable that both are apocryphal. These biographies are the following:

- Emile Dubois: Relación Verídica de sus crímenes y aventuras, Imprenta y litografía Universo, Valparaíso, 1907 by Inocencio del Campo
- La verdadera historia de Dubois: las memorias del célebre criminal: su vida en Francia, Inglaterra, Venezuela, Perú, Bolivia y Chile: sus compañeras Ursula y Elcira, Santiago de Chile, 1907 by E. Tagle M. and C. Morales F.

== See also ==
- List of serial killers by country
