= Pierre-Gilles Dubois =

Pierre-Gilles Dubois (1938–1995) was a sculptor and painter. He died in Sainte-Hyacinthe in 1995.

== Education ==
He was interested in painting from an early age, his first painting was in 1950. At 17 years old, he was admitted to the École des Beaux-Arts in Montreal and for five years he attended the workshops of several Jacques de Tonanncour R.C.A. and Stanley Cosgrove R.C.A.

During successive trips to Mexico and the United States, he was introduced to the work of sculpture on granite and the size of precious stones. While continuing his research in painting, he completed his training and obtained in 1965 his diploma of Psycho-educator. During his three-year course, he directs the plastic art workshops for children with emotional disorders.

== Career ==
From 1965, he worked as an artist and trained and directed art educators, and also taught human relations. He sold his drawings and paintings every year. After eight years of intense activity, he began to be more focused on developing works of art.

Since 1970, he has been actively visualizing in his works his plastic and social experience by introducing, by the unconditional acceptance of others, an imagery that takes into account the theory of the archetypes of Carl C. Jung.

In the fall of 1975, the city of Lachine commissioned him to execute a monumental sculpture at a cost of $55,000, from an 11-ton volcanic blue stone imported from Norway. The figurative work unveiled on June 24, 1977, in place of the City Hall of Lachine, represents the four elements and is entitled La Fontaine de Vie. He was awarded the title of Citizen of Honor, a title given to very few citizens since the founding of the city, for his work.

Dubois, in his works, reveals a full strength, a moving personality. It is a force of nature that goes to the end of itself. The originality of his work is both powerful and moving, which explains the interest of collectors and guarantees their value.

In 1982 he asked many painters to create the Galerie des Maîtres with: Claude Dubois artist, signer and performer, Claude Péloquin poet, speaker, artist and painter. Daniel Lavoie Art Teacher, artist and painter, Michèle Royer painter, Carole Turgeon painter, Liliane fortier painter, Michel Pellus painter, René Delbuquet Photograph.

1986 He painted the upper wall of the Lachine counsel city hall with Jacques Cartier story, with his interpretation. Michel Pilon Restoration has created the multiple base for his painting in March 1986

== Exhibitions ==
Lachine, Town Hall, La Fontaine de Vie 1977 Galerie Colbert, 1978 Galerie des Maîtres 1982 Gallery Minigal, Exhibition The Verb 1983 Lachine, Boardroom, Cartier 1984 He is also represented in numerous private and public collections in America, Europe and Israel.

La Ville de Montréal lui consacre sa page https://artpublic.ville.montreal.qc.ca/oeuvre/fontaine-de-vie/

== See also ==
- List of public artworks in Montreal

== Sources ==
Signature Pierre-Gilles Dubois, Yves Thériault Édition Marcel Broquet 1981 La Ville de Montréal lui consacre sa page https://artpublic.ville.montreal.qc.ca/oeuvre/fontaine-de-vie/
