= Claude Prouvoyeur =

French politician (1927–2018)

Senator from Nord
- In office 25 September 1983 – 1 October 1992
- Preceded by: Jean Varlet

Mayor of Dunkirk
- In office 18 September 1966 – 19 March 1989
- Preceded by: Paul Asseman
- Succeeded by: Michel Delebarre

Personal details
- Born: 5 January 1927 Estourmel, France
- Died: 17 January 2018 (aged 91) Dunkirk, France

Claude Prouvoyeur (5 January 1927 – 17 January 2018) was a French politician.

Born in 1927, Prouvoyeur was raised in Cateau. He moved to Dunkirk and began teaching at Lycée Jean-Bart in the late 1950s. Prouvoyeur was named deputy mayor of the commune in charge of finance in 1965, and assumed the mayoralty upon the death of Paul Asseman. While the mayor of Dunkirk, Prouvoyeur concurrently served in multiple positions on the Nord regional council. He was elected to the Senate in 1983 as a representative for Nord, yielding the mayorship of Dunkirk to Michel Delebarre in 1989. Prouvoyeur left the Senate in 1992, and died at the age of 91 on 17 January 2018.
