= Ouro =

- Municipality
- The Municipality of Ouro
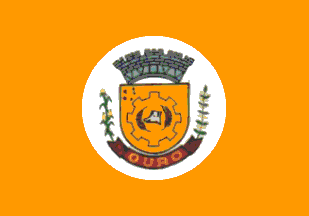
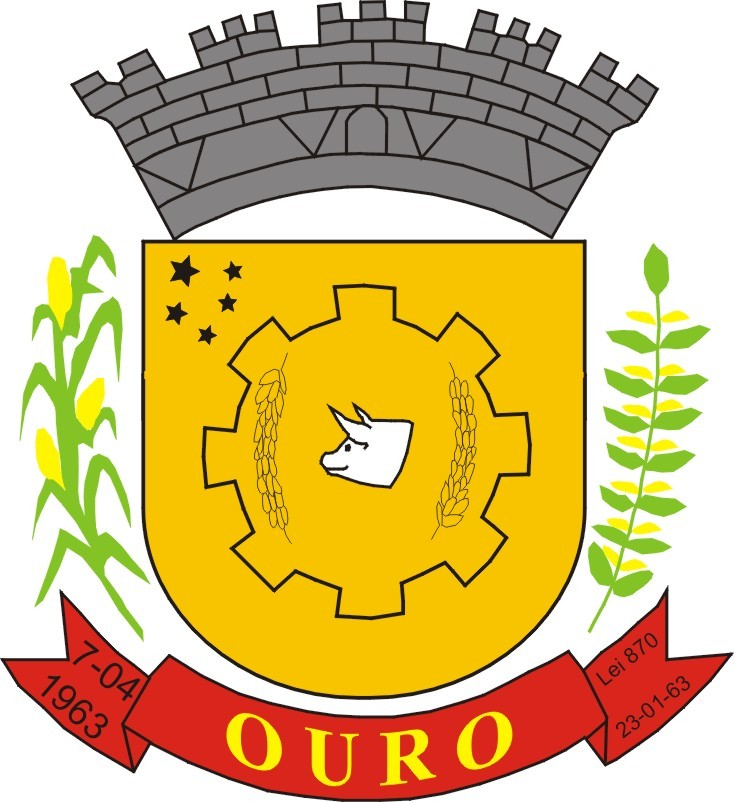
- Flag Coat of arms

- Location of Ouro in Santa Catarina state
- Coordinates: 27°19′51″S 51°35′57″W
- Country: Brazil
- Region: South
- State: Santa Catarina
- Founded: April 7, 1961

Government
  - Mayor: Neri Luiz Miqueloto (DEM)

Area
  - Total: 206.229 km^{2} (79.625 sq mi)
- Elevation: 485 m (1,591 ft)

Population (2020)
  - Total: 7,272
  - Density: 35.26/km^{2} (91.33/sq mi)
- Time zone: UTC-3 (UTC-3)
  - Summer (DST): UTC-2 (UTC-2)
- HDI (2000): 0.828 – high
- Website: www.ouro.sc.gov.br

Ouro is a municipality in the state of Santa Catarina in the South region of Brazil.

== See also ==
- List of municipalities in Santa Catarina
