= Arthur Dubois =

American hip-hop artist (c. 1947 – 2022)

Arthur Dubois (c. 1947 – October 23, 2022) was an American hip-hop artist and music producer from Chicago.

== Musical career ==
Dubois specialized in making trap music. He began teaching himself how to make music as a hobby in 2013, when he was 66 years old.

== Personal life and death ==
Dubois was the father of two children and also a grandfather. He died on October 23, 2022.
