= François Dubois (19th century) =

French painter

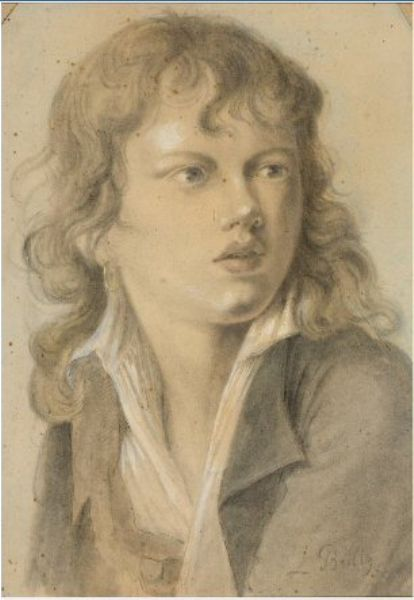
- François Dubois, Self-portrait
- Born: 1790; France
- Died: 1871 (aged 80–81)
- Known for: Painter
- Style: Neoclassical
- Movement: Orientalist

François Dubois (1790–1871) was a French neoclassical and Orientalist painter.

== Life and career ==
François Dubois (1790–1871) was a French neoclassical painter. He made several large oil paintings on historical subjects such as l'Érection de l'obélisque de Louqsor sur la place de la Concorde ("The erection of the Luxor obelisk on the place de la Concorde", on view at the Musée Carnavalet in Paris) and mythological subjects such as Le Sommeil d'Oreste ("The Dream of Orestes", which is at the Musée des Beaux-Arts in Quimper, France). Some of his works are also displayed at the Palace of Versailles.

== Gallery ==
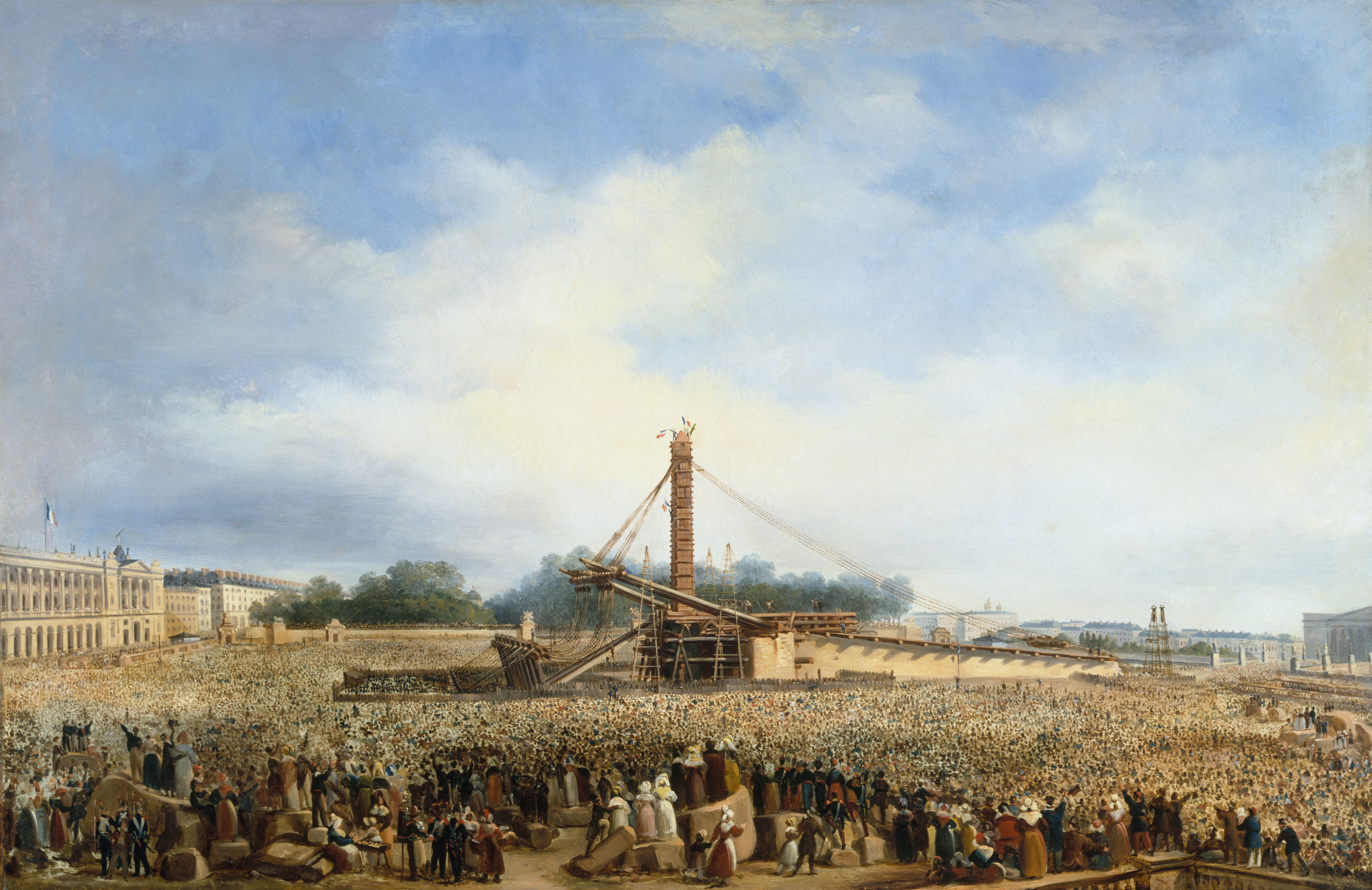
The erection of the Luxor obelisk on the place de la Concorde by François Dubois. Musée Carnavalet, Paris

== See also ==
- List of Orientalist artists
- Orientalism
