= Jacques Bialski =

French politician

Member of the French Senate for Nord
- In office 1979–1997
- Preceded by: René Debesson
- Succeeded by: Dinah Derycke

Personal details
- Born: 3 October 1929 Dunkirk, France
- Died: 10 June 2013 (aged 83) Dunkirk, France
- Party: Socialist Party

Jacques Bialski (3 October 1929 – 10 June 2013) was a French politician, who was a member of the Senate for Nord (1979–1997).
