= Marie-Christine Blandin =

French politician (born 1952)

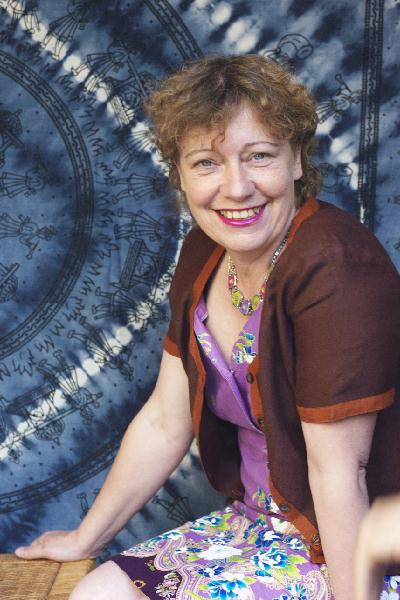
- Marie-Christine Blandin in 2005

President of the National Commission for Ethics and Alerts in Public Health and the Environment
- In office 20 January 2017 – 3 May 2019
- Preceded by: Commission established
- Succeeded by: Denis Zmirou-Navier

Member of the French Senate
- In office 1 October 2001 – 3 July 2017
- Succeeded by: Anne-Lise Dufour-Tonini
- Constituency: Nord

Chair of the Commission for Culture, Education and Communication
- In office 6 October 2011 – 30 September 2014
- Preceded by: Jacques Legendre
- Succeeded by: Catherine Morin-Desailly

President of the Regional Council of Nord-Pas-de-Calais
- In office 31 March 1992 – 20 March 1998
- Preceded by: Noël Josèphe
- Succeeded by: Michel Delebarre

Personal details
- Born: 22 September 1952 (age 73) Roubaix, France
- Party: The Greens (1984–2010); EELV (2010–2014); DVG (since 2014)
- Occupation: Science teacher

Marie-Christine Blandin (born 22 September 1952, Roubaix) is a member of the Senate of France, representing the Nord department. She is a member of Europe Écologie–The Greens.

A member of the Greens and then of Europe Ecology The Greens until 2014, she was president of the regional council of Nord-Pas-de-Calais from 1992 to 1998 and senator from 2001 to 2017.

== Bibliography ==
- Page on the Senate website (in French)
