= Sylvie Desmarescaux =

French politician (born 1950)

Senator of Nord
- In office 23 September 2001 – 30 September 2011

Mayor of Hoymille
- In office 18 March 2001 – 30 March 2014
- Preceded by: Jacques Vandenbavière
- Succeeded by: Daniel Thamiry

Personal details
- Born: 6 September 1950 (age 75) Bergues, France
- Party: DVD / NI
- Parent: Roger Drapie (father)
- Occupation: Social worker

Sylvie Desmarescaux (born 6 September 1950) is a French politician and a former member of the Senate of France. She represented the Nord department from 2001 to 2011.
