= Geneviève Duboscq =

French author (1933–2018)

Genevieve Duboscq (9 April 1933 – 28 February 2018 in Chémeré-le-Roi) was a French author who wrote the best selling My Longest Night – A twelve-year-old heroine's stirring account of D-Day and after. It was originally published in French under the title Bye bye, Genevieve!

She received the Legion of Honor from the French Government and she and her family received America's Guard of Honor in recognition of the assistance that she and her family gave the US 82nd Airborne Division during the invasion of France in 1944 by the Allies.

== Bibliography ==
- My Longest Night – A twelve-year-old heroine's stirring account of D-Day and after, Genevieve Duboscq, Editions Random House, 1981. ISBN 0-86579-005-1
