= Dinah Derycke =

French politician

Member of the French Senate for Nord
- In office 1997–2002

Personal details
- Born: 1 April 1946 Armentières, France
- Died: 19 January 2002 (aged 55) Lille, France
- Party: Socialist Party
- Education: École Nationale des Impôts
- Profession: Tax inspector

Dinah Derycke (1 April 1946 – 19 January 2002) was a French politician of the Socialist Party.

== Biography ==
Dinah Derycke first became an activist at the age of eighteen at the Northern Federation of the Socialist Party. After earning a master's degree in public law, and studying at the École Nationale des Impôts, she was appointed an inspector of taxes for Roubaix in 1968. In the same year, she joined the General Confederation of Labour (CGT). In 1982, she was appointed the regional delegate on the rights of women for Nord-Pas-de-Calais. Her first elected position was as a regional councillor for Nord-Pas-de-Calais, and in 1989 as municipal councillor in Croix.

In 1991, she became a technical advisor to Michel Delebarre, then Minister of State for Planning and Municipalities, and the following year, she was appointed external counsel to the Court of Audit (Cour des comptes). In 1995, she was elected to the municipal council at Lys-lez-Lannoy. Although she was the leading socialist candidate in the 2001 mayoral election, she narrowly failed to unseat the incumbent, Daniel Chabasse, who obtained 55% of the vote.

However, she became a Senator of France on 3 July 1997 (replacing Jacques Bialski following his resignation) and was elected on 23 September 2001. In 1998, she was elected vice-president of the Senate Law Committee, and draftsman of the justice budget. During her time as a senator, she held many other posts, including Vice Chair of the Commission des lois constitutionnelles, de législation, du suffrage universel, du règlement et d'administration générale (Committee on Constitutional laws, legislation, suffrage, and general administration). .

She is perhaps best known for presiding over the Delegation of Women's Rights inquiry into Prostitution in France, in the Senate, whose final report (2001) bears her name. She was also temporarily assigned to the Ministry for Employment and Solidarity during this time.

Her career was cut short by a fatal illness in 2002. The Lycée in Villeneuve-d'Ascq was named after her.

== See also ==
Prostitution in France
