= Jerome Xavier DuBois =

Taiwanese singer

- Born: Montreal, Quebec
- Origin: Taiwan
- Genres: Mandopop
- Occupations: Singer, musician
- Website: www.jxdmusic.com

Jerome Xavier DuBois (Chinese: 杜杰; pinyin: dùjíe) is a Canadian-born Taiwanese mandopop singer and songwriter. Like Aska Yang (Chinese: 楊宗緯) and Yoga Lin (Chinese: 林宥嘉), DuBois made his international debut on CTV's One Million Star (Chinese: 超級星光大道).

== Early life ==
DuBois was born in Montreal, Quebec. He began writing his own music at age seven, and shortly after, began performing at Vancouver's Granville Island on weekends. While in elementary school, DuBois was invited to join the British Columbia Children's Honour Choir. In high school he participated in drama, musical, and LGBT clubs.

== Musical career ==
=== 3rd Canadian Chinese Songwriter's Quest ===
In 1998 DuBois competed and won first place in both divisions at the 3rd Canadian Chinese Songwriter's Quest on Fairchild TV. He was the first caucasian to enter, and also the first mandarin song to ever win (previous years were all cantonese songs). At this point in time, DuBois was in the middle of his software engineering studies at the University of British Columbia and decided to complete his degree. DuBois's song Awake In The Dream (Chinese: 醒在夢裡), with lyrics written by long-time friend Johnny Chiang, was played over the Chinese radio stations Canada-wide and he appeared on Chinese television several times. He performed throughout the lower mainland at venues including the Michael J Fox theatre, the Plaza of Nations, and Stanley Park following Emil Chau 周華建. Jerome published his first single in the CHKG World Music Spectacular '98 (collection) / (custom release from CHKG radio, Vancouver BC). The song was recently used by Rick Steves on his radio show (Program 130: An American Travel Guide to China, Airdate: April 12, 2008).

=== Dave Wang (Chinese: 王傑) ===
After winning the national songwriting contest, celebrity singer and songwriter Dave Wang (Chinese: 王傑) contacted DuBois and became his mentor. Dave recorded his own version of DuBois's song Awake In The Dream (Chinese: 醒在夢裡), and used it as the theme song of his radio show on Fairchild Radio. Dave's version of DuBois's song is available online here: 王傑 醒在夢裡

=== One Million Star ===
In 2008 DuBois became the first caucasian to qualify for Taiwan Television's hit show One Million Star (超級星光大道), an international singing contest similar to American Idol scouting talent from Taiwan, Singapore, Malaysia, Japan and the United States. Jerome competed under the Taiwan division, passing the 100 contestant elimination round with his performance of Jay Chow's "Silence" (Chinese: 安靜). He continued on the show, receiving continued acclaim from the judges for his accuracy in Chinese pronunciation. It was immediately apparent that his singing was honest, heartfelt and emotional. At the top twenty elimination round, Jerome performed his song "一起過好" (music and lyrics both written by Jerome). The song was broadcast internationally, marking his place in history as the first caucasian Taiwanese mandopop singer and songwriter. Despite his achievement, he received a low score of 12/25 for his performance, eliminating him from the show and subsequently causing internet fans to protest the decision to such an extent that the protests made the entertainment section of the national China Times newspaper. Despite being eliminated from the show, Jerome relocated to Taipei vowing to continue writing music for his fans. He is working on his next album release.
