= Charles-Victor Dubois =

Belgian composer and harmonium player

Charles-Victor Dubois (1832 – 1869) was a Belgian composer and harmonium player known mostly for improvisations and demonstrations.

== Biography ==
Victor Dubois was born in Lessines in the province of Hainaut. After losing his sight as a child, he entered a School for the Blind in Brussels, where he received music education. Gifted with a great affinity for music, he was contacted by the Brussels harmonium-builders Merklin & Schütz, and became a master of the instrument. He was noted for his understanding of the registers and effects, and for his improvisations. He was later appointed Professor of Harmonium in the Conservatoire.

He died from typhoid in Ixelles, one of the many victims of the 1869 outbreak.

== Works ==
His published works include:

- Méthode pour harmonium (Brussels, 1859)
- Three melodies for harmonium (Brussels, 1857)
- Pastoral (Brussels, 1858)
- Caprice (Brussels, 1858)
- 6 Compositions pour harmonium (Brussels, Schott Frères, n.d.)
- Trois Méditations pour Harmonium (Brussels, J.B. Katto, n.d.)
- l'Aurore Musicale ‒ Graduels et Offertoires pour orgue ou harmonium (Brussels, J.B. Katto, n.d.)
