= Ivan Renar =

French politician (1937–2022)

Member of the Senate
- In office 2 April 1985 – 30 September 2011
- Preceded by: Gérard Ehlers
- Parliamentary group: Communist, Republican, Citizen and Ecologist group
- Constituency: Nord

Personal details
- Born: 26 April 1937 Roubaix, France
- Died: 29 May 2022 (aged 85) France
- Party: French Communist Party

Ivan Renar (26 April 1937 – 29 May 2022) was a member of the Senate of France, representing the Nord department. He was a member of the Communist, Republican, and Citizen Group.
