= Michelle Demessine =

French politician (born 1947)

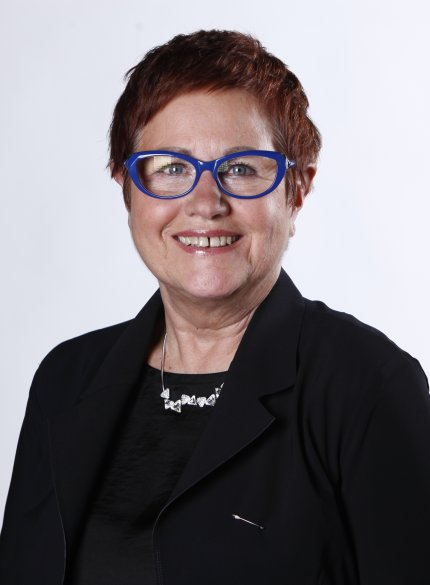
Michelle Demessine in 2015

Michelle Demessine (born 18 June 1947) is a member of the Senate of France, representing the Nord department. She is a member of the Communist, Republican, and Citizen Group.

== Honors and awards ==
Knight of the Order of Legion of Honour
