= Gérard Dubois (chef) =

- Born: Switzerland
- Occupations: Businessman, chef
- Organization: La Rose Noire
- Website: la-rose-noire.com

Gérard Dubois is a Swiss-born pastry chef, businessman, and the founder of La Rose Noire.

Dubois studied and apprenticed as a pastry chef in Villars, Switzerland.

In 1982, he worked for Hilton Hotel in Gatwick and later was sent to Hilton Hotel in Istanbul then Guam. In 1986, he was sent to Hilton Shanghai for its opening. Due to problems of not having enough ingredients at that time, he trained about 70 people to do ingredients from scratch such as butter, pasteurized milk, ice cream, chocolates to serve many outlets. He worked there for two years. In 1988, he was transferred to Hilton Hong Kong.

In 1991, Gérard left Hilton and decided to start La Rose Noire Pâtisserie in Pacific Place Hong Kong. In 1994, he and La Rose Noire started supplying bakery products to local supermarkets.

Gérard, together with his business partner Roger Geisser, decided to open the La Rose Noire factory in China in 2002. Years later, their company started supplying 2,000 Starbucks cafes across China and in 2008, they also became one of the official supplier of Beijing Olympics. But the costs in China were going up, and it became financially difficult for them to continue the factory. Luckily for them, there were many companies who wanted to acquire the factory. So they eventually sold the factory to Délifrance and moved La Rose Noire operations to the Philippines.

In 2012, Gérard started building La Rose Noire factory in the Philippines. La Rose Noire factory is situated in Clark Freeport Zone, employing over 3,000 staff.

La Rose Noire has produced several publications – in 2003, 2006 and 2011. Crafted Passion (2011) was awarded 'Best Dessert Book in the World,' from the Gourmand Awards in Paris.

Aside from being an entrepreneur, Gérard is a philanthropist. He also opened La Rose Noire Training Center in the Philippines, part of his charitable foundation where they teach students to become pastry chefs and chocolatiers.
