= Michel Delebarre =

French politician (1946–2022)

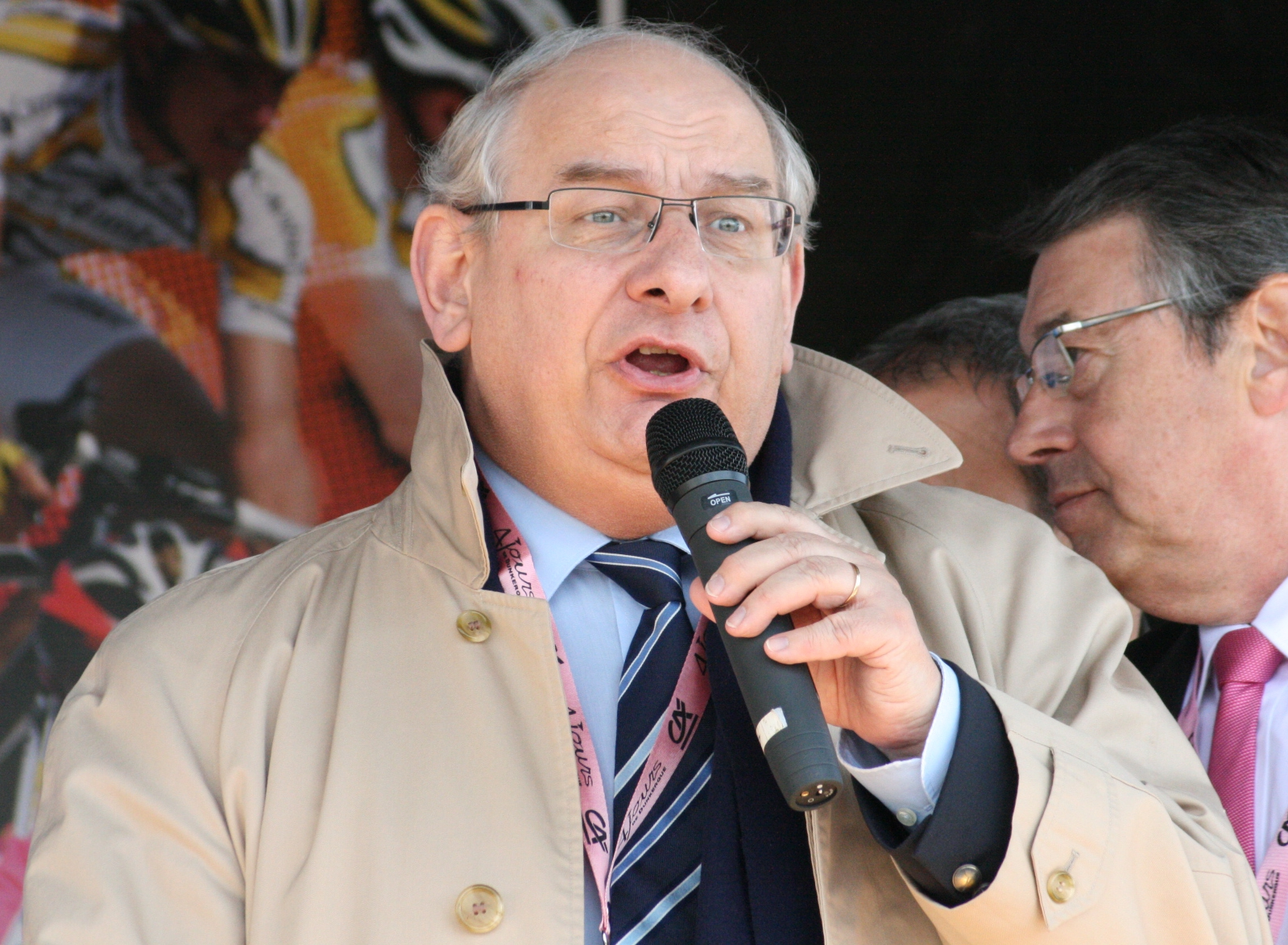
- Delebarre in 2010

Member of the Senate for Nord
- In office 1 October 2011 – 1 October 2017
- Preceded by: Pierre Mauroy
- Succeeded by: Frédéric Marchand

Mayor of Dunkirk
- In office 20 March 1989 – 5 April 2014
- Preceded by: Claude Prouvoyeur
- Succeeded by: Patrice Vergriete

President of the Regional Council of Nord-Pas-de-Calais
- In office 1998–2001
- Preceded by: Marie-Christine Blandin
- Succeeded by: Daniel Percheron

Minister of Transport and the Sea
- In office 28 June 1988 – 21 December 1990
- President: François Mitterrand
- Prime Minister: Michel Rocard
- Preceded by: Louis Mermaz
- Succeeded by: Louis Besson

Personal details
- Born: 27 April 1946 Bailleul, France
- Died: 9 April 2022 (aged 75) Lille, France
- Party: Socialist Party

Michel Delebarre (French pronunciation: [miʃɛl dələbaʁ]; 27 April 1946 – 9 April 2022) was a French politician who was a member of the Senate of France. He represented the Nord department, and was a member of the Socialiste, radical, citoyen et divers gauche. He was also mayor of Dunkirk.

Michel Delebarre graduated with a degree in Geography. In 1982, he was appointed Head of Private Office for Prime Minister Pierre Mauroy. During François Mitterrand's Presidency he held several ministerial posts between 1984 and 1986 and between 1988 and 1993. His portfolios included: Labour, Social Affairs, Transport, and the Public Service. He was also appointed the first Minister for urban planning.

In 1989, Michel Delebarre was elected Mayor of Dunkirk (re-elected in 1995, 2001, 2008) and in 2002 he was elected as a member of the French National Assembly on behalf of the Parti Socialiste (re-elected in 2007). From 1998 to 2001 he was President of the Regional Council of "Nord-Pas-de Calais". From 1999 until 2008, Michel Delebarre chaired the largest French Association of Social Housing (Union Sociale pour l'Habitat) representing 820 local branches with a 5 mln rental housing stock.

Involved in the wiretap scandal (President François Mitterrand and Jean-Edern Hallier), he was condemned by justice in 2005.

In February 2006 he was elected President of the Committee of the Regions of the European Union (CoR). Between February 2008 and 2010, he was First Vice-President of the CoR. Delebarre dies in Lille on 9 April 2022 at the age of 75.

== Political career ==
Governmental functions

Minister of Labour, Employment, and Vocational training : 1984–1986.

Minister of Social Affairs and Employment : May–June 1988.

Minister of Transport and Sea : 1988–1989.

Minister of Equipment, Housing, Transport and the Sea : 1989–1990.

Minister of State, minister of City : 1990–1991.

Minister of State, minister for City and Planning : 1991–1992.

Minister of State, minister of Public Service and Administrative Reforms : 1992–1993.

Electoral mandates

National Assembly of France

Member of the National Assembly of France for Nord (French department) (13th constituency) : 1986–1988 (Became minister in 1988) / 1997–1998 (Resignation) / 2002–2011 (Elected senator). Elected in 1986, reelected in 1988, 1997, 2002, 2007.

Senate of France

Senator of Nord (departement) : Since 2011. Elected in 2011.

Regional Council

President of the Regional Council of Nord-Pas-de-Calais : 1998–2001 (Resignation).

Vice-president of the Regional Council of Nord-Pas-de-Calais : 1986–1998. Reelected in 1992.

Regional councillor of Nord-Pas-de-Calais : 1986–2002 (Resignation). Reelected in 1992, 1998.

Municipal Council

Mayor of Dunkirk : Since 1989. Reelected in 1995, 2001, 2008.

Municipal councillor of Dunkirk : Since 1989. Reelected in 1995, 2001, 2008.

Urban Community Council

President of the Urban Community of Dunkirk : Since 1995. Reelected in 2001, 2008.

Member of the Urban Community of Dunkirk : Since 1989. Reelected in 1995, 2001, 2008.
