= Émile-Jules Dubois =

French medical doctor and politician

- Born: 28 December 1853; Saint-Léonard-de-Noblat, Haute-Vienne, France
- Died: 7 May 1904 (aged 50); Paris, France
- Occupations: Doctor, politician

Émile-Jules Dubois (28 December 1853 - 7 May 1904) was a French medical doctor and politician who was a deputy in the National Assembly from 1898 to 1904.

== Life ==
Émile-Jules Dubois was born on 28 December 1853 in Saint-Léonard-de-Noblat, Haute-Vienne. He became a school professor in the city of Paris, and then established himself in the 14th arrondissement of Paris as a doctor of medicine. At one time he was shot by a deranged patient. Later, during a diphtheria epidemic of 1890, he came close to death after treating children infected with the disease. Dubois was a municipal councilor from 1882. He became president of the general counsel of the Seine department, which covered Paris and the suburbs, from 3 April 1897 to 15 June 1898.

Dubois was elected deputy for the Seine, representing the second constituency of the 14th arrondissement, in the general legislative elections of 22 May 1898. He joined the Socialist Republican group. He was involved in many proposals for laws related to health, including prevention of contagious diseases such as tuberculosis, sanitary inspection of schools and isolation wards in hospitals. He belonged to various committees, including one for education and then one for public hygiene which he helped found in 1900, and of which he was president from 1901. At first, there were 33 members on the hygiene committee, mostly doctors but including three or four pharmacists.

Dubois was reelected to the same constituency in the general elections of 11 May 1902. His main platform in his campaign was improving hygiene in factories. He was a member of the army commission and again a member of the public hygiene committee. He continued to devote most of his activity to the promotion of hygiene and the fight against occupational diseases, and especially the fight against tuberculosis in the army. He died prematurely on 7 May 1904, in Paris, at the age of 50 years.

Dubois was a member of the Higher Commission of the Exposition Universelle (1900). He published numerous scientific and literary works. The Rue Émile-Dubois in the 14th arrondissement was named in his honor. The Lycée Technologique Émile Dubois at 14 Rue Émile Dubois is also named after him.
