= Émile Fernand-Dubois =

French sculptor

The Belgian born Émile Fernand-Dubois (1869–1952) was a sculptor, largely working in France.

Dubois exhibited on a regular basis especially at the Salon de la Société des Artistes Français. It seems that Dubois became an honorary curator of the Museum of Cosne-sur–Loire later in life and died at Villejuif in 1952, poor and forgotten.

== Marianne ==
He was well known for his bust of Marianne, the original of which can be found in the museum at Cosne-sur-Loire in the Nièvre region, which also holds many casts of his works. The Marianne bust was replicated many times and examples can be seen throughout France, normally in pride of place in the "mairie".

== Monument aux morts ==
Dubois worked on many monument aux morts (war memorials), such as those at Avion, Saint-Amand-en-Puisaye and Cosne-sur-Loire.

Work	Location	Subject, notes and references
Avion Monument aux morts	Avion Pas-de-Calais	Avion is an old coal mining town to the south of Lens at the junction of the N17, D40 and D55 roads. Dubois’ monument aux morts stands in the Place des Anciens Combattants. Avion was left in ruins after the war, being very much a "front-line" town and her monument aux morts is something of a rarity with the inscription "tu ne tueras point" (thou shalt not kill). The relief shows the Greek Goddess Damia recoiling in terror as she sees the clenched fists of executed criminals rising up from the ground. This was based on a story in Boccaccio's "Décameron". Originally the committee charged with approving the monument asked that text "tu ne tueras point" be excluded but it was included and the ruling was never invoked. There is a bronze maquette of this work in the Historial de la Grande Guerre in Péronne. Dubois's work unequivocally denounces war and killing and the text and theme has resulted, and not surprisingly so, in this monument being classified as pacifist.
Cosne-sur-Loire Monuments aux morts	Cosne-sur-Loire Nièvre	The monument was inaugurated on 14 October 1923 and features a relief by Dubois called "Sanglots sur les ruines". A model of this work was exhibited at the "Salon de la Société des Artistes Français » in 1921.
Saint-Amand en-Puisaye Monument aux morts	Saint-Amand en-Puisaye Nièvre	Another commune in the Nièvre and near to Cosne-sur-Loire.

=== Other monuments aux morts ===
Fernand-Dubois completed the Nièvre monument aux morts and those at Ciez, Perroy and Saint-Vérain.

== Other works ==
Work	Location	Subject, notes and references
"Rêve"	Paris	Several of Dubois’ statues were purchased by the state, including "Rêve" which can be seen in the Musée Galliera in Paris.
"Le Carrier"	Malakoff	Fernand-Dubois received an award for this work, which stands in Malakoff in the Seine district.
Statue of Général Jean-Baptiste Eblé (1757–1812)	Paris	The statue of Général Jean-Baptiste Eblé, one of many tributes to military men which adorn the Rohan pavilion on the Rivoli side of the Louvre in Paris, was a work by Fernand-Dubois.

== See also ==
- Émile Fernand-Dubois (French)
