= Charles Frédéric Dubois =

Belgian naturalist (1804–1867)

Charles Frédéric Dubois (28 May 1804 – 12 November 1867) was a Belgian naturalist.

He was the author of Planches colorées des oiseaux de l’Europe ("Color plates of the birds of Europe") and Catalogue systématique des Lépidoptères de la Belgique ("Systematic catalog of the Lepidoptera of Belgium"), which was completed by his son, Alphonse Joseph Charles Dubois (1839–1921), after his death.

The following quote has been widely attributed to Charles Dubois, as on the Favorite Quotes blog: "The important thing is this: to be able at any moment to sacrifice what we are for what we could become." However, its correct attribution appears to be to Charles Du Bos (1882-1939), the French critic of French and English literature.

The quote comes from his book Approximations (1922): "...premier tressaillement vital; surtout il s'agit à tout moment de sacrifier ce que nous sommes à ce que nous pouvons devenir."

Dubois is commemorated in the scientific name of a species of venomous sea snake, Aipysurus duboisii.
