= Émile Dubois (politician) =

French politician

- Born: 9 August 1913; Lille, France
- Died: 9 September 1973 (aged 60); Villeneuve-Loubet, France
- Occupation: Politician

Émile Dubois (1913–1973) was a French politician. He served as a member of the National Assembly from 1951 to 1955, representing Nord.
