= Marini =

Marini (last name) is a surname of Roman/Italian Catholic origin; closely associated with the last names: Marino and Mariani, with the three patronymic forms emerging from the same region at approximately the same time. Migrations branching from Italy ca.1600 gave rise to their modern forms as surnames. The Marinid dynasty was a Sunni Muslim dynasty of Zenata Berber descent that ruled Morocco from the 13th to the 15th century.

Notable people with the Marini surname include:

15–18th century

- Andrea Pasqualino Marini (1660–1712), Italian painter active in the Marche region, Italy
- Antoine Marini (15th-century) French theologian and political thinker, who contemplated the establishment of a European Court of Justice and a pan-European parliament
- Antonio Marini (1788–1861), Italian painter, mainly of sacred subjects for churches in Tuscany
- Biagio Marini (1594–1663), Italian composer; founder of the Tremolo (Italian: Bisbigliando) for string orchestra (Biago's violin sonatas contain the first ever tremolo notation found for instruments)
- Domenico de' Marini (died 1635), Roman Catholic Titular Patriarch of Jerusalem (1627–1635), and Archbishop of Genoa (1616–1635)
- Domenico de' Marini (1599-1669), Roman Catholic bishop
- Domenico de' Marini (died 1676), Roman Catholic Titular Archbishop of Teodosia
- Elias Marini, O.F.M. or Elias Marinich (died 1641), Roman Catholic Bishop of Sardica
- Francesco Maria Marini (fl. 1637), composer of early Baroque music
- Giambattista Marini or Giovanni Battista Marino (1569–1625), Italian poet; early pioneer of Marinism
- Giovanni Agostino De Marini (1572–1642) King of Corsica(city state) and 105th Doge of Genoa
- Giovanni Battista de Marinis (died 1669), Master of the Order of Preachers from 1650 until his death
- Girolamo Marini (Architekt) or Hieronimo Marini (died 1553) Baroque master stonemason and Italian renaissance architect; royal architect of Francis I (c.1535); notable contributions as an early pioneer of German (c.1545) defensive architecture/military engineering; brother of Camillo Mariani, early pioneer of modern French defensive architecture/military engineering (notably Verdun); and notable for his surviving sculpting works: sculptures by Mariani
- John Marini, American political scientist
- Leonardo Marini (1509–1573), theologian and Italian archbishop of the Dominican Order of the Catholic Church
- Luigi Gaetano Marini (archaeologist) (1742–1815) "The Restorer"; made cameriere d'onore of the pope and primus custos of the Vatican Library. Luigi's exact religious affiliation with the Catholic Church is uncertain. His notable scholarship includes the classification of five thousand inscriptions and Latin epigraphics
- Marco Marini (1542–1594), Italian orientalist and censor of Hebrew language publications for the Vatican.
- Paolo Marini (18th century), Italian painter
- Pietro Marini (1794–1863) Italian cardinal; notable for his coat of arms' conservative motto: Ne quid nimis. Pietro was entrusted with numerous prefectures and protectorships within Italy; appointed Governor of Rome, vice-Camerlengo of the Holy Roman Church and Director-General of the Police in his lifetime

19–20th century

- Adrián Marini (born 1972), Argentine football manager and former player
- Alberto Marini (born 1972), Italian screenwriter and producer based in Spain
- Alfredo Marini (1915-?), Italian professional football player
- Antonietta Marini-Rainieri (1815–1870), Italian operatic soprano
- Carlo Marini (born 1972), Canadian former international soccer player
- Catiuscia Marini (born 1967), Italian politician and manager, President of the Umbria region from 2010 to 2019
- Dante Marini (born 1992), American soccer player
- Enrico Marini (born 1969), Swiss/Italian comic artist
- Fiorenzo Marini (1914-1991), Italian fencer
- Francis L. Marini, Massachusetts politician and jurist
- Franco Marini (1933–2021) Italian senator, President of the Italian Senate (2006–2008)
- Gianpiero Marini (born 1951), Italian footballer
- Gilles Marini (born 1976), French/American actor and professional dancer
- Giovanna Marini (maiden name: Salviucci) (born 1937), Italian singer-songwriter
- Guido Marini (born 1965), Italian priest; Master of Pontifical Liturgical Celebrations
- Ignazio Marini (1811-1873), Italian operatic bass
- Jan Marini Alano (born 1978), actress from the Philippines
- John Marini, American political scientist
- Joseph Hector Marini (born 1957), Canadian retired ice hockey forward
- Louis "Lou" Marini, Jr. (born 1945), American blues/jazz composer and saxophonist of the original Saturday Night Live
- Luca Marini (born 1997), Italian motorcycle racer
- Luigi Gaetano Marini (1742–1815), Italian natural philosopher, jurist, historian, archaeologist and epigraphist
- Luigi Marini (singer) (1885–1942), Italian lyric tenor (opera)
- Mara Marini, Canadian actress
- Marilú Marini (born 1945), Argentine actress
- Marino Marini (bishop) (1804–1885), Roman Catholic titular bishop of Orvieto from 1865 to 1871, diplomat of the Holy See
- Marino Marini (musician) (1924–1997), Italian musician
- Marino Marini (sculptor) (1901–1980), Italian sculptor (see the Marino Marini Museum)
- Miguel Marini (born 1927), de facto Governor of Córdoba, Argentina
- Modesto Marini, Italian chef, restaurateur and founder of The Marini's Group
- Nicolas Marini (born 1993), Italian professional racing cyclist
- Niccolò Marini (1843–1923), Italian cardinal; recorded descendant of Pietro Marini. Notable for his liberal agenda and his work with Catholic Action in creating the Gaetana Agnesi women's club; Niccolo was exceptionally decorated with international honours and recognitions of merit in European knightly orders. His life's pursuit was to seek reconciliation of Eastern and Western Christianity, undertaking great labours and missions as secretary of the Congregation for the Oriental Churches
- Pablo Marini (born 1967), Argentine former football player and manager
- Philippe Marini (born 1950), French politician, former member of the Senate of France
- Piero Marini (born 1942), Italian archbishop; President of the Congregation for the Oriental Churches
- Pierre Marini Bodho (born 1938), Presiding Bishop of the Church of Christ in Congo
- Ruy Mauro Marini (1932–1997), Brazilian economist and sociologist
- Tomás Leandro Marini (1902-1984), Argentine ichthyologist
- Valeria Marini (born 1967), Italian model, actress, showgirl and fashion designer

21st century

- Francesco Saverio Marini (born 1973), Italian jurist
- Tommaso Marini (born 2000), Italian right-handed foil fencer

Fictional characters

- Enrico Marini, a member of the S.T.A.R.S. (Special Tactics And Rescue Service) in the survival horror video games series Resident Evil

== See also ==
- Marinism (a poet society of Marinists following Marinisimo)
- Marianismo (a Catholic society of Marianists following Marianism)
- Saint Marinus (Legendary founder of the society that became the independent Republic of San Marino)
- The History of San Marino and the Leges Statutae Republicae Sancti Marini (referring to the Constitution of San Marino created October 8, 1600).
- The Marinid or Mariní people (describing both ethnicity and the Marinid dynasty)
- Mariani (surname)
