= Piermatteo Lauro de' Manfredi da Amelia =

Italian painter

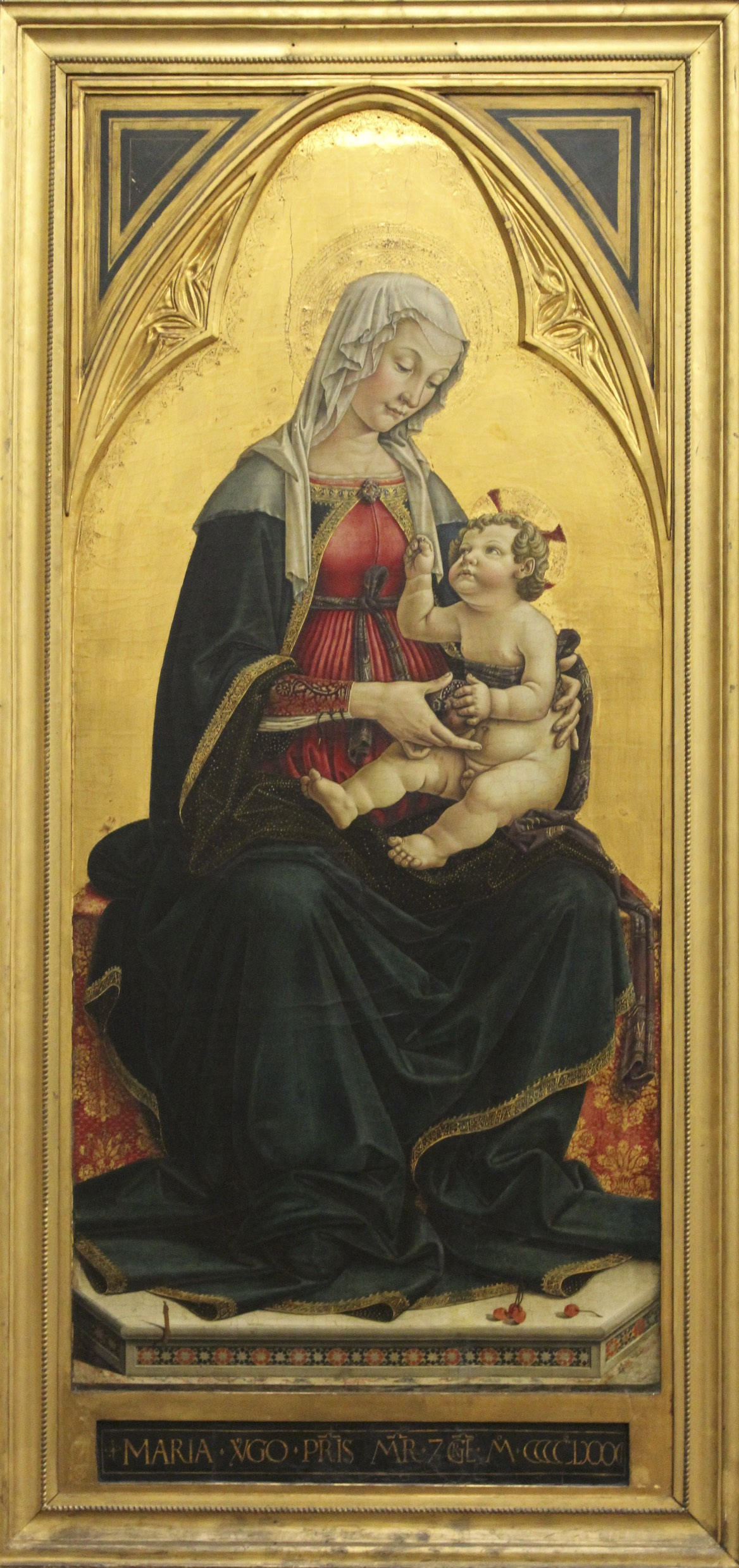
Madonna and Child (1481), Gemäldegalerie, Berlin

Piermatteo de' Manfredi da Amelia (circa 1445 - died 1503/1508) was an Italian painter of the Renaissance period.

== Biography ==
Piermatteo was born in Amelia, in Umbria.

He is first recorded as being part of the circle of Filippo Lippi, active between 1467 and 1469, working on the decoration of the Spoleto Cathedral. From 1479 until 1480 he was in Rome, where he was one of the painters working in the Sistine Chapel; he contributed to the decoration of the stars on the ceiling. From 1480 until 1482 he was active in Orvieto, painting statues and decorating church fixtures and clocks. It was at this time that he did some work for the church of Sant'Agostino; these pieces have since been removed and are scattered among a number of collections. He returned to Rome, but was recalled in 1482 by the Council of Works for the Orvieto Cathedral, and was commissioned to help decorate the San Brizio Chapel. Ultimately this work was later offered to Luca Signorelli. A fresco in Narni, depicting the Madonna and Child with Saints Lucy and Apollonia, has been dated to 1483. In 1485 Piermatteo was in Rome, working for Popes Innocent VIII and Alexander VI. Stylistically, his later works are similar to those of Antoniazzo Romano. In 1497 he was nominated to the conservatory in Fano; by 1503 he had been made superintendent of the Papal factories at Civita Castellana.

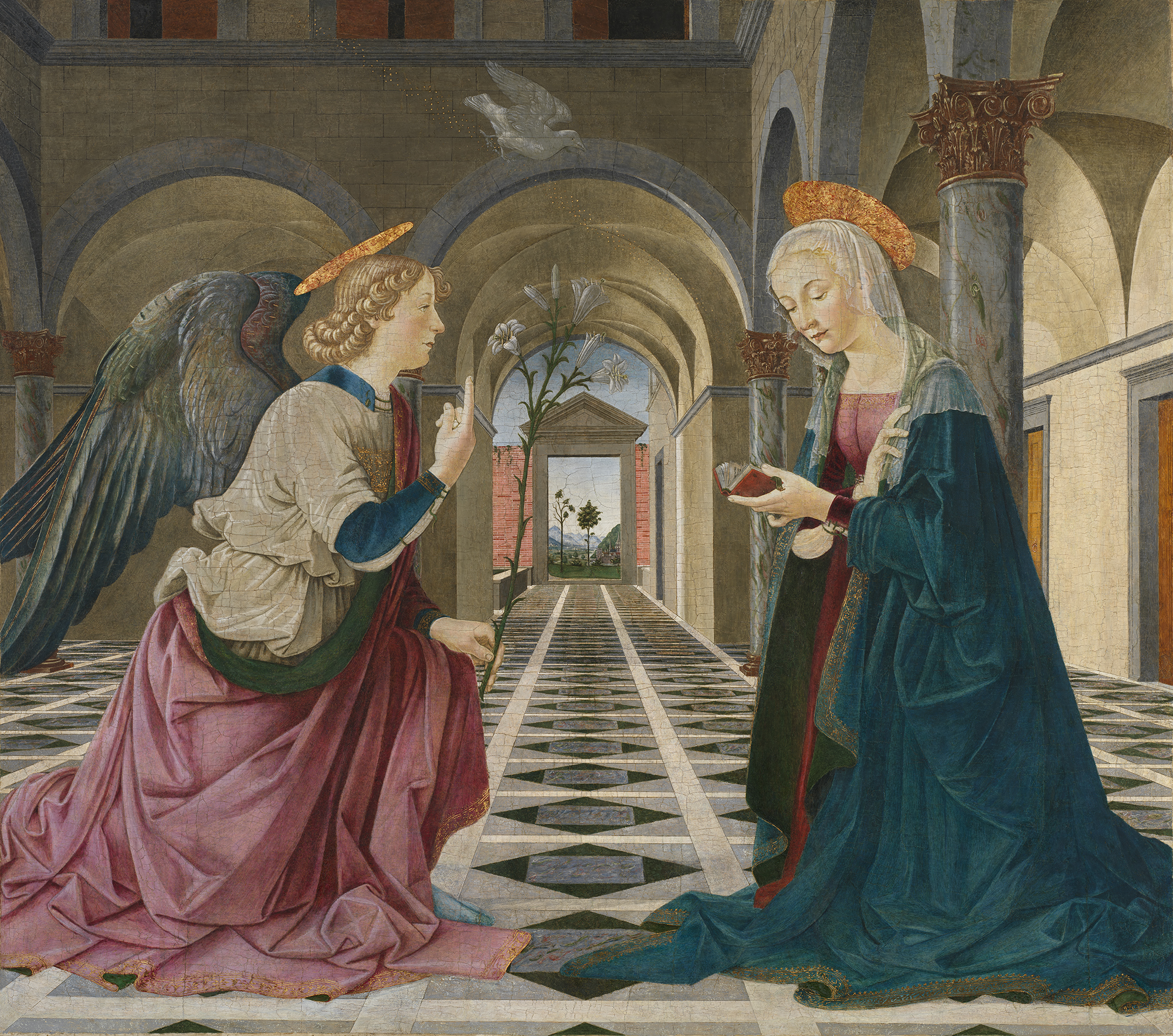
Gardner Annunciation by da Amelia, displayed at the Isabella Stewart Gardner Museum in Boston

Piermatteo is also known as the Master of the Gardner Annunciation for a series of works depicting the Annunciation which were painted for the convent of Santissima Annunziata in Amelia; in 1880 these came into the possession of Isabella Stewart Gardner, from whom the name comes. The anonymous painter was identified when the contract for the work was discovered in Terni; it indicated that Piermatteo da Amelia was contracted for the paintings on September 23, 1483.

A Mary Magdalen and a John the Baptist (circa 1480-1481) are displayed in the collections of the Lindenau museum in Altenburg.

== Sources ==
- Personaggi Storici from city of Amelia.
