= Marino Marini =

Marino Marini may refer to:

- Marino Marini (bishop) (1804–1885), Italian prelate
- Marino Marini (musician) (1924–1997), Italian musician
- Marino Marini (sculptor) (1901–1980), Italian sculptor
