= Antonio Veneziano =

Antonio Veneziano may refer to:

- Antonio Veneziano (poet) (1543–1593), Sicilian poet
- Antonio Veneziano (painter), Italian painter active late 14th century
