= Buon Gesù, Orvieto =

Italian church and monastery

Coordinates: 42.71581°N 12.10900°E

The Church and Monastery of Buon Gesù are adjacent buildings, still occupied by Clarissan nuns, with facades on Via Ghibellina between Piazza Clementini and Piazza Santa Clara in the southwest corner of Orvieto, region of Umbria, Italy. The gardens behind the monastery overlook the cliffs surrounding the town built on a rocky plateau. The Baroque architecture church is flanked to the north by Piazza Clementini. This remains an active convent of Franciscan order nuns.

== History and description ==
In 1559, the bishop of Orvieto and cardinal, Girolamo Simoncelli, had acquired this property for the monastery, and slowly over the years, Poor Clares were introduced into a monastery. It was decided to build, using an endowment from the merchant Muzio Cappelletti, a new church for the nuns which now stands as the Chiesa del Buon Gesù. This endowment also paid for the Jesuit Collegio Cappelletti founded next the church of Santi Apostoli in town. The first abbess was Suor Todeschina de' Massimi who came with 12 either postulants or novices. The monastery was consecrated by Cardinal Sannesio with the support of the Franciscan Cornelio da Bologna. Further endowment of the monastery and church came from one of its nuns, Suor Ippolita Simoncelli, almost certainly family of the cardinal Simoncelli of Orvieto, who died in 1661.

In 1633, under Cardinal Fausto Poli, the chapel of San Onofrio, which belonged to the Priorate of Santo Spirito in Sassia, was donated by Cardinal Ippolito Aldobrandini, Prior of church. The chapel, located behind the facade to the west of church, was incorporated into the monastery, and used by the nuns as a chapel.

This monastery as well as the nearby monastery of Santa Chiara were suppressed with the arrival of the Napoleonic armies. After the reinstitution of the Papal state, this monastery was restored, but Santa Chiara was not renewed.<key to umbria> There was a subsequent suppression of the monastery, but by 1901 they had re-acquired the property.

The richly decorated interior of the church of Buon Gesu had a choir section for the cloistered nuns to attend services. The church also received a donation in 1647 from Giovanni Battista Cecchetti, whose sister was a nun here; the money was used to decorate the apse, including frescoes, depicting events in the life of Jesus and Mary, attributed to Giovanni Maria Colombi. Also attributed to this painter are the altarpieces on the 3rd altars on the left and right, depicting respectively the Birth of the Virgin and the Profession by St Clare. The later canvas is attributed by Picolomini Adami to Cesare Nebbia, by other to Colombi. The painting had been looted from the Monastery of Santa Chiara during the Napoleonic occupation. It was taken to Paris in the Napoleonic era, when the nunneries of Orvieto were suppressed, but subsequently returned to the church of Buon Gesù, since Santa Chiara never reconsecrated.

The second altar to the right has a Jesus child adored by a kneeling St Francis, Clare, and Agnes painted by Vincenzo Pontani. The main altarpiece depicts a 15th-century Madonna and Child, peculiarly called the Morto vivo, which was once a wall fresco outside the Porta Maggiore of Orvieto. In 1572, Monsignor Timoteo Mucci, Vicar of Cardinal Simoncelli, gave orders to remove it and transfer it to this spot. Putatively this event healed the Cardinal from an illness. Construction of the church began in 1618, but the church was consecrated only by 1740 under bishop Marsciano.

A 1637 plaque to the right of the counterfacade inside recalls the endowment by Mutio Cappelletto (Muzio Cappelletti) and the execution of the will by city and church officers from the prominent aristocratic families Simoncelli, Gualterio, and Monaldeschi.
