= Diamond in the Dunes =

Documentary film

Diamond in the Dunes is a feature-length documentary produced by the Documentary Foundation about a Chinese-Muslim baseball team in Xinjiang Province, China.

== Film ==
The documentary tells the story of Parhat Ablat, a young Muslim from an ethnic minority in the deserts of Western China, who leads the fight against racial segregation through baseball.

The population of Xinjiang Province, China is divided between two ethnic groups: the indigenous Muslim Uyghurs and the ruling Han Chinese, who gained control of the region in 1755 from the Dzungar kingdom. Uyghur and Han speak different languages, practice different religions, live and work in different neighborhoods, and even set their watches two hours apart―Han operate on Beijing time, Uyghurs on unofficial local time.

There is one place, however, where the segregation line is broken: on the baseball field. Although Uyghur and Han Chinese students at Xinjiang University take separate classes and live in separate dormitories, there are not enough players of one or the other ethnicity to field a whole team. They need each other to play baseball.

Diamond in the Dunes follows this team and their charismatic captain, Parhat Ablat, in their struggle to overcome ethnic differences and prepare for their only game of the season: an all-in match up against a team of Tibetans from Qinghai Province.

The film is directed by Christopher Rufo. This is his third documentary film.

== Summary and background ==
Diamond in the Dunes opens with pastoral shots of Parhat Ablat, a young Muslim Uyghur, farming and herding sheep on his homestead outside Kashgar. Parhat says goodbye to his family and gets on the train for Urumqi, the capital of China's Xinjiang Province, where he attends university.

The population of this hardscrabble region is divided between two ethnic groups: the indigenous Muslim Uyghurs and the ruling Han Chinese, who gained control of the region in 1755 from the Dzungar kingdom. Uyghur and Chinese speak different languages, practice different religions, live and work in different neighborhoods, and even set their watches two hours apart―Chinese operate on Beijing time, Uyghurs on unofficial local time.

Parhat, pitcher and captain of Xinjiang University's baseball team, explains that classes and dormitories at Xinjiang University are segregated, but on baseball team, both Uyghur and Chinese students play side by side. When a package of donated baseball equipment arrives from the US, Parhat shares his excitement with Yusufu, one of his Chinese teammates.

During Xinjiang's brutal winter, the team begins to practice underground and racial tensions between Uyghur and Chinese come to a point. Parhat must bring both sides of the team together and remind them that if the conflict persists, the team may be disbanded by the university.

On and off the field, Parhat's goal is to raise poor Uyghur students out of what he calls the Uyghurs' 'spirit sickness.' He teaches quantum mechanics to a class of Uyghur physics students, counsels the younger players on the team, and starts a baseball team at the local elementary school.

At the end of the season, the Xinjiang University team is invited to compete against the next-closest baseball team, the Qinghai Tibetan College, more than 2,000 miles to the east. On the train, the novice players brush up on the strike zone and force out rule.

Finally, both teams face off for their only game of the season. The Xinjiang team plays hard, but Tibetans are too strong: the final score is 16–0. After the game, the mood is dour and the players look to Parhat for leadership. He assures them that the experience of defeat is important and a lesson can be learned: work hard, never forget your goals, and you will ultimately succeed.

The final sequence takes us back to Parhat's village. At sunset, he goes into the streets in his baseball uniform, finds a group of kids, and begins teaching them baseball. Night falls and the kids ask his name. "Parhat," he says, which in Uyghur means 'hero.'

Drawing from more than 100 hours of material, the film employs the cinéma vérité style, with no oncamera interviews or outside narration. The film favors a personal and psychological, rather than overtly political approach. The score is drawn from 100 minutes of Uyghur folk music, and includes drones extracted and reconditioned from the folk melodies and other sound design elements by Thomas Park of the musical act 'Mystified'.
