= Ferdinando Nuzzi =

Italian cardinal

- Cardinal, Bishop of Orvieto
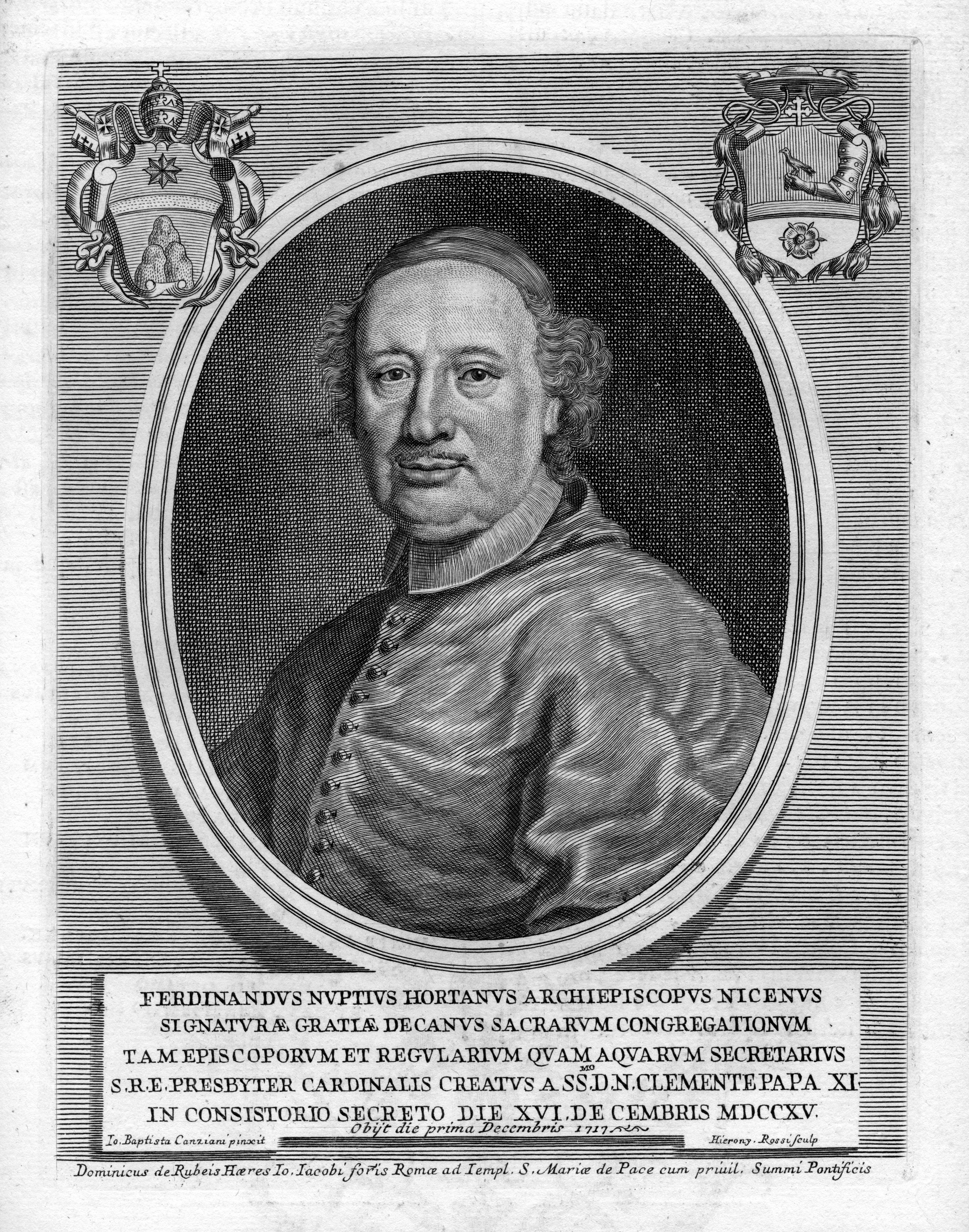
- Church: Catholic Church
- See: Orvieto
- Appointed: 30 March 1716
- Term ended: 1 December 1717
- Other post: Cardinal Priest of Santa Pudenziana

Orders
- Consecration: 13 June 1706 (Bishop) by Fabrizio Paolucci
- Created cardinal: 16 December 1715 by Pope Clement XI

Personal details
- Born: 10 September 1645 Orte
- Died: 1 December 1717 (aged 72) Orvieto
- Buried: Orvieto Cathedral

Ferdinando Nuzzi (1645 – 1717) was a Catholic cardinal who served as officer of the Papal States and as Bishop of Orvieto from 1716 to his death.

== Life ==
Ferdinando Nuzzi was born in Orte on 10 September 1645 to a family of Todi. At the age of ten, he moved to Rome, where he studied by the Jesuits in the Roman College. He graduated in utroque iure at Sapienza University of Rome.

Based in Rome, he took up a career in the administration of the Papal States, without standing out at the beginning also because his family was not noble. From 1688 for ten years, he worked at the Apostolic Camera (the central board of finance in the Papal States). After, he worked two years in the Holy Office and then he returned to the Apostolic Camera with the title of Cleric. From 1702 to 1706, he was made responsible of the Annona with the responsibility for the grain supply to the city of Rome: he distinguished himself for having built new granaries, having appointed architect Carlo Fontana of refurbishing and using as warehouses the Roman Baths of Diocletian.

In 1702, he published a booklet titled Discorso intorno alla coltivazione e popolazione della Campagna di Roma (discourse about the cultivations and the population in the Agro Romano), in which he cautiously supported the theory of Mercantilism, suggesting the abolition of privileges, the use of crop rotation and even the splitting up of estates.

In May 1706, he was finally appointed Secretary of the Congregation of Bishops. Leading the Congregation in charge of the appointments of new bishops, he was also appointed titular Archbishop of Nicaea on 7 June 1706. He was consecrated bishop the following 13 June by the Cardinal Secretary of State Fabrizio Paolucci in the Roman church of San Carlo ai Catinari. He maintained that office until 1716.

At the age of 71, on 16 December 1715, he was appointed Cardinal Priest of Santa Pudenziana, and shortly later, on 30 March 1716, he was appointed Bishop of Orvieto, allowing him to move to the province near where his family originated. He suddenly died in Orvieto on 1 December 1717 and was buried in that Cathedral.
