= Claremont Review of Books =

American magazine on politics and statesmanship

- Editor: Charles R. Kesler
- Managing Editor: John Kienker
- Senior Editor: William Voegeli
- Frequency: Quarterly
- Circulation: 14,000 (Note: approximate subscribers for year 2017)
- Publisher: Ryan Williams
- Founded: 2000 (26 years ago)
- Company: The Claremont Institute
- Country: United States
- Based in: Claremont, California
- Language: English
- Website: claremontreviewofbooks.com
- ISSN: 1554-0839
- OCLC: 184908708

The Claremont Review of Books (CRB) is a quarterly review of politics and statesmanship published by the conservative Claremont Institute. A typical issue consists of several book reviews and a selection of essays on topics of conservatism and political philosophy, history, and literature.

The editor is American political scientist Charles R. Kesler. The managing editor is John Kienker, and the senior editor, William Voegeli. Joseph Tartakovsky is a contributing editor. Contributors have included William F. Buckley Jr., Harry V. Jaffa, Mark Helprin (a columnist for the magazine), Victor Davis Hanson, Michael Anton, Diana Schaub, Gerard Alexander, David P. Goldman, Allen C. Guelzo, Joseph Epstein, Hadley P. Arkes, and John Marini.

== History ==
Legal scholar Ken Masugi was editor of the first iteration of the Claremont Review of Books which existed for just under two years in the mid-1980s. According to Jon Baskin, writing in the Chronicle of Higher Education, it "looked more like a college newspaper," and had about 600 subscribers.

The Review was re-established in 2000 under the editorship of Charles R. Kesler in what The New York Times described as "a conservative, if eclectic, answer to The New York Review of Books." In 2017 it had about 14,000 subscribers.

Authors who are regularly featured in the Review are sometimes nicknamed "Claremonsters."

== Political positions ==
According to historian George H. Nash, the editors and writers at Claremont are Straussian intellectually, heavily influenced by the ideas of Leo Strauss and his student Harry V. Jaffa. In their view, the Progressive Era culminating in the Presidency of Woodrow Wilson marked an ideological and political repudiation of political ideals of the Constitution and the American Founders, replacing a carefully limited government with government by experts and bureaucrats who were insulated from popular consent. They saw similar threats in the presidency of Barack Obama.

The Review took a pro-Trump position during the 2016 election campaign, with an article by Charles Kessler criticizing the Never Trump movement. "Conservatives care too much about the party and the country to wash our hands of this election," he wrote. "A third party bid would be quixotic.". Nevertheless, the Review published articles by both Trump supporters and "Never Trumpers" during the 2016 campaign, moving after his election to a thoroughly pro-Trump position. According to the New York Times, in the spring of 2017 the Review was "being hailed as the bible of highbrow Trumpism."

Jon Baskin understood the Review's pro-Trump stance as "an expression of the belief that conservative intellectuals can cut a path between the East Coast Straussians' political reticence and the ineffectual tinkering of the think tankers," but was at a loss to explain "how a group so attached to the principles of the Constitution could place its faith in the author of The Art of the Deal." According to senior editor William Voegeli, the reason lies in Kesler's scholarly examination of the origins of American progressivism. In a series of articles and in his book I Am the Change: Barack Obama and the Future of Liberalism, Kesler has argued that Woodrow Wilson and the first generations of American technocrats with PhDs earned at American universities produced the modern American "administrative state." To Kesler and the other Claremonsters, the administrative state has not only produced a series of costly and ineffective social programs, it has eroded democratic norms, substituting the shallow certainties of social science. In Baskin's phrasing, "one of the things that is most disturbing about Trump for liberal and conservative elites (including some East Coast Straussians)—his utter disdain for expertise and convention—is what is most promising about him from the point of view of the Claremonsters." As Voegeli put it, "Our view is that governments derive their just powers from the consent of the governed, whereas progressives are inclined to think that government derives just powers from the expertise of the experts."

During the George W. Bush administration, the Review "made a conservative case against the war in Iraq."

== Notable articles ==
Kesler's "Democracy and the Bush Doctrine" was reprinted in an anthology of conservative writings on the Iraq War, edited by Commentary Managing Editor Gary Rosen. The CRB was party to a high-profile exchange in Commentary between Editor-at-Large Norman Podhoretz and CRB editor Charles R. Kesler and CRB contributors and Claremont Institute senior fellows Mark Helprin and Angelo M. Codevilla over the Bush Administration’s conduct of the Iraq War.

In September 2016, two months before the US 2016 presidential election, the Review published an online-only article entitled "The Flight 93 Election." Written by Michael Anton under a pseudonym, the essay compared the election to choices that faced the passengers on Flight 93, one of the four hijacked planes used in the September 11th attacks. When the article was read by Rush Limbaugh on his radio show, the sudden surge in demand to read it crashed the CRB website. Addressing an audience of Republicans and Never-Trump conservatives, Anton argued that allowing the Democratic candidate Hillary Clinton to become president by abstaining from voting was the equivalent of not charging the cockpit.
