= Santa Maria Assunta di Castelnuovo, Recanati =

Roman Catholic church in Marche, Italy

Coordinates: 43°24′28″N 13°32′12″E

Santa Maria Assunta di Castelnuovo is a Roman Catholic church located on Via Angelo Giunta in the town limits of Recanati, province of Macerata, in the region of Marche, Italy. It is the oldest church structure in town.

== History ==
A church at the site was present by the mid-12th century, built initially in Romanesque-style and affiliated with a Benedictine monastery, derived and subsidiary to the Abbey of Fonte Avellana. By the 17th century, the church became property of the Bishop of Recanati.

The gabled facade was refurbished in the thirteenth century: into the facade are inserted two Gothic round rose windows, one semicircular lunette window, and a rounded stone portal decorated with a bas-relief of the Madonna Enthroned with Archangels Michael and Gabriel (1253) sculpted by Mastro Nicola Anconetano. The bell-tower at the rear of the church dates to the 12th century, and was found to have 15th-century fresco fragments inside that are attributed to Pietro da Recanati.

The Romanesque interior is subdivided into a nave and two lateral aisles by sturdy pilasters and rounded arches. The presbytery with the altar is separated by flanking arches from the nave, a separation common in churches belonging to cloistered orders. The stone cross, currently above the baptismal font, was formerly in the central rose window. A fresco depicting a Madonna and Child is attributed to Pietro di Domenico da Montepulciano. Among the paintings once in this church was a Transfiguration by Lorenzo Lotto and a polyptych by Guglielmo Veneziano, both housed by 12016 in the Pinacoteca of Villa Colloredo Mels. The church also once had an altarpiece depicting the Conversion of St Paul by Felice Damiani, and a Virgin and Child with St Catherine of Alexandria by Andrea Pasqualino Marini.
