= Charles R. Kesler =

American editor and author (born 1956)

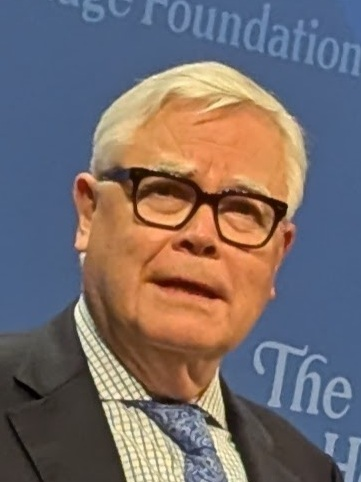
- Kesler in 2026
- Born: October 20, 1956 (age 70); West Virginia, U.S.
- Education: Harvard University (BA, PhD)
- Occupation: Academic
- Employer(s): Claremont McKenna College, Claremont Graduate University
- Known for: Editor of the Claremont Review of Books
- Spouse: Sally Pipes

Charles Reed Kesler (born 1956) is an American political scientist. He is a professor of government at Claremont McKenna College and Claremont Graduate University. He is editor of the Claremont Review of Books, and the author of several books. He also serves on the Board of Trustees at New College of Florida.

== Early life and education ==
Kesler was born and raised in West Virginia, where he served as a reporter for the Charleston Daily Mail, then the state's largest newspaper, and editor-in-chief of his high school newspaper. He graduated from Harvard University, where he earned a Bachelor of Arts degree in social studies in 1978, followed by a Ph.D in government in 1985.

== Career ==
Kesler is a professor of government at Claremont McKenna College and the graduate faculty at Claremont Graduate University. He is a senior fellow at the Claremont Institute, and teaches at their Publius Fellows Program, a summer institute for promising young conservatives. Additionally, he is the editor of the Claremont Review of Books, a quarterly conservative magazine. He was the director of Henry Salvatori Center at Claremont McKenna College from 1989 to 2008. In 2023, he was appointed by Ron DeSantis to the New College of Florida Board of Trustees.

Kesler was a member of the Trump administration's 18-member 1776 Commission, which released a report on 18 January 2021 (Martin Luther King, Jr. Day) that called for "patriotic education."

== Published works ==
- Saving the Revolution: The Federalist Papers and the American Founding (Free Press, 1987)
- Keeping the Tablets: Readings in American Conservatism (HarperCollins, 1988)
- The Federalist Papers (Signet Classics, 2003)
- I Am the Change: Barack Obama and the Crisis of Liberalism (Broadside, 2012)
- Crisis of the Two Constitutions: The Rise, Decline, and Recovery of American Greatness (Encounter Books, 2021)
