= Pietro di Domenico da Montepulciano =

Italian painter

Pietro di Domenico da Montepulciano (active 1418 - 1422) was an Italian painter active in the Marche region.

== Biography ==
He was like born in Montepulciano nelle Marche (apparently a neighborhood near Filottrano in the province of Ancona). Other sources attribute his birth to Recanati, where a presumed nephew, Domenico di Paolo da Recanati, was active circa 1434-1450. Some have postulated he is or is related to the Master of the Bambino Vispo. In style, he recalls Gentile da Fabriano or Jacobello del Fiore.

There are two signed works by the artist:

- Madonna dell'Umiltà (1420), now at Metropolitan Museum, New York
- Recanati Polyptych (1422), now at the Pinacoteca Civica of Recanati

A polyptych (1418) in the parish church of Osimo has been attributed to Pietro. Mazzalupi displays the increasing number of works attributed to the painter. Among works attributed to Pietro are:

- Coronation of the Virgin, Kress Collection, New York City
- Frescoes in the Chapel of San Nicolò (1418-1422) Osimo.
- Madonna and Child with Saints Dominic and Peter Martyr (1427-1428), San Marco, Osimo.
- Madonna della Misericordia, Musée du petit palais, Avignon.
- Madonna and Child, Santa Maria Assunta di Castelnuovo, Recanati
- Madonna del latte (Madonna of the Milk), Sant'Agnese, Montepulciano.
