= Gherardo Starnina =

Italian painter (c. 1360 – 1413)

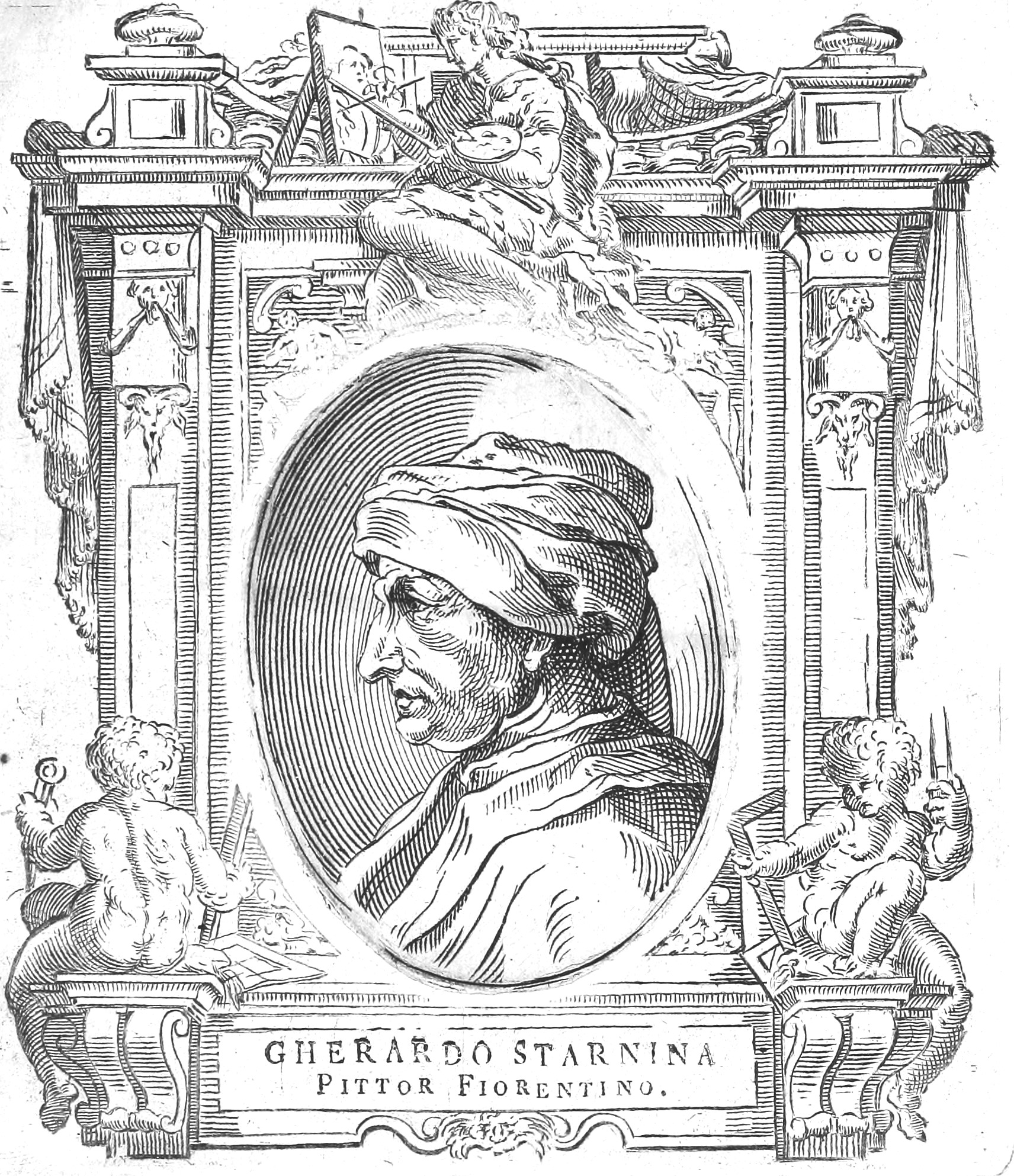
Gherardo Starnina

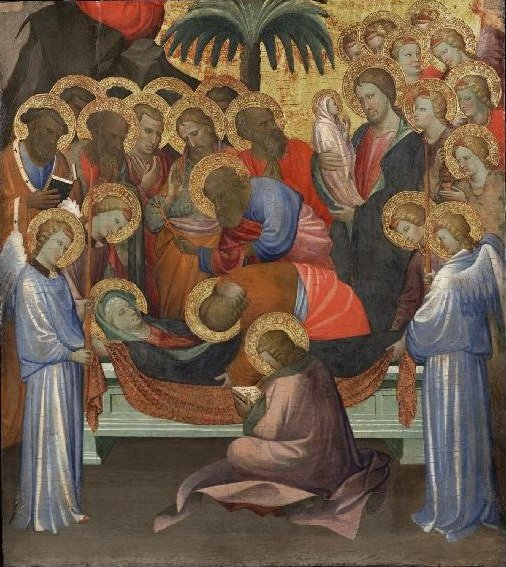
'Dormition of the Virgin' by Gherardo Starnina, c. 1404–1408, at the Philadelphia Museum of Art.

Gherardo Starnina (c. 1360 – 1413) was an Italian painter from Florence in the Quattrocento era.

According to the biographer Giorgio Vasari, Starnina initially trained with Antonio Veneziano, then with Agnolo Gaddi. He is claimed to have participated in the painting of the frescos in the Castellani Chapel in Basilica di Santa Croce, Florence. He is also said to have moved to Spain in 1380 to work under Juan I of Castile, and is attributed some painting in the San Blas chapel of the Cathedral of Toledo.

Several paintings formerly attributed to the Master of the Bambino Vispo are now attributed to Gherardo Starnina, and the two artists may have been the same person.

== See also ==
- List of Italian painters
