= Diocese of Orvieto-Todi =

Latin Catholic ecclesiastical jurisdiction in Italy

Diocese of Orvieto-Todi Dioecesis Urbevetana-Tudertina

Catholic
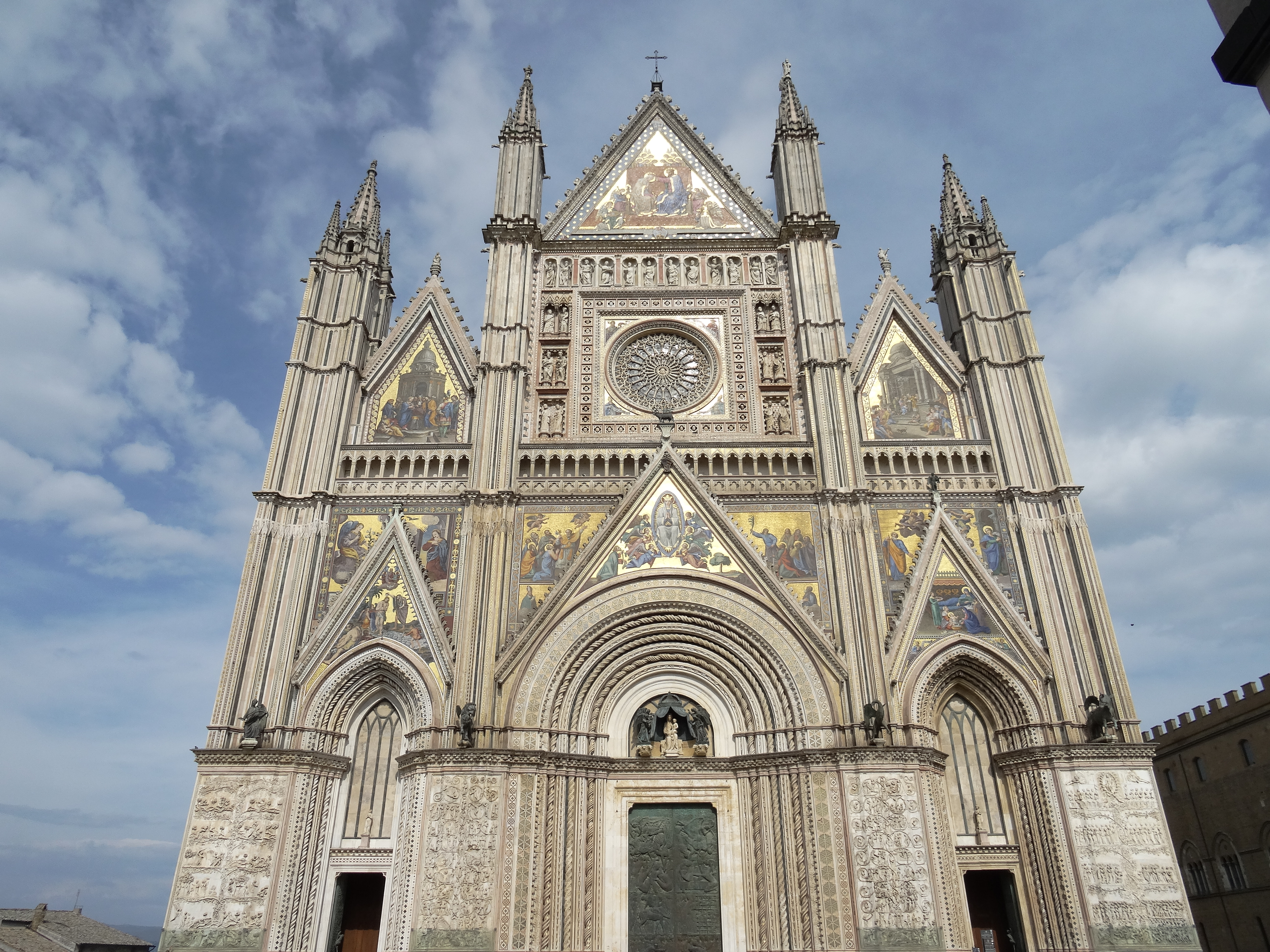
- Orvieto Cathedral

Location
- Country: Italy
- Ecclesiastical province: Immediately exempt to the Holy See

Statistics
- Area: 1,200 km^{2} (460 sq mi)
- Population: Total; Catholics: (as of 2016); 95,000 (est.); 90,000 (guess) (94.7%)
- Parishes: 92

Information
- Denomination: Catholic Church
- Sui iuris church: Latin Church
- Rite: Roman Rite
- Established: 6th century
- Cathedral: Basilica Cattedrale di S. Maria Assunta (Orvieto)
- Co-cathedral: Basilica Concattedrale di S. Maria Annunziata (Todi)
- Secular priests: 58 (diocesan); 49 (Religious Orders); 19 Permanent Deacons

Current leadership
- Pope: Leo XIV
- Bishop: Gualtiero Sigismondi
- Bishops emeritus: Giovanni Scanavino, Benedetto Tuzia

Map
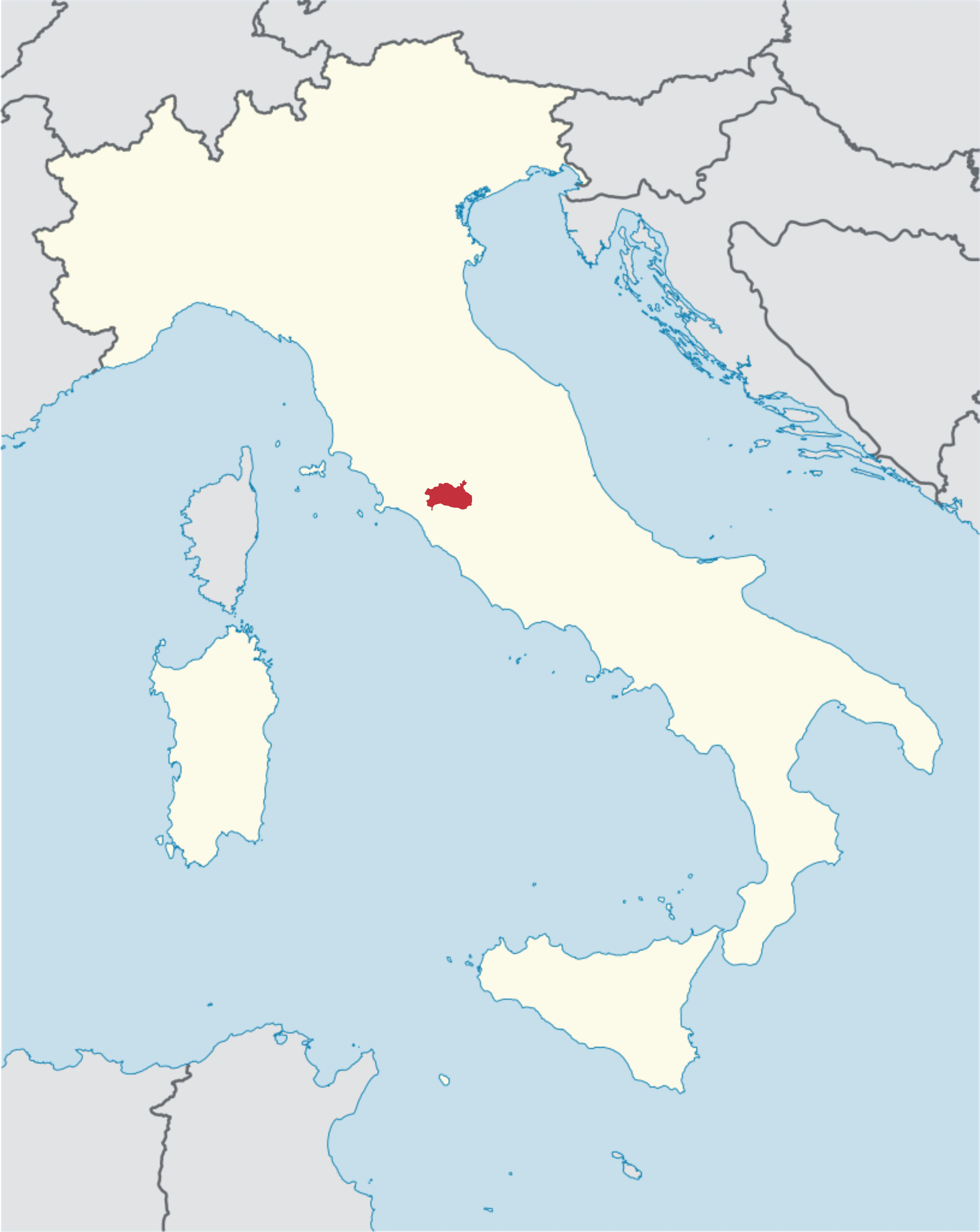

Website
- www.webdiocesi.chiesacattolica.it

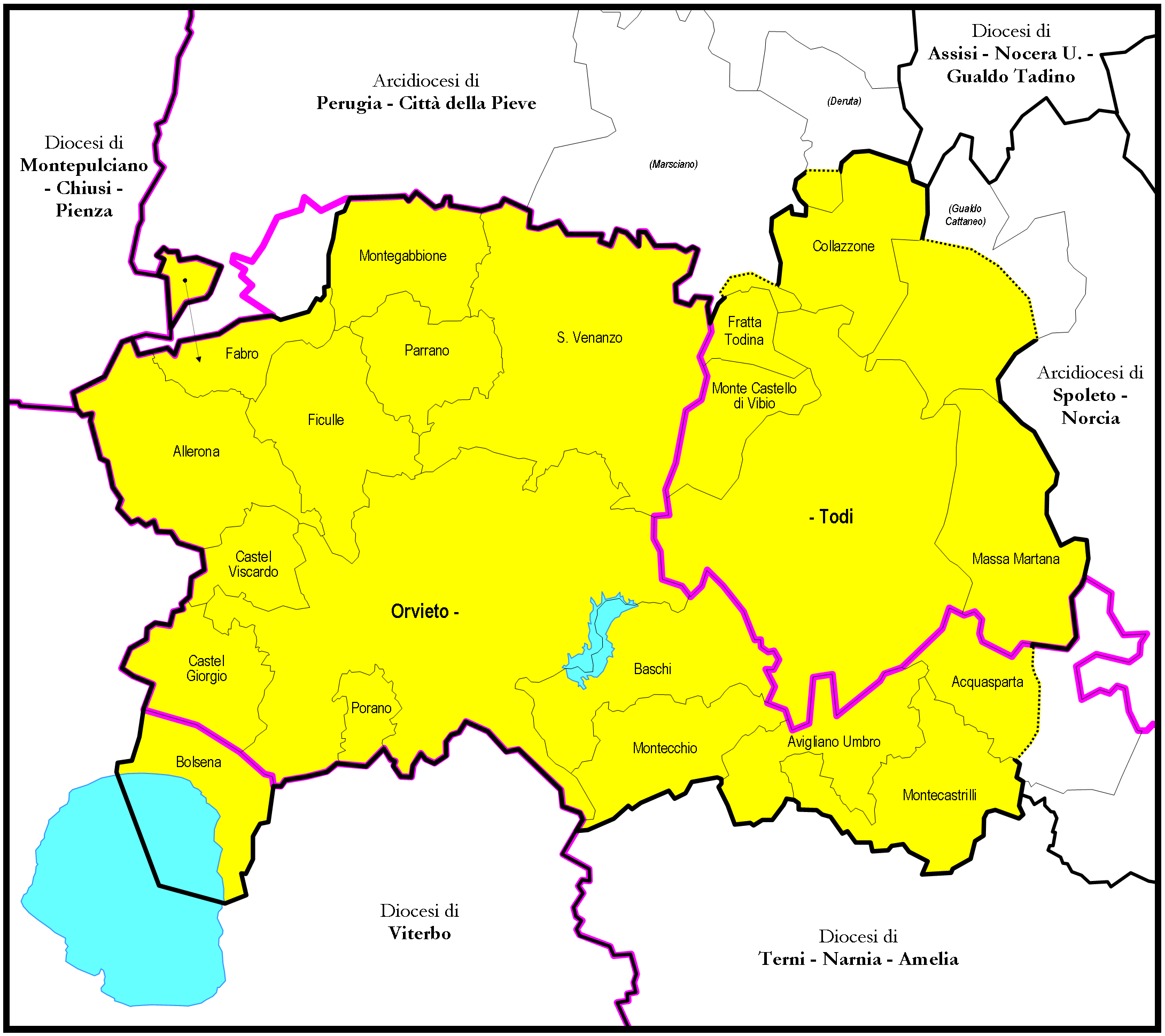
Subdivision of the diocese

The Diocese of Orvieto-Todi (Latin: Dioecesis Urbevetana-Tudertina) is a Latin Church ecclesiastical territory or diocese of the Catholic Church in central Italy. It was created in 1986 when the historical Diocese of Orvieto was united to the Diocese of Todi. The Diocese of Orvieto-Todi is immediately exempt to the Holy See and not part of any ecclesiastical province.

== History ==
During the Gothic War, Orvieto was defended by the Goths for a long time. Later, it fell into the hands of the Lombards (606). From the latter end of the tenth century the city was governed by consuls, who, however, took the oath of fealty to the bishop; but from 1201 it governed itself through a podestà (in that year, the Bishop Richard) and a captain of the people. On account of its position on the top of a volcanic outcrop, Orvieto was often chosen by the popes as a place of refuge, and Pope Adrian IV (1154–1159), who visited the city in September and October 1156, had it fortified.

The first known Bishop of Orvieto was John (about 590), and in 591 appears a Bishop Candidus; among its other prelates were Bishop Constantinus, O.P., sent by Pope Alexander IV in 1255 to Greece as his Legate, where he died in 1257;

In 1528 Pope Clement VII sought refuge at Orvieto, after the sack of Rome, and while there ordered the construction of the "Pozzo di San Patrizio" (the well of St. Patrick), by Antonio da Sangallo; it was completed in the reign of Pope Paul III (1534–1549).

Bishop Sebastiano Vanzi (1562–1570) participated in the 17th through 25th sessions of the Council of Trent (1562–1563) as one of the Definitori (legal draftsmen). In accordance with the decrees of the Council, he established the seminary of Orvieto as an institution; it was enlarged with a building of its own in 1645 by Cardinal Fausto Poli; later Giacomo Silvestri gave it the college and other property which was confiscated from the Jesuits (1773) when their religious order was suppressed.

The territory of Aquapendente was placed under the control of the diocese of Orvieto by Pope Paschal II in 1102.

=== Chapter and cathedral ===
Bishop Francesco Monaldeschi (1280) did much for the construction of the cathedral.

In 1695, the Chapter, which was the cathedral's administrative body, was composed of two dignities, the Archdeacon and the Provost, and sixteen Canons.

=== Diocesan synods ===
A diocesan synod was an irregularly held, but important, meeting of the bishop of a diocese and his clergy. Its purpose was (1) to proclaim generally the various decrees already issued by the bishop; (2) to discuss and ratify measures on which the bishop chose to consult with his clergy; (3) to publish statutes and decrees of the diocesan synod, of the provincial synod, and of the Holy See.

Cardinal Girolamo Simoncelli (1570–1605) presided over a diocesan synod in 1592.

Cardinal Pier Paolo Crescenzi (1621–1644) held a diocesan synod on 9 June 1627; another on 6 June 1639; and another on 19 May 1643. Cardinal Fausto Poli (1644–1653) held a synod on 21 May 1647. Bishop Giuseppe della Corgna, O.P. (1656–1676) presided over a diocesan synod held in Orvieto on 20—22 October 1666, and had the decrees published. Bishop Bernardino Rocci (1676–1680) held a synod on 16 May 1679.

Bishop Vincenzo degl'Atti (1696–1715) presided over a diocesan synod in 1713. Bishop Onofrio Elisei (1721–1733) held diocesan synods on: 9—11 May 1723; 24 April 1726; 27 April 1727; and 11 April 1728.

=== Reorganization of dioceses ===
In a decree of the Second Vatican Council, it was recommended that dioceses be reorganized to take into account modern developments. A project begun on orders from Pope John XXIII, and continued under his successors, was intended to reduce the number of dioceses in Italy and to rationalize their borders in terms of modern population changes and shortages of clergy. The change was made urgent because of changes made to the Concordat between the Italian State and the Holy See on 18 February 1984, and embodied in a law of 3 June 1985. The change was approved by Pope John Paul II in an audience of 27 September 1986, and by a decree of the Sacred Congregation of Bishops of the Papal Curia on 30 September 1986. The diocese of Todi was united to the diocese of Orvieto. Its name was to be Dioecesis Urbevetana-Tudertina. The seat of the diocese was to be in Orvieto. The former cathedral in Todi was to have the honorary title of co-cathedral, and its Chapter was to be called the Capitulum Concathedralis. There was to be only one episcopal curia, one seminary, one ecclesiastical tribunal; and all the clergy were to be incardinated in the diocese of Orvieto-Todi. The territory of the diocese was to be the same as the two dioceses combined.

== Bishops of Orvieto ==
=== to 1200 ===
...

- Joannes (attested 590)
- Candidus (attested 591, 596)

...

- Amantius (attested 743)

...

- Alipertus (attested 826)

...

- Heldericus (attested 1015)

...

- Sigefridus (attested 1027)

...

- Leo (attested 1036)

...

- Teuzo (attested 1054, 1059)

...

- Guilelmus (Wilhelm) (attested 1103–1126)

...

- Lanfranc (attested 1161)
- Milo (c. 1165–1167)

Sede vacante (7 years)

- Rusticus (1168–1172)
- Riccardus (attested 1179–1200)

=== from 1200 to 1500 ===
- Matthaeus Alberici (1201–1210)
- Joannes Capelli (attested 1211, 1212)
- Capitan(er)ius (1213–1227 ?)
- Rainerius (attested 1228, 1246)
- Constantinus (attested 1250, 1257)
- Jacobus Maltraga (attested 1258–1269)
- Aldobrandinus Cavalcanti, O.P. (attested 1272–1279)
- Franciscus Monaldeschi (1280–1295)
- Leonardus Mancini (1296–1302)
- Guittus de Nobilibus (1302–1328)
- Tramus, O.P. (1328–1345)
- Raymond de Chameyrac (1346–1348)
- Pontius de Péret (1348–1361)
- Joannes de Magnania (1361–1364)
- Pierre Bohier, O.S.B. (1364–1379)
- Nicolaus Marciari (1379–1389) (Roman Obedience)
- Nicolaus of Perugia (1389–1398) (Roman Obedience)
- Nicolaus, O.S.B. (1398-1399) (Roman Obedience)
- Matthaeus Avveducci, O.Min. (1399–1409)

Cardinal Corrado Caracciolo (1409–1411) Administrator
Monaldo de' Monaldeschi (1411–1418) Administrator

- Francesco de' Monaldeschi (1418–1443)
- Jacobus Benedicti (1443–1454)
- Giovanni Castiglione (de Polena) (1454–1456)
- Antonio Cabateri (1456–1457)
- Marco Marinoni (1457–1465)
- Giovanni Castiglione (1465–1476)
- Giorgio della Rovere (1476–1511)

=== from 1500 to 1800 ===
- Ercole Baglioni (1511–1519)
- Cardinal Niccolò Ridolfi (1520–1529 Resigned) Administrator
- Vincenzo Durante (1529–1545)
- Niccolò di Lorenzo Rodolfi (16 May 1548 – 1554 Died)
- Girolamo Simoncelli (25 Jun 1554 – 1562 Resigned)
- Sebastiano Vanzi (1562–1570)
- Girolamo Simoncelli ( 1570 –1605)
- Cardinal Giacomo Sannesio (1605 –1621)
- Cardinal Pier Paolo Crescenzi (1621–1644 Resigned)
- Cardinal Faustus Poli (1644–1653)

Sede vacante (1653–1656)

- Giuseppe della Corgna (Cornea), O.P. (1656–1676 Resigned)
- Bernardino Rocci (24 Feb 1676 – 2 Nov 1680 Died)
- Savo Millini (Savio Mellini) (22 Dec 1681 –1694)
- Giovanni Giuseppe Camuzzi (24 Jan 1695 – Sep 1695 Died)
- Vincentius degl'Atti (2 Jan 1696 – Nov 1715 Died)
- Ferdinando Nuzzi (30 Mar 1716 – 1 December 1717 Died)
- Onofrio Elisei (10 Sep 1721 – 27 November 1733 Died)
- Giuseppe di Marsciano (20 Jan 1734 – 2 July 1754 Died)
- Giacinto Silvestri (22 Jul 1754 – 12 April 1762 Died)
- Antonio Ripanti (14 Jun 1762 – 16 March 1780 Died)
- Cardinal Paolo Francesco Antamori (11 Dec 1780 – 4 December 1795 Died)

Sede vacante (1795–1800)

==== from 1800 to 2003 ====
- Cardinal Cesare Brancadoro (1800–1803)
- Giovanni Battista Lambruschini (1807–1825)
- Antonio Domenico Gamberini (19 Dec 1825 – 13 April 1833 Resigned)
- Antonio Francesco Orioli, O.F.M. Conv. (15 Apr 1833 – 18 December 1841 Resigned)
- Giuseppe Maria Vespignani (24 Jan 1842 – 2 February 1865 Died)
- Marino Marini (27 Mar 1865 – 15 October 1871 Resigned)
- Antonio Briganti (27 Oct 1871 – 2 October 1882 Resigned)
- Eusebio Magner, O.F.M. Cap. (25 Sep 1882 – 15 August 1884 Died)
- Giuseppe Ingami (10 Nov 1884 – 14 August 1889 Died)
- Domenico Bucchi-Accica (30 Dec 1889 – 7 January 1905 Died)
- Salvatore Fratocchi (24 Jan 1905 – 6 December 1941 Died)
- Francesco Pieri (6 Dec 1941 Succeeded – 15 May 1961 Died)
- Virginio Dondeo (22 Jul 1961 – 6 August 1974 Died)
- Decio Lucio Grandoni (12 Dec 1974 – 8 November 2003 Retired)

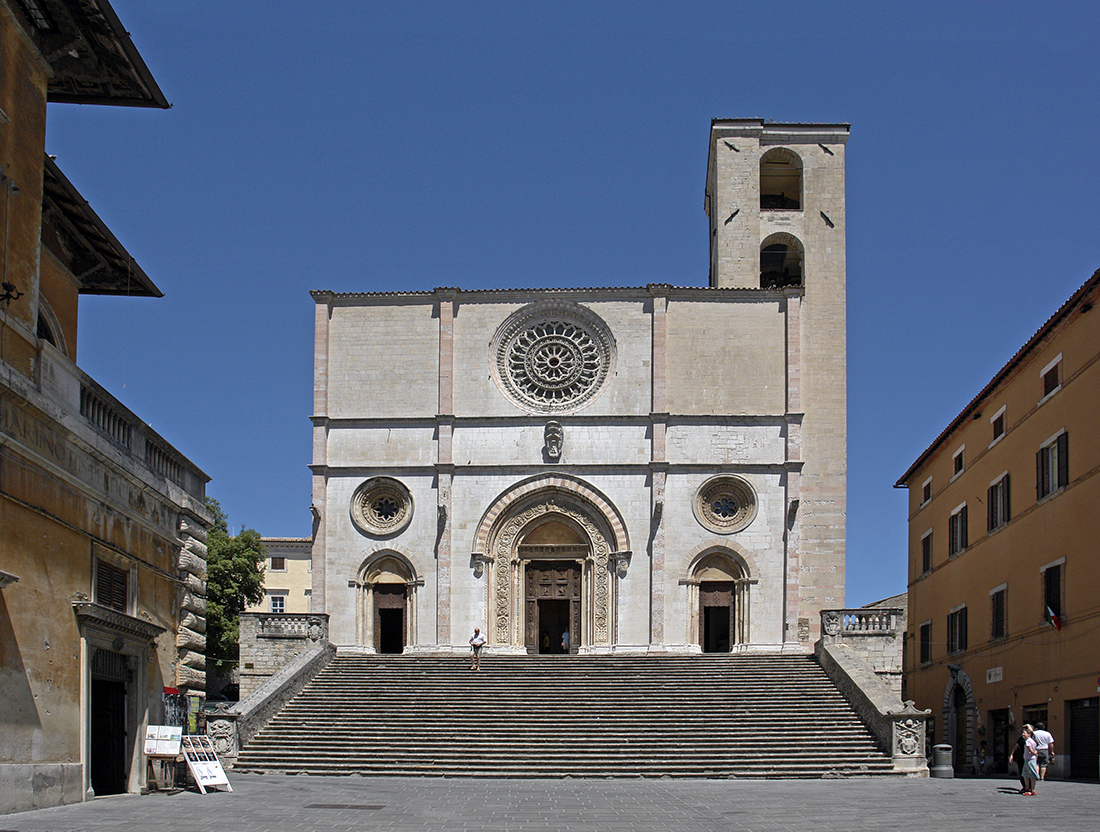
Co-Cathedral in Todi

=== Bishops of Orvieto-Todi ===
30 September 1986: United with the Diocese of Todi to form the Diocese of Orvieto-Todi

- Giovanni Scanavino, O.S.A. (8 November 2003 – 5 March 2011)
- Benedetto Tuzia (31 May 2012 – 7 March 2020)
- Gualtiero Sigismondi (7 March 2020 – present)

== Bibliography ==
=== Reference works ===
- Gams, Pius Bonifatius (1873). Series episcoporum Ecclesiae catholicae: quotquot innotuerunt a beato Petro apostolo. Ratisbon: Typis et Sumptibus Georgii Josephi Manz. pp. 711–712. (Use with caution; obsolete)
- Eubel, Conradus, ed. (1913). Hierarchia catholica. Vol. Tomus 1 (second ed.). Münster: Libreria Regensbergiana. p. . (in Latin)
- Eubel, Conradus, ed. (1914). Hierarchia catholica. Vol. Tomus 2 (second ed.). Münster: Libreria Regensbergiana. p. 152.
- Eubel, Conradus; Gulik, Guilelmus (1923). Hierarchia catholica, Tomus 3 (second ed.). Münster: Libreria Regensbergiana.
- Gauchat, Patritius (Patrice) (1935). Hierarchia catholica. Vol. IV (1592-1667). Münster: Libraria Regensbergiana.
- Ritzler, Remigius; Sefrin, Pirminus (1952). Hierarchia catholica medii et recentis aevi. Vol. V (1667-1730). Patavii: Messagero di S. Antonio.
- Ritzler, Remigius; Sefrin, Pirminus (1958). Hierarchia catholica medii et recentis aevi. Vol. VI (1730-1799). Patavii: Messagero di S. Antonio.

=== Studies ===
- Cappelletti, Giuseppe (1846). Le chiese d'Italia: dalla loro origine sino ai nostri giorni (in Italian). Vol. quinto (5). Venice: G. Antonelli. pp. 459–536.
- Fumi, Luigi (1884). Codice diplomatico della città d'Orvieto: documenti e regesti dal secolo XI al XV, e la Carta del popolo: codice statutario del comune di Orvieto (in Italian and Latin). Orvieto: Presso G. P. Vieusseux.
- Fumi, Luigi (1891). Il duomo di Orvieto e i suoi restauri: monografie storiche condotte sopra i documenti (in Italian). Roma: Società laziale tipografico-editrice.
- Fumi, Luigi (1891). Orvieto: note storiche e biografiche (in Italian). Citta di Castello: Tipografia dello Stabilimento S.Lapi.
- Kehr, Paul Fridolin (1907). Italia pontificia (in Latin). Vol. II: Latium. Berlin: Weidmann. pp. 221–230.
- Kehr, Paul Fridolin (1909). Italia pontificia Vol. IV (Berlin: Weidmann 1909), pp. 36–38. (in Latin)
- Lanzoni, Francesco (1927). Le diocesi d'Italia dalle origini al principio del secolo VII (an. 604). Faenza: F. Lega, pp. 361–362, 544–545. (in Italian)
- Marabottini, Filidio (1650). Catalogus episcoporum Vrbisueteris [Filidius Marabottinus F.] (in Latin). Orvieto.
- Schwartz, Gerhard (1907). Die Besetzung der Bistümer Reichsitaliens unter den sächsischen und salischen Kaisern: mit den Listen der Bischöfe, 951-1122. Leipzig: B.G. Teubner. pp. 259–260. (in German)
- Ughelli, Ferdinando; Coleti, Nicolò (1717). Italia sacra: sive De episcopis Italiae et insularum adjacentium (in Latin). Vol. Tomus primus. Venice: apud Sebastianum Coleti. pp. 1463–1480.
