= Girolamo Simoncelli =

Italian cardinal

- Cardinal-Bishop of Porto e Santa Rufina
- Church: Catholic Church
- Diocese: Suburbicarian Diocese of Porto e Santa Rufina
- In office: 16 June 1603 – 24 February 1605
- Predecessor: Girolamo Rusticucci
- Successor: Domenico Pinelli
- Other post: Bishop of Orvieto (1554-1562, 1573-1605)
- Previous posts: Cardinal-Bishop of Frascati (1600-1603); Cardinal-Bishop of Albano (1600); Cardinal-Priest of Santa Maria in Trastevere (1598-1600); Cardinal-Priest of Santa Prisca (1588-1598); Administrator of Orvieto (1570-1573); Cardinal-Deacon of Santi Cosma e Damiano (1554-1588)

Orders
- Ordination: 1573 by Fulvio Giulio della Corgna
- Consecration: 8 November 1573 by Fulvio Giulio della Corgna
- Created cardinal: 22 December 1553 by Pope Julius III

Personal details
- Born: 1522 Orvieto, Papal States
- Died: 24 February 1605 (aged 82–83) Rome, Papal States

Girolamo Simoncelli (1522, Orvieto – 24 February 1605, Rome) was an Italian cardinal.

== Life ==
Simoncelli was made a cardinal by his great-uncle, Pope Julius III, in the consistory of 22 December 1553. He was elected bishop of Orvieto in 1554 and administrator in 1570. He took part in the two conclaves in April and May 1555, those in 1559 and 1565–66, the two in September and October–December 1590, and those in 1591 and 1592. He was cardinal protopriest from 1598 onwards and vice-dean of the College of Cardinals from 1603.

The Prophecy of the Popes was possibly forged in order to support Simoncelli's bid for the papacy in the second conclave of 1590.

In 1559, the bishop of Orvieto and cardinal, Girolamo Simoncelli, had acquired property for the monastery Buon Gesù, Orvieto.

Records
Preceded by Lucio Sassi	Oldest living Member of the Sacred College; 29 February 1604 - 24 February 1605	Succeeded by Francesco Maria Tarugi
