= Master of the Bambino Vispo =

Italian painter

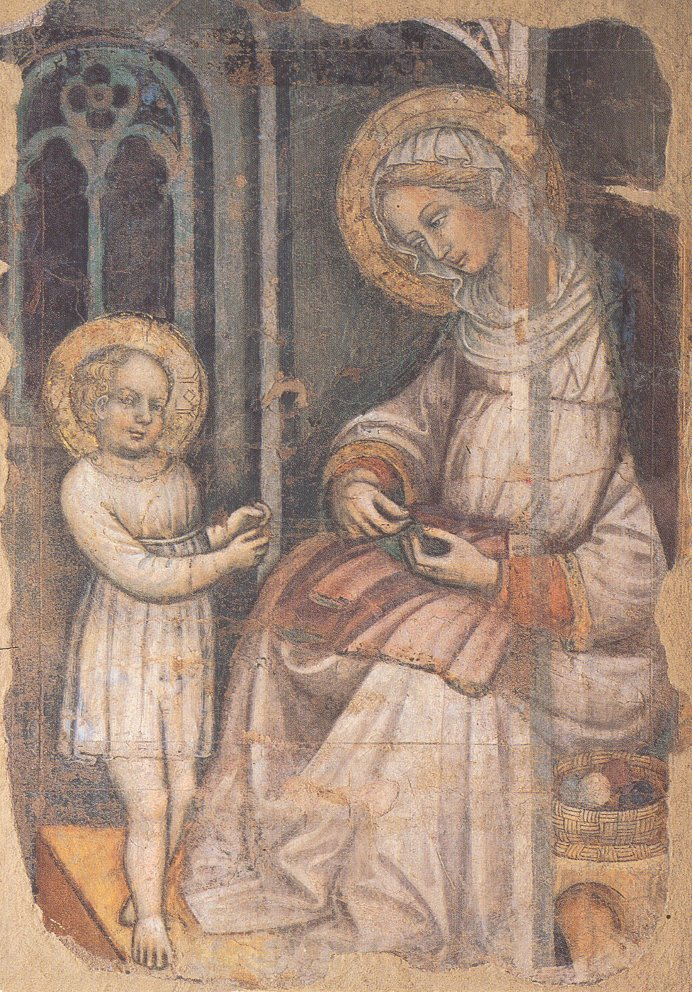
‘Saint Anne and the young Virgin sewing’, fresco by the Master of the Bambino Vispo, Museo dell'Opera di Santa Croce

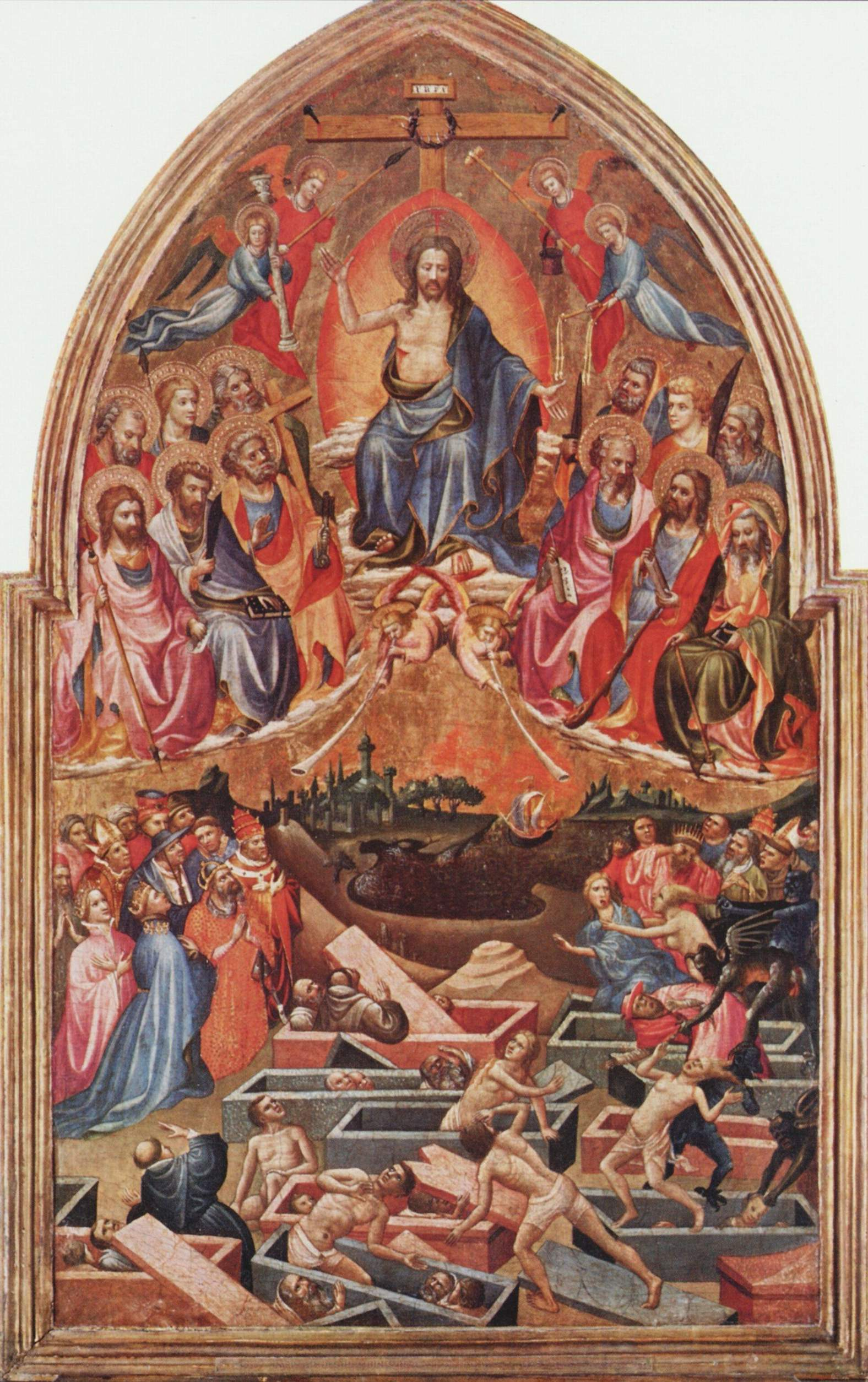
‘The Last Judgment’ by the Master of the Bambino Vispo, c. 1422, Alte Pinakothek

The Master of the Bambino Vispo was a central-Italian painter active in the early 15th century.

In the early 20th century, the art historian Osvald Sirén identified a group of unsigned paintings as being by the same artist. Sirén designated the artist as the Master of the Bambino Vispo (Master of the Lively Child) due to the unusually lively expression and movement of baby Jesus in these paintings. The paintings Sirén wrote about are:

- Virgin and Child with Saints and Angels in the Accademia di Belle Arti Firenze in Florence, Italy (probably by Mariotto di Nardo)
- Triptych of the Virgin and Child with Music-making Angels and Four Saints in the Galleria Doria Pamphili in Rome
- Virgin of Humility in the Philadelphia Museum of Art
- Mary Magdalene, St. Lawrence and a Cardinal Donor in the Bode Museum in Berlin.

Three painters, Pietro di Domenico da Montepulciano (active 1418–1422), Parri Spinelli (1387-ca. 1453), Miguel Alcanyis (active 1408–1447) and Gherardo Starnina (1354–1403), have each been credited with this body of paintings at one time or another. The preponderance of scholarly opinion currently favors Gherardo Starnina, who worked in Spain and then in Florence in the late 14th century.
