= Christopher Rufo =

American conservative activist (born 1984)

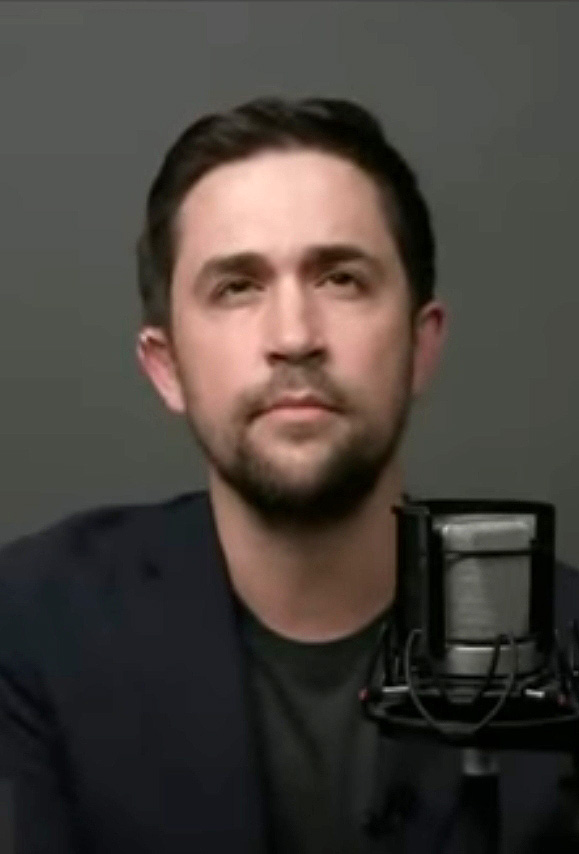
- Rufo in 2022
- Born: Christopher Ferguson Rufo; August 26, 1984 (age 42)
- Education: Georgetown University (BS); Harvard Extension School (ALM)
- Spouse: Suphatra Paravichai (m. 2016)
- Children: 3
- Website: Official website

Christopher Ferguson Rufo (born August 26, 1984) is an American conservative activist, New College of Florida board member, and senior fellow at the Manhattan Institute for Policy Research known for his opposition to critical race theory in institutions. Rufo is a former documentary filmmaker and former fellow at the Discovery Institute, the Claremont Institute, The Heritage Foundation, and the Foundation Against Intolerance and Racism.

Rufo has been involved in Republican efforts to restrict critical race theory instruction or seminars, which he says have "pervaded every aspect of the federal government" and pose "an existential threat to the United States". Rufo's appearances with Tucker Carlson on Fox News reportedly influenced President Donald Trump to issue an executive order in 2020 banning some topics from diversity training for the government and contractors; President Joe Biden rescinded the order in 2021. Rufo's rhetoric and work have been criticized by numerous sources.

Rufo is a contributing editor of the conservative policy magazine City Journal, and a distinguished fellow of Hillsdale College.

== Early life and education ==
Rufo was born on August 26, 1984. He was raised in Sacramento, California. His father was born in San Donato Val di Comino, Italy.

Rufo received a Bachelor of Science in Foreign Service from the Walsh School of Foreign Service at Georgetown University in 2006. He received a Master of Liberal Arts in the field of government from the Harvard Extension School in 2022.

== Career and activism ==
Rufo was a visiting fellow for domestic policy studies at The Heritage Foundation and a Lincoln Fellow at the Claremont Institute. Later, he was a research fellow at the Discovery Institute, a Christian think tank, where he was a director of its Center on Wealth, Poverty, & Morality.

Rufo was a documentary filmmaker in his twenties and early thirties, with various overseas projects such as Roughing It: Mongolia, and Diamond in the Dunes, a film about baseball in Xinjiang. As the founder of American Studio, "a nonprofit organization dedicated to creating new work about the American experience", he has directed four documentaries, including America Lost, which attempts to tell the story of "forgotten American cities". As a filmmaker he generally "focused on urban areas".

In 2017, Rufo was one of 30 plaintiffs in a lawsuit that successfully prevented Seattle from imposing a 2.25% income tax on sums above $250,000 a year for individuals and over $500,000 for couples. In 2018, he briefly ran for city council. In 2021, Rufo spoke at the National Conservatism Conference in Orlando. In April 2022, he was reported to have 2,500 paid subscribers to his newsletter. In 2022, the SPLC called Rufo a "far-right propagandist".

Rufo was one of several conservative education activists Florida Governor Ron DeSantis appointed to the board of trustees of New College of Florida in 2023.

In 2025, he won the Bradley Prize.

=== Critical race theory ===
Rufo's views on race and poverty became more conservative while directing America Lost, a 2019 documentary co-produced by PBS and WNET for the series "Chasing the Dream: Poverty and Opportunity in America". From 2016 to 2019, Rufo's investigation into poverty in cities that had declined dramatically following periods of prosperity—Youngstown, Ohio; Memphis, Tennessee; and Stockton, California—left him with the view that poverty stemmed from "social, familial, even psychological" dynamics and could not be solved by public policy. Rufo said that the 2016 United States presidential election challenged ineffective establishment responses to poverty and drew attention to these cities. In his 2018 Discovery Institute-funded policy paper "Seattle Under Siege: How Seattle's Homelessness Policy Perpetuates the Crisis and How We Can Fix It", Rufo wrote that four groups—"socialist intellectuals", "compassion brigades", the "homeless-industrial complex", and the "addiction evangelists"—had successfully framed the debate on homelessness and diverted funding to their projects, with the "compassion brigade" calling for social justice using terms such as "compassion, empathy, bias, inequality, root causes, systemic racism".

Rufo has opposed what he calls critical race theory in governmental and other publicly funded institutions, and has called it a kind of "cult indoctrination". In 2020, he said, "critical race theory has pervaded every institution in the federal government". Critical race theory involves the idea that racism is systemic, in that laws, policies, regulations, and even court decisions create and continue historical racial prejudices in the United States. Rufo has said he has intentionally used the term "critical race theory" for various race-related ideas to create unfavorable associations: "We will eventually turn [critical race theory] toxic, as we put all of the 'various cultural insanities' under that brand category. The goal is to have the public read something 'crazy' in the newspaper and immediately think 'critical race theory'." Rufo has called intersectionality "a hard left academic theory that reduces people to a network of racial, gender and sexual orientation identities and intersect in complex ways and determine whether you are an oppressor or oppressed". Kimberlé Crenshaw, an influential figure in critical race theory, has said that what Rufo and Republicans "are calling critical race theory is a whole range of things, most of which no one would sign on to, and many of the things in it are simply about racism".

Through interviews with Tucker Carlson on Fox News, Rufo reportedly influenced the Trump administration to issue an executive order in 2020 to prohibit federal agencies from having diversity training that addressed topics such as systemic racism, white privilege, and critical race theory. The administration called such programs "divisive, anti-American propaganda". President Joe Biden rescinded the ban on his first day in office. Divisions continued at the state level, with Republican legislators putting forward bans on critical race theory. Rufo has repeatedly appeared on Tucker Carlson Tonight and The Ingraham Angle. According to New Yorker writer Benjamin Wallace-Wells, Rufo's story on racially divided bias-training sessions in Seattle "helped to generate more leaks from across the country" about the contents of courses and diversity training programs.

According to The Washington Post, Snopes, and New York, Rufo has misrepresented contents of diversity training programs and course curricula. For example, he falsely claimed that a diversity consultant the U.S. Treasury Department hired had "told employees essentially that America was a fundamentally white supremacist country" and urged them to "accept their white racial superiority"; the diversity consultant had said no such thing. Rufo told Fox News that The Washington Post subsequently issued multiple corrections to its reporting on him, including retracting a statement that a Cupertino, California, diversity seminar Rufo mentioned did not occur. The Post wrote, "This report has been changed to clarify the sequence of events that followed Rufo's appearance on Fox News last summer. In addition, the story adds a clarification from the Cupertino superintendent that a lesson was presented once before it was canceled." New York magazine has also alleged that Rufo misrepresented the contents of internal documents from the Tigard-Tualatin School District in Oregon, which referenced Paulo Freire's Pedagogy of the Oppressed. In Rufo's view, the documents incite revolutionary sentiments and assume that white people are born racist, which he called "textbook cult indoctrination". The school district said the documents had not been used in formal settings, that Rufo had misquoted the references to Freire, and that he had misconstrued a reference to teachers moving beyond the "belief that you aren't racist if you don't purposely or consciously act in racist ways".

=== LGBTQ issues and schools ===
Rufo has been a prominent advocate for bans on teachers discussing LGBTQ issues in classrooms. He supported Florida House Bill 1557 (The Florida Parental Rights in Education Act, commonly known as the "Don't Say Gay" bill), which prohibits teachers from discussing such matters in kindergarten through the third grade. Rufo appeared alongside Florida Governor Ron DeSantis when he signed a bill retaliating against Disney after the company criticized the Florida Parental Rights in Education Act.

Rufo linked LGBTQ discussions at schools to grooming, the act of connecting with children for the purpose of sexually abusing them. He said that schools were "hunting grounds" for sexually predatory teachers and that parents had "good reason" to worry about grooming. Citing a study by Charol Shakeshaft, Rufo claimed that public school teachers are responsible for 100 times more child sexual abuse than Catholic priests. Shakeshaft said this was a misuse of her data, calling it "completely invalid". After Disney criticized the Florida Parental Rights in Education Act, Rufo suggested that Disney was involved in sexualizing children and rife with child sexual abuse.

According to New York Times writer Trip Gabriel, "critics of Mr. Rufo, and of the broader right-wing push on LGBTQ issues, say the attacks represent a new era of moral panic, one with echoes of slanders from decades ago that gay teachers were a threat to children." For Salon, education journalist and political science lecturer Kathryn Joyce has written that Rufo's claims about public school teachers and pedophilia are part of his goal to "generally foster so much anger against public schools that it drives a nationwide popular movement to privatize education". American Federation of Teachers president Randi Weingarten has said that Rufo and others who wish to privatize "public education are using Big Lies to undermine public schools." Rufo has said, "To get to universal school choice, you really need to operate from a premise of universal public school distrust."

Rufo opposes "socio-emotional learning", saying it "serves as a delivery mechanism for radical pedagogies such as critical race theory and gender deconstructionism." Socio-emotional learning, which promotes self-awareness, self-management, responsible decision-making, social awareness and relationship building, was a fairly uncontroversial pedagogical technique before being criticized by Republicans and Rufo.

=== Claudine Gay campaign ===
In December 2023, Rufo and co-author Christopher Brunet investigated the past research of Harvard University president Claudine Gay, who had recently attracted controversy for her handling of antisemitism at the university and her defense of Harvard's handling of the situation at a congressional hearing. Rufo and Brunet alleged that many of her articles, including her dissertation, were plagiarized. After further investigation of the plagiarism allegations in mainstream media outlets, Gay announced her resignation on January 2, 2024. In an interview with Politico, Rufo said that Gay's resignation "was the result of a coordinated and highly organized conservative campaign".

=== Hoax reward offered ===
In September 2024, during an incident related to the Springfield, Ohio, cat-eating hoax, Rufo alleged that Haitian migrants were eating cats in Dayton, Ohio, based on an August 2023 video of skinned animals being grilled, which drew social media responses that the skinned animals resembled chickens. Dayton police responded that "there is no evidence to even remotely suggest that any group, including our immigrant community, is engaged in eating pets", while the Dayton mayor reported "absolutely zero reports of this type of activity". Rufo has offered a $5,000 reward for proof supporting the unsubstantiated allegation.

=== "Indian Question" ===
In response to a post by Bo French condemning the number of Indian American spectators at a Texas Longhorns football game, Rufo hosted a podcast episode entitled "The Indian Question," during which he suggested that binge drinking and low academic standards are important to American youth culture and that Indian Americans had disrespected this with their pursuit of academic excellence. This podcast became the subject of media attention.

== Personal life ==
Rufo is married to Suphatra "Kip" Paravichai, a Thai American. She was once a computer programmer at Amazon Web Services. As of 2021, they live in Gig Harbor, Washington, with their three sons. He is Catholic.

== Books ==
- Rufo, Christopher F. (2023). America's Cultural Revolution: How the Radical Left Conquered Everything. New York, NY: Broadside Books. ISBN 978-0063227538.
- Jackson, Kerry; Rufo, Christopher F.; Tartakovsky, Joseph; Winegarden, Wayne (2021). No Way Home: The Crisis of Homelessness and How to Fix It with Intelligence and Humanity (First American ed.). New York London: Encounter Books. ISBN 9781641771641.
