= Sant'Agostino, Orvieto =

Religious building in Orvieto, Italy

Coordinates: 42.71996°N 12.10412°E

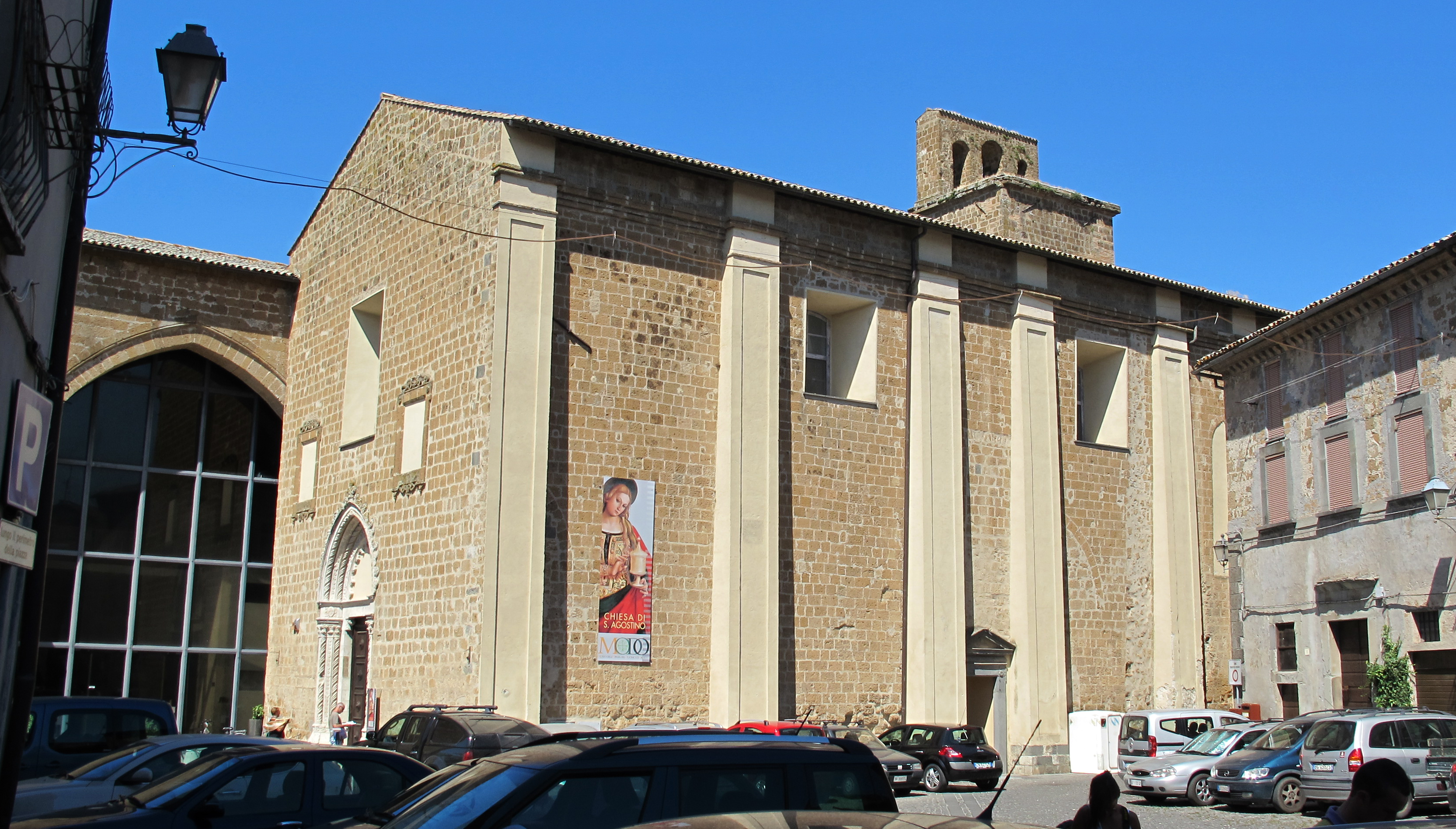
Facade and flank of the former church of Sant'Agostino

Sant'Agostino is a Gothic architecture, deconsecrated Roman Catholic church located on Piazza Giovenale #7 in the northwestern corner of Orvieto, region of Umbria, Italy. This building, as well as the church of Santi Apostoli, now serves as a display hall for MODO (Museum of the Opera del Duomo of Orvieto).

== History and description ==
Monks of the Augustinian order had been introduced into Orvieto by about 1156, and soon after they had entered in possession of the convent and church of Santa Lucia at this site, belonging to the Premonstratensian order. This church was razed to erect a larger one, and in 1264 Cardinal Ancherio Pantaleone, nephew of Pope Urban IV consecrated the first stone. The well-preserved ogival portal of the church was completed in the 13th century. The church remained incomplete until 1724. The monastery here had various transitions, and by 1462 had dwindled to three monks, leading to its suppression by pope Pius II Piccolomini. Construction continued on the church and monastery. In the 19th-century, the monastery was converted into barracks; the church was suppressed in the 19th-century.
