= Luigi Gaetano Marini =

Luigi Gaetano Marini (18 December 1742 – 7 May 1815) was an Italian natural philosopher, jurist, historian, archaeologist and epigraphist.

== Biography ==
Marini was born in Sant'Arcangelo (pagus Acerbotanus). Having received a comprehensive preparatory education at the College of San Marino and at the seminary at Rimini, he passed through the legal and philological studies at Bologna University brilliantly and graduated at Ravenna in utroque jure (in both canon and civil law). He went to Rome in December 1764, where he gained the friendship of Cardinal Alessandro Albani and Giuseppe Garampi. He entered into relations with the most distinguished scholars of his day and maintained an extensive correspondence with them. In 1772, he was appointed coadjutor to Marino Zampini, prefect of the archives, and the Roman Republic gave him the position of prefect of the archives at the Vatican and the Castel Sant'Angelo, as well as that of president of the Vatican Museum and the Vatican Library. On 18 August 1800, Pius VII made him primus custos of the Vatican Library and also prefect of the archives. In January 1805, he was made a cameriere d'onore to the pope. He died in May 1815.

When the archives of the Roman Curia were seized and transferred to Paris by Napoleon, he accompanied them, reaching Paris on 11 April 1810. After Napoleon's fall, the Count of Artois, vice-regent and brother of the king, issued a decree on 9 April 1814 directing the restitution of the archives, of all documents and Manuscripts, and of several other collections to the Holy See. On 28 April, the papal commissioners, de Gregorio, Gaetano Marini, and his nephew Marino Marini, took charge of the whole of this property, but before they reached Rome, Gaetano Marini, who had long been an invalid, died in Paris on 7 May 1815.

== Scholarship ==
Marini was a master of Latin, Greek, and Hebrew, possessed great legal knowledge, and took up questions of natural philosophy. His great work on papyrus records is a standard work on the investigation of papyri. His book on the Arval Brethren of ancient Rome brought to light so much that was new, and its appearance created a stir. His classification of five thousand inscriptions, both Christian and heathen, in the Galleria Lapidaria at the Vatican, earned for him the honorary title of "Restorer" of Latin epigraphy. Marini was a cleric, but not a priest. He often prayed for hours before the Blessed Sacrament, and went to communion three times a week. During his residence in Paris and living as an invalid, he gave away alms to the extent of 3000 scudi, a significant sum at the time and for his situation.

== Works ==
Principal works:

- Degli Archiatri Pontifici, 1784: vol. 1, vol. 2
- Gli atti e monumenti de' fratelli Arvali, 1795.
- Iscrizioni antiche doliari (written between 1798 and 1799, published in 1884 by Giovanni Battista de Rossi)
- I papiri diplomatici, 1805.
- Memorie istoriche degli Archivi... (posthumous)

== Notes and References ==
Attribution

- Cites sources:
  - MARINO MARINI. Degli. Aneddoti di Gaetano Marini: Commentario di suo nipote (Rome, 1822);
  - MORONI, Dizionarzo di Erudizione Storico-Ecclesiatica, IV, 286;
  - MARINO MARINI, Memorie Storiche dell' occupazione e restitutione degli Archivii della S. Sede e del riacquisto de' Codici e Museo Numismatico del Vaticano e de' Manoscritti e parte del Museo di Storia Naturale di Bologna (Rome, 1885)
