= John Marini =

American political scientist

- Education: University of California, Davis
- Occupation: Political scientist
- Employer: University of Nevada, Reno

John Marini is an American political scientist. He is a Professor of Political Science at the University of Nevada, Reno, and a senior fellow at the Claremont Institute. He is the author of two books about the administrative state and the co-editor of two more books.

== Early life ==
John Marini earned a PhD from the University of California, Davis.

== Career ==
Marini taught Political Science at the University of Dallas and Ohio University. He is now a full professor at the University of Nevada, Reno. He is also a senior fellow at the Claremont Institute, a conservative think tank.

Marini is the editor of two books about the United States Congress, and the author of two more books about the American administrative state. In The Politics Of Budget Control: Congress, The Presidency And Growth Of The Administrative State, he argues that the growth of governmental bureaucracy is unlimited due to the absence of budgetary restraints, and that it is unconstitutional because it arrogates all powers. He adds that Congress is the main focus of the administrative state. In a review for the Journal of Political Analysis and Management, William A. Niskanen of the Cato Institute suggested it was "an elegant, profound, and disturbing book", but he regretted the lack of quantitative data or public choice theory in Marini's analysis. In Unmasking the Administrative State: The Crisis of American Politics in the Twenty-First Century, Marini writes about the growth of the administrative state at the expense of the Constitution over the course of the twentieth century, with the challenges it raises and the theoretical tools that could curtail it. For Marini, the administrative state is antithetical to America's populist tradition of self-government.

In an essay for the Claremont Review of Books published in July 2016 and entitled Donald Trump and the American Crisis, Marini suggested then-presidential candidate Donald Trump should be commended for his recognition that neither the Democratic Party nor the Republican Party represented the American people anymore.

== Works ==
- Jones, Gordon S.; Marini, John, eds. (1989). The Imperial Congress: Crisis in the Separation of Powers. New York: World Almanac.
- Marini, John (1992). The Politics Of Budget Control: Congress, The Presidency And Growth Of The Administrative State. Taylor & Francis.
- Marini, John; Masugi, Ken, eds. (2005). The Progressive Revolution in Politics and Political Science: Transforming the American Regime. Lanham, Maryland: Rowman & Littlefield. ISBN 9780742549739. OCLC 232005427.
- Marini, John (2019). Masugi, Ken (ed.). Unmasking the Administrative State: The Crisis of American Politics in the Twenty-First Century. New York City: Encounter Books. ISBN 9781641770231. OCLC 1048658113.
