= Antonio Veneziano (painter) =

Italian painter

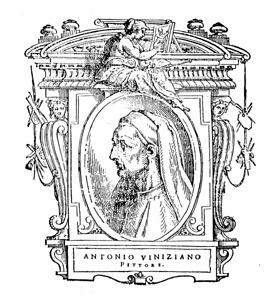
Illustration of Antonio Veneziano from "Le Vite" by Giorgio Vasari

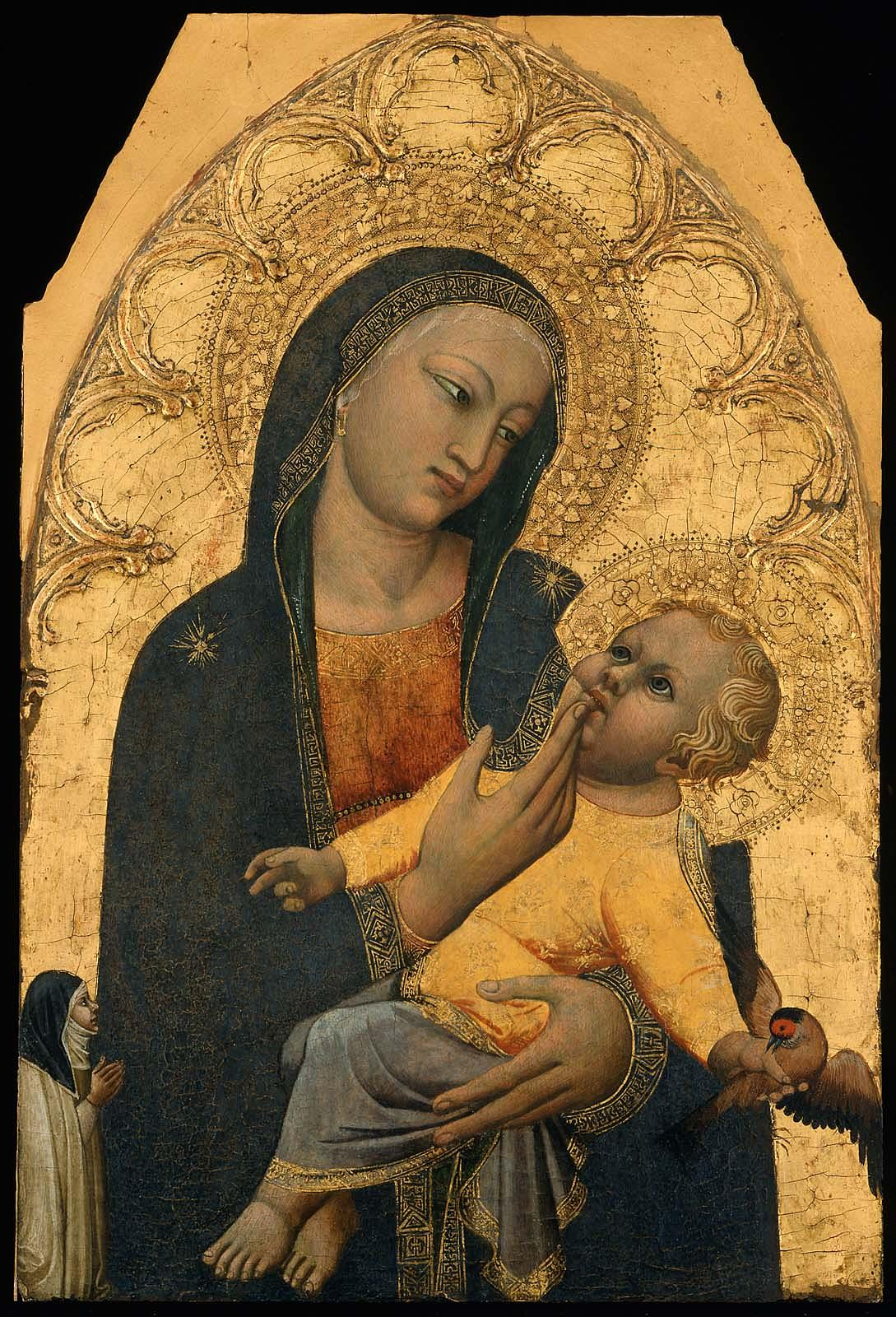
'Virgin and Child', tempera on panel painting by Antonio Veneziano, c. 1380, Museum of Fine Arts, Boston

Antonio Veneziano (Antonio the Venetian), was an Italian painter who was active mainly in Siena, Florence and Pisa, documented between 1369 and 1419.

He was born apparently in Venice, and was a student of Taddeo Gaddi. In 1384–87, Antonio completed the three Saint Ranieri frescoes begun by Andrea da Firenze in the Campo Santo in Pisa. Already deteriorated by time, they were severely damaged during a bombing raid in World War II. In Pisa, he worked alongside Andrea Vanni on the ceilings of the cathedral in 1370. Antonio painted the ceiling of the Capellone degli Spagnuoli in the Basilica di Santa Maria Novella in Florence. In 1374 he was registered in the Apothecaries' Guild, which included painters, of Florence. He also worked on the church of San Nicolò Reale in Palermo for the Compagnia di SS. Niccolo and Francesco, representing Virgin and St. John in grief (1388). He died in Florence. Gherardo Starnina was Antonio Veneziano's most important student.
