= Andrea Pasqualino Marini =

Italian painter

Andrea Pasqualino Marini (c. 1660 - after 1712) was an Italian painter active in the Marche region in a late-Baroque style.

== Biography ==
He was born in Recanati, in the province of Macerata. He appears to have trained in Rome, either under Carlo Maratta or one of his pupils. In Rome, he also helped decorate Sant'Andrea delle Fratte with frescoes. Later in life, he returned to Recanati. In 1697, he painted a processional standard for the Confraternity of the Crucifix in Foligno. He painted an altarpiece depicting San Carlo Borromeo for the church of San Filippo Neri, Recanati. He painted a Mystical Marriage of St Catherine for the church of Santa Maria di Castelnuovo in Recanati.
