= Joseph Tartakovsky =

American lawyer (born 1981)

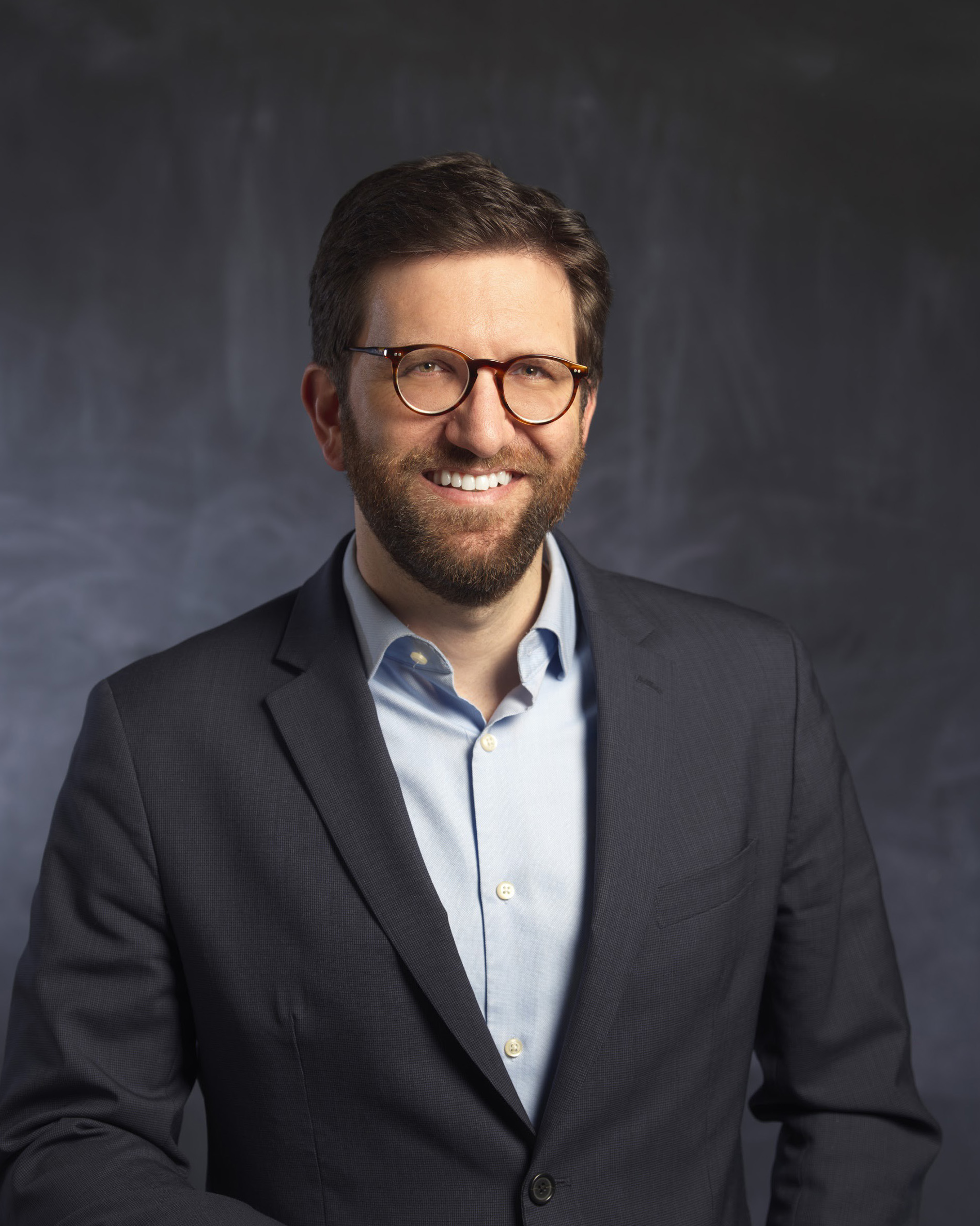
- Tartakovsky in 2018

Deputy Solicitor General of Nevada
- In office 2015–2018
- Attorney General: Adam Paul Laxalt
- Preceded by: Position created
- Succeeded by: Jordan T. Smith

Personal details
- Born: December 10, 1981 (age 44) San Francisco, California, U.S.
- Education: University of California, Santa Barbara (BA); Fordham Law School (JD)

Joseph Tartakovsky (born December 10, 1981) is an American lawyer, writer, and historian, and the former Deputy Solicitor General of Nevada. Tartakovsky also served as an Assistant United States Attorney in the United States Attorney's Office for the Northern District of California in San Francisco where he prosecuted criminal cases. He is currently an attorney with litigation boutique Eimer Stahl LLP in San Francisco.

He is the author two books: The Lives of the Constitution: Ten Exceptional Minds that Shaped America’s Supreme Law (2018) and No Way Home: The Crisis of Homelessness and How to Fix It with Intelligence and Humanity (2021). His book, The Lives of the Constitution, became a #1 bestseller on Amazon.com in the three areas: constitutional law, legal history, and legal biography.

His writings have appeared in publications that include the New York Times, Wall Street Journal, the Los Angeles Times, National Review, The New Criterion, Commentary Magazine, and Forbes. He has been a guest on C-SPAN's Washington Journal. C-SPAN's Book TV featured a book release event for The Lives of the Constitution in Washington, D.C.

== Career history ==
Joseph Tartakovsky served as a law clerk to Judge Paul K. Kelly, Jr., of the United States Court of Appeals for the Tenth Circuit. He was an associate at Gibson Dunn & Crutcher LLC, an international law firm, in San Francisco, where he practiced in criminal defense and civil litigation.

=== Magazine editor ===
At the Claremont Institute for the Study of Statesmanship and Political Philosophy, he was an editor at the Claremont Review of Books and later the James Wilson Fellow in Constitutional Law.

=== Nevada Deputy Solicitor General ===
In 2015, he was appointed Nevada's first Deputy Solicitor General by Adam Laxalt. He served until 2018. In that position he helped oversee Nevada's legal strategy for major litigation in state and federal courts, and advised the Nevada Attorney General and Nevada Governor on matters of statewide importance.

He also helped handle Nevada's docket in the United States Supreme Court and other appeals courts. He has argued and litigated cases on a variety of issues that include education, public lands, free speech, ERISA, gun background checks, and elections. He argued numerous appeals in the U.S. Court of Appeals for the Ninth Circuit and Nevada Supreme Court.

He has been counsel of record in the United States Supreme Court, including with a brief he filed on behalf of 30 states in a criminal case.

In 2016 he co-authored an amicus brief joined by 18 states in support of the petitioner in the U.S. Supreme Court case Trinity Lutheran v. Comer. The Supreme Court agreed with the petitioner, holding that Missouri violated the rights of Trinity Lutheran Church under the Free Exercise Clause by denying the church an otherwise available public benefit on account of its religious status.

=== Private practice and author ===
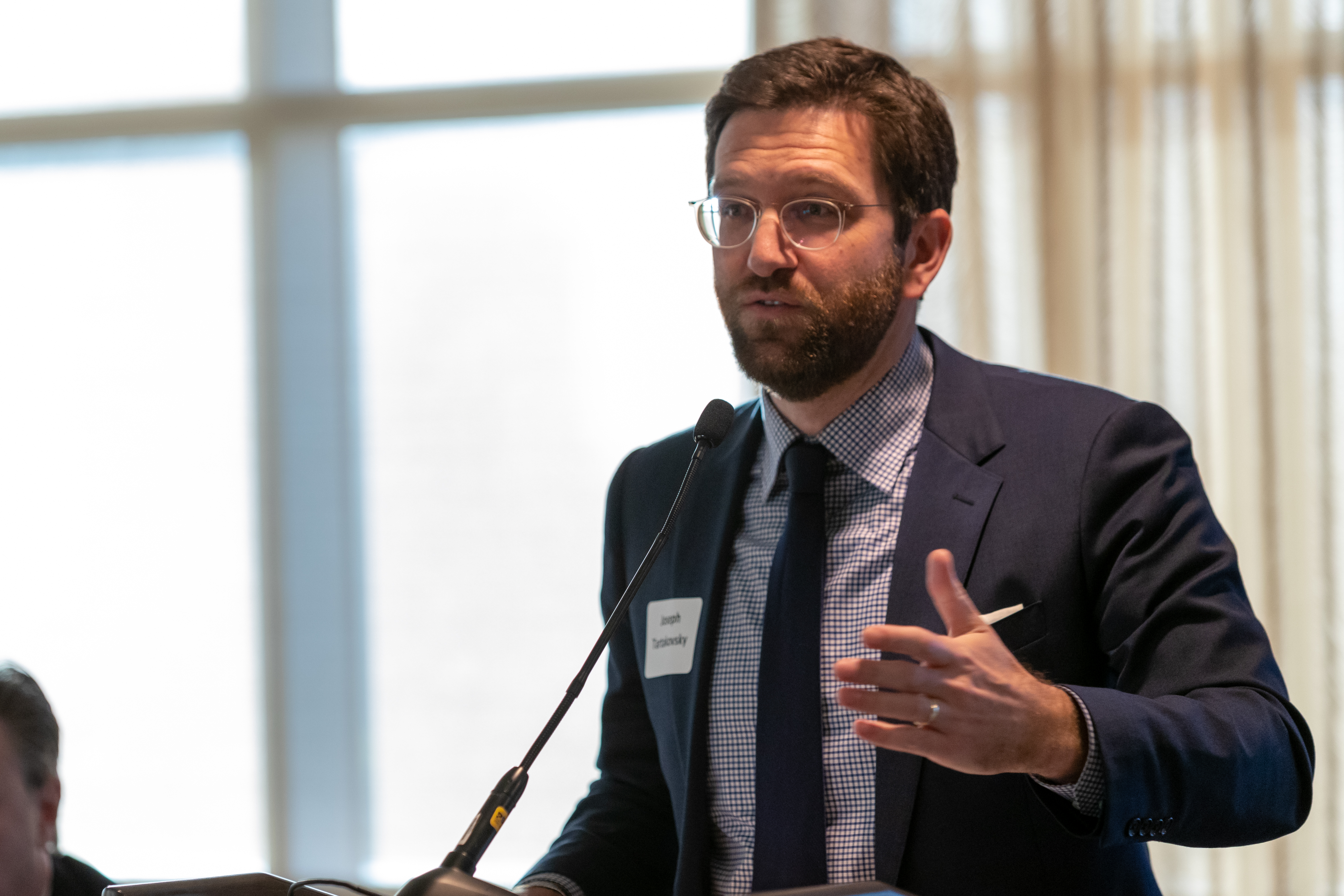
Tartakovsky speaking at a 2020 Pacific Research Institute conference

In 2018, his book, The Lives of the Constitution: Ten Exceptional Minds that Shaped America's Supreme Law, was published.

Tartakovsky later returned to the appellate and constitutional practice at the law firm of Gibson, Dunn & Crutcher in San Francisco, where he practiced constitutional law. While there, he was part of the team challenging, before the U.S. Supreme Court, the decision in Martin v. Boise, in which the U.S. Court of Appeals for the Ninth Circuit that held that anti-camping laws, under certain circumstances, violate the Cruel and Unusual Punishments Clause. The decision remains the subject of debate in cities across the West.

In 2019 he was named the Pacific Research Institute's Adjunct Fellow in Legal Studies.

In March 2021, he contributed to the book, No Way Home: The Crisis of Homelessness and How to Fix It with Intelligence and Humanity, as one of four co-authors.

=== Federal prosecutor ===
As a federal prosecutor, he has handled cases involving organized crime, pharmaceutical diversion, cryptocurrency, fraud, drug trafficking, firearms, cyberstalking, theft of endangered species, embezzlement, and child sexual exploitation, among other offenses.
