= Alfredo Marini =

Italian footballer (born 1915)

Personal information
- Date of birth: 12 December 1915
- Place of birth: Rome, Italy
- Height: 1.68 m (5 ft 6 in)
- Position: Midfielder

Senior career*
Years	Team	Apps	(Gls)
1935–1937	Roma	3	(0)
1937–1938	Rimini	17	(4)
- * Club domestic league appearances and goals

Alfredo Marini (born 12 December 1915, died 5 June 1999) was an Italian professional footballer.

He played for 2 seasons (3 games) in the Serie A for A.S. Roma.

Marini played for A.S. Roma between 1935 and 1936. His debut was on 29 September 1935 in a 2-1 away loss that he started in against Genoa.

His first and only home game came on 6 December 1936 in a 1-0 loss to Bologna. His final match for the club was two weeks later on 20 December, a 1-0 loss away to Milan.

His older brother also played football professionally; to distinguish them, Alfredo was referred to as Marini II.
