= Santi Apostoli Filippo e Giacomo, Orvieto =

Former church in Umbria, Italy

Coordinates: 42.71711°N 12.10929°E

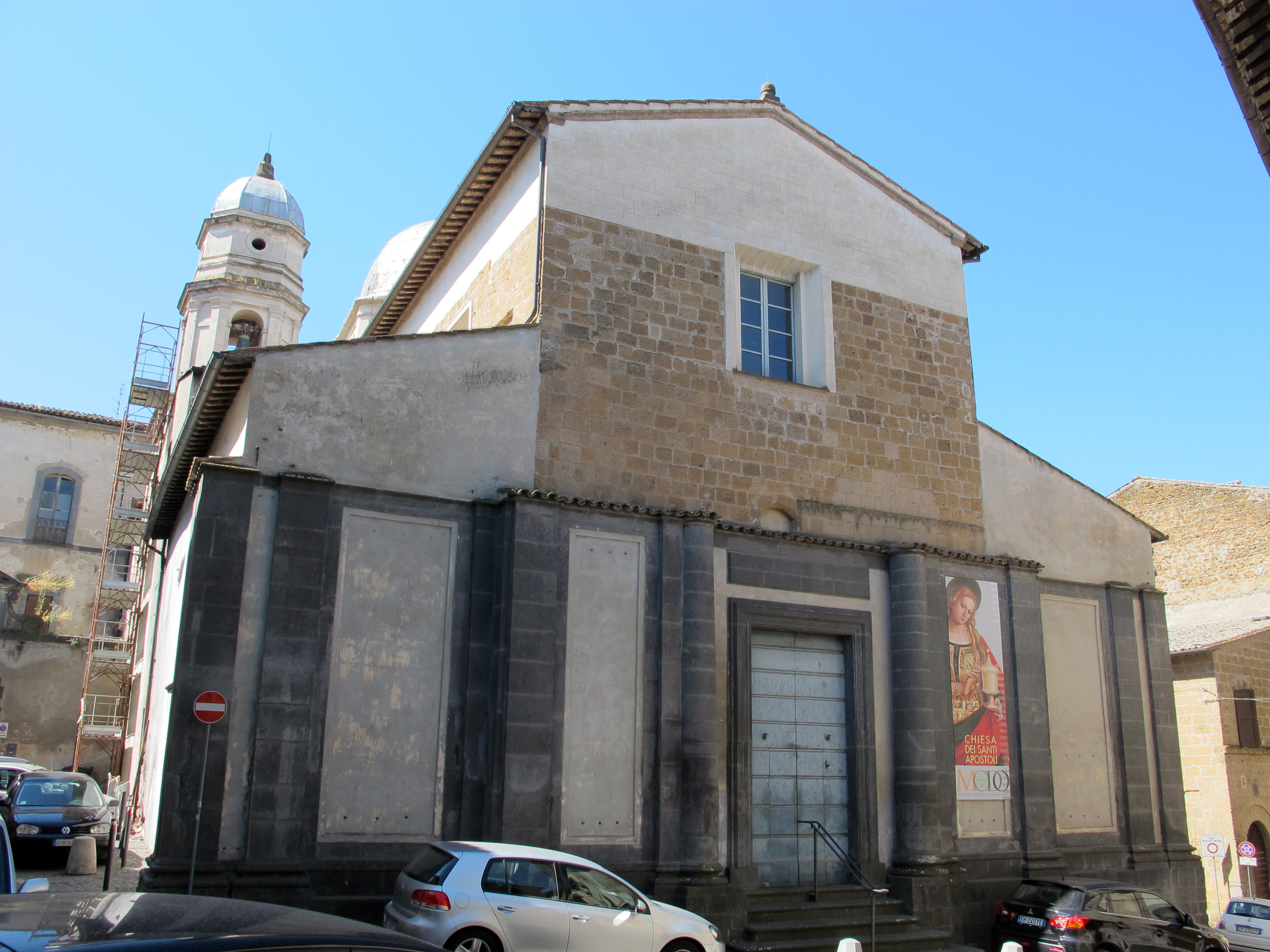
Facade of Santi Apostoli

Santi Apostoli is a deconsecrated former Roman Catholic church located on Via Lattanzi in Orvieto, Umbria, central Italy. The structure is used mainly for exhibitions or events linked to the Museo dell'Opera del Duomo di Orvieto (Museum of the Works of the Cathedral of Orvieto).

== History and description ==
A church at the site was built by the year 1007 under Pope John XVIII. It was linked to the parish of San Lorenzo de' Arari, patronized by local nobility. This structure was likely in dire need of refurbishment when in 1614, part of the endowment of a wealthy merchant active in Venice, Muzio Cappelleti of Allerona, was designated to establish a seminary for the indigent called Collegio Capelletti. In 1621, cardinal and bishop Pier Paolo Crescenzi granted the adjacent Palazzo Monaldeschi to house the school. At some point, the institution was under the Jesuit management. Refurbishment occurred in`1662. However, by 1687, due to a local conflict, the order was expelled from Orvieto. The Jesuit order was suppressed in 1773 by pope Clement XIV. The church became attached to the Seminary of the Bishopric, inaugurated in 1779. The church was reconsecrated by bishop Giovanni Battista Lambruschini in 1819. The octagonal bell tower was completed in 1835.

The facade remains not decorated. The interior with three naves is typical of baroque churches, with a dome at the transept. The structure still contains an altarpiece painted by Vincenzo Pasqualoni depicts the Immaculate Conception with the Saints Apostles Phillip and James. The lateral altarpieces are still in place including a copy of the Crucifixion by Guido Reni. Piccolomini Adami in his guide, recounts a number of plaques in the library of the seminary.
