= Marino Marini (bishop) =

Marino Marini (8 March 1804 – 15 April 1885) was an Italian prelate of the Catholic Church, who worked in the diplomatic service of the Holy See and the Roman Curia. He held the personal title of Bishop of Orvieto from 1865 to 1871.

== Biography ==
He was born in Ascoli Piceno. He worked in the nunciature in Madrid, then studied civil and canon law in Rome. From 1838 to 1850, he was vicar general in Frascati. He was a member of special pontifical delegations for brief periods in Argentina and Mexico, and then worked in the nunciature in Brazil from 1853 to 1856. On 19 June 1857, he was appointed titular archbishop of Palmyra and Apostolic Delegate to Argentina, Bolivia, Chile, Uruguay, and Paraguay. On 17 March 1865, he was given the personal title of Bishop of Orvieto, held until 15 October 1871. Beginning in 1868, he held positions in the Roman Curia, including Secretary of the Congregation for Extraordinary Ecclesiastical Affairs and Substitute of the Secretariat of State. He resigned from those positions on 23 September 1875.

He attended the Vatican Council of 1869–70, where he was a member of the Commission on Discipline.

He died on 15 April 1885 at the age of 81.
