= Klingenstein (surname) =

Klingenstein is a surname. Notable people with the surname include:

- Alan Klingenstein (born 1954), American attorney, investment banker, film distributor and producer
- Joseph Klingenstein (1891–1976), American investment banker
- Thomas Klingenstein (born 1954), American hedge fund manager, grandson of Joseph
