= Emma Waters =

American fertility policy analyst

- Waters speaks at the Danube Institute in 2025
- Born: Emma Leigh Posey; 1997 or 1998 (age 28–29)
- Education: Lee University (B.A.)
- Occupations: Author, policy analyst
- Spouse: Jackson Waters
- Children: 3
- Writing career
- Years active: 2022–present
- Subjects: Feminism, assisted reproductive technology
- Works: Lead Like Jael

Emma Leigh Waters (née Posey; born 1997 or 1998) is an American author and policy analyst. She studies assisted reproductive technology at the Heritage Foundation. A critic of in vitro fertilization (IVF) and commercial surrogacy, Waters has advocated for fringe approaches to treat infertility and for bans on surrogacy arrangements in the U.S. by foreign nationals, and she is a leader within the pro-natalist movement in the United States. She is also the author of Lead Like Jael, a 2026 book offering guidance for Christian women.

== Early life and education ==
Waters grew up in rural southern Georgia. She was the oldest of four homeschooled siblings. Waters graduated as valedictorian from Lee University in Tennessee.

== Career ==
After graduation, Waters moved to Washington, D.C., for an internship and then full-time job at conservative nonprofit organization American Moment. She joined the Heritage Foundation in 2022 as an analyst on emerging fertility technology. She was a 2022–23 public policy fellow at The Fund for American Studies, a 2025 Lincoln Fellow at the Claremont Institute and a visiting fellow emerita at Independent Women's Forum. She is also the host of a podcast on fertility issues. As of 2026, she was a senior policy analyst at Heritage's Center for Technology and the Human Person.

In March 2026, Regnery published Waters' Lead Like Jael: 7 Timeless Principles for Today’s Women of Faith. According to Emma Green in The New Yorker, the book urges "something of a middle path" between the motifs of the "girlboss" and the "tradwife": "women should recognize that there are seasons of life with different demands, and see their roles as wives and mothers not as a retreat from work but as a chance to build a foundation." Green added that Lead Like Jael was published "into a moment of wider exhaustion and uncertainty about the models of a good life on offer." (The Jael of the title is the biblical Jael of the book of Judges, who lures an enemy commander to her tent, feeds him, then drives a tent peg through his head while he sleeps.) In American Reformer, Scott Yenor wrote that Waters "makes the biblical case for what I call the side-hustle tradwife, a woman who works, as Waters writes, 'either out of necessity or desire,' yet puts her 'home and relationships first.'"

== Policy advocacy ==
Waters' policy work has been a major factor in making fertility regulation a mainstream topic. According to Emi Nietfeld in Wired magazine, Waters is "a kind of backroom wheeler-dealer and political strategist" who was "the mastermind behind Florida's recent ban on international surrogacy, the Texas GOP's souring on IVF, and the squashing of [Donald] Trump's 'fertilization president' initiatives." The New York Times described her as a "rising leader" in a conservative movement to promote traditional family life and mores.

Waters has advocated for "restorative reproductive medicine" (RRM), which purports to treat "root causes" of infertility such as endometriosis, low sperm count, hormonal imbalances and lifestyle factors. The New York Times described RRM as "an approach long confined to the medical fringe" that has gained currency among conservative Republicans and Make America Healthy Again (MAHA) activists in the second Trump administration. The American College of Obstetricians and Gynecologists has said that RRM is unproven and not based on science.

After Trump proposed free IVF during his 2024 presidential campaign, Waters led a coalition of MAHA activists, anti-abortion groups and medical practitioners who advocated for RRM as an alternative to wider use of IVF. Waters drafted model legislation that would mandate insurance coverage for RRM, and she was the "point person" who advocated for its spring 2025 passage by the Arkansas General Assembly. In July 2025, the U.S. Department of Health and Human Services deployed funds from a birth control program to support RRM training. She was also involved in a proposal from the Trump administration to encourage employers to include RRM coverage in their insurance plans.

Waters became a critic of IVF's effectiveness and has said that it encourages young women to delay fertility until it may be too late for them to conceive. She is also a proponent of pro-natalist policies like baby bonuses and financial incentives to marry before 30. Nietfeld described Waters as occupying the "trad wing" of the pro-natalist movement, at odds with the "tech right" wing that embraces surrogacy, artificial wombs and genetic engineering of embryos. She called Waters "in certain ways ... a voice of reason" in the fertility technology sector who fills the gap between liberals who support reproductive choice but do not discuss ethical pitfalls of reproductive technology on one hand, and right-wing advocates for new technologies that might improve fertility rates on the other. According to Nietfeld, the United States is an outlier among wealthy countries in permitting unregulated commercial surrogacy, embryo sex selection and genetic testing, and Democratic Party silence on the issues has resulted in ceding the topic to Waters and her allies.

Waters is also a critic of commercial surrogacy, especially when American surrogates are hired by foreign nationals. A 2025 Senate bill that would ban citizens of "hostile foreign regimes"—including China—was described by Nietfeld as part of "Waters' master plan to undermine the fertility industry." In May 2025, a similar law was enacted at the state level in Florida. Model legislation developed by Heritage that would require transparency from fertility clinics of data on embryo donation, destruction and preservation was considered in Arkansas, Oklahoma and Texas. Waters said that the legislation was aimed at helping lawmakers understand "the extent of the current fertility industry". A group of reproductive medical practitioners criticized the model legislation in The New England Journal of Medicine.

== Personal life ==
Waters met her husband, Jack, while in college. They married in 2022. Waters lives in Ambridge, Pennsylvania, where her husband is a seminarian at Trinity Anglican Seminary. They have three daughters.
