= Charles Haywood =

American businessman and far-right political activist

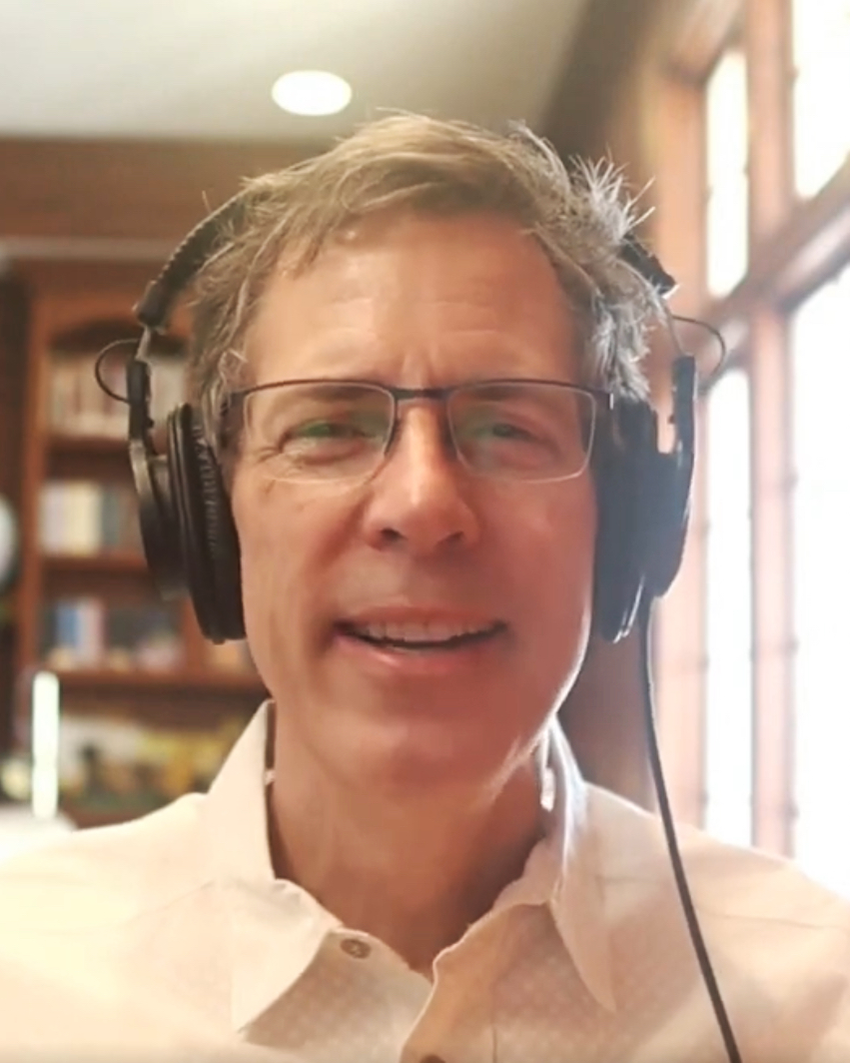
Charles Haywood

Charles Haywood is an American businessman and far-right blogger and commentator. He founded Mansfield-King, an Indianapolis haircare manufacturer, which he sold in 2020. He subsequently founded a far-right men's organization, the Society for American Civic Renewal. He has predicted the collapse of the United States and described his desire to become a "warlord" of an "armed patronage network". He has also expressed support for the January 6 United States Capitol attack.

== Career ==
Haywood was educated at the University of Chicago Law School and the University of Chicago Booth School of Business, and practiced mergers and acquisitions law. In 2005, he founded Mansfield-King, an Indianapolis-based manufacturer of shampoos, conditioners, and gels that reported revenues of $34.6 million in 2018 and had a forecast revenue of $50 million in 2020. By 2018, the company was co-owned by his wife, Alison Murphy. He sold the company to PLZ Aeroscience Corp in 2020.

== Views and political activities ==
Haywood became known as a right-wing writer through book reviews on conservative websites. On his website, The Worthy House, he outlines a political philosophy he calls Foundationalism. He has argued that the replacement of the United States government as presently constituted by an authoritarian regime is inevitable. He predicts that the United States government will collapse, and expressed his desire to become a "warlord" of what he calls an "armed patronage network".

Shortly prior to the sale of Mansfield-King, Haywood incorporated the far-right Society for American Civic Renewal (SACR). According to The Guardian, SACR is an invitation-only exclusively male group that aims for a "civilizational renaissance". The group's website describes it as "'raising accountable leaders to help build thriving communities of free citizens' who will rebuild 'the frontier-conquering spirit of America'" and promises to "counter and conquer" the "poison" of "those who rule today". SACR uses a cross-like insignia, described on the website as symbolizing "sword and shield" and rejection of "Modernist philosophies and heresies". Filings show the group owns four lodges, three in Idaho (Moscow, Boise, and Coeur d'Alene) and another in Dallas, Texas.

Haywood believes that women should not have careers, and that women with careers should be socially stigmatized. He has also expressed contempt for men who he considers "feminized," and blames mixed-sex education for a lack of male masculinity.

Haywood has praised the January 6 attack on the United States Capitol as an "electoral justice protest". He has described his fortified home as a compound, and said that it requires loyal armed "shooters" to defend it. In a 2023 discussion hosted by Christopher Rufo, he expressed support for forming alliances with white nationalists and dictators in order to "destroy the left", citing Augusto Pinochet and Francisco Franco as examples.

Haywood's views have been criticized by other right-wing American commentators. In 2022, Rod Dreher described him in The American Conservative as "crazy", writing: "Charles Haywood is so filled with hatred of the Left that he happily claims a Nazi sympathizer as his ally". In 2023, after the publication of the article in The Guardian about SACR, conservative commentator Glenn Beck condemned Haywood as a "false prophet". He described the organization as "extremely disturbing" and said Haywood is "infiltrating everything".

Haywood has appeared on Michael Anton's podcasts for the Claremont Institute, and written for the Claremont Institute website. He is also chair of the New Tomorrow Political Action Committee, formerly Unify Carmel, a conservative education pressure group in Carmel, Indiana.

In July 2026, Haywood praised a speech by Thomas Rousseau, a leader of the white supremacist Patriot Front organization, writing on X that "This speech is very good. And this guy is very impressive."

=== Political funding ===
Haywood's funding of right wing causes is conducted through the Howdy Doody Good Times Foundation, a personal foundation that he directs and serves as its Secretary-Treasury. According to ProPublica, Howdy Doody Good Times Foundation is a recurring funder of SACR, the Claremont Institute, The American Conservative magazine, and American Moment, a junior staff recruiting/training organization that was founded in 2021 with the support of JD Vance.

== Personal life ==
As of 2023, Haywood had been married for 21 years to Alison Murphy, an entrepreneur who grew up in Australia. In 2018, Murphy founded William Roam, a personal-care products company. Haywood, Murphy, and his wife's five children live in Carmel, Indiana.
