= Ellmers =

Ellmers is a surname. Notable people with the surname include:

- Glenn Ellmers, American political commentator
- Renee Ellmers (born 1964), American politician

== See also ==
- Ellmer, another surname
