= Federalism, the Supreme Court, and the Seventeenth Amendment =

2001 book

- Author: Ralph A. Rossum
- Publisher: Lexington Books
- Publication date: 2001
- Publication place: United States
- ISBN: 978-0-739-15499-1

Federalism, the Supreme Court, and the Seventeenth Amendment: The Irony of Constitutional Democracy is a 2001 book by American author Ralph A. Rossum. Rossum argues that U.S. state sovereignty was ensured in the Constitution through structural powers, not judicial review, and that the stripping of state legislatures' powers to elect U.S. senators killed that federalist system.

== References and further reading ==
- Gleicher, Jules (July 1, 2010). "Did the Seventeenth Amendment Repeal Federalism?". Political Science Reviewer. 39: 87–128 – via EBSCOHost.
- Peacock, Anthony A. (Winter 2003). "Federalism's nemesis: Federalism is dead, and the 17th Amendment killed it". Review. Claremont Review of Books. Vol. 3, no. 1.
- Vile, John R. (Winter 2004). "Federalism, the Supreme Court, and the Seventeenth Amendment by Ralph Rossum". Review. Publius. 34 (1): 76–78. JSTOR 3331159.
- Yenor, Scott (Spring 2002). "Federalism, the Supreme Court, and the Seventeenth Amendment: The Irony of Constitutional Democracy; Rossum, Ralph". Review. Perspectives on Political Science. 31 (2): 521. ProQuest 194696287
