= Mildred Hilson =

American socialite and philanthropist

- Born: Mildred Helen Stern; March 30, 1898; Brooklyn, New York City, New York, U.S.
- Died: December 10, 1994 (aged 96); Manhattan, New York City, New York, U.S.
- Political party: Republican
- Spouse: Edwin I. Hilson (m. 1924; died 1952)
- Children: 2

Mildred Helen Hilson (née Stern; March 30, 1898 – December 10, 1994) was an American socialite, philanthropist and patron of the arts. A staunch supporter of the Republican Party, she befriended multiple Republican presidents.

== Life ==
Hilson was born Mildred Helen Stern in Brooklyn on March 30, 1898. In 1924, she married investment banker Edwin I. Hilson (1895–1952), later senior partner at Wertheim & Co. They had two children: John Stern Hilson (1925–1991) and Mary Hilson (1930–1987). Her husband died in 1952.

Following her husband's death, she took his seat on the board of the Hospital for Special Surgery, five years later she was named vice president and remained in this role until her death. She raised over $15 million for the hospital through its annual benefit.

Vice chairwoman of the Women's National Republican Club, she was also a major fundraiser for the Republican Party and volunteered on several citizens' committees to elect or re-elect Republican candidates to state and national office. She befriended every Republican president from Dwight D. Eisenhower on. President Eisenhower painted a portrait of her which hung in her study and Mamie Eisenhower was a close friend. At her 90th birthday party at The St. Regis, former President Richard Nixon played Happy Birthday on the piano while the 200 guests sang along.

Hilson also gave generously to the arts, serving on the board of the Museum of the City of New York and the New York City Cultural Council. During John Lindsay's term as Mayor of New York City in the late 1960s, she served as his unsalaried representative on cultural affairs.

She lived for much of her life in Waldorf Towers. It was here, in 1971, she met and befriended George H. W. Bush, who had just been appointed American ambassador to the United Nations, and his wife, Barbara. She first met Mrs. Bush in March 1971 in the elevator and invited her to a dinner she was hosting for the Duke and Duchess of Windsor that May. She hosted a dinner for the Bushes in her apartment upon his election as Vice President of the United States. She also entertained Laurence Olivier and Hubert de Givenchy. In 1989, when she was bedridden due to illness, Givenchy brought one of his models to Hilson's apartment to show her his spring collection. She also wore the designs of Bill Blass, once remarking to Blass during a fitting at the age 90, " "Bill, I hope you can get this dress delivered to me before I die." To which he replied, "I can't guarantee it."

In 1989, the plaza of a new hospital residence at the Hospital for Special Surgery was dedicated in her honor. That same year, the New York City division of the American Cancer Society gave her its humanitarian award. She was also awarded the women's division of Albert Einstein College of Medicine's Sarnoff Award for her volunteer service.

She died at home on December 10, 1994, at the age of 96. Her funeral was held at Temple Emanu-El of New York. Former First Lady Barbara Bush, Walter Cronkite, David Eisenhower and David Brown were among the eulogists. Many of her person effects were auctioned off at Christie's on October 14, 1995.
