= Claremont Institute =

American conservative think tank

Coordinates: 34°06′27″N 117°40′25″W

- Claremont Institute for the Study of Statesmanship and Political Philosophy
- Formation: 1979 (47 years ago)
- Founded at: Claremont, California, US
- Type: Nonprofit
- Tax ID no.: 95-3443202
- Legal status: 501(c)(3)
- Purpose: Policy advocacy
- Headquarters: Ste 120; 1317 W Foothill Blvd; Upland, CA 91786-3675; United States (Note: IRS Form-990 yr2018 shows corporate address in Upland)
- Locations: Claremont, California; Upland, California
- President: Ryan P. Williams (Note: Williams became president in 2017)
- Chair: Thomas D. Klingenstein (Note: Klingenstein became chairman in fiscal year ending June 30, 2011)
- Key people: John C. Eastman; Charles R. Kesler
- Revenue: $13.2 million (2025)
- Expenses: $10.2 million (2025)
- Staff: 56 (2024)
- Website: claremont.org

The Claremont Institute is an American right-wing think tank based in Upland, California. It was founded in 1979 by four students of the Straussian political theorist Harry V. Jaffa. The institute publishes books and other periodicals and operates fellowship programs that have included prominent conservative figures. Ryan P. Williams has served as president since 2017, and Thomas D. Klingenstein has chaired the board of trustees since approximately 2010.

The institute became an early and influential defender of Donald Trump and has been described by The Daily Beast as having done more than any other organization to build a philosophical case for Trump's brand of conservatism. It played a significant role in the first Trump administration and received the National Humanities Medal from Trump in 2019. Following the 2020 presidential election, senior fellow John Eastman assisted Trump in trying to overturn the election results, including attempting to persuade Vice President Mike Pence to reject the electoral count, and he spoke at the January 6, 2021, rally preceding the Capitol attack.

The institute has attracted substantial criticism. Commentators have cited its fellowship grants to figures associated with conspiracy theories, essays questioning the citizenship eligibility of political figures, and publications by authors affiliated with far-right networks as evidence of its drift toward the political fringe.

== History ==
Founded by four students of Straussian political theorist Harry V. Jaffa (a professor emeritus at Claremont McKenna College and the Claremont Graduate University), the Claremont Institute has no affiliation with any of the Claremont Colleges.

Under Jaffa and Larry P. Arnn, the institute became a Straussian-influenced conservative think tank, publishing on topics such as statesmanship, Lincoln scholarship, and modern conservative issues.

Arnn served as its president from 1985 until 2000, when he became the twelfth president of Hillsdale College. Thomas Klingenstein has been the chairman of the board of trustees since approximately 2010. Michael Pack was president from 2015 to 2017. Ryan P. Williams assumed the post in 2017.

The Claremont Institute publishes the Claremont Review of Books, The American Mind, The American Story Podcast, and Claremont Books.

Claremont Institute fellowships have gone to prominent figures on the right such as Laura Ingraham, Ben Shapiro, Mark Levin, Mary Kissel, and Charles C. Johnson. The institute granted a fellowship in 2019 to the Pizzagate conspiracy theorist Jack Posobiec. National Review columnist Mona Charen wrote that "Claremont stands out for beclowning itself with this embrace of the smarmy underside of American politics." In 2020, Mark Joseph Stern of Slate magazine called the institute "a racist fever swamp with deep connections to the conspiratorial alt-right", citing Posobiec's fellowship and the publication of a 2020 essay by senior fellow John Eastman that questioned Kamala Harris's eligibility for the vice presidency. In 2022, The American Mind published an editorial by Raw Egg Nationalist, an author affiliated with publishing house Antelope Hill.

=== Trump advocacy and connections ===
The Claremont Institute was an early defender of Donald Trump. The Daily Beast stated Claremont "arguably has done more than any other group to build a philosophical case for Trump's brand of conservatism".

In September 2016, the institute's Claremont Review of Books published Michael Anton's "The Flight 93 Election" editorial. Written under a pseudonym, it compared the prospect of conservatives letting Trump lose to Hillary Clinton in the 2016 presidential election with passengers not charging the cockpit of the United Airlines aircraft hijacked by Al-Qaeda in 2001. The article went viral and received widespread coverage across the political spectrum. Rush Limbaugh devoted a day of his radio series to reading the entire essay. Anton would go on to serve under President Trump as spokesman for the National Security Council, holding the position from 2017 to 2018.

The institute became a significant player in the Trump administration, adding a Washington office and contributing ideas and personnel to the administration. In 2019, Trump awarded the Claremont Institute with a National Humanities Medal. In June 2020, former Claremont Institute president Michael Pack became head of the U.S. Agency for Global Media under Trump.

During the 2020 COVID-19 pandemic, the institute received between $350,000 and $1 million in federally backed small-business loans from Chain Bridge Bank as part of the Paycheck Protection Program. The institute stated this would allow it to retain 29 jobs.

According to a November 2021 Vice article, the actions of pro-Trump Claremont Institute leaders—senior fellows John Eastman, Brian Kennedy, Angelo Codevilla, and Michael Anton, as well as Ryan P. Williams (the institute's president), and Thomas D. Klingenstein (chairman of the board)—culminated in the January 6 attack on the Capitol. Williams has stated that the institute's mission "is to save western civilization". Vice asserted that Codevilla, who frequently denounced the "ruling class", coined the term "cold civil war" in 2017. On January 5, 2021, using the hashtag #HoldTheLine, Claremont president emeritus Brian Kennedy tweeted from Capitol Hill: "We are in a constitutional crisis and also in a revolutionary moment... We must embrace the spirit of the American Revolution to stop this communist revolution." In early January 2021, along with Trump and other advisors, Eastman unsuccessfully attempted to persuade then-vice president Mike Pence to overturn the 2020 presidential election results. He also spoke at Trump's rally on January 6, 2021, before the attack on the Capitol. The details of Eastman's attempt, described in a book by journalists Bob Woodward and Robert Costa, made national headlines in September 2021.

Shortly afterward, the American Political Science Association canceled panels involving Eastman and Claremont at its 2021 conference. In April 2022, Thomas B. Edsall of The New York Times wrote in a guest essay that the Claremont Institute, as well as the institute's magazine American Mind and other publications, comprised the "substantial intellectual infrastructure that has buoyed the Trumpist right and its willingness to rupture moral codes and to discard traditional norms". An anonymous former fellow said Eastman's ideas are based on the doctrine of natural rights, which has been a key element of the institute's politics for many years. He said, "That's how Claremont goes from this quirky intellectual outfit to one of the main intellectual architects of trying to overthrow the republic." Senior fellow Charles Kesler, who believes Eastman's advice was wrong, said the institute is split between "some who continue to believe that the election was stolen and some who have denied that from the beginning".

The Claremont Institute has hosted Charles Haywood on their podcast. Haywood, a far-right extremist, has described the January 6 attacks as an "electoral justice protest" and wrote about his desire to lead as a "warlord" of an "armed patronage network" following the collapse of the United States. Haywood founded an organisation, the Society for American Civic Renewal, to which Claremont has donated $26,248. Claremont's president Ryan Williams acknowledged that Claremont "acted as a fiscal sponsor to help the Society for American Civic Renewal (SACR) establish itself as an incorporated 501(c)(10)"; he also acknowledged being a founding board member of SACR, continuing into 2024. The Guardian described SACR as an "exclusive, men-only fraternal order which aims to replace the US government with an authoritarian 'aligned regime', and which experts say is rooted in extreme Christian nationalism and religious autocracy.

=== Biden years ===
In 2021, Claremont senior fellow Glenn Ellmers wrote an essay in The American Mind, arguing that the United States had been destroyed by internal enemies and that a "counter-revolution" was necessary to defeat the majority of the people who "can no longer be considered fellow citizens". According to Ellmers, "Most people living in the United States today—certainly more than half—are not Americans in any meaningful sense of the term."

Williams, the institute's president, said its mission is to "save Western civilization", particularly from the threat he said is posed by the progressive movement. In 2023, the Claremont Institute hired Boise State University professor Scott Yenor as its inaugural senior director of state coalitions.

Claremont is a member of the advisory board of Project 2025, a collection of conservative and right-wing policy proposals from the Heritage Foundation to reshape the US federal government and consolidate executive power should the Republican nominee win the 2024 presidential election.

== Publications ==
The Claremont Institute publishes the Claremont Review of Books, edited by Charles R. Kesler, which features regular columns by Martha Bayles, Mark Helprin, Michael Anton, and Spencer Klavan. The institute also publishes The American Mind. Claremont Vice President of Education Matt Peterson serves as editor, and James Poulos is executive editor. The publication has featured essays by Newt Gingrich, Todd Young, Marco Rubio, Jim Banks, and Tom Cotton.

== Notable fellows ==
- William B. Allen (born 1944), political scientist
- Ryan T. Anderson (born 1981), political commentator
- Michael Anton (born 1969), writer and government official
- Larry P. Arnn (born 1952), educator and writer
- Megan Basham, writer
- Guy Benson (born 1985), talk radio host and journalist
- James Braid (born 1990), legislative aide
- Chris Buskirk (born 1968 or 1969), political writer and venture capitalist
- Jeremy Carl, commentator and author
- Angelo Codevilla (1943–2021), political philosopher and writer
- Matthew Continetti (born 1981), journalist
- Tom Cotton (born 1977), politician
- Chuck DeVore (born 1962), politician
- Sadanand Dhume, journalist
- Ben Domenech (born 1982), writer
- Ross Douthat (born 1976), author and columnist
- John Eastman (born 1960), legal scholar
- Michael Ellis (born 1984 or 1985), lawyer and government official
- Wes Goodman (born 1984), politician
- Larry Greenfield (1962–2022), activist and political commentator
- Josh Hammer (born 1989), political commentator and lawyer
- Stephen F. Hayes, journalist
- Mark Helprin (born 1947), author, journalist, and commentator
- Mollie Hemingway (born 1974), author, columnist, and political commentator
- Scott A. Keller, lawyer and professor
- Charles R. Kesler (born 1956), editor and author
- Charlie Kirk (1993–2025), political activist
- Mary Kissel, journalist
- Sarah Knafo (born 1993), French politician
- Michael Knowles (born 1990), political commentator and author
- Mark Levin (born 1957), lawyer, radio and television personality
- Vincent Phillip Muñoz, political scientist
- Michael Needham (born 1981), political advisor
- Christine O'Donnell (born 1969), politician
- Bre Payton (1992–2018), journalist
- Ronald J. Pestritto (born 1968), academic
- Jack Posobiec (born 1984), alt-right activist and conspiracy theorist
- Harold W. Rood (1922–2011), political scientist
- Christopher Rufo (born 1984), conservative activist
- Anthony Sabatini (born 1988), politician
- Ben Shapiro (born 1984), political commentator
- Tevi Troy (born 1967), historian, writer, and government official
- Russell Vought (born 1976), government official
- Emma Waters, policy analyst
- Thomas G. West (born 1945), academic
