= Ellmer =

Ellmer is a surname. Notable people with the surname include:

- Max Ellmer (1909–1984), Swiss tennis player
- Rolf Ellmer (born 1960), German electronic musician

== See also ==
- Ellmers, another surname
- Eller (surname)
- Elmer
