= Michael Anton =

American writer and government official (born 1969)

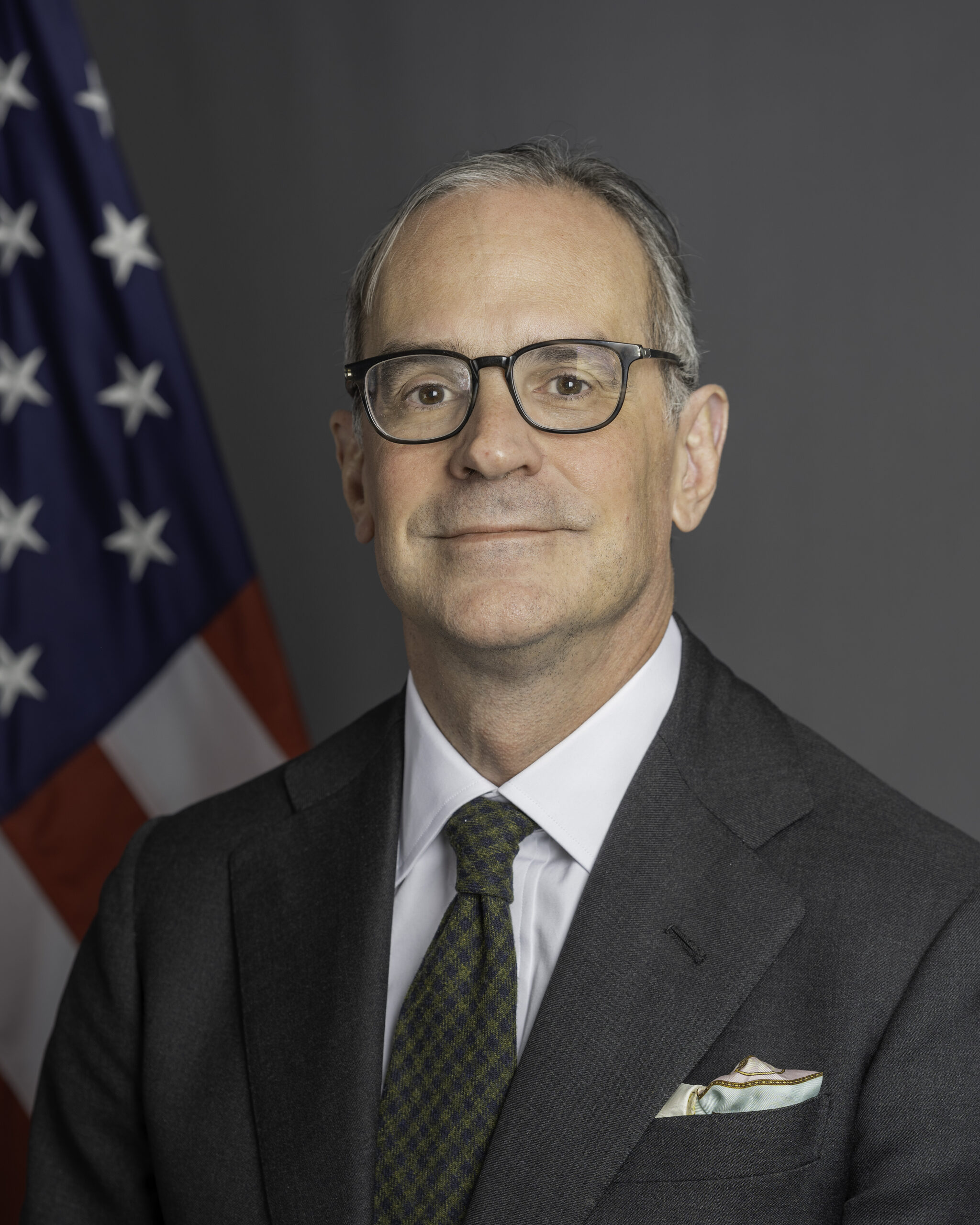
- Official portrait, 2025

33rd Director of Policy Planning
- In office January 20, 2025 – September 15, 2025
- President: Donald Trump
- Preceded by: Salman Ahmed
- Succeeded by: Michael Needham

Deputy Assistant to the President for Strategic Communications
- In office February 8, 2017 – April 8, 2018
- President: Donald Trump
- Preceded by: Ben Rhodes
- Succeeded by: Garrett Marquis; Sarah Tinsley

Personal details
- Born: 1969 (age 56–57)
- Party: Republican
- Education: University of California, Davis (BA); St. John's College, Annapolis (MALA); Claremont Graduate University (MA)

Michael Anton (born 1969) is an American right-wing writer and government official.

Anton wrote "The Flight 93 Election" (under a pseudonym), an influential essay in support of Donald Trump during the 2016 presidential campaign. He was a speechwriter for Rupert Murdoch, a director of communications at Citigroup, and a managing director at BlackRock. He lectured at Hillsdale College, and is a Claremont Institute senior fellow. He contributed to Project 2025.

Anton was the director of policy planning in the second Trump administration, and deputy assistant for strategic communications on the National Security Council during the first. He wrote speeches for Rudy Giuliani, and for Condoleezza Rice at the National Security Council under George W. Bush. Anton also worked for California Governor Pete Wilson.

== Early life and education ==
Anton is of Italian, Greek and Lebanese descent. He grew up in Loomis, California, an exurb of Sacramento. He received his bachelor's degree from the University of California, Davis, and earned advanced degrees from St. John's College and the Claremont Graduate University.

== Career ==
Anton was a speechwriter and press secretary for New York Mayor Rudy Giuliani. He later took a mid-level job at the United States National Security Council (NSC) in the administration of President George W. Bush. He worked as the press secretary of national security advisor Condoleezza Rice. In 2005, Anton left the U.S. government and became a speechwriter for Rupert Murdoch at News Corp. He then worked as director of communications at the investment bank Citigroup, and a year and a half as managing director of investing firm BlackRock.

Anton joined the NSC as deputy assistant to the president for strategic communications in February 2017. He resigned on April 8, 2018, the evening before John R. Bolton became Trump's national security advisor. He then joined Hillsdale College's Kirby Center Graduate School of Government. He also became a Claremont Institute senior fellow during this time.

In December 2020, Trump appointed Anton to a four-year term on the National Board for Education Sciences, which advises the Department of Education on scientific research and investments.

According to The Washington Post in November 2024, Anton was a leading candidate to be Donald Trump's deputy national security advisor, but removed himself from consideration after learning the National Security Council would include a position for Sebastian Gorka. In December 2024, Trump nominated Anton to serve as the director of policy planning at the State Department. Anton participated in the 2025 Iran–United States negotiations.

In August 2025, Anton was set to leave the Department of State after having written the national security strategy; sources told Politico that Anton grew frustrated with Sergio Gor and the foreign policy processes of the administration.

== Views ==
Anton is considered to be a notable West Coast Straussian, as a student of Leo Strauss by way of tutor Harry V. Jaffa. Anton has contributed to Project 2025.

=== Against diversity ===
Anton has derided American diversity in his writing, arguing in a pseudonymous March 2016 essay diversity is a source of weakness, tension and disunion." In the same essay, written under the pseudonym Publius Decius Mus (after the ancient Roman consul), Anton defended Donald Trump's use of the slogan "America First" by arguing that the America First Committee (which included prominent antisemites and opposed the United States entering World War II) had been "unfairly maligned." He also argued that Islam "is a militant faith", and that "only an insane society" would take in Muslim immigrants after the 9/11 attacks.

=== After the Flight 93 Election ===
His pseudonymous September 2016 editorial "The Flight 93 Election", published in the Claremont Review of Books, compared the prospect of conservatives letting Hillary Clinton win the 2016 United States presidential election with passengers not charging the cockpit of the United Airlines aircraft hijacked by Al-Qaeda in the 9/11 attacks. In the essay, Anton criticized conservatives who were skeptical of Donald Trump, and he also decried the "ceaseless importation of Third World foreigners," called for "no more importing poverty, crime, and alien cultures", called the idea of Islamophobia and the Black Lives Matter movement "inanities", and argued that the American left was waging "wars on 'cis-genderism'". Rush Limbaugh devoted the bulk of a radio show in September 2016 to a reading of the editorial.

In 2019, Anton turned his essay into a book, titled After the Flight 93 Election: The Vote that Saved America and What We Still Have to Lose. In it he argued that Trump constituted "the first serious national-political defense of the Constitution in a generation." Trump praised the book. According to Carlos Lozada, the book was simply an extension of Anton's 2016 editorial long rants against liberalism. Lozada wrote, "Anton spends virtually no time detailing or defending particular policies of the Trump administration; all that matters is the enemy. For Anton, Hillary Clinton is no longer the chief nemesis—the entire left is, along with sellout conservatives and any other forces countering the president. They contribute to a 'spiritual sickness' and 'existential despair' pervading not just the United States but all the West . . . Apparently, Flight 93 did not end with the 2016 vote; we are forever on the plane, endlessly in danger, no matter who has seized the controls."

=== Birthright citizenship ===
Anton is known as a critic of birthright citizenship in the United States, arguing that the Fourteenth Amendment to the United States Constitution does not mandate jus soli ("right of the soil") citizenship, and that the Amendment's use of the provision "subject to the jurisdiction thereof" excludes children born of illegal aliens. Another of Anton's arguments depends on his spurious insertion of the word "or" into part of an 1875 speech by Senator Jacob Howard: where Howard said birthright citizenship should naturally be denied to those "foreigners, aliens, who belong to the families of ambassadors," Anton wrote instead that it should be denied to all "foreigners, aliens, or [those] who belong to the families of ambassadors."

=== Coup conspiracy ===
In September 2020, Anton wrote an essay titled "The Coming Coup?" in The American Mind; in the essay, Anton suggested that Democrats, aided by George Soros, were planning a coup d'état to take over the United States by way of a domestic color revolution coordinated by the so-called Deep State and influential operatives of the Democratic Party. The widely shared article was called a tipping point in spreading the false claim, which was further popularized by The Federalist, DJHJ Media and Dan Bongino. Anton has referred to the U.S. commitment to defend Taiwan as a "Cold War relic," stating that it is not in the interest of the U.S. to defend it.

=== Regime propaganda ===
Anton wrote an essay in The American Mind on rhetoric strategies. In it he coined the term "celebration parallax" to describe a feature of political discourse, by which the merit of what is said depends on who says it (that is, a thing is acknowledged to be true when someone praises it but denied when someone criticizes it). Right-wing political commentator Jeremy Carl went on to complain about the phenomenon regarding mass immigration.

=== Red caesarism ===
In his 2020 book, The Stakes, Anton developed the concept of "red caesarism": the idea that the republic is only safeguarded by an elected strong man "form of one-man rule: halfway ... between monarchy and tyranny". According to this doctrine, "Caesar's word replaces constitutionalism and even, in the final analysis, law".

== Personal life ==
Anton is a classically trained chef and a Francophile; after resigning from the National Security Council in 2018, he worked one last day as a line cook to prepare a state dinner for Emmanuel Macron.

Anton has written over 40,000 posts on Styleforum.net, focusing on tailoring and classic menswear. Under the pseudonym "Nicholas Antongiavanni," he wrote in 2006 The Suit, a parody of Niccolò Machiavelli's The Prince.

== Books ==
- Antongiavanni, Nicholas (2006). The Suit: A Machiavellian Approach to Men's Style. New York: HarperCollins. ISBN 9780060891862.
- After the Flight 93 Election: The Vote that Saved America and What We Still Have to Lose. Encounter Books. 2019. ISBN 9781641770606.
- The Stakes: America at the Point of No Return. Regnery Publishing. 2020. ISBN 9781684510610.
- Dispatches from the Late Republic: The Culture, Politics, and Prophets of American Greatness, Decline, and Rebirth. New York: Encounter Books. 2026. ISBN 9781641774826.

== See also ==
- List of contributors to Project 2025
