= Mary Kissel =

American executive and policy adviser

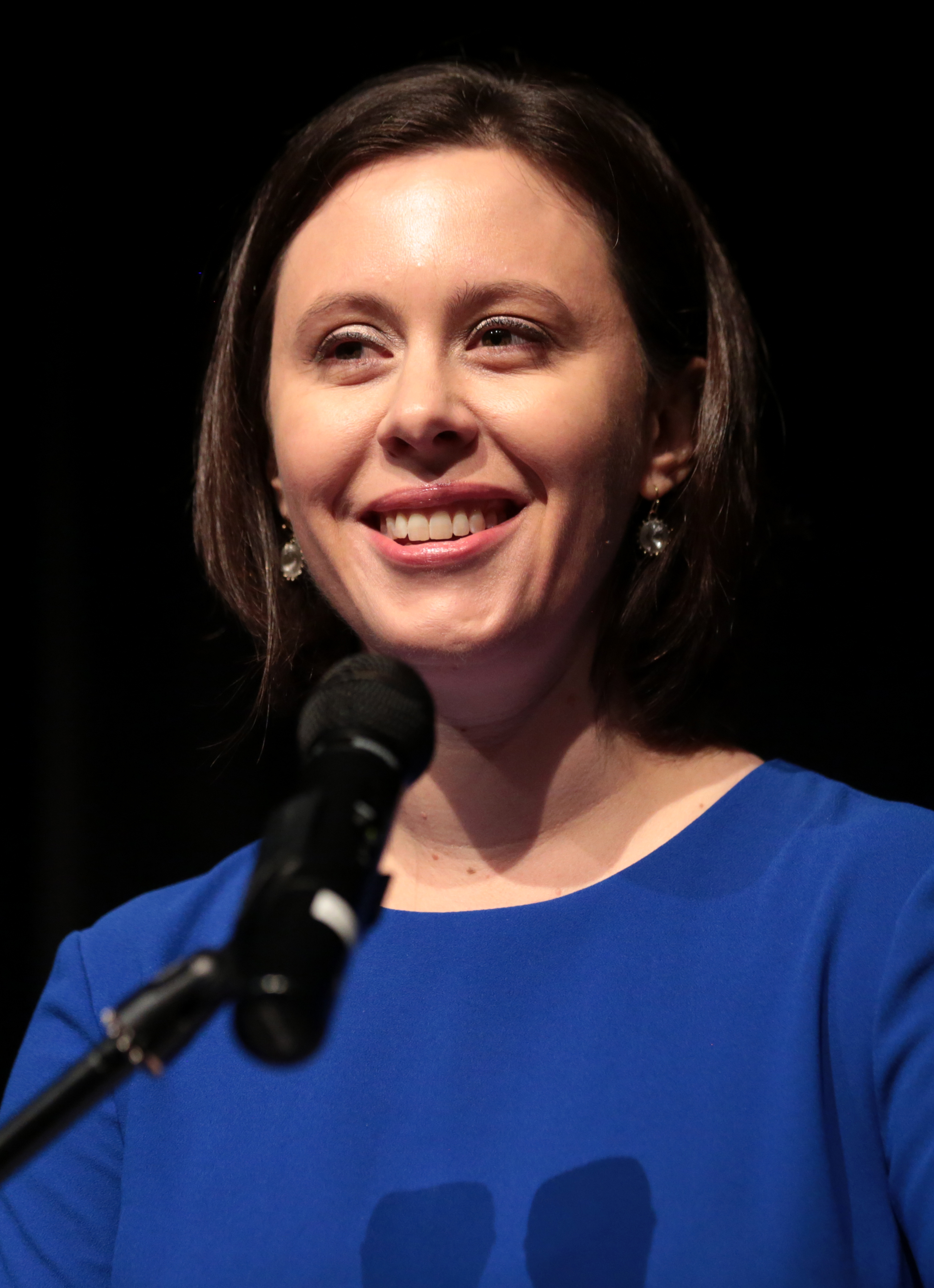
- Kissel in October 2017
- Education: Harvard University (1999); Johns Hopkins University

Mary Elizabeth Kissel is an American business executive and foreign policy adviser who previously served as a journalist. She is the founder and chief executive officer of The Kissel Group, a strategic advisory firm, and a nonresident senior fellow at the Hudson Institute. She is vice chairman of RXO, Inc., and serves on the boards of QXO, Inc., Cadre Holdings, Inc., and HEYCO Energy Group, Inc.

Kissel previously served as a senior adviser to the United States Secretary of State from 2018 to 2021 and spent 14 years at The Wall Street Journal, including as a member of its editorial board in New York and as editorial-page editor in Hong Kong. From 2021 to 2026, she was executive vice president and senior policy adviser at Stephens Inc., where she founded and led the firm's policy advisory practice.

== Early life and education ==
Kissel was born in south Florida and is a graduate of the Dreyfoos School of the Arts. She received a bachelor's degree in government from Harvard University, where she studied under Russian historian Richard Pipes. She was well known on campus as a marimba virtuosa and performed with the Harvard-Radcliffe Orchestra and Harvard College Opera. She later earned a master's degree from Johns Hopkins University's Paul H. Nitze School of Advanced International Studies, studying at the university's Bologna, Italy, and Washington, DC, campuses.

== Career ==
Kissel began her career as a financial analyst at Goldman Sachs in New York and London. She later joined The Wall Street Journal, where she spent more than a decade in editorial and commentary roles. From 2005 to 2010, she served as editorial page editor of The Wall Street Journal Asia in Hong Kong, overseeing the newspaper's opinion coverage of the Asia-Pacific region. She subsequently served on the Journal's editorial board in New York where she wrote on foreign affairs. She also hosted the Journal's Foreign Edition podcast and was a regular panelist on The Journal Editorial Report. From 2017 to 2018, she was a Fox News contributor and co-hosted The John Batchelor Show, a nationally syndicated talk show.

From October 2018 to January 2021, Kissel served as Senior Advisor to Secretary of State Mike Pompeo. In that role, she advised the Secretary and other State Department leadership on policy and strategic messaging and carried out special assignments at the Secretary's direction. Pompeo later included Kissel among a small group of trusted advisers whom he credited with helping him identify errors, challenge assumptions, and change course when necessary.

Her work included U.S. policy toward China and human rights. Kissel advocated within the administration for Uyghur rights, Hong Kong's democracy movement, and closer U.S.–Taiwan relations. During the 2019 Hong Kong protests, she served as a point of contact between senior State Department leadership and figures associated with Hong Kong's democracy movement. She also played a significant role in the reorientation of U.S.–China relations and in the State Department's work leading to the January 2021 determination that China's treatment of Uyghurs and other predominantly Muslim ethnic groups in Xinjiang constituted genocide and crimes against humanity.

During her tenure, Kissel worked on major foreign-policy initiatives, led high-priority projects across the department, and represented the United States in more than 60 countries and multilateral forums.

In March 2021, Kissel joined Stephens Inc., a privately held financial services firm, as executive vice president and senior policy adviser. Her work there focused on geopolitical risk, public policy and their implications for businesses and investors. She left Stephens in May 2026.

In 2026, Kissel founded The Kissel Group, a strategic advisory firm, where she serves as chief executive officer. The firm advises corporate leaders and investors on geopolitical developments, business risk, and strategy.

Kissel has also written for the Far Eastern Economic Review, The Spectator, Le Spectacle du Monde, and World Affairs and appeared on television networks and podcasts around the world, including ABC News, CNBC, CNN, Fox News, Fox Business, MSNBC, RTHK, and Sky News. Her radio appearances include ABC Radio, Fox News Radio, Radio National and the Larry Kudlow Show, among others.

== Affiliations ==
Kissel is founder and chief executive officer of The Kissel Group and a nonresident senior fellow at the Hudson Institute. She also serves as vice chairman of RXO, Inc. and as a director of QXO, Inc., Cadre Holdings, Inc., and HEYCO Energy Group, Inc. She is a life member of the Council on Foreign Relations, a director of the American Australian Council, and a trustee of the Center for Integrity in News Reporting. Earlier in her career, Kissel was a Claremont Institute Lincoln Fellow (2006), a Hoover Institution Edwards Media Fellow (2012 and 2016), and a member and host of the Nixon Seminar on Conservative Realism and National Security (2021–2024). Northwood University named her a Distinguished Woman in 2024 and awarded her an honorary Doctor of Laws in May 2026.
