= Society for American Civic Renewal =

Far-right Christian nationalist fraternal order in the US

- SACR trademark
- Established: 22 July 2020 (5 years ago)
- Founders: Charles Haywood
- Types: fraternity, nonprofit organization
- Legal status: 501(c) organization
- Headquarters: Indiana
- Country: United States
- Website: sacr.us

The Society for American Civic Renewal (SACR) is a far-right secretive men-only fraternal order founded by Charles Haywood in Carmel, Indiana. It aims to replace the US government with an authoritarian "aligned regime" and is noted to be rooted in extreme Christian nationalism.

== Structure ==
SACR is organized as a 501(c)(10) organization, which is a nonprofit organization "with a fraternal purpose". Charles Haywood incorporated the Society for American Civic Renewal (SACR) in September 2021. According to The Guardian, SACR is an invitation-only exclusively male group that aims for a "civilizational renaissance". The group's website describes it as "'raising accountable leaders to help build thriving communities of free citizens' who will rebuild 'the frontier-conquering spirit of America'" and promises to "counter and conquer" the "poison" of "those who rule today". SACR uses a cross-like insignia, described on the website as symbolizing "sword and shield" and rejection of "Modernist philosophies and heresies".

SACR is closely associated with the Claremont Institute.

=== Mission statement ===
According to The Guardian, SACR's internal mission statement states: "Our aim is to build and maintain a robust network of capable men who can reverse our society's decline and return us to the successful path off which America has strayed.... [SACR's founders] are un-hyphenated Americans, and we believe in a particular Christianity that is not blurred by modernist philosophies.... We are willing to act decisively to secure permanently, as much as anything is permanent, the political and social dominance [of their beliefs]."

=== Locations ===
Filings show the group has established lodges in four locations: three in Idaho (Moscow, Boise, and Coeur d'Alene) and another in Dallas, Texas.

=== Membership ===
SACR excludes from membership women, gay people, and Mormons. SACR membership is by invitation only.

== People ==
Key personnel of the SACR, besides Haywood, include Scott Yenor, a professor of political science at Boise State University in Idaho and also the senior director of state coalitions at the Claremont Institute.

The president of Claremont Institute, Ryan P. Williams, is a member of SACR's board of directors.

A key administrative role is played by Skyler Kressin, a tax consultant based in Coeur d'Alene, Idaho.

== See also ==
- Far-right politics in the United States
- Radical right (United States)
- Palingenetic ultranationalism
