= Thomas Klingenstein =

American hedge fund manager (born 1954)

- Born: Thomas Davis Klingenstein; 1954 (age 71–72)
- Education: Williams College
- Occupation: Financier
- Title: Chairman of the board of trustees, Claremont Institute
- Term: 2010-
- Spouse(s): Nancy Deborah Perlman (m. 1986; died 2018) Robin D. Weaver
- Children: 2
- Relatives: Joseph Klingenstein (grandfather)
- Website: https://tomklingenstein.com/

Thomas Davis Klingenstein (born 1954) is an American hedge fund manager, a leading donor to the US Republican Party, and chairman of the board of trustees of the Claremont Institute, a conservative think tank, since 2010.

== Early life ==
He is the son of John Klingenstein and Patricia Davis Klingenstein (1929–2023). His grandfather, Joseph Klingenstein, was an investment banker, and co-founded Wertheim & Co., an investment firm.

He was educated at Williams College.

== Career ==
Klingenstein is a partner in Cohen Klingenstein, a Wall Street hedge fund investment firm that administers a portfolio worth more than US$2.3 billion, as of 2023. Cohen Klingenstein was founded in 1981, and is principally owned by George M. Cohen and Klingenstein.

Klingenstein donated more than $10 million in the 2024 election cycle.

== Personal life ==
On 6 July 1986, Klingenstein married Nancy Deborah Perlman, daughter of Mr. and Mrs. Nathan Perlman of Tucson, Arizona, in Greenwich, Connecticut. They had two daughters together. Nancy died in 2018.

Klingenstein is now married to Robin D. Weaver, a lawyer, and they live in New York.
