= Harold W. Rood =

American political scientist (1922–2011)

Harold William "Bill" Rood (August 19, 1922 – October 6, 2011) was a political scientist and author of Kingdoms of the Blind. He was Professor Emeritus at Claremont McKenna College and taught international relations and national security affairs beginning in 1962. Rood was also a fellow at the Claremont Institute and published articles in the Claremont Review of Books. He received the Claremont Institute's Salvatori Prize in the American Founding in 2007 and taught in the Claremont Institute's Publius Fellows Program since 1979.

== Early life and education ==
Rood was an infantryman in George S. Patton's Third Army in World War II and took part in the Rhineland and Central Europe campaigns. After the war, Rood attended graduate school at the London School of Economics, Oxford University, and the University of California, Berkeley, where he received his PhD in political science. Prior to completing his graduate degree, Rood studied engineering at Stanford University.

== Kingdoms of the Blind ==
Published in 1980, Kingdoms of the Blind examines war, the Soviet crackdown in Czechoslovakia in 1968, the Cuban Missile Crisis, and other European models to explain how great democracies have resumed the follies that so nearly cost them their life.

=== Commentary on work and teaching ===
Describing the work of Professor Rood, Harry V. Jaffa said, "Professor Rood is something of a painter of the strategic scene. The combination of what at first appears to be insignificant details, the discovery of a harmonious relationship among seemingly discrete events, is accomplished by him in a manner that would have delighted Churchill the painter no less than Churchill the strategist."

Peter W. Schramm, a former student, described Rood as a "great teacher" who "didn't simply grab the truth as it revealed itself in front of him. Rather, he talked and the story came out about how men wanted to live rather than die, and what they may then do, and why that is always so."

== Published works ==
- Kingdoms of the Blind
- Distant Rampart. United States Naval Institute Proceedings 93:3 (March 1967)
