= John Batchelor =

American author and radio host (born 1948)

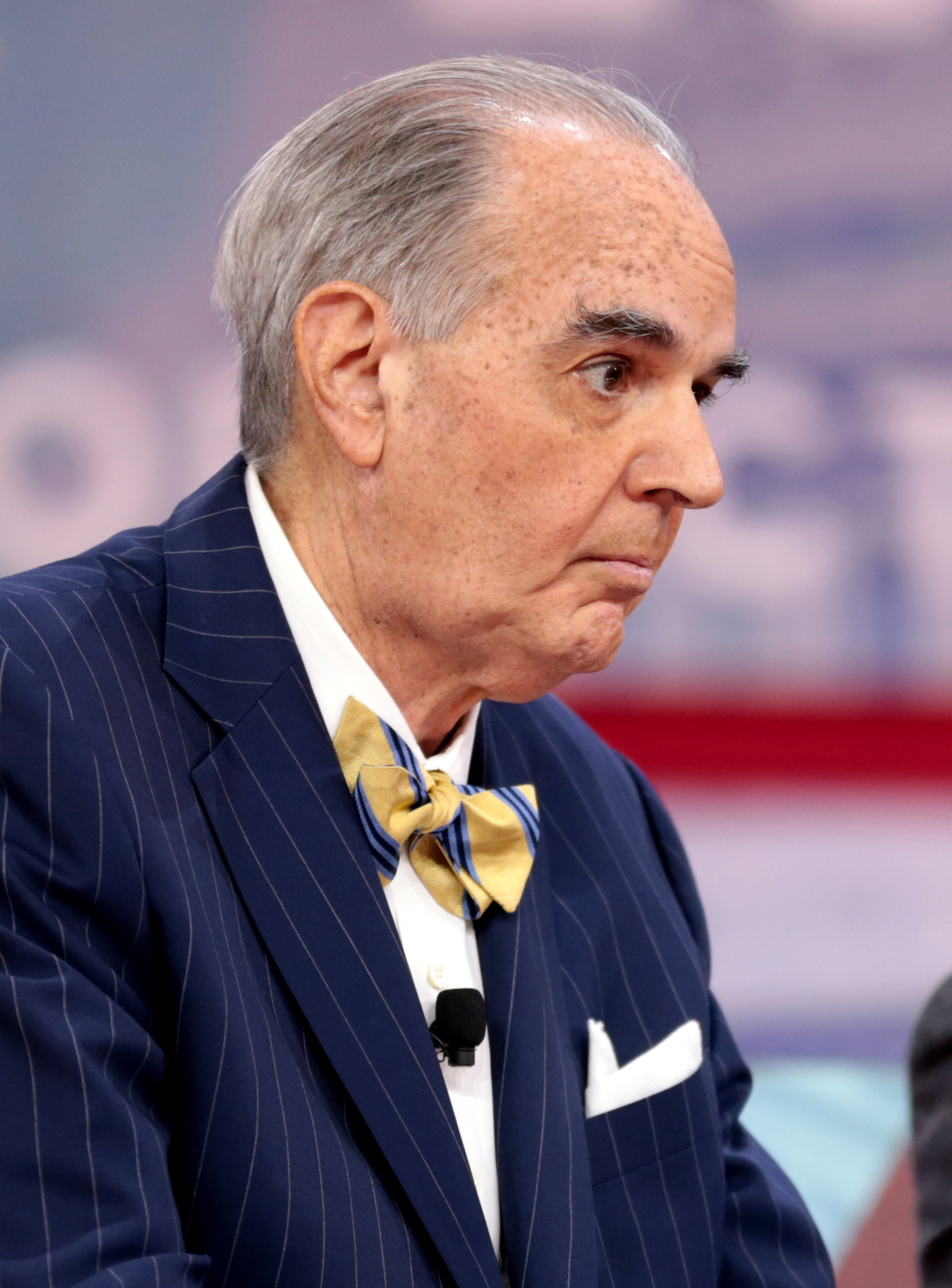
- Batchelor in February 2018
- Born: April 29, 1948 (age 78); Bryn Mawr, Pennsylvania
- Education: Princeton University (AB); University of Edinburgh; Union Theological Seminary (MDiv)
- Occupations: Author radio host
- Notable work: Batchelor and Alexander; The John Batchelor Show
- Spouse: Bonnie Rosborough

John Calvin Batchelor (born April 29, 1948) is an American author and the host of Eye on the World on the CBS Audio Network. The show is a hard-news-analysis radio program on current events, world history, global politics and natural sciences.

For five years, from early 2001 to September 2006, based at WABC radio in New York, his radio program The John Batchelor Show was syndicated nationally on the ABC Radio Network. On October 7, 2007, Batchelor returned to radio on WABC, and later to other large market stations on a weekly basis. As of November 30, 2009, Batchelor was once again hosting a nightly show on WABC, from 9 p.m. to 1 a.m. Eastern Time and heard in many major markets across the country through what eventually became the Westwood One network.

The program for a time was heard seven nights a week, using prerecorded material on weekends. Later, it aired Monday through Friday on WABC and many Westwood One network affiliates. Batchelor describes the show as a "news magazine" since he does not take phone calls from listeners but does a series of interviews with guests and reporters. The show's run on Westwood One ended in March 2021 as part of a reorganization at WABC, after which Batchelor almost immediately began his current show with CBS.

== Early life and education ==
Batchelor was born in Bryn Mawr, Pennsylvania, to an Assyrian mother from Iran and a Midwestern American father. He was raised primarily in the Lower Merion Township of Montgomery County in Pennsylvania's 13th congressional district. His mother and father both served in the United States Army during World War II; his father also served in the Korean War. Batchelor is the eldest of five brothers. He is a 1970 graduate of Princeton University. He briefly studied at the University of Edinburgh and is also a graduate of Union Theological Seminary in New York.

== Broadcasting ==
=== Batchelor and Alexander ===
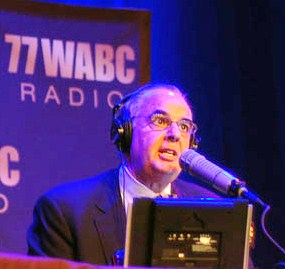
Batchelor in 2010

John Batchelor co-hosted Batchelor and Alexander with writer Paul Alexander on WABC in New York for over two years. They focused on international issues with special attention to Middle East-based terrorism. Batchelor described their approach: "Our model is the BBC World Service, with music and live interviews, but without English accents." Alexander quipped: "We're not NPR, where they do setups to things on tape. Well, we could be NPR on drugs."

Three days before the September 11 attacks, they presented a four-hour WABC show on the USS Cole bombing, interviewing several guests.

Alexander left the show in December 2003 to pursue work as a playwright and biographer.

=== The John Batchelor Show ===
The John Batchelor Show began its national syndication in April 2003. The program airs 20 hours a week on roughly 200 stations. Its focus is geopolitics, economics, war, history, hard sciences, literature, private space, whimsy, etc. Historically, it carried nightly (Mon-Fri) the "Loftus Report" featuring the intelligence commentator John Loftus on current, war-related, open-source intelligence. Aaron Klein, at the time Jerusalem bureau chief for WorldNetDaily, was also a regular and served as a co-host. Other regular contributors included Malcolm Hoenlein, the executive vice president of the Conference of Presidents of Major American Jewish Organizations; the New York attorney and taste-maker Ed Hayes; Larry Kudlow of CNBC's Kudlow & Company; Bill Whelan of the Hoover Institution; John Fund, Bret Stephens, Dan Henninger, Rob Pollock and Kim Strassel of the Wall Street Journal; Jim McTague of Barron's Magazine; Chuck Todd, then of The Hotline, now NBC Political Director; Fiona Harvey and Martin Wolf of the Financial Times; Jodi Schneider of the Congressional Quarterly; Matt Bai and A. O. Scott of the New York Times; Katrina vanden Heuvel and Stephen F. Cohen of The Nation; Victor Davis Hanson, Henry Miller, and Larry Diamond of the Hoover Institution; Adrian Wooldridge, Robert Guest, and John Parker of the Economist; Monica Crowley; David Grinspoon, resident expert on the planet Mars and outer space, and Robert Zimmerman, award-winning NASA observer. The program daily featured reports from journalists who filed with the world's most respected press outlets, and the show was reliably a few days ahead of the news cycle.

When John Batchelor occasionally took a break for several evenings, the show was often hosted by Jed Babbin, editor of Human Events in Washington, D.C.; sometimes by the former BBC journalist John Terrett, who now works for Al Jazeera; and by Larry Kudlow of CNBC's Kudlow & Company and WABC's Larry Kudlow Show. In 2012, Simon Constable of Dow Jones; Chris Riback, author and researcher, and Francis Rose of Federal News Radio in Washington, D.C., became primary fill-ins.

Batchelor's show featured multiple guests, and shows were preceded by and interspersed with news clips and music. The show focused on myriad topics, including politics, the war on terror, nuclear proliferation, the UN, African civil wars, American history, space exploration and even Hollywood scandals. The Jerusalem Post has an audio archive of Batchelor and Alexander segments from 2002 and 2003 that deal with Israel and the Middle East.

To report on breaking news, Batchelor and his executive producer have travelled domestically to hotspots, and to Azerbaijan, Qatar, Israel, Jordan, Kazakhstan, Uzbekistan, France, Poland and Taiwan. They landed in Taipei to broadcast for the week leading up to the 2004 elections when, on the last day of electioneering, both the president and the vice-president were shot and wounded by an unknown assailant.

=== First cancellation and subsequent return ===
In 2006, Batchelor announced that his ABC show would be canceled, beginning with the show scheduled for Monday, September 4.

Batchelor returned on WABC as the host of a weekly version of the previous show on October 7, 2007, from 7–10 pm Eastern Time. He then hosted a second show as a guest host on KFI in Los Angeles, filling the vacancy caused by the departure of Matt Drudge, in the next three hours from 7–10 p.m. Pacific time. His first program featured an interview with Nick Grace of ClandestineRadio.com that broke the name of al Qaeda's extranet, Obelisk, and the news that the extranet's security tightened following a press leak in September 2007.

In 2009, Batchelor expanded his show to Saturday and Sunday nights, from 9 p.m. to 1 a.m., on most of his affiliates. The Saturday show focused more on authors of history books, while the Sunday show focused on breaking news and a wider range of topics.

On November 24, 2009, WABC announced that the Batchelor show would be also airing weeknights from 9 pm to 1 am, effective November 30.

Batchelor was a frequent guest on the Gene Countryman Show, KNSS, Wichita, Kansas, Sundays at 8 pm Eastern. Batchelor on Tuesdays formerly featured an hour with Larry Kudlow on finance (until Kudlow became an advisor to President Trump), and then an hour with professor Stephen Cohen on Russia. Professor Cohen elected to take a break for a while and the Tuesday guest as of early 2020 is Gregory R. Copley, publisher of Defense and Foreign Affairs. On Wednesdays: an hour-plus with Gordon Chang on China and East Asia, and one or two segments on private exploration of space with Dr. David Livingston; on Thursdays: an hour with Mary Kissel on domestic U.S. politics, foreign policy, and matters Australian (until Kissel became a senior advisor to Secretary of State Mike Pompeo), then an hour and a half with Malcolm Hoenlein on the Middle East.

=== CBS Eye on the World ===
On March 5, 2021, Batchelor hosted his last episode of The John Batchelor Show on WABC and Westwood One, as WABC shuffled its format and the show ended its affiliation with Westwood One in favor of syndication by CBS News. Batchelor continued to produce show segments during March, styled as "The New John Batchelor Show". He noted during the segments that the show is "represented by CBS Audio Network." In April 2021, the show returned to stations across the country. The material is streamed on AudioBoom, linked from Batchelor's website; specific segments are announced on Twitter as they are available. In May 2021, Batchelor began identifying the show as CBS Eye on the World. On Monday, November 1, 2021, the program debuted on WOR in New York, airing from 9 p.m. to midnight, Monday through Friday. CBS announced the end of its news radio operations effective May 22, 2026.

== Bibliography ==
Writing as John Calvin Batchelor

- The Further Adventures of Halley's Comet (1980) (novel)
- The Birth of the People's Republic of Antarctica, Dial Press (1983) (novel)
- American Falls (1985) (novel)
- Thunder in the Dust: Classic Images of Western Movies (1987) (with John R. Hamilton)
- Peter Nevsky and the True Story of the Russian Moon Landing (1993) (novel)
- Father's Day, (1994) (novel)
- "Ain't You Glad You Joined the Republicans?": A Short History of the GOP (May 1996) (nonfiction)

Writing as Tommy "Tip" Paine

- Gordon Liddy Is My Muse (1990) (novel)
- Walking the Cat (1991) (novel)
