= Larry Greenfield =

American Republican Jewish activist and political commentator

Larry Greenfield (January 29, 1962 – January 28, 2022) was an American public intellectual, political commentator, wealth advisor, and columnist. He was a fellow at the Claremont Institute in Claremont, California and the Founding Executive Director of the Reagan Legacy Foundation. With a background in business, law, the military, politics, and policy. Greenfield lectured widely on such topics as American foreign policy, missile defense, and the Arab-Israeli conflict as well as domestic political issues. Larry Greenfield was a longtime Republican Jewish activist. On February 9, 2012, he was named National Executive Director of the Jewish Institute for National Security Affairs in Washington. In 2013, Greenfield returned to California to manage the Los Angeles office of Arete Wealth Management. Greenfield then launched a successful private practice, Greenfield Wealth Management, in Woodland Hills, California.

== Early life and education ==
Greenfield was born in Long Beach, California the son of Judge Leslie H. Greenfield and Alice (née: Lieberman). He graduated from the University of California at Berkeley (1983) in three years as Class Speaker and earned his J.D. degree from the Georgetown University Law Center in Washington, D.C. (1986).

== Career ==
Admitted to the California bar in 1987, Greenfield worked in law and business in Los Angeles, CA. He also served in the Armed Forces of the United States in Naval Intelligence Reserves. He was California Director of the Republican Jewish Coalition (2004–2008) and was a member of the executive committee of the California Republican Party.

Greenfield was a fellow of the Claremont Institute and the American Freedom Alliance. He was the Founding Executive Director of the Reagan Legacy Foundation, a non-profit educational foundation promoting the life, legacy, and leadership of former President Ronald Reagan.

Greenfield was a frequent lecturer and debater on foreign policy issues, including the Middle East conflict and the West's response to the rise of radical Islam. He also addressed such domestic issues as energy, economy, education, and mass culture. Greenfield delivered some 100 lectures annually to civic, student, conference and political groups.

Greenfield commented frequently in the media, including regular appearances on such popular radio stations as San Francisco's KSFO, San Diego's KCBQ, Palm Springs' KNWZ, and Los Angeles' KKLA. At The Claremont Institute, he produced a weekly podcast, BEDROCK with Larry Greenfield.

Greenfield was a strong critic of the left for "opposing parents and students seeking school choice and competition, the elderly seeking health care choice, and younger workers and small businesses seeking entitlement reform and personal retirement savings plans."

Greenfield was a noted advocate for capital punishment under certain circumstances. He spoke out on national television against clemency for Stanley Tookie Williams, whom he claims did not admit nor repent for his murders nor for being a founder of the Crips supergang. Governor Schwarzenegger denied the appeal for clemency. Williams was executed.

Greenfield served on the advisory board of the Endowment for Middle East Truth and on the Board of the Israel-Christian Nexus.

== Death ==
Greenfield died on January 28, 2022.
