= Vincent Phillip Muñoz =

American political scientist

- Education: Claremont McKenna College (BA); Boston College (MA); Claremont Graduate University (PhD)
- Occupation: Political scientist
- Employer: University of Notre Dame

Vincent Phillip Muñoz is an American political scientist. He is the Tocqueville Professor in the Department of Political Science and Concurrent Professor of Law at the University of Notre Dame. He is the author of two books on the principles of the American Founding focusing on religious liberty and the separation of church and state in the United States.

== Education ==
Vincent Phillip Muñoz graduated from Claremont McKenna College, where he earned a B.A. in 1993. He went on to earn an M.A. from Boston College in 1995 and a Ph.D. from Claremont Graduate University in 2001.

== Career ==
Muñoz is the Tocqueville Professor of Political Science at the University of Notre Dame. He is also the founding director of Notre Dame Center for Citizenship & Constitutional Government (formerly the Tocqueville Program for Inquiry into Religion and Public Life and the Potenziani Program in Constitutional Studies). In March 2017, Muñoz invited Charles Murray to campus despite opposition from junior faculty and students; he argued in an op-ed and speech at the Department of Justice that honoring the invitation to Murray to speak was a matter of free speech.

Muñoz authored God and the Founders: Madison, Washington, and Jefferson in 2009. The book analyzes the different positions on church and state of three Founding Fathers (James Madison, George Washington, and Thomas Jefferson) and contextualizes them in modern-day judicial conundrum like school prayers or public funding of religious institutions. It won the Hubert Morken Award from the American Political Science Association in 2011.

The book was widely reviewed. In Perspectives on Politics, Professor Isaac Kramnick of Cornell University, called it a "very important book", although he regretted Muñoz's decision to look at only three founders, concluding that other founders could illuminate modern-day jurists further. Meanwhile, in Law and History Review, Professor Mark D. McGarvie of the College of William and Mary argued that the ahistorical nature of the analysis was problematic, but that the book was nevertheless engaging. Professor Ellis M. West of the University of Richmond dismissed the book for lacking "balance and nuance", despite recognizing that Muñoz is correct to argue that "none of the Founders believed that religious liberty gave people the right to be exempt from obeying valid laws that unintentionally burden the exercise of their religion." Furthermore, in Revue française de science politique, Professor François Foret of the Université libre de Bruxelles praised Muñoz for laying out the differences between the Founders. Finally, in a review for the Journal of the Early Republic, Professor Mark Y. Hanley of Truman State University praised the book for "granting the founders their separate ways while acknowledging the continuing vitality of their political and philosophical ideas that can still offer Constitutional guidance in a new century."

Muñoz won a National Endowment for the Humanities fellowship to support his second book, Religious Liberty and the American Founding: Natural Rights and the Original Meanings of the First Amendment Religion Clauses, published by the University of Chicago Press (2022). It continues his presentation of the Founders’ philosophy and constitutionalism of religious liberty, focusing on the Founding-era state constitutions and the drafting and adoption of the First Amendment. Muñoz argues that the Founders conceived religious liberty as an inalienable natural right. The book concludes with a natural rights constitutional construction of the First Amendment’s religion clauses.

In a review in First Things, Stanford Law Professor Michael McConnell wrote, “Muñoz has written the best account in one place of the way in which the political theory of the founders regarding religious liberty connects with the delphic legal text of those clauses, which together state that ‘Congress shall make no law respecting an establishment of religion, or prohibiting the free exercise thereof.’”

According to Hoover Institution senior fellow Peter Berkowitz, “Vincent Phillip Muñoz provides a superb analysis of the natural-rights thinking that undergirded the founders’ understanding of the relation between religion and government.... His natural-rights constitutionalism yields results that at different junctures will discomfit the right and the left. But his analysis makes better sense of the Constitution’s promise of religious liberty than the major alternatives.”

Reviewing the book in Perspectives on Politics, Princeton professor Keith Whittington writes, “In Religious Liberty and the American Founding, Vincent Phillip Muñoz offers an intriguing new argument on the meaning of the religion clauses of the First Amendment of the U.S. Constitution. His unconventional argument is not likely to please anyone in the heated political and legal debates over religious liberty, but this book deserves a close reading from anyone interested in religious liberty jurisprudence, natural rights theory, or originalist approaches to constitutional interpretation.”

Muñoz has published two single-authored articles in the American Political Science Review: “James Madison’s Princeton of Religious Liberty” (2003) and “Two Concepts of Religious Liberty: The Natural Rights and Moral Autonomy Approaches to the Free Exercise of Religion” (2016). The latter article was the subject of an online symposium published by Law & Religion Forum involving a number of significant scholars.

Muñoz has edited multiple constitutional law casebooks for classroom use. Religious Liberty and the American Supreme Court: The Essential Cases and Documents is a collection of edited Supreme Court cases on religious liberty, with introduction and annotations by Muñoz. Along with Ralph Rossum and G. Alan Tarr, Muñoz has edited the two-volume American Constitutional Law (Routledge, 2020), which is designed for undergraduate classroom use.

He is a senior fellow at the Claremont Institute.

== Works ==
- Muñoz, Vincent Phillip (2009). God and the Founders: Madison, Washington, and Jefferson. Cambridge, U.K.: Cambridge University Press. ISBN 9780521515153. OCLC 699055554.
- Muñoz, Vincent Phillip (2022). Religious Liberty and the American Founding: Natural Rights and the Original Meanings of the First Amendment Religion Clauses. Chicago: University of Chicago Press. ISBN 9780226821443.
- Muñoz, Vincent Phillip, “Two Concepts of Religious Liberty: The Natural Rights and Moral Autonomy Approaches to the Free Exercise of Religion,” American Political Science Review 110, no 2 (2016)
- Muñoz, Vincent Phillip, “James Madison’s Principle of Religious Liberty,” American Political Science Review 97, no 1 (2003)
- Muñoz, Vincent Phillip, ed. (2015). Religious Liberty and the American Supreme Court: The Essential Cases and Documents. Lanham, Maryland: Rowman & Littlefield. ISBN 9781442208285. OCLC 911217552.
- Religious Liberty and the American Founding: Natural Rights and the Original Meanings of the First Amendment Religion Clauses (University of Chicago Press, 2022)
- American Constitutional Law, Volume I: The Structure of Government, 11th edition (Routledge, 2020)
- American Constitutional Law, Volume II: The Bill of Rights and Subsequent Amendments, 11th edition (Routledge, 2020)
