= Scott Yenor =

American political activist and university professor

Scott Yenor (born 1970) is an American political activist, university professor, and author, known for his anti-feminist views, a label he applies to himself. He is a member of the men-only Christian nationalist organization Society for American Civic Renewal and works for the Claremont Institute's Center for the American Way of Life.

Yenor has taught political science at Boise State University since 2000. A 2021 speech in which he described career-oriented women as "medicated, meddlesome and quarrelsome" and argued against recruiting women into professions including medicine, law and engineering drew national news coverage and campus protests. Boise State charged him with six civil rights violations in a process conducted under Title IX. Yenor is a graduate of the University of Wisconsin–Eau Claire and Loyola University Chicago.

In January 2025, Governor Ron DeSantis appointed Yenor to the board of trustees of the University of West Florida in Pensacola, Florida, where he was elected board chair. The appointment drew protests in Pensacola and criticism from members of the Florida Legislature, and Yenor resigned on April 9, 2025, before a confirmation vote in the Florida Senate.

== Early life and education ==
Scott Yenor was born in 1970. He attended the University of Wisconsin–Eau Claire, receiving a B.A. in 1993. He earned a Ph.D. from Loyola University Chicago in political science and government in 2000.

== Academic career ==
Yenor was hired as a professor at Boise State University in 2000. He is a tenured professor and teaches political philosophy.

In his academic writings, Yenor has addressed the Scottish Enlightenment, David Hume, the Reconstruction era, presidential power, and "the principles of family regime for the late modern world".

== Political activism ==
Yenor is a member of the Society for American Civic Renewal, a secretive, men-only Christian nationalist organization. He drafted documents in 2021 related to the organization's charter and purpose. He is also a fellow with the Center for the American Way of Life of the Claremont Institute. In 2023, Claremont hired Yenor as its first senior director of state coalitions. Yenor is a senior research fellow at the Heritage Foundation.

Yenor drew earlier attention in 2017 for an article in The Daily Signal titled "Transgender Activists Are Seeking to Undermine Parental Rights", after which a petition calling for his dismissal gathered more than 2,000 signatures.

=== 2021 National Conservatism Conference speech ===
On October 31, 2021, Yenor delivered a speech titled "The Family Form that Nations Need" at the National Conservatism Conference in Orlando, Florida, addressing what he called the "political and personal evils that flow from feminism". He said that "our independent women seek their purpose in life in mid-level bureaucratic jobs like human resource management, environmental protection and marketing", and that such women were "more medicated, meddlesome and quarrelsome than women need to be". He said that "every effort must be made not to recruit women into engineering, but rather to recruit and demand more of men who become engineers", adding "ditto for med school, and the law, and every trade". He also said: "If every Nobel Prize winner is a man, that's not a failure. It's kind of a cause for celebration". Yenor argued that the country should "de-emphasize" its colleges and universities, describing them as "indoctrination camps" and as "the citadels of our gynecocracy".

The speech attracted little attention until late November 2021, when excerpts posted to TikTok circulated widely. A university spokesman said that the open exchange of ideas could introduce "uncomfortable and even offensive ideas" but that Boise State could not restrict protected speech. President Marlene Tromp and dozens of administrators and faculty subsequently signed a statement affirming the university's support for women and their right to pursue any course of study. Yenor stood by the speech, saying that feminists' conception of empowerment was career-based and premised on women's independence from family life.

In December 2021, Boise State's Faculty Senate issued a statement condemning Yenor's remarks and saying that his words did not represent the Senate's perspectives, while also affirming the importance of academic freedom and freedom of speech.

Hundreds of people demonstrated at Boise State in December 2021. A Change.org petition asking the university to review Yenor's lectures, public statements and grading under Title IX gathered close to 8,000 signatures; Provost John Buckwalter recommended that Tromp disregard it. Emails obtained by Idaho Education News through a public records request showed that former Idaho House Speaker Bruce Newcomb, who had previously worked as the university's legislative lobbyist, suggested that Boise State consider a "termination strategy", and that at least one alumnus asked to be removed from university fundraising lists over the remarks.

Seven days after the speech, Boise State charged Yenor with six civil rights violations, among them an allegation that he had graded female students lower than male students on the basis of sex. Writing in Law & Liberty in June 2022, Yenor said the charges were "spurious", said they had been resolved in his favor. Boise State declined to comment on the proceeding or on whether it had investigated his grading practices, citing personnel-record exemptions in response to a public records request.

In 2024, the Southwest Idaho chapter of the National Organization for Women organized a protest outside a Boise State event, hosted by the campus chapter of Turning Point USA, at which Yenor spoke on what he termed "compulsory feminism". Chapter president Cindy Thorngren said the group disagreed with the position that feminism was harmful to society.

Yenor has stated his belief that the Civil Rights Act of 1964 as an obstacle to society, as it mandates equal treatment of men and women, which he is against.

Yenor published a paper with the Heritage Foundation in July 2026 arguing for sports to be exempted from Title IX and for competitive women's sports to be replaced with "cheerleading, dance, yoga, hiking clubs, recreational intramurals, and other athletic opportunities more aligned with average female interests and tendencies."

=== Idaho higher education ===
Yenor has criticized social justice programs at Idaho universities, including his own Boise State. He has written white papers against the programs in conjunction with the Idaho Freedom Foundation, a conservative think tank. In 2021 he was selected by Idaho's then-Lieutenant Governor Janice McGeachin to serve on a task force aimed at finding evidence of indoctrination in primary, secondary, and higher education. While on sabbatical in January 2023, Yenor was invited by a conservative group to speak at Eagle High School. An article in the Idaho Statesman described how dozens of students jeered at him and walked out during his speech.

Yenor anonymously founded the far-right website Action Idaho in 2021. The platform published commentary critical of Idaho Republicans deemed insufficiently right-wing and hateful disinformation related to LGBTQ+ groups. Yenor received funding for the endeavor from Claremont Institute chairman Thomas Klingenstein. His authorship of the website was uncovered in 2024.

== University of West Florida board of trustees ==
In January 2025, Governor Ron DeSantis appointed Yenor to the University of West Florida board of trustees. At the board's January 23 meeting, the newly appointed trustees elected Yenor chair over incumbent trustee Richard Baker, who was supported by the existing members. The appointment was opposed by students, local residents and county commissioners, and former trustee Jeanne Godwin founded a group, Save UWF, to campaign against it. DeSantis defended the appointment in February 2025, saying that Yenor would "be a champion for the classical mission of a university".

Also in February 2025, posts by Yenor on X were criticized by members of the Florida Legislature's Jewish Caucus; Republican state senator Randy Fine described Yenor as a "bigot" and a "misogynist". Yenor resigned on April 9, 2025, before a confirmation vote in the Florida Senate, writing to university president Martha Saunders that "opposition to my nomination among a group within Florida's Senate" had led to his departure and that he would continue to work on higher education reform. Republican state senator Don Gaetz said that his office had received thousands of messages about the appointment and that none had expressed support for Yenor. Three other DeSantis appointees to the board were questioned by the Senate Appropriations Committee on Higher Education the following day about their votes to elect Yenor chair.

== Personal life ==
Yenor is married to Amy Yenor, an events coordinator, and has five children. He lives in Meridian, Idaho, and is Lutheran.
