= Jeremy Carl =

American political commentator

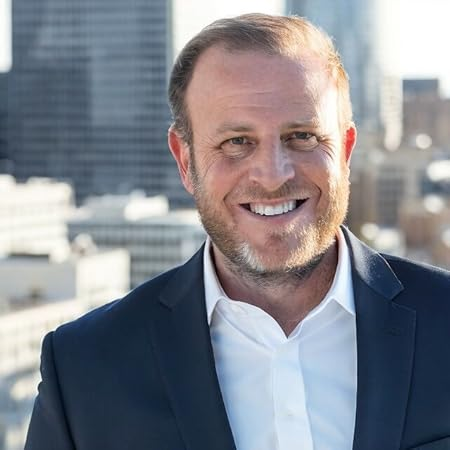
Jeremy Carl, c. 2024

Jeremy Carl is an American right-wing political commentator and government official who was Deputy Assistant Secretary of the Interior during the first Trump Administration. Carl is a senior fellow at the Claremont Institute. He was previously a research fellow at the Hoover Institution.

== Early life and education ==
Carl received a BA from Yale University, where he served as President of the Yale Political Union, and an MPA from the Kennedy School of Government at Harvard University. He was a research fellow at Stanford University's Freeman-Spogli Institute for International Studies. From 2004 to 2005 Carl lived in India where he was a visiting fellow in resource and development economics at The Energy and Resources Institute in New Delhi.

Carl comes from a Jewish family but has converted to Christianity. He is a member of the Presbyterian Church in America.

== Career ==
Carl is a Senior Fellow at the Claremont Institute. He was previously a research fellow at the Hoover Institution. Carl's book The Unprotected Class: How Anti-White Racism Is Tearing America Apart received praise from a broad swath of conservative figures and influencers including Victor Davis Hanson, Tucker Carlson, Charlie Kirk, Peter Kirsanow, Heather MacDonald, Steve Bannon, Dinesh D’Souza, and Christopher Rufo.

Carl stirred controversy in 2020 and again in 2025 over incendiary social media posts. He expressed sympathy for the January 6th rioters, describing them as "political prisoners" and saying they had it worse than Black Americans in the Jim Crow South. He called for the death penalty for American Federation of Teachers President Randi Weingarten. In 2021, he complained about the "total absence" of White Protestants in the Biden administration. He criticized the addition of Juneteenth as a federal holiday, saying, "If you’re a white person celebrating Juneteenth, you’ve already surrendered". Senator Chris Murphy of Connecticut called Carl a white nationalist shortly after questioning Carl during a congressional hearing on his nomination to be the Assistant Secretary of State for International Organization Affairs. Carl pushed back against the assertion that he is a white nationalist and instead claimed that he is an American civic nationalist.

Carl has advocated for the Trump administration to ignore court rulings it considers illegal.

=== Donald Trump administration ===
Carl was Deputy Assistant Secretary of the Interior during the first Trump Administration.

In June 2025, President Donald Trump nominated Carl to be the Assistant Secretary of State for International Organization Affairs. In September 2025, CNN reported that Carl had deleted thousands of inflammatory social media posts and requested their removal from the Wayback Machine. The posts included praise for the January 6 rioters, a call for the death penalty for an opponent, promotion of the Great Replacement conspiracy theory and denigration of George Floyd. Carl withdrew his nomination on March 10, 2026, citing a lack of support among Republican Senators on the Senate Foreign Relations Committee.

== Books ==
- Conversations about Energy: How the Experts See America's Energy Choices (Hoover Institution Press, 2010) (with James Goodby)
- Distributed Power in the United States: Prospects and Policies (Hoover Institution Press, 2013) (editor)
- Keeping the Lights on at America’s Nuclear Power Plants (Hoover Institution Press, 2017) (with David Fedor)
- The Unprotected Class: How Anti-White Racism Is Tearing America Apart (Regnery, 2024)
