= Wertheim & Co. =

American financial firm

- Type: Acquired
- Industry: Financial services
- Founded: 1927; 99 years ago
- Founders: Maurice Wertheim and Joseph Klingenstein
- Fate: Acquired by Schroders (fifty percent in 1986 and the remaining fifty percent in 1994)
- Successor: Wertheim Schroder (1986–1994); Schroder Wertheim (1994–2000); Salomon Smith Barney (later Citigroup)
- Headquarters: New York, New York, U.S.
- Products: Investment banking, brokerage
- Number of employees: 1,000 (1986)

Wertheim & Co. was an investment firm founded in 1927 by Maurice Wertheim and Joseph Klingenstein, who met when they worked together at Hallgarten & Company.

The firm engaged primarily in the merchant-banking business; it invested (in companies and real estate primarily for the benefit of its own partners and a small number of investment-advisory clients) from its formation until the deaths of Wertheim and one of his senior partners (Edwin Hilson) in 1950 and 1952, respectively.

After 1950, control of the firm passed to co-founder Joseph Klingenstein. He was a brilliant investor in stocks, and under his leadership the firm created one of the first professional research departments on Wall Street. In the mid-1950s, the firm became more active in underwriting, and subsequently attained major-bracket status in both equity and debt securities.

Although its size and visibility did not keep pace with those of fellow major-bracket firms such as Goldman Sachs, Morgan Stanley and Lehman Brothers, the firm expanded significantly in the early 1970s. Under the leadership of Klingenstein's son Fred, Wertheim & Co. expanded its services (research, sales, and trading) to institutional investors and increased its asset management business. As of 1970, the twenty partners and approximately 200 employees generated annual revenues of around $40 million (not including gains recorded in the personal accounts of partners and clients).

By 1986, when the Klingenstein family sold its fifty percent interest in the firm to Schroders, a British merchant bank, Wertheim had 38 managing directors, 51 associate managing directors, a total staff of almost 1,000, annual revenues over $200 million, five offices in the U.S. and three in Europe. The name of the firm was changed to Wertheim Schroder in 1986 after Schroder's initial investment, and to Schroder Wertheim in 1994 after Schroder acquired the remaining fifty percent interest in the firm. In 2000, Schroders sold its global investment-banking operations (including Schroder Wertheim) to Salomon Smith Barney, a subsidiary of Citigroup.

== History ==
=== 1886–1929 ===
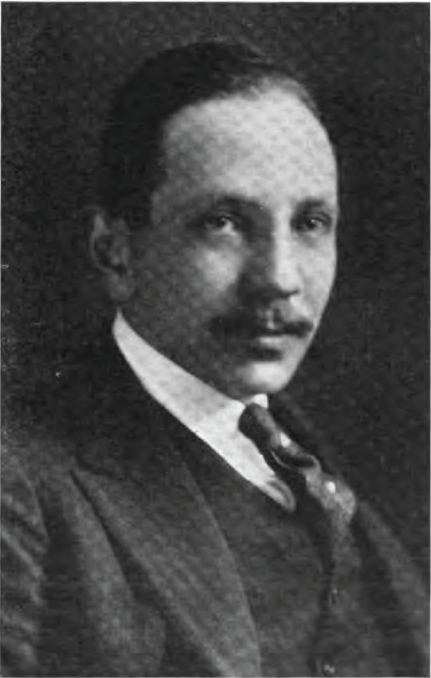
Maurice Wertheim about 1922

Maurice Wertheim was born on February 16, 1886, to Jacob Wertheim and his wife, Hannah A. Morgenthau Wertheim. Jacob Wertheim was a founder of Wertheim & Schiffer (later Kerbs, Wertheim & Schiffer), one of several domestic cigar-manufacturing companies which were combined in 1902 to form the United Cigar Manufacturers Company, of which he became president. Jacob was also at one time director of the General Motors Corporation, a director of the Underwood Typewriter Company, and a director of several large real-estate concerns. He was also a founder of the Federation for the Support of Jewish Philanthropic Societies.

In 1891, Joseph Klingenstein was born into an immigrant family who operated a dry-goods store on the Lower East Side of Manhattan.

In 1908, Maurice went to work for his father's company (United Cigar Manufacturers Company) after graduating from Harvard University with a B.A. degree in 1906 and an M.A. degree in 1907. In 1909, he married Alma Morgenthau—daughter of Henry Morgenthau Sr., a prominent banker, diplomat (Woodrow Wilson’s Ambassador to Turkey) and philanthropist. Alma's brother, Henry Morgenthau Jr., would become Secretary of the Treasury under President Franklin D. Roosevelt in 1934. Three daughters were born from this marriage, one of whom, Barbara W. Tuchman, became a Pulitzer Prize–winning historian (Tuchman authored The Guns of August and A Distant Mirror). The Wertheims lived at 176 East 75th Street and in Cos Cob, Connecticut, at an estate known as Wyndygoul.

In 1911, Klingenstein joined Hallgarten & Co. after receiving a B.A. degree from Columbia University and completing one year of Columbia Law School. Neil Finch graduated from West Point, and became a colonel during World War I. Four years later, Maurice joined Hallgarten & Co., becoming a partner in 1919. The following year, Klingenstein left Hallgarten to join Arthur E. Frank. Jacob Wertheim died on November 21, 1920, leaving an estate appraised in December 1921 at $7.3 million gross and $6.0 million net (including $2.1 million in Liberty bonds, $860,377 in Underwood Typewriter common stock, $738,675 in Sears Roebuck common stock, and $560,000 in real estate). The following year, Neil Finch joined Bankers Trust. In 1924, Klingenstein purchased a membership on the New York Stock Exchange (NYSE) and became a floor broker.

In 1927, Maurice formed Wertheim & Co. (W&Co.) with Klingenstein, Finch and Henry Hottinger with offices at 57 William Street. Hottinger had been Jacob Wertheim's secretary; in 1935, he began what would become the Henry Hottinger Collection of rare violins. In its first deal (announced the week it opened), W&Co. acquired a controlling interest in the Underwood Typewriter Company, merging it with the Elliot-Fisher Company to form one of the largest office-equipment companies of its day. In its early days, W&Co. established one of the first investment-research departments on Wall Street, originally to help the firm's partners invest their own capital. As late as 1971, its well-known reports were produced on onion-skin paper with a gold staple in the corner. In 1928, Herb Goldstone joined the company. The following October, the stock market crashed after a period of rampant speculation; W&Co., out of the market before the crash, was not hurt.

=== 1929–1945 ===
During the Depression, W&Co. bought Nedick's (a New York restaurant chain famous for its hot dogs) for $46,000; after paying $3 million in dividends over the years, it sold the restaurant chain for $4.5 million in 1951.

Its investment-banking clients included Continental Baking, Bristol Myers, Spiegel and Underwood Typewriter.

W&Co. partners liked to take long winter vacations in Cuba, which was then a playground for Americans seeking a break from the constraints of the later Prohibition era. Cuba was also the headquarters of some of the biggest sugar companies in the world. Before long, W&Co. had an interest in a number of sugar growers and refiners; Maurice bought a home in Cuba, and visited there regularly.

Through partnerships (first with Arnold Kirkeby, and later with Jesse Sharp and Spencer-Taylor), W&Co. made many investments in real estate—particularly hotels and office buildings, the market for which was severely depressed because of the Depression. Control of these properties was obtained by buying defaulted mortgage bonds selling for a fraction of their face value. Among the firm's many investments were: 120 Broadway (Equitable Building); One Fifth Avenue; the Madison Hotel; Hampshire House; Brooklyn Towers; The Warwick; the Saranac Inn; the Hotel Nacional de Cuba in Havana; the Blackstone Hotel in Chicago; the Beverly Hills Hotel in Los Angeles; the Ritz Tower and Delmonico's.

At this time, Finch left the company, to be replaced by Richard Bernhard. Bernhard, married to Dorothy Lehman, provided close contact with other major investment-banking firms in New York. Maurice divorced his first wife in 1929; he married Ruth White Warfield, whom he divorced in 1935, marrying Cecile Berlage. The couple moved to a penthouse at 33 East 70th Street.

In 1930, Walter Laband, a German-educated banker, joined W&Co. with responsibility for foreign offices acquired from Colbin & Co. in London and Amsterdam. The company's primary activity was arbitrage in foreign securities.

Two years later, the failure of Hilson & Neuberger brought Edwin Hilson, Milton Steinbach (Klingenstein's brother-in-law) and George Jones to W&Co. Hilson was a self-made man, whose formal education reportedly ended when he was expelled from Exeter at age 16 for adolescent high jinks. He sold cigars to western Pennsylvania coal miners (like Maurice, Hilson's father was in the cigar-manufacturing business), was drafted into the army during World War I, and returned to Wall Street. A friend from Exeter introduced him to Harry Neuberger, who put up the money to start Hilson & Neuberger. Another friend of Hilson from P.S. 6 in New York was Sidney Weinberg, who became head of Goldman Sachs. Steinbach was a product of Andover and Yale; Jones was Hilson's assistant.

During that year, the Dow Jones Industrial Average (DJIA) bottomed at 41, down eighty-nine percent from the 1929 high of 381. NYSE volume declined to 425 million shares, from 1.1 billion in 1929 and 810 million in 1930. The value of a seat on the NYSE fell to $68,000, from $550,000 in 1929. The U.S. unemployment rate in 1933 reached twenty-five percent.

In 1933, Roosevelt proclaimed a bank holiday and embargoed gold; Congress passed the Securities Act of 1933 (the "truth in securities law"). W&Co. moved its funds into Treasury bills before the bank holiday. The following year, Alfred Kleinbaum joined W&Co.; the Securities and Exchange Commission (SEC) was established by Congress under the Securities Exchange Act of 1934.

In 1935, Maurice purchased The Nation (the oldest liberal weekly magazine in the U.S.) when it was on the brink of bankruptcy; his daughter Barbara began to write for the magazine. Two years later, he sold the magazine to its editor.

The same year, Maurice purchased from the Chubb family (of Chubb Insurance) the lease for private fishing on the entire Sainte-Anne River on the Gaspé Peninsula in Quebec. On the river, he built a lodge at the Serenity Pool. In 1969, all leases for private fishing on the Sainte-Anne River were ceded by Cecile Wertheim to the Government of Quebec. In 1936, Maurice began his collection of late 19th- and early-20th-century Impressionist paintings and sculpture (after his death, the collection was given to Harvard University and is housed at Harvard's Fogg Museum in Cambridge). Most of his acquisitions were made during World War II.

As the 1940s began, Steinbach was the firm's investment banker, Klingenstein the stock picker and trader, Hottinger the administrator, Hilson the deal man, Bernhard the contact with other Wall Street firms, and Maurice was increasingly involved in public affairs and personal interests. Banking clients included Continental Baking and Helena Rubenstein; the firm's foreign offices were closed because of World War II. Cuban operations provided shelter from the excess-profits tax during the war years.

In 1941, Maurice was named president of the American Jewish Committee; the following year, he moved to Washington, D.C., as a member of the War Production Board.

=== 1945–2000 ===
In 1946, Maurice led the American chess team as its non-playing captain against the Soviet team in Moscow, in a match played over the radio. Laband retired, making a personal gift of one week's salary to every employee of the firm. Bob Bach joined the firm, after graduating from Princeton and serving in the U.S. Navy. The following year, Maurice donated 1,800 acres (7.3 km^{2}) in Suffolk County to the U.S. Fish and Wildlife Service as a wildlife refuge (the Wertheim National Wildlife Refuge). He and his wife Cecile had previously managed the area as a private waterfowl conservation and hunting reserve. In 1948, Maurice published a book entitled Salmon on the Dry Fly.

In 1949, W&Co. had nine partners: Maurice, Klingenstein, Hilson, Steinbach, Jones, Goldstone, Bach, Hottinger and Allen DuBois (who headed the underwriting department). Wilbur Cowett joined the company, working closely with Hilson. Maurice died in 1950, at age 64. His obituary noted that he was a trustee of the American Wildlife Foundation, a noted fisherman, a tournament chess player, founder and director of the New York Theatre Guild, an equestrian, and director of the Underwood Corporation, the Cuban Atlantic Sugar Company, the Hat Corporation of America, and the Bond Stores Company. He was also a trustee of Mount Sinai Hospital and the Federation of Jewish Philanthropies.

Entering the 1950s, W&Co. was one of the leading U.S. firms in trading foreign securities. Investment-banking clients included Armour and Company, Food Fair, Spiegel, Shoe Corporation and Miles Shoe. Bill Kerr joined the company from Bacon Whipple; he had excellent contacts in the industry as president of the Investment Bankers Association of America (forerunner of the Securities Industry Association) in 1958–1959. The company was active in trading telephone bonds in joint accounts with Goldman Sachs and others; most of the real-estate holdings were liquidated. John Hilson (son of Eddie) joined the company.

In 1952, Eddie Hilson died at the age of 57. He had become involved in politics through his wife, Mildred, who remained active after his death and became a close friend of the Eisenhowers. President Eisenhower painted a portrait of her, and her 90th birthday party in 1988 was attended by Richard Nixon (who played "Happy Birthday" on the piano for her) and Henry Kissinger. In 1953, Alan Cohn joined the company. The following year, 120 Broadway was sold to William Zeckendorf. Also in 1954, Fred Klingenstein (Joseph's son) joined the company; he eventually led a shift in the firm's emphasis from merchant banking to investment banking, asset management and institutional brokerage. John Klingenstein (Fred's brother) joined W&Co. in 1959, the year Fidel Castro took power in Cuba and confiscated U.S. investments (W&Co.’s investments in Cuba were liquidated long before).

During the 1960s, W&Co. (assisted by Kerr) became one of about 20 major-bracket underwriters; this was also due to close relationships between Steinbach and Gus Levy at Goldman Sachs, and Cowett and Ralph DeNunzio at Kidder Peabody. Investment- banking clients included Dreyfus, Armour, and Ward Drug. Bob Bach spearheaded efforts to expand institutional brokerage operations. In 1962, the company moved its offices from 120 Broadway to the recently constructed 1 Chase Manhattan Plaza and opened a Paris office in 1964. As an historical footnote, in 1965, the DJIA approached 1000 with a high for the year of 969; it would not cross that threshold until 1972, and would remain around that level until 1983. The 1967 acquisition of Martin E. Segal Co. added to growth in investment-management operations, and in 1969, W&Co. successfully defended its client, Armour, from a hostile-takeover bid by Greyhound.

Steinbach died in 1970, age 67. His obituary noted that he was a trustee of Mt. Sinai Hospital since 1956, a leader in the establishment of the affiliated School of Medicine of the City University of New York, president of the school's trustees from its organization in 1963 until his death, governor of the NYSE from 1964 to 1969, assistant treasurer of the Federation of Jewish Philanthropies, charter trustee of Andover and a member of the executive committee of Yale's development board and its Commission on Alumni Affairs. In 1972, most operations of the firm were incorporated; Fred Klingenstein became chairman and CEO of W&Co., Inc., which opened a Philadelphia office. The following year, LEWCO Securities Corp. formed as a partnership between Lehman Bros. and Wertheim & Co. to consolidate back-office operations. Also in 1974, Robert Shapiro joined W&Co. from Lehman Brothers; he led a buildup in the corporate-bond department and initiated the firm's entry into risk arbitrage, U.S. government securities, and OTC trading. Joseph Klingenstein died in 1976 at age 85. His obituary noted that he was a long-term benefactor of Mt. Sinai Hospital (of which he was a trustee since 1941 and a former president and vice-president), chairman emeritus of the board of the Mt. Sinai Medical Center, governor of the NYSE from 1938 to 1944 and from 1947 to 1953, board member of the Federation of Jewish Philanthropies and a trustee of Temple Emanu-El. He was a noted stock-market trader and investor, with a strong value orientation and one of the original contrarians. In 1977, W&Co. moved its offices from 1 Chase Manhattan Plaza to the Pan Am Building; the following year it acquired the Philadelphia office of White Weld & Co., and opened a San Francisco office in 1979.

A London office opened in 1982, and Martin E. Segal bought his firm back from W&Co. In 1983, a Boston office opened; the DJIA finally broke out decisively above 1000, climbing to a peak of 2722 in 1987. The company acquired a Geneva office from A.G. Becker in 1984. That same year, Lehman Bros. was acquired by Shearson and withdrew from LEWCO; Moseley and Hambrecht & Quist (H&Q) joined LEWCO. Managed by Frederick Klingenstein and Pierre Philippe, (head of the famed asset management firm Pan Holding), Wertheim also formed a strategic joint-venture called "Wertheim Philippe International". A September 1985 article by Dan Rottenberg in Town & Country magazine, entitled "The Explosive New World of Wall Street" (in a section sub-headed "Merchant Bankers" that also provides profiles of Allen & Company, Brown Brothers Harriman & Co., Dillon, Read & Co., and Lazard Freres & Co.), describes Wertheim & Co. as follows:

Founded 1927. An old-fashioned, one-office family firm known for making big profits by quietly investing its own partners' money. In the best tradition of merchant banking, it has a long history of buying into private companies, then taking them public. It was one of the first firms to have a research department (in the 1920s), but often prides itself on its anachronistic ways: as late as 1971, the firm's external research reports were mailed out on onion-skin paper with a gold staple in the corner. Founder Maurice Wertheim (1886–1950) started out in the cigar business, became an investment banker in 1915 and launched his own firm twelve years later. He was also publisher of The Nation, a noted art collector, a fisherman (he gave the government 1,800 acres in Suffolk County as a wildlife refuge) and tournament chess player; his daughter is historian Barbara W. Tuchman (The Guns of August, A Distant Mirror). Maurice Wertheim ceased to be active in the firm after about ten years and the controlling interest passed to co-founder Joseph Klingenstein, a renowned stock picker and philanthropist. He was active in Mount Sinai Hospital, which he visited every morning before work, even on Saturdays. His son Frederick Klingenstein, a Harvard Business School graduate, heads the company today. (Fred's brother John, formerly a civil engineer, is also with the firm.) Robert Shapiro, hired by Fred Klingenstein from Lehman Brothers to run the firm, is chairman of the board of the Securities Industry Association this year. The firm is growing more entrepreneurial and less cautious lately.

In 1986, Schroders, plc (a British merchant bank) purchased a fifty percent interest in W&Co.; the firm's name changed to Wertheim Schroder & Co. (WS&Co.). Two years later, WS&Co. moved its offices from the Pan Am Building to the Equitable Tower and the firm became a primary dealer in U.S. government securities. Moseley went out of business, leaving WS&Co. and H&Q as co-owners of LEWCO. Fred Klingenstein left WS&Co. to form Klingenstein Fields & Co., an investment management firm. In 1989, WS&Co. sold minority interests to three institutions: Mitsubishi Trust and Banking Corp., Bank of Boston, and Massachusetts Mutual Life Insurance Company; a Los Angeles office opened under the leadership of Robert Fisher. The following year, the company acquired Amsterdam and Houston offices from Drexel Burnham.

In 1994, Schroders acquired the other fifty percent of WS&Co.; six years later it sold its global investment banking operations, including WS&Co. (whose name had been changed to Schroder Wertheim & Co. and then to Schroder & Co.) to Salomon Smith Barney, a subsidiary of Citigroup. The LEWCO subsidiary of Schroder & Co. was sold to BNY Clearing Services ten months later.

== 1970s advertisements ==
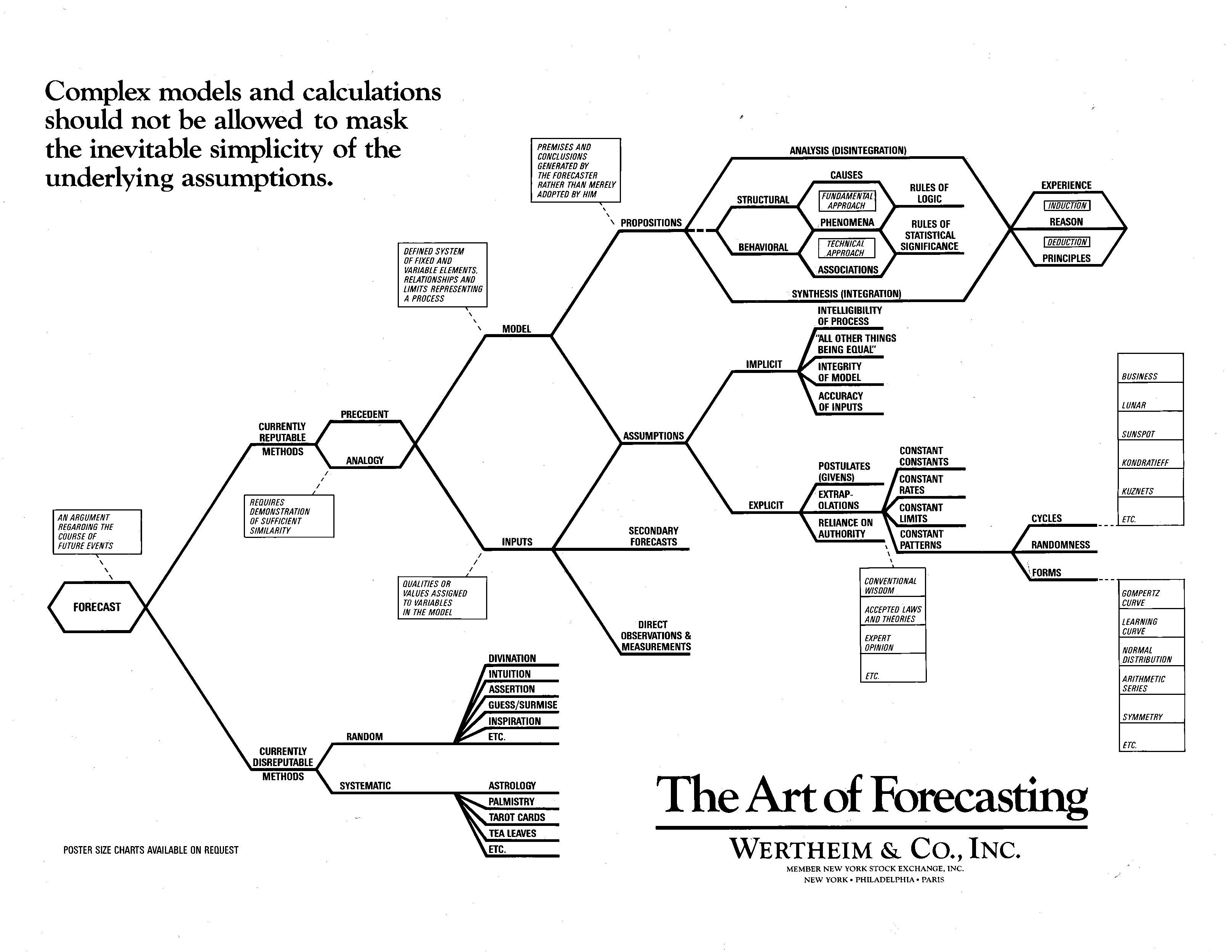

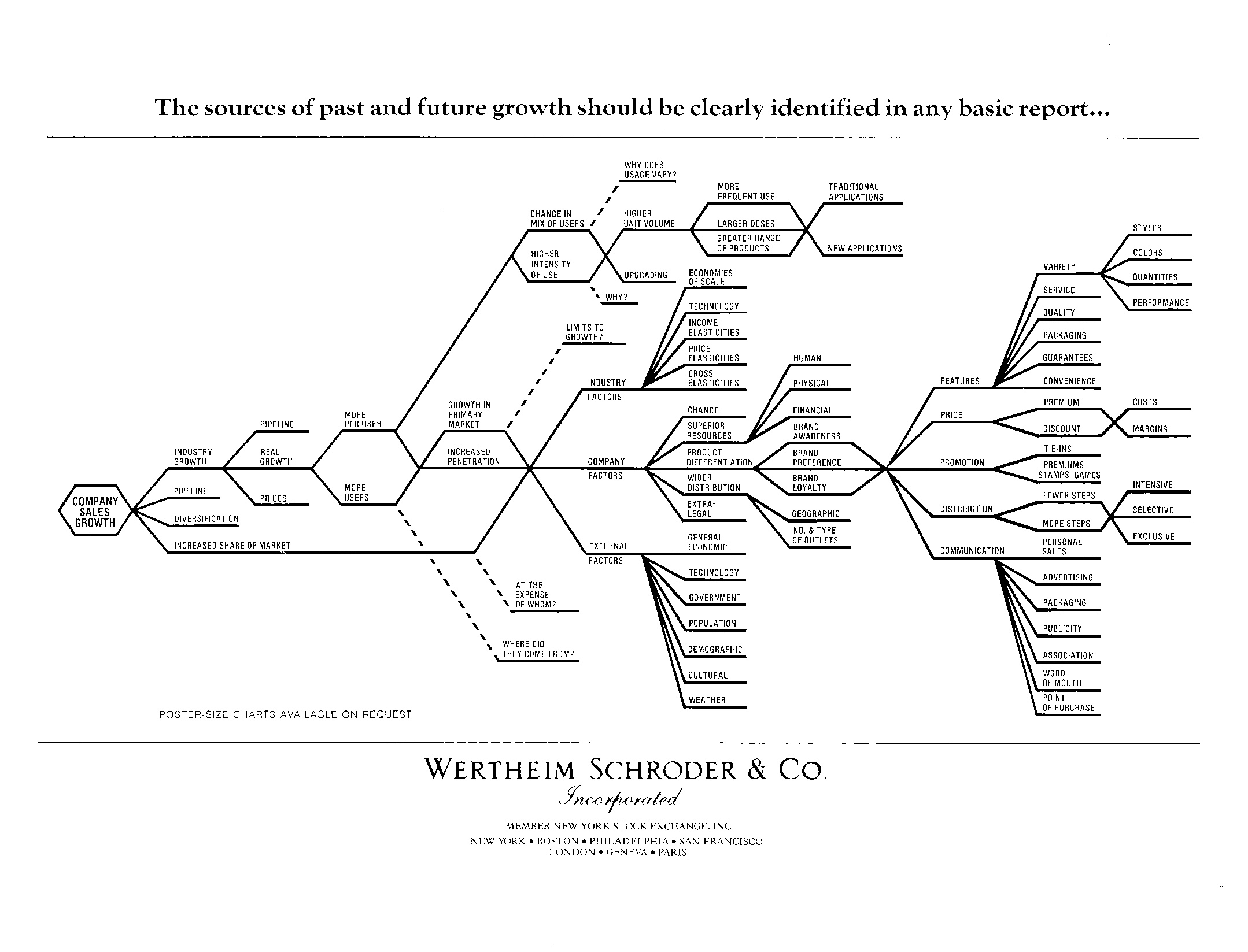

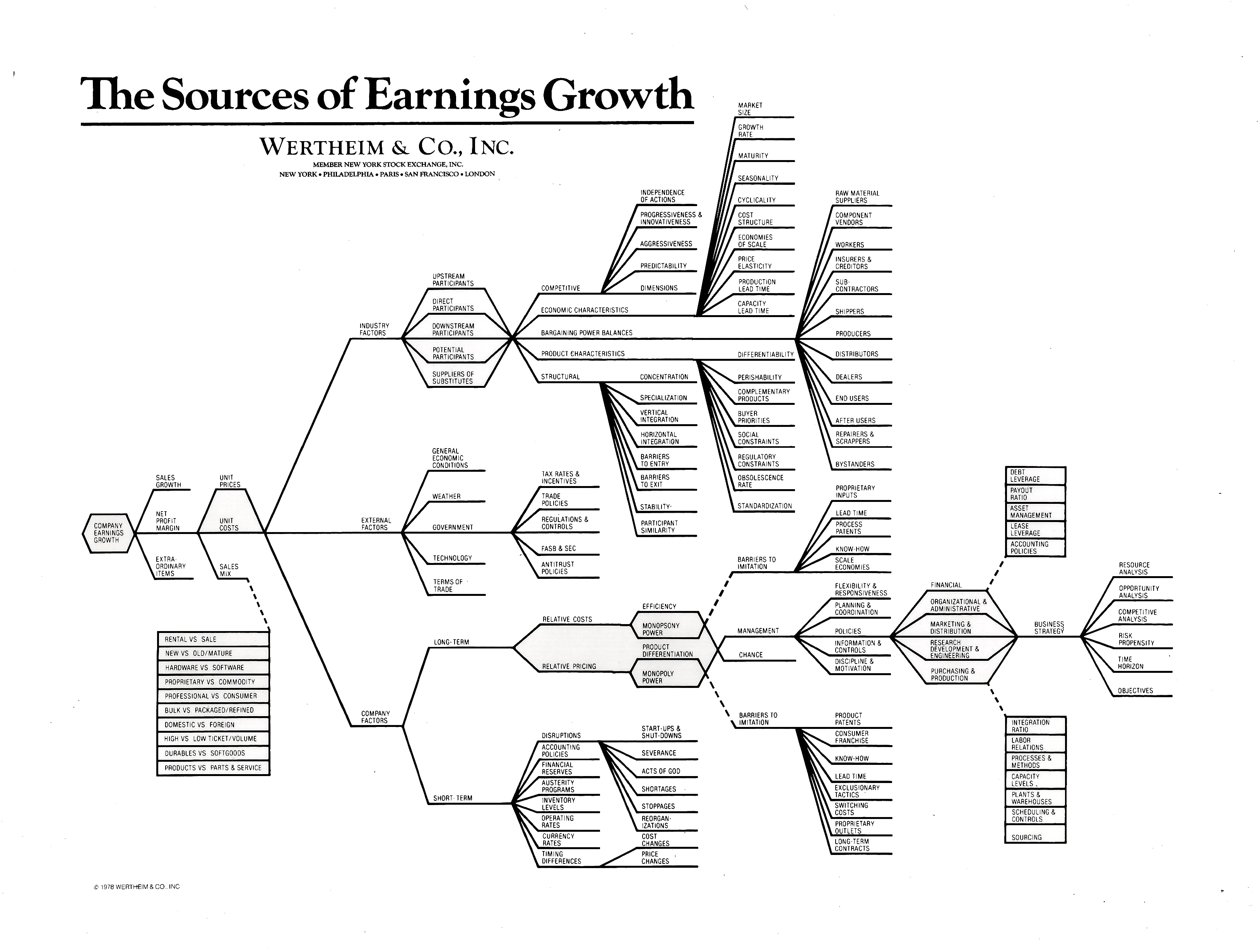
