= Glenn Ellmers =

American political commentator

Glenn Ellmers is an American political commentator. He is a former speech writer for the Secretary of Energy. He is the former Director of Research at the Claremont Institute.

Ellmers has a BA in International Relations from Boston University, an MA in Political Philosophy and PhD in political science from Claremont Graduate University.

== Books ==
- The Narrow Passage: Plato, Foucault, and the Possibility of Political Philosophy (Encounter Books, 2023)
- The Soul of Politics: Harry V. Jaffa and the Fight for America (Encounter Books, 2021)

=== Editor ===
- with Michael Anton Leisure with Dignity: Essays in Celebration of Charles R. Kesler
