= Joseph Klingenstein =

American investment banker (1891–1976)

Joseph Klingenstein (1891–1976) was an American investment banker, and the co-founder in 1927 (with Maurice Wertheim) of Wertheim & Co., an investment bank.

== Biography ==
Klingenstein was honorary chairman of Wertheim & Co. which he co-founded in 1927. He was a long-term benefactor and president of Mount Sinai Hospital.

He was married to Esther Adler, who died in 1974.

They created the Esther A. and Joseph Klingenstein Fund (EAJK Fund) in 1945.

== See also ==
- List of philanthropists
- List of people from New York City
- List of people from New York (state)#Business
