= American Moment =

Nonprofit organization founded in Washington, D.C., in 2021

- Formation: February 4, 2021; 5 years ago
- Founder: Saurabh Sharma, Nick Solheim, and Jake Mercier
- Type: 501(c)(3) public charity
- Tax ID no.: 85-1875789
- Purpose: Conservative leadership development
- Headquarters: Washington, D.C.
- CEO: Nick Solheim
- Chief Strategy Officer: Jake Mercier
- Director of Operations: Haviva Rubenfeld
- Board of directors: JD Vance, Terry Schilling, Josh Hammer, Ryan Girdusky, Saagar Enjeti, and Rachel Bovard
- Website: americanmoment.org

American Moment is a nonprofit organization founded in Washington, D.C., in 2021. The organization focuses on recruiting and training junior-level political staff. Its programs include a variety of educational and candidate vetting resources.

The organization describes its ideological orientation as aligned with economic nationalism, restrictions on immigration, skepticism toward neoconservative foreign policy, and cultural conservatism, positions that its founders have distinguished from those of older center-right institutions such as the American Enterprise Institute and the Cato Institute. Vice President JD Vance was among its early backers.

== History ==
American Moment was founded on February 24, 2021, with a launch event held at the Conservative Partnership Institute's (CPI) headquarters in Washington, D.C. The organization grew out of a November 2020 essay titled "We Will Not Go Back," which served as its founding manifesto. American Moment was co-founded by Saurabh Sharma, Nick Solheim, and Jake Mercier. They shared the view that the conservative movement lacked an organization focused on building a junior-level staffing pipeline aligned with the political priorities of the Trump administration.

At the time of American Moment was founded, Sharma was the former Chairman of Young Conservatives of Texas. Solheim was the founder of The Wallace Institute for Arctic Security. Mercier was an independent writer and editor.

At the launch event, attendees included Representatives Jim Banks, Ken Buck, and Marjorie Taylor Greene, as well as former White House Chief of Staff Mark Meadows, who served as a senior partner at CPI. Founding advisory board members Ryan Girdusky, Rachel Bovard, and Saagar Enjeti also attended. Former U.S. Senator and Attorney General Jeff Sessions recorded a video message for the event in which he described an "America First movement that Donald Trump led."

American Moment formally incorporated in 2020; its fiscal year ending December 2020 recorded $179,005 in total revenue.

JD Vance, at the time a venture capitalist based in Ohio, joined the organization's board of advisors as a founding member in May 2020.

== Mission ==
American Moment describes its mission as working "to identify, educate, and credential young Americans who will implement public policy that supports strong families, a sovereign nation, and prosperity for all."

The organization positions itself as an alternative to what it characterizes as the legacy conservative establishment, which it refers to as "Conservatism Inc." According to the group, this establishment bears responsibility for what the organization describes as porous borders, prolonged foreign military engagements, deference to corporate interests, erosion of religious life, restrictions on free expression, and the economic decline of working Americans.

== Policy priorities ==
American Moment's stated policy priorities include immigration restriction, pro-family economic policies, law and order, and manufacturing-oriented trade policy.

== Programs ==
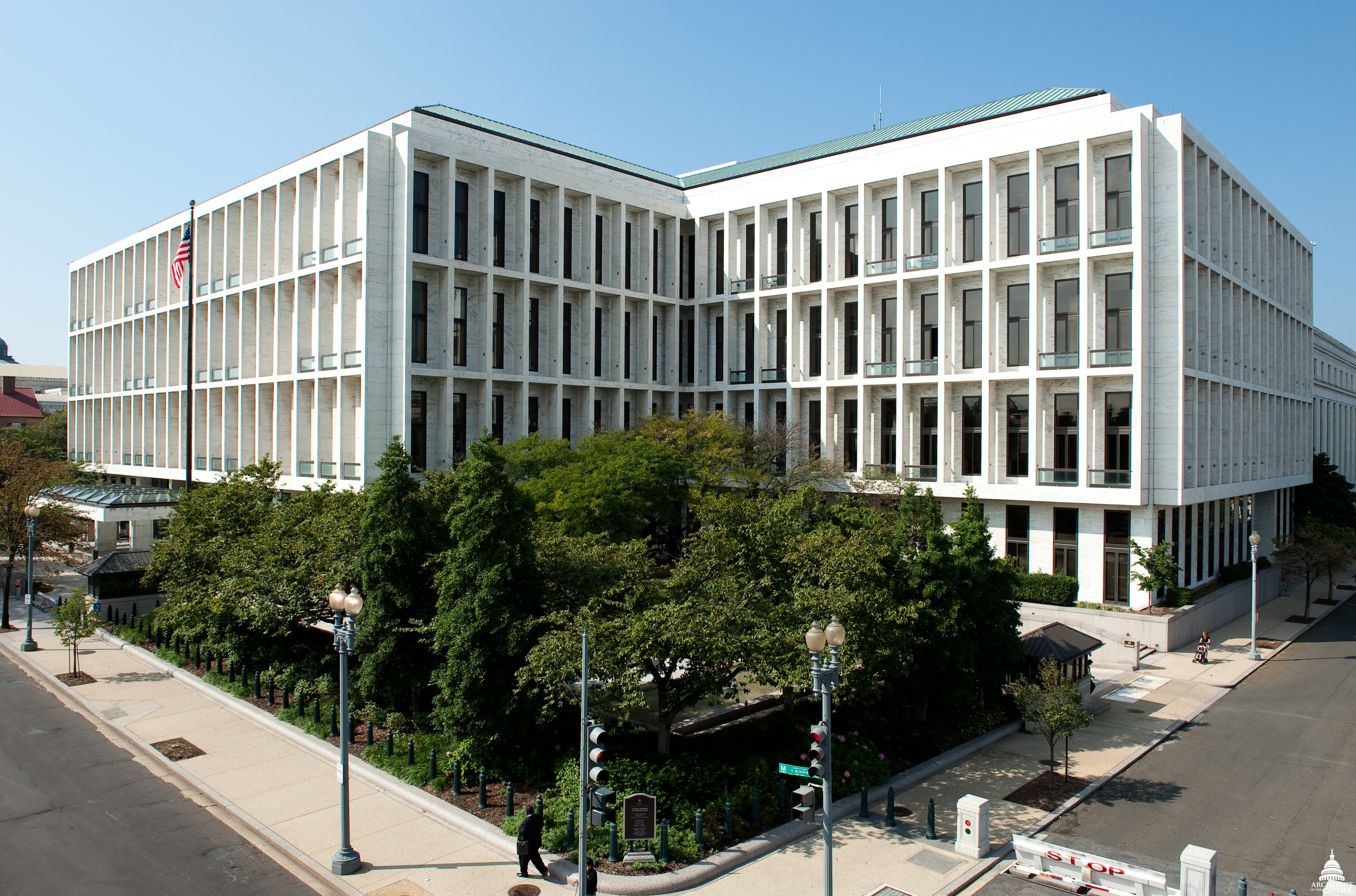
The Hart Senate Office Building. America Moment runs programs for staffers inside U.S. capitol office buildings.

American Moment's core programs are structured to recruit, train, and place conservatives in government and policy roles at successive career stages. The Fellowship for American Statecraft is a twelve-week, paid fellowship for early-career conservatives. Fellows intern four days per week in congressional offices, executive branch agencies, or policy organizations. The fellowship's curriculum covers trade, immigration, national security, technology, and industrial policy, alongside instruction in the practical workings of the federal government.

The Foundations of American Statecraft is a twelve-week lecture and seminar program for interns and junior staff already employed in Washington, who retain their existing positions in congressional offices, think tanks, or similar organizations while participating. The program meets on Fridays at American Moment's offices and runs three cohorts per year, each completing a sequence of sixty lectures. Instructors have included alumni of the Trump administration, chiefs of staff, researchers, and movement leaders. American Moment describes the program as intended to develop what it calls "Washington's next generation of consequential staffers."

AMFridays is a free weekly seminar series open to Capitol Hill staffers, interns, and junior staff working in public policy in Washington, D.C. The series features presentations on Fridays by policy experts on topics relevant to government and public service. Sessions have been held in locations including rooms within United States Senate office buildings.

== Organization and finances ==
American Moment is organized as a 501(c)(3) nonprofit public charity. The organization derives nearly all of its revenue from contributions and grants, with program-service income accounting for less than two percent of total revenue.

According to IRS Form 990 filings summarized by ProPublica's Nonprofit Explorer, American Moment's revenue grew substantially in its early years of operation. The organization reported contributions of $179,005 in 2020, its pre-launch year, rising to $733,222 in 2021, $1,093,796 in 2022, and $1,325,434 in 2023. Contributions represented at least 98 percent of total revenue in each year. Program-service income remained minimal throughout the period, peaking at $17,815 in 2022.

== Leadership ==
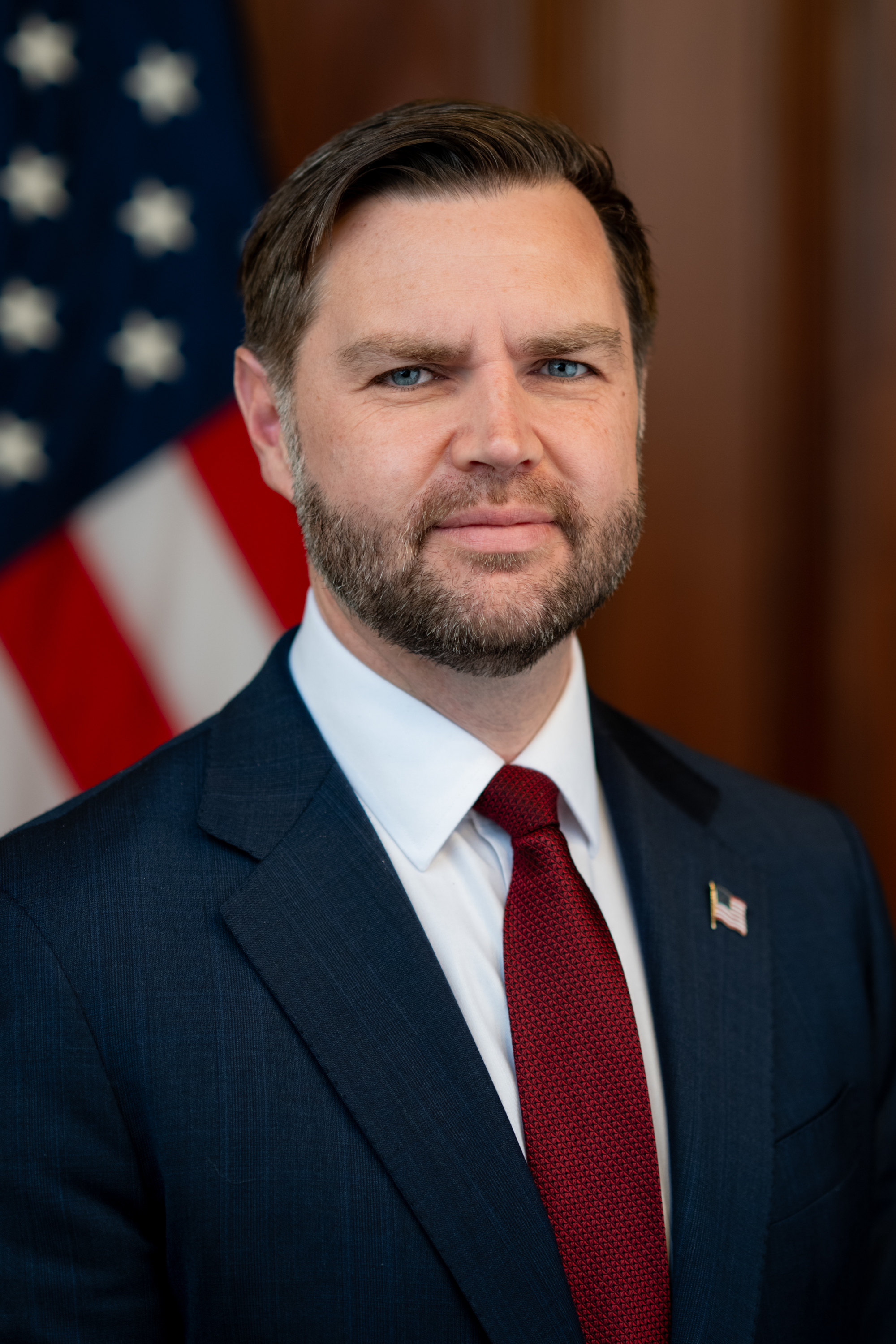
Vice President JD Vance sits on American Moment's board of advisors

American Moment's board of advisors includes JD Vance, Terry Schilling, Josh Hammer, Ryan Girdusky, Saagar Enjeti, and Rachel Bovard.

== Clash with National Review ==
Shortly after American Moment's launch on February 24, 2021, co-founders Saurabh Sharma and Andrew Solheim published an op-ed in The American Conservative outlining the organization's mission. An editor at National Review responded with a critical piece that disputed several aspects of the organization, including its programming of fellowships, events, and podcasts, which the National Review editor compared to "Prestige Worldwide," a fictional company from the 2008 comedy film Step Brothers. The editor also questioned the founders' emphasis on the concept of the "common good."

Sharma and Solheim replied with an op-ed in The American Mind, characterizing the criticism as reflecting what they described as an "old order's circular firing squad." The National Review editor published a follow-up piece arguing that American Moment appeared more focused on attacking critics than on diagnosing problems within the conservative movement.
